= Hierapolis Archaeological Museum =

Coordinates: 37.925°N 29.124°E

- Pamukkale Arkeoloji Müzesi
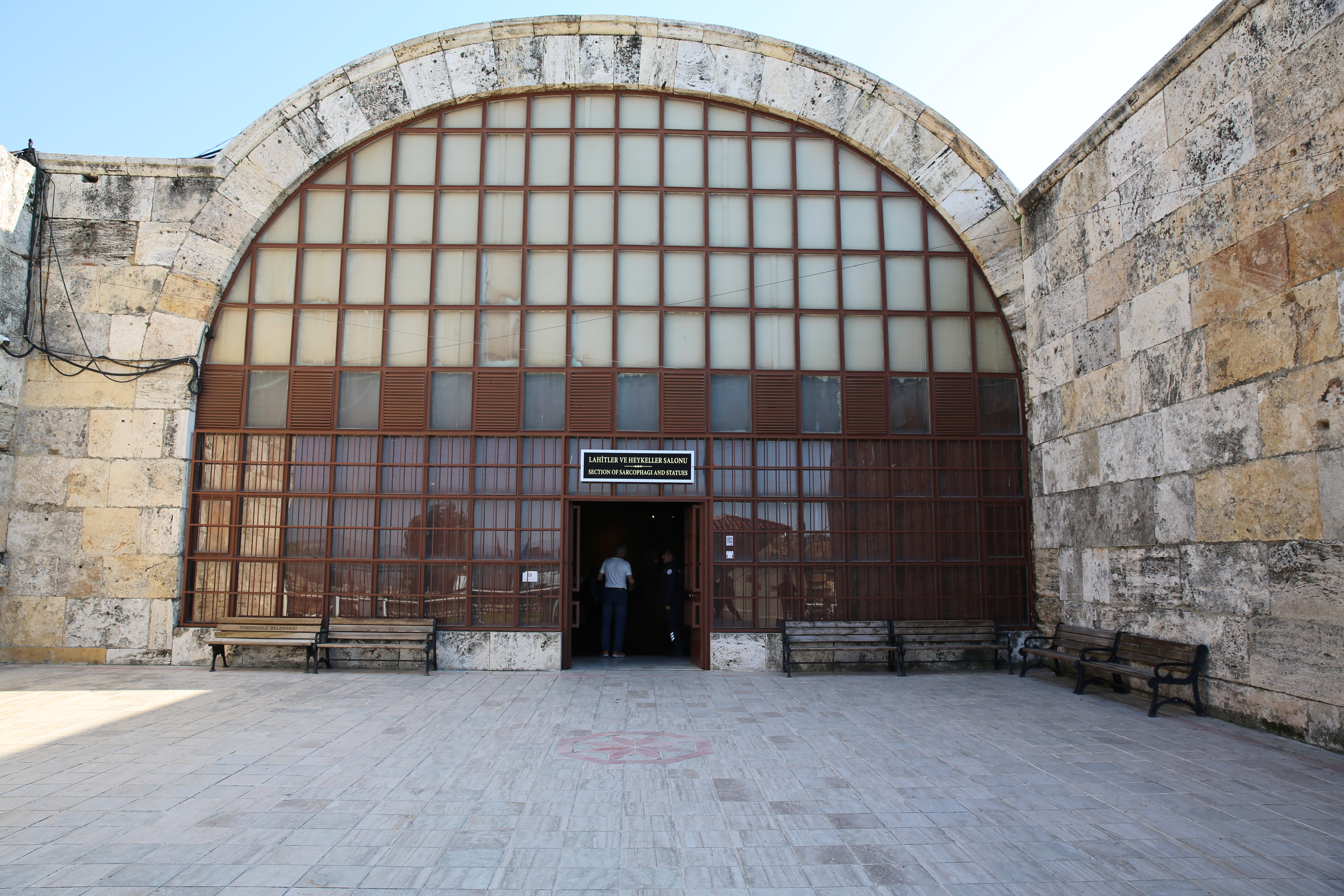
- Entrance to the museum
- Established: 1 February 1984; 42 years ago
- Location: Pamukkale, Denizli, Turkey
- Type: Archaeological museum

The Hierapolis Archaeological Museum or Pamukkale Archaeological Museum (Turkish: Hierapolis Arkeoloji Müzesi) is an archaeological museum located in the ancient city of Hierapolis within the borders of Pamukkale in Denizli Province, Turkey. It was established by restoring the historical Roman Bath building, one of the structures of the ancient city, and has been used as a museum since 1 February 1984. The museum exhibits artifacts excavated from Hierapolis, as well as finds from cities in the Lycus (Çürüksu) valley such as Laodicea, Colossae, Tripolis, and Attuda, and from the Beycesultan mound.

== History ==
In the 1950s, following archaeological excavations initiated by an Italian team in the ancient city of Hierapolis, it was planned to establish a museum to protect and exhibit the unearthed artifacts. The Roman Bath, located within the ancient city, was transformed into a museum as a result of restoration work that began in the 1970s. After the arrangement works were completed, the museum was officially opened on 1 February 1984.

== Museum building ==
The museum is housed in the historical Roman Bath (South Bath) structure, which covers an area of 14,000 square meters in the southwestern part of the city, opening to the travertine channels. The construction of the bath began during the reign of Roman Emperor Hadrian (117–138 AD) and was completed under Septimius Severus. Three enclosed spaces, which are parts of the Hierapolis Bath, along with the open areas known as the library and gymnasium adjacent to the east, currently serve as the exhibition areas of the museum.

== Collections and exhibitions ==
The museum's exhibition area consists of three main indoor halls and an open-air exhibition area. The artifacts exhibited in the open area are mostly marble and stone architectural fragments.

=== Statues and Sarcophagi Hall ===
This hall contains sarcophagi, statues, tombstones, architectural columns, and inscriptions, mostly obtained from the Hierapolis and Laodicea excavations. Among the exhibited works are reliefs depicting gladiator fights and bull-leaping scenes.

=== Small Finds Hall ===
Small artifacts belonging to various civilizations dating back to the 4th millennium BC are exhibited in this hall in a chronological order. Terracotta vessels, idols, and stone artifacts unearthed during excavations carried out by the British Institute of Archaeology between 1954 and 1959 at the Beycesultan Mound near the Çivril district, as well as terracotta oil lamps and glass artifacts from the Phrygian, Hellenistic, Roman, and Byzantine periods, are displayed in this section.

=== Theater Finds Hall ===
Reliefs, statues, and architectural pieces excavated from the stage building of the Hierapolis Ancient Theater and subsequently restored are exhibited in this hall.

== Notable artifacts ==
The museum collection includes works featuring mythological figures:

- Relief of Marsyas: Scene reliefs depicting the punishment (flaying) of Marsyas, who entered a musical contest with the god Apollo and lost.
- Statue of a Priestess of Isis: A marble statue of a priestess dating back to approximately 200 AD.

== Gallery ==
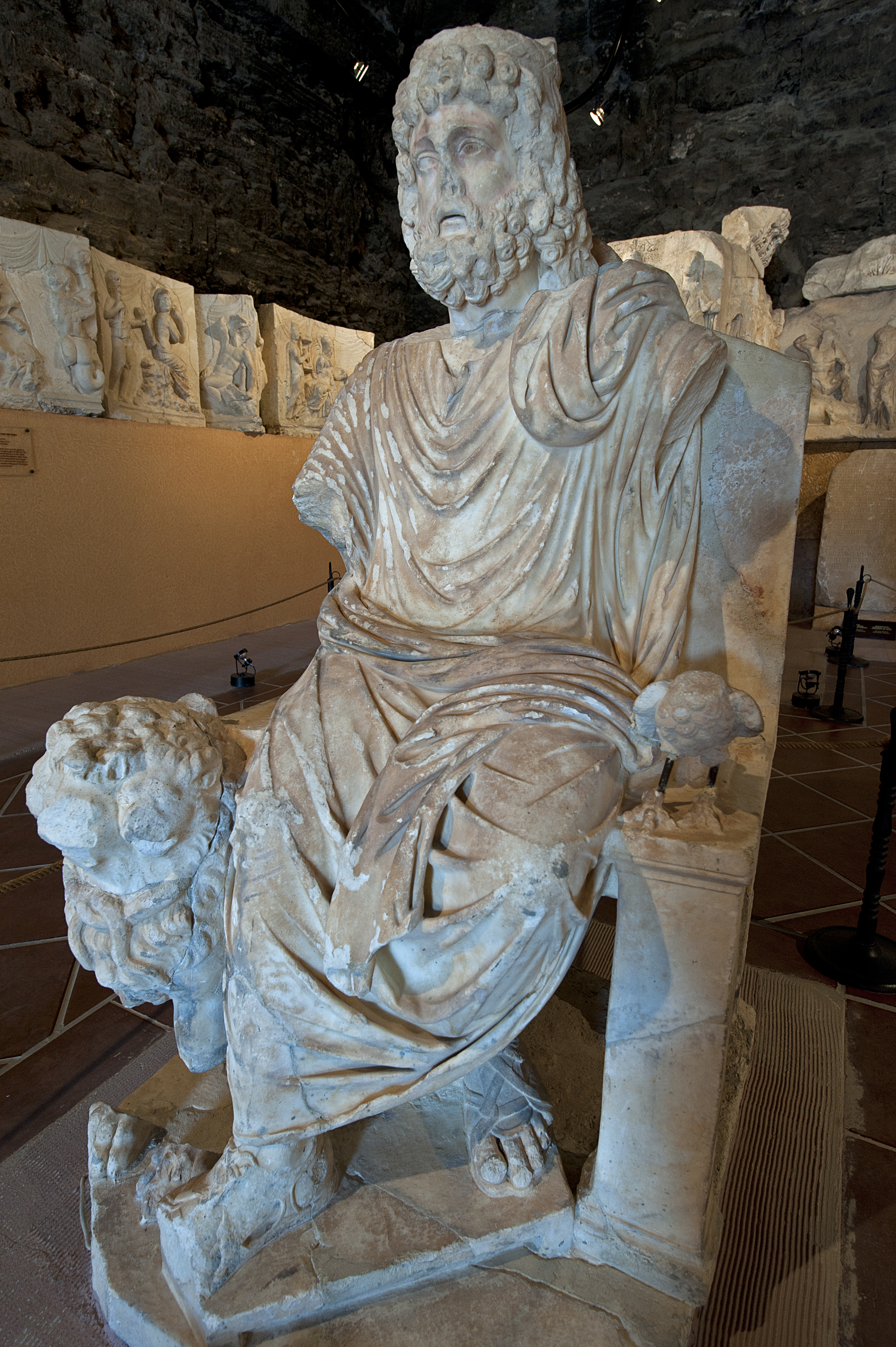
Statue of Hades

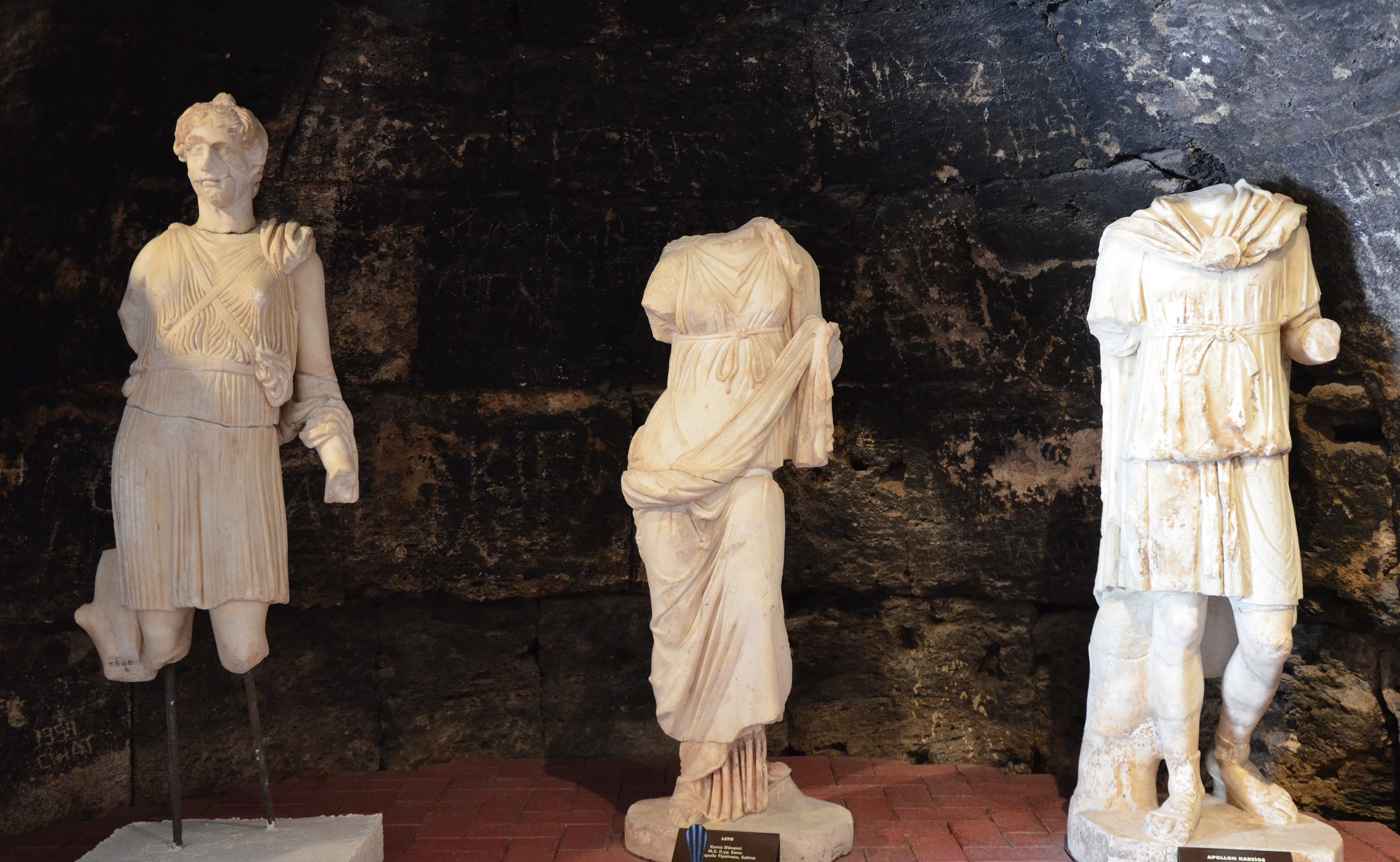
Statues of Artemis, Leto, and Apollo

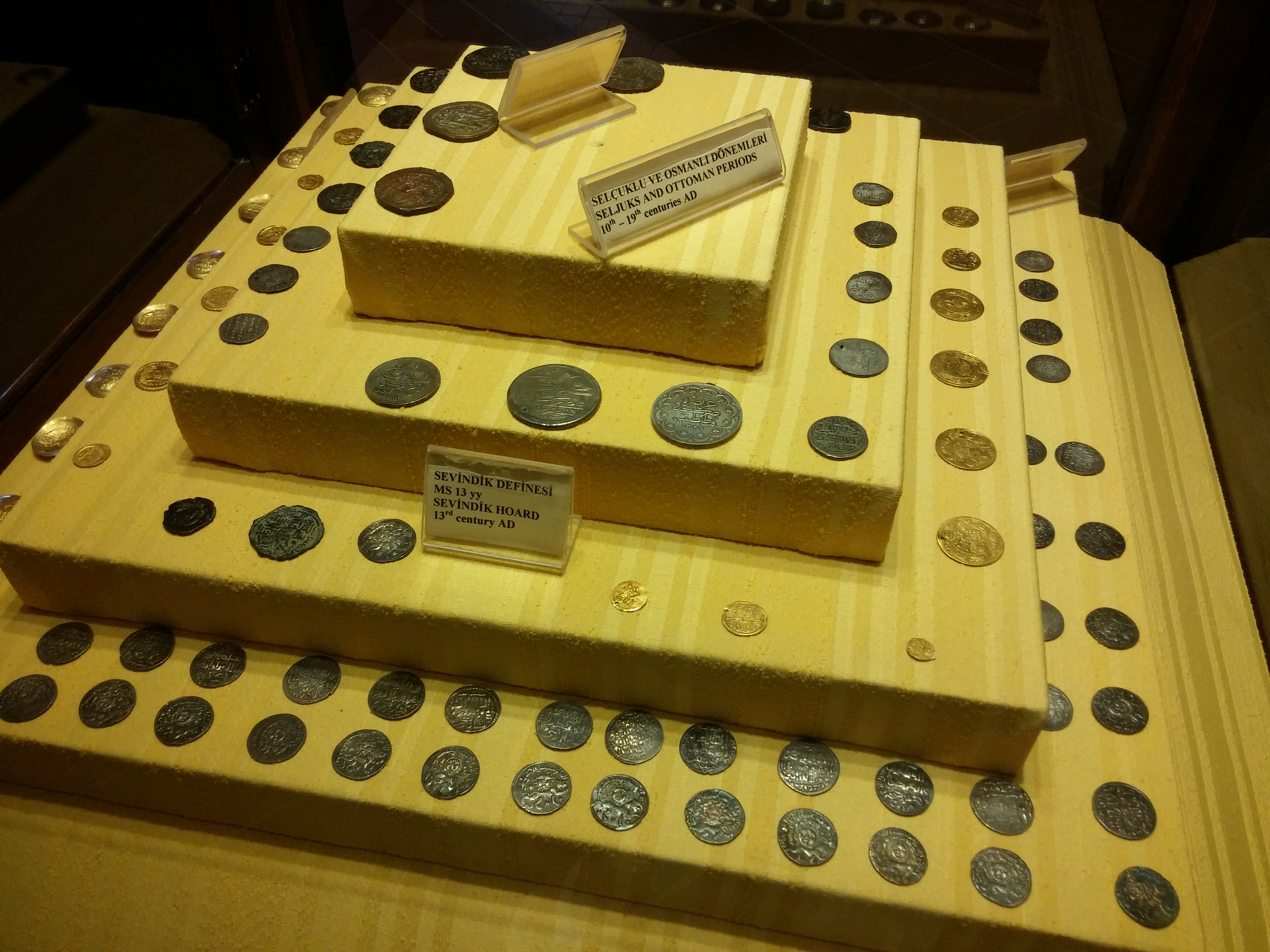
Ancient coins

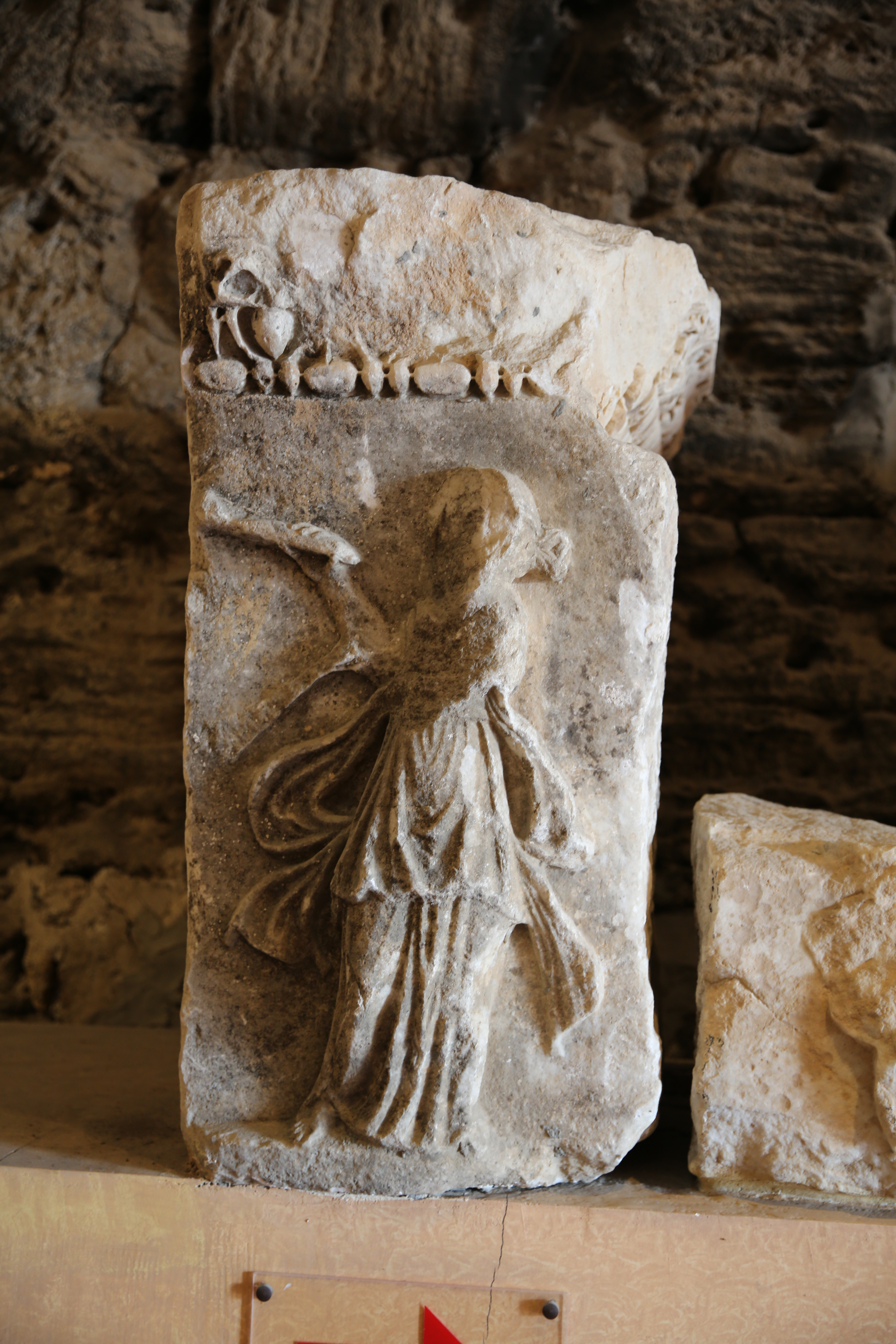
