= Cadmus (river) =

River in Turkey

Cadmus or Cadmos (Greek: Κάδμος), was the ancient name for a river that flowed from Mount Cadmus, in ancient Phrygia. The river, probably the modern Gökpınar (in Aydın Province, Turkey), which flows into the Lycus, a tributary of the Maeander. (Hamilton, Researches, &c., vol. i. p. 513.)
