= Colossae =

Ancient city of Phrygia

- Κολοσσαί (Ancient Greek)
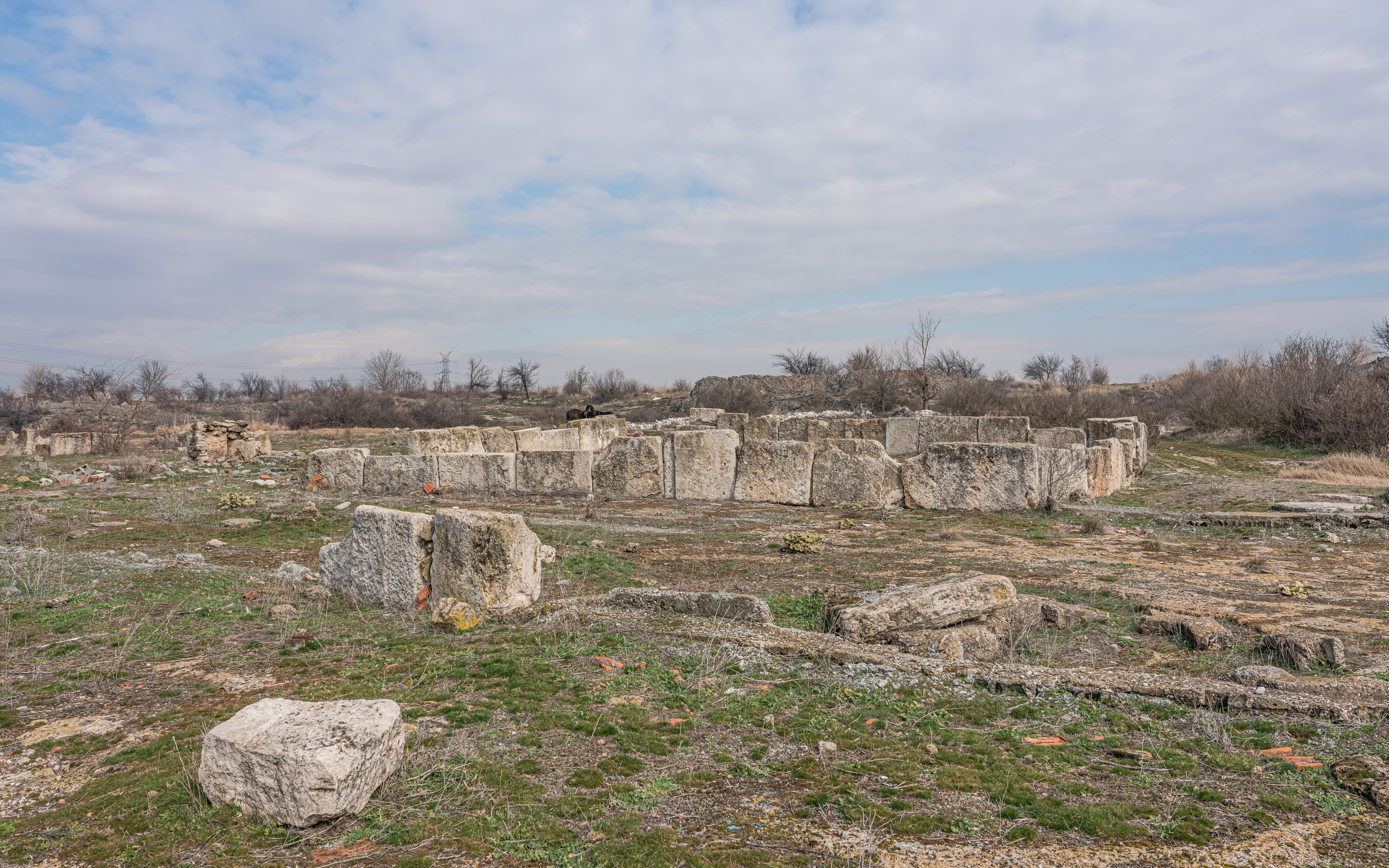
- Ruins of Colossae

- Location within Turkey Location within Asia
- 37°47′12″N 29°15′36″E
- Region: Phrygia
- Part of: West Asia

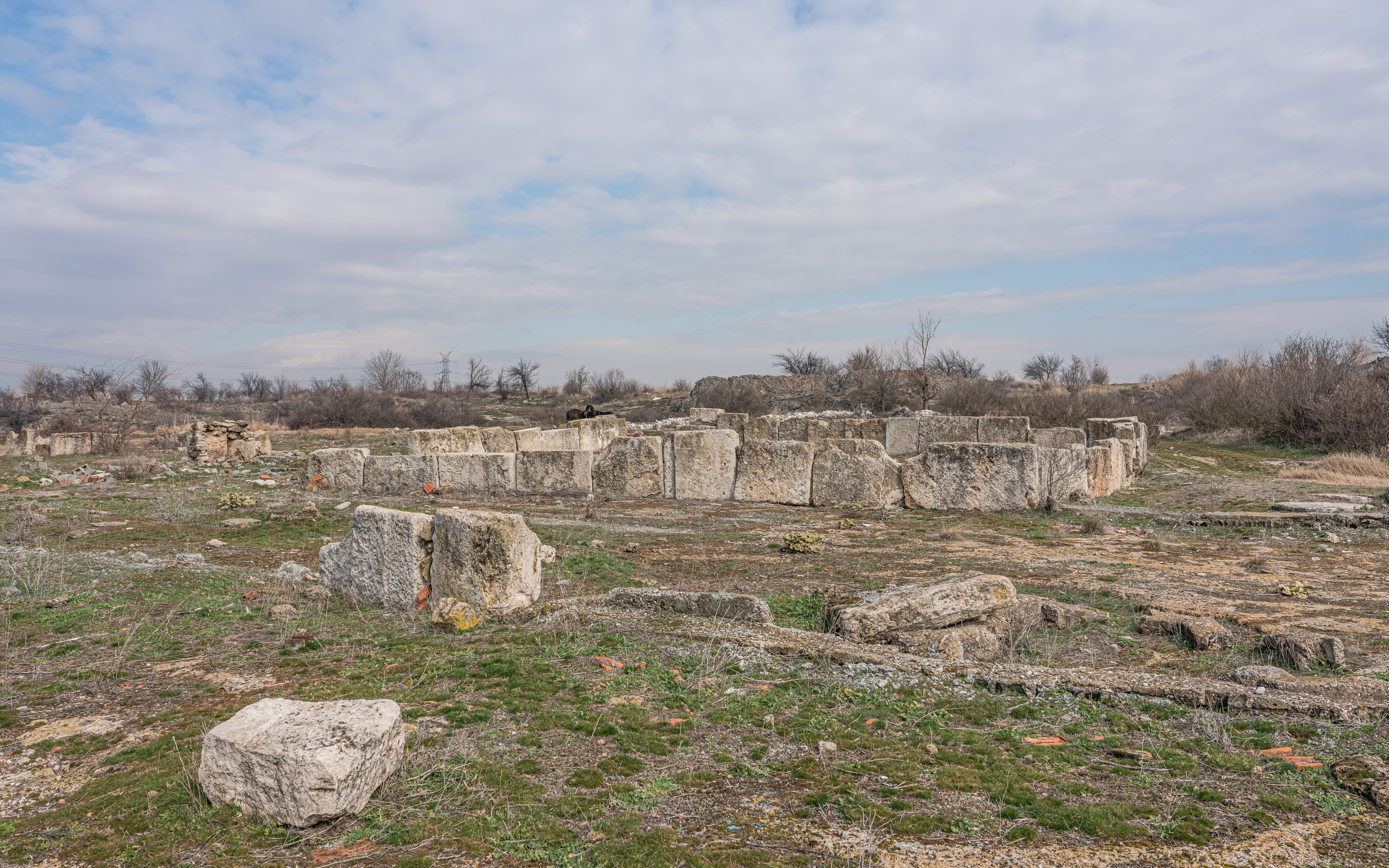
Ruins of Colossae

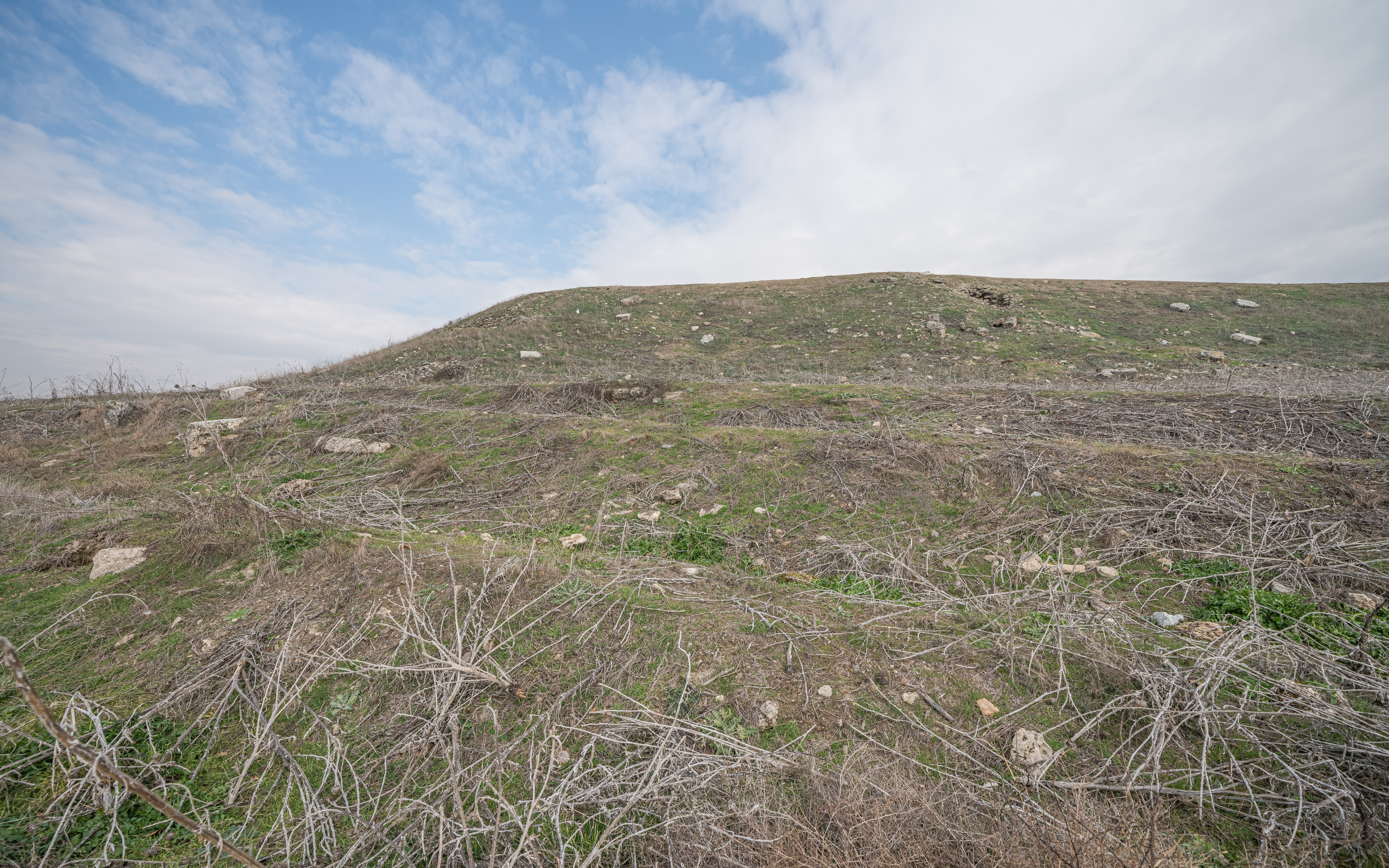
Colossae's acropolis

Colossae (/kəˈlɒsi/; Ancient Greek: Κολοσσαί), sometimes called Colosse, also identified by medieval writers as Chonae (Greek: Χῶναι), was a city in Phrygia, in southern Asia Minor.

A significant city from the 5th century BC onwards, it was notable for its healing springs and, later, for its veneration of the Archangel Michael. The Epistle to the Colossians, an early Christian text which identifies its author as Paul the Apostle, is addressed to the church in Colossae. The city was part of the Roman and Byzantine province of Phrygia Pacatiana.

== Location and geography ==
Colossae was in Phrygia, in Asia Minor. It was located 15 km (9.3 mi) southeast of Laodicea on the road through the Lycus Valley near the Lycus River at the foot of Mt. Cadmus, the highest mountain in Turkey's western Aegean Region, between the cities of Sardis and Celaenae, and southeast of the ancient city of Hierapolis. Herodotus said that at Colossae "the river Lycos falls into an opening of the earth and disappears from view, and then after an interval of about five furlongs it comes up to view again, and this river also flows into the Meander River". Ancient Colossae is situated in the modern province of Honaz, to the north of its later medieval counterpart of Chonae, with what remains of the buried ruins of Colossae ("the mound") lying 3 km (1.9 mi) to the north of Honaz.

== Origin and etymology of place name ==
The medieval poet Manuel Philes incorrectly said that the name Colossae was connected to the Colossus of Rhodes. More recently, in an interpretation that ties Colossae to an Indo-European root that happens to be shared with the word kolossos, Jean-Pierre Vernant has connected the name to the idea of setting up a sacred space or shrine. Another proposal relates the name to the Greek kolazo 'to punish'. Others have said the name derives from its manufacture of dyed wool, or colossinus.

== History ==
=== Late Bronze Age ===
The first mention of the city may be in a 17th-century BC Hittite inscription, which speaks of a city called Huwalušija, which some archeologists believe is a reference to early Colossae.

=== Classical Age ===
==== Persian period ====
The 5th-century geographer Herodotus first mentions Colossae by name and said it was a "great city in Phrygia", which accommodates the Persian king Xerxes I while en route to wage war against the Greeks in the Greco-Persian Wars, showing the city had already reached a certain level of wealth and size by this time. Writing in the 5th century BC, Xenophon said Colossae was "a populous city, wealthy and of considerable magnitude". Strabo said the city drew great revenue from its sheep, and that the wool of Colossae gave its name to a colour, colossinus.

In 396 BC, Colossae was the site of the execution of the rebellious Persian satrap Tissaphernes, who was lured there and slain by an agent of the party of Cyrus the Younger.

==== Roman period ====
By the 1st century it had dwindled greatly in size and significance. The city was decimated by an earthquake in the 60s AD, and was rebuilt independently of the support of Rome.

==== Early Christian history ====
The canonical biblical text Epistle to the Colossians is addressed to the Christian community in Colossae. The epistle has traditionally been attributed to Paul the Apostle due to its autobiographical salutation and style, but some modern critical scholars now believe it to be written by another author some time after Paul's death. It is believed that one aim of the letter was to address the challenges that the community faced in its context of the syncretistic Gnostic religions that were developing in Asia Minor.

According to the epistle, Epaphras seems to have been a person of some importance in the Christian community in Colossae, and tradition presents him as its first bishop. The epistle also seems to imply that Paul had never visited the city, because it only speaks of him having "heard" of the Colossians' faith, and in the Epistle to Philemon Paul tells Philemon of his hope to visit Colossae upon being freed from prison. Tradition also gives Philemon as the second bishop of the see.

The Apostolic Constitutions list Philemon as a bishop of Colossae. On the other hand, the Catholic Encyclopedia considers Philemon doubtful. The first historically documented bishop is Epiphanius, who was not personally at the Council of Chalcedon, but whose metropolitan bishop Nunechius of Laodicea, the capital of the Roman province of Phrygia Pacatiana, signed the acts on his behalf.

Colossae was associated with a miracle, where a sacristan named Archippos was said to have witnessed the Archangel thwart a plan by non-Christians to destroy a church by flooding it with the waters of nearby mountain rivers. The Archangel with his staff opened a wide fissure in a rock and commanded the rushing water to plunge into it, saving the church. The Eastern Orthodox Church commemorates this event on September 6, and the city of Colossae was identified as Chonae (meaning "to plunge") since. Though according to modern researchers, the locations of the ancient city of Colossae and the medieval city of Chonae are separate from one another, as Colossae was situated further to the north.

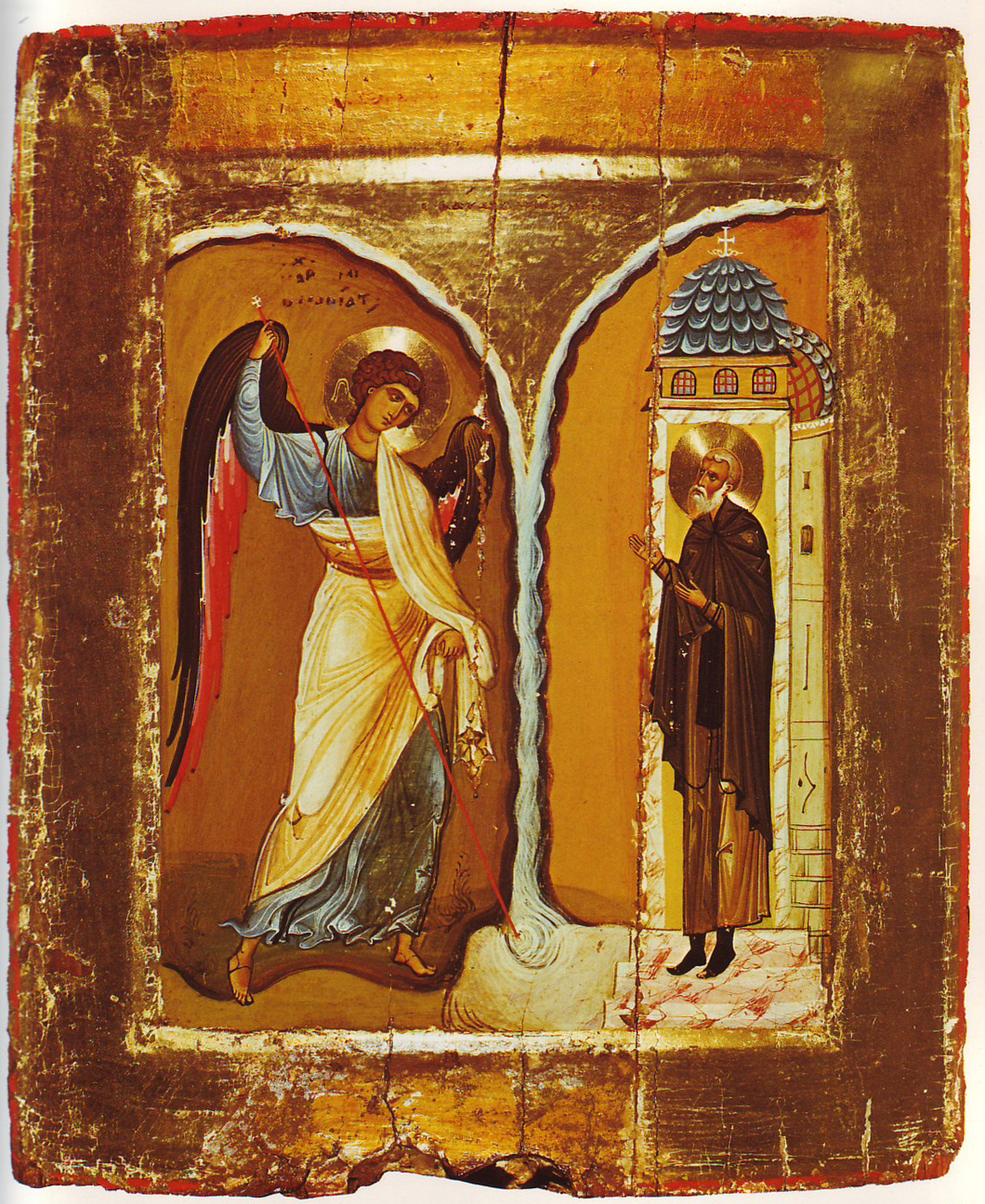
The apparition of Archangel Michael in the Springs of Colossae, depicted in the 12th century icon from the St. Catherine's Monastery.

=== Middle Ages ===
==== Byzantine period ====
The city's fame and renowned status continued into the Byzantine period, when the settlement was distinguished in 858 as a Metropolitan See and possibly served as the capital of the Thracesian Theme from the 7th to the 11th century. The Byzantines also built the Church of Archangel Michael in the vicinity of Chonae, one of the largest churches in the Middle East. The town may have decreased in size, or may have even been temporarily abandoned due to Arab invasions in the 7th and 8th centuries, but it soon recovered and became a vital economic and religious center.

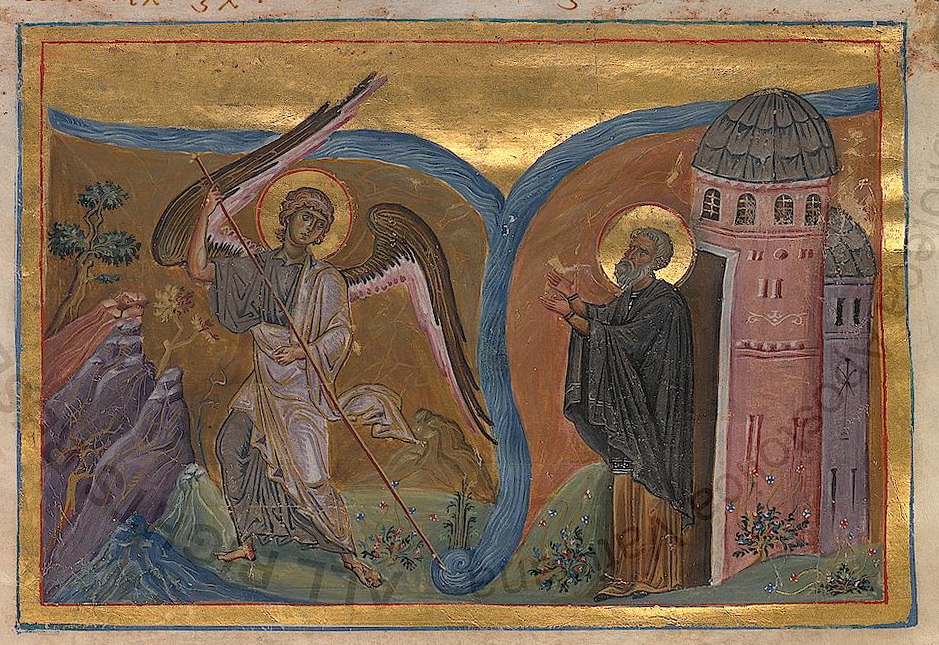
Miracle of the Archangel Michael at Colossae (Menologion of Basil II, c. 1000 AD)

In 1070 Chonae was sacked by the Seljuk Afshin, who killed its residents, pillaged the Church of Archangel Michael and turned the shrine into a horse stable for the invading Turkomans. The surviving residents of the city attempted to escape in a nearby cave close to a river, but the water level suddenly rose and flooded the cave, drowning all the survivors who escaped there.

The city slightly recovered during the Komnenian period, and became a suffragan diocese of Laodicea in Phyrigia Pacatiana. Chonae and its church were ravaged on two more occasions in the latter half of the 12th century by the Turkish mercenaries of the rebels Theodore Mangaphas and Pseudo-Alexios II. The Turks destroyed the mosaics, the altar, and then the church itself. The city was conquered by the Seljuks and was governed by the Byzantine renegade Manuel Maurozomes until 1230. In 1257 Chonae (along with Laodikeia and the two fortresses of Sakaina and Ypsele) were given to the Empire of Nicaea by Sultan Kaykaus II, in exchange for military support in regaining Iconium, but only a few years later the city was lost to Turkomans.

==== Late Christian history ====
In 1370 the metropolitanate of Chonae was assumed by Kytaion and in 1384 it was assumed by Laodicea, following the decline of its Christian population during the period of the Anatolian Beyliks.

== Modern study and archeology ==
Most archeological attention has been focused on nearby Laodicea and Hierapolis. Excavations of Colossae began in 2021 led by Bariş Yener of Pammukale University in Denizli. The first several years involve surface surveys to analyze pottery and survey the landscape. They hope to start digging in 2023–24.

The site exhibits a biconical acropolis almost 100 feet (30 m) high, and encompasses an area of almost 22 acres (8.9 ha). On the eastern slope there sits a theater which probably seated around 5,000 people, suggesting a total population of 25,000–30,000 people. The theater was probably built during the Roman period, and may be near an agora that abuts the cardo maximus, or the city's main north–south road. Ceramic finds around the theater confirm the city's early occupation in the third and second millennia BC. Northeast of the tell, and most likely outside the city walls, a necropolis displays Hellenistic tombs with two main styles of burial: one with an antecedent room connected to an inner chamber, and tumuli, or underground chambers accessed by stairs leading to the entrance. Outside the tell, there are also remains of sections of columns that may have marked a processional way, or the cardo. Today, the remains of one column marks the location where locals believe a church once stood, possibly that of Archangel Michael. Near the Lycus River, there is evidence that water channels had been cut out of the rock with a complex of pipes and sluice gates to divert water for bathing and for agricultural and industrial purposes.

=== Modern legacy ===
The holiness and healing properties associated with the waters of Colossae during the Byzantine era continue to this day, particularly at a pool fed by the Lycus River at the Göz picnic grounds west of Colossae at the foot of Mt. Cadmus. Locals consider the water to be therapeutic.

== Notable people ==
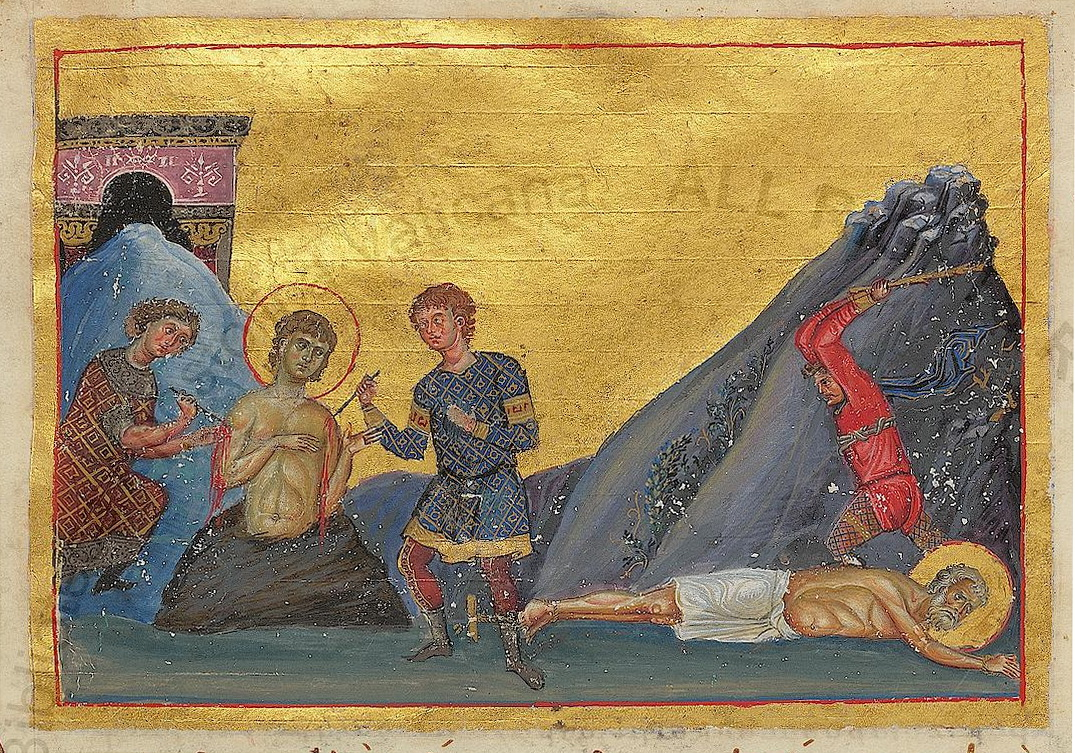
Depiction of the deaths of Archippus and Philemon (Menologion of Basil II c. 1000 AD)

- Epaphras (died 1st century AD), Christian Saint, bishop of Colossae and martyr
- Archippus (died 1st century AD), Christian Saint, bishop of Laodicea and martyr
- Philemon (died 68 AD), Christian Saint, bishop of Gaza and martyr
- Apphia (died 68 AD), wife of Philemon, Christian Saint and martyr
- Onesimus (died c. 107), Christian Saint and martyr, possibly bishop of Ephesus and Byzantium
- Michael Choniates (1138–1222), Byzantine chronicler, archbishop of Athens and Saint
- Niketas Choniates (1155–1217), Byzantine historian and government official

== See also ==
- List of ancient Greek cities
