= Hierapolis =

Ancient Greek city

- Ἱεράπολις (Greek)
- Hierapolis-Pamukkale
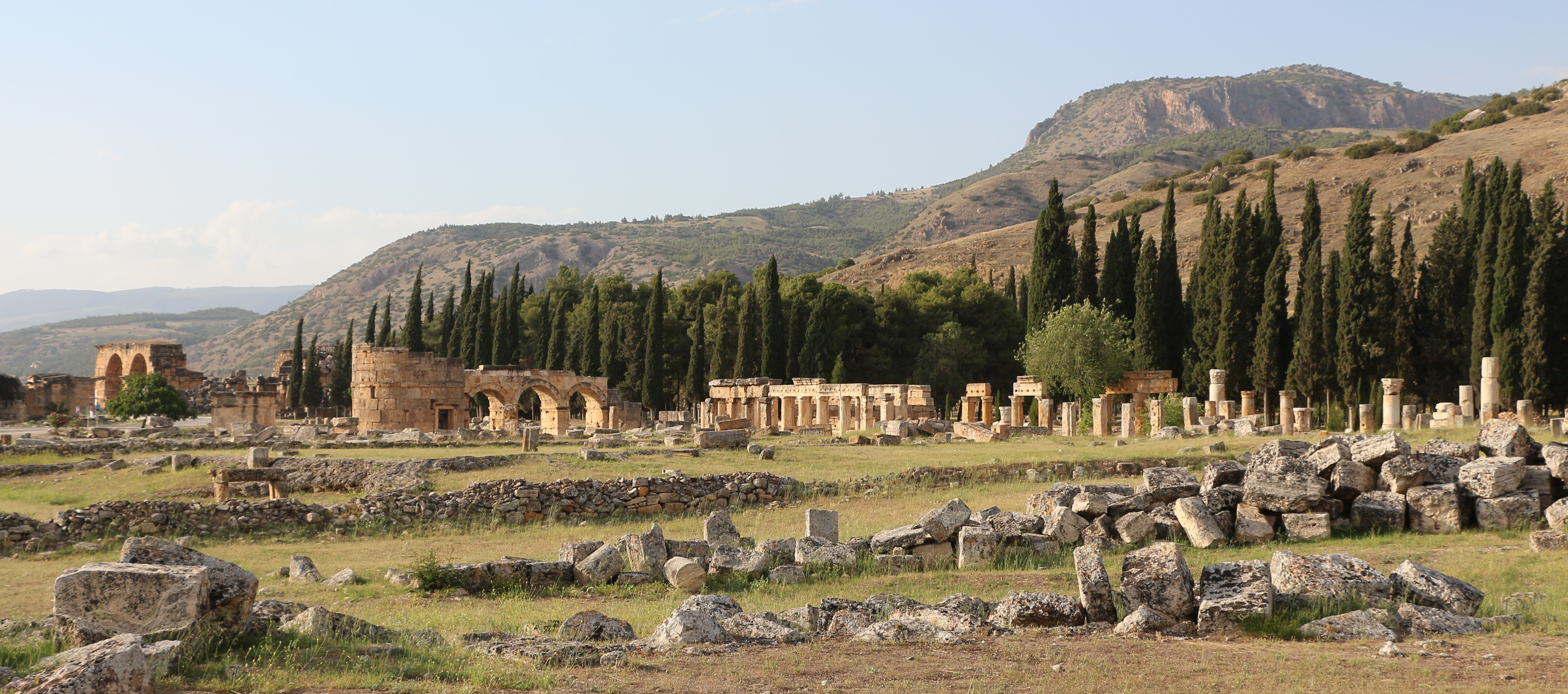

- Location within Turkey
- 37°55′30″N 29°07′33″E
- Type: Settlement
- Periods: Roman Republican to High Medieval
- Location: Pamukkale, Denizli Province, Turkey
- Region: Phrygia

History
- Built: early 2nd century BC
- Abandoned: 14th century (final occasion)

Site notes
- Excavation dates: 1887, 1957–2008
- Archaeologists: Carl Humann, Paolo Verzone

UNESCO World Heritage Site
- Official name: Hierapolis-Pamukkale
- Type: Mixed
- Criteria: iii, iv, vii
- Designated: 1988 (12th session)
- Reference no.: 485
- UNESCO Region: Europe and North America

Hierapolis (/ˌhaɪəˈræpəlɪs/; Ancient Greek: Ἱεράπολις 'holy city') was a Hellenistic Greek city in Phrygia, in southwestern Anatolia, Turkey. It was founded in the 3rd century BC, on the site of a Phrygian cult center of the Anatolian mother goddess Cybele, It was famous for its hot springs, its high quality wool fabrics and dyes, and as the birthplace of the Stoic philosopher Epictetus. Its extensive remains are adjacent to modern Pamukkale in Turkey.

The hot springs have been used as a spa since at least the 2nd century BCE, with many patrons retiring or dying there as evidenced by the large necropolis filled with tombs, most famously that of Marcus Aurelius Ammianos, which bears a relief depicting the earliest known example of a crank and rod mechanism, and the Tomb of Philip the Apostle.

Hierapolis-Pamukkale was added as a UNESCO World Heritage Site in 1988. The Italian Archaeological Mission of Hierapolis of Phrygia (MAIER) has operated at the site since 1957 and is currently directed by Grazia Semeraro, Professor of Classical Archaeology at the University of Salento.

== Geography ==
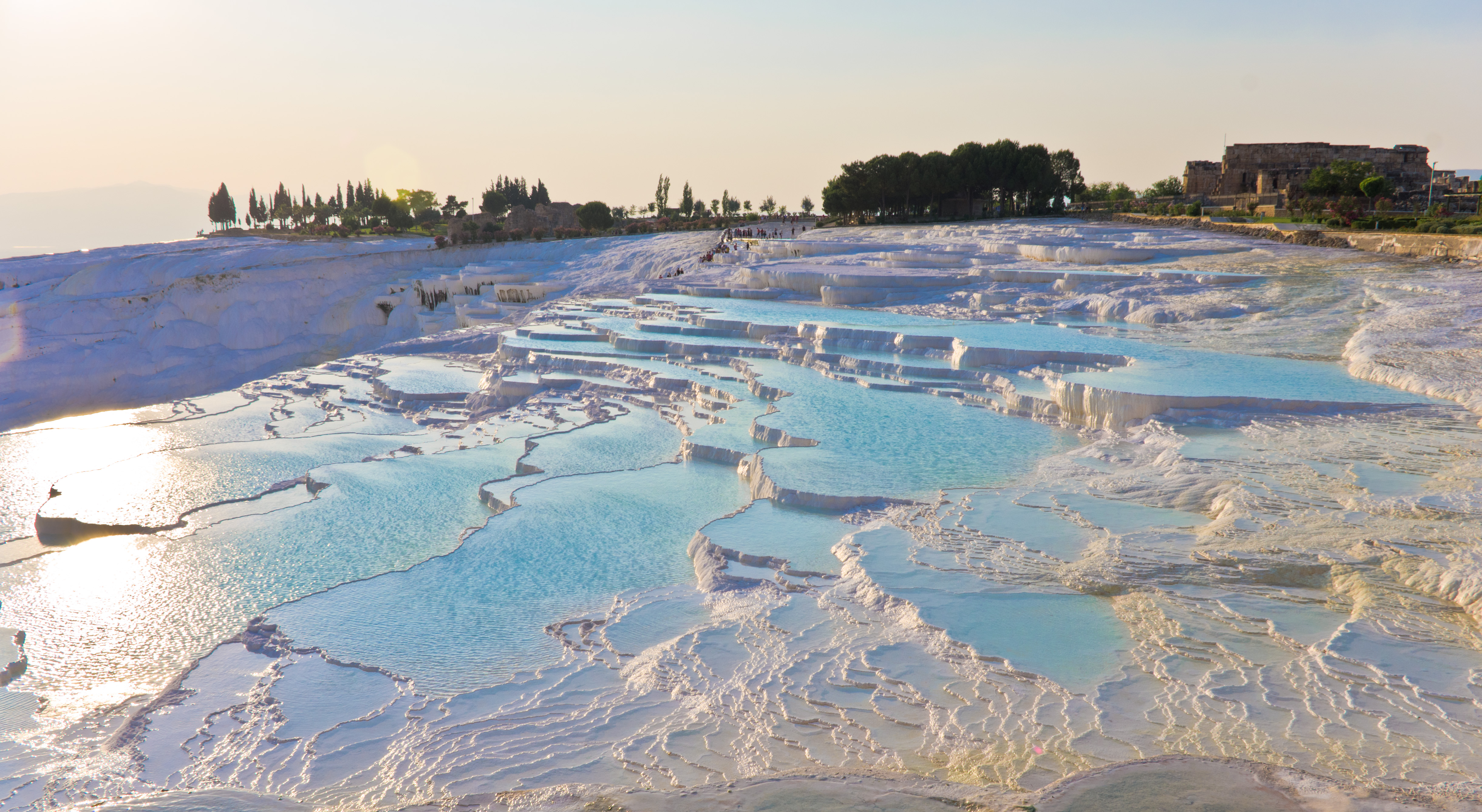
Pamukkale natural formations are a part of the ancient city.

Hierapolis is located on a terrace 300 feet above the Lycus river (modern Çürüksu), a tributary of the Büyük Menderes (the classical Meander), across the valley from ancient Laodicea on the Lycus and modern Denizli. It is adjacent to the geological formation of Pamukkale, meaning "cotton castle" in Turkish, famous for its travertine limestone terraces deposited by the hot springs. Hierapolis was located on the main road from Iconium to Ephesus, which facilitated trade with the Aegean region.

== History ==
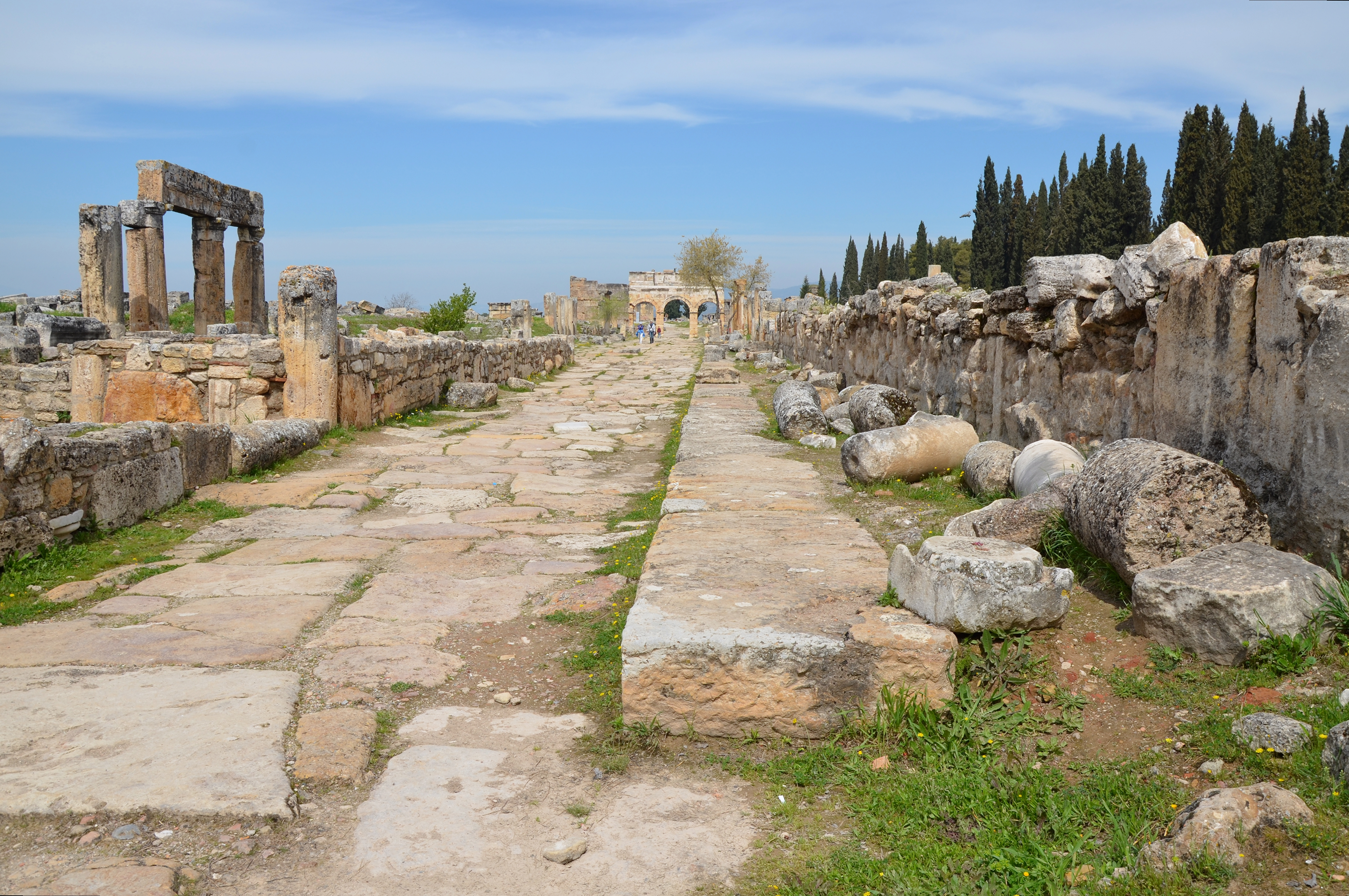
The main street of Hierapolis

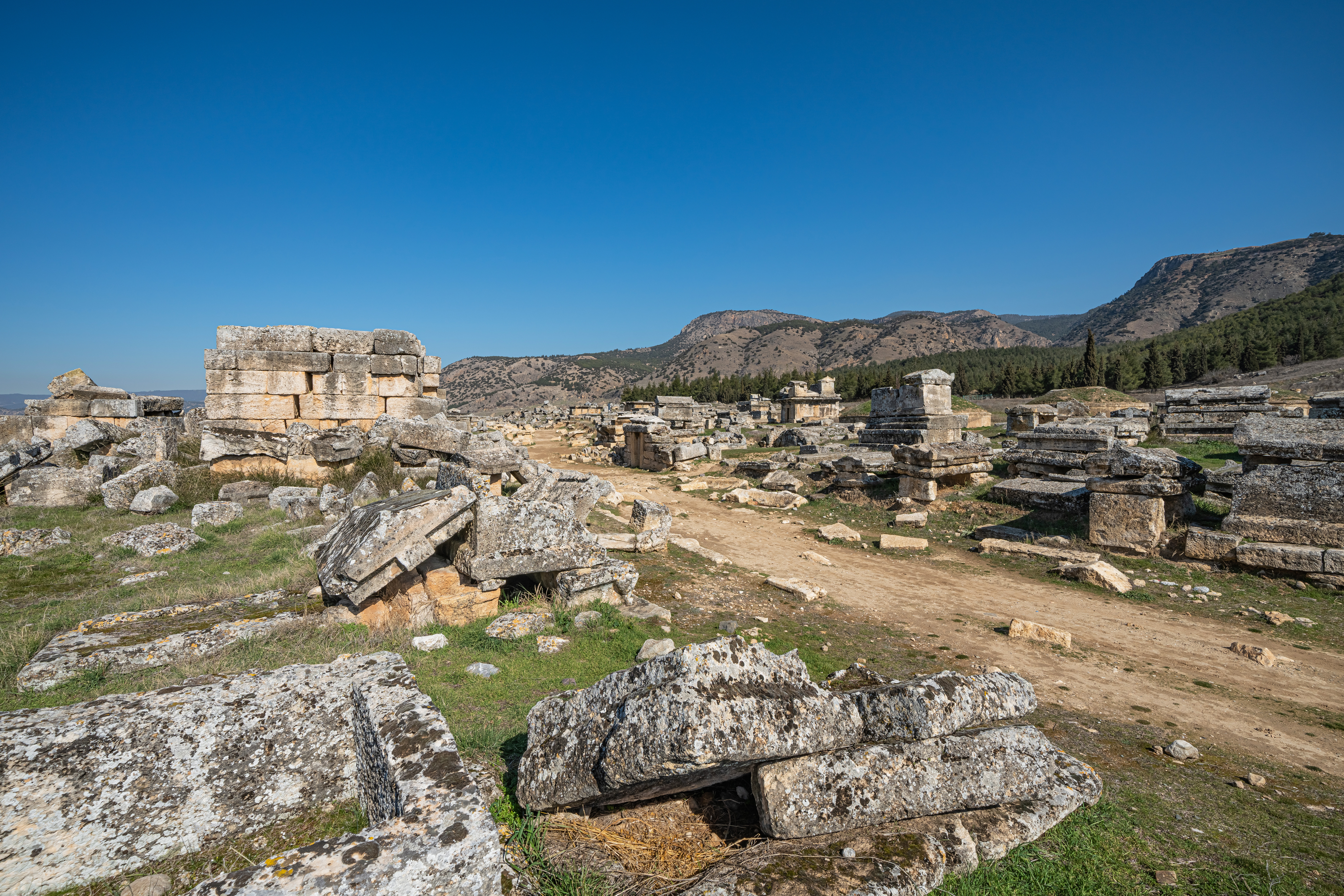
Part of the archeological site of Hierapolis

=== Iron Age ===
In 2016, excavations were carried out in the Northern Necropolis area of Hierapolis at the entrance of the Archaeological Park by the archaeologists from Denizli Hierapolis Archeology Museum. During these excavations, Iron Age settlement structures were unearthed for the first time in Hierapolis. There are round huts belonging to a large settlement believed to cover the side of the Çökelez Mountain overlooking the wide plain of the Lykos River. Before the Greek colony was established the cult area dedicated to Cybele around a cave and the surrounding rocks was the center of the archaic settlement.

=== Phrygian temple ===
The Phrygians built a temple dedicated to the mother goddess Cybele on the site probably in the first half of the 7th century BC. This temple, originally used by the indigenous communities living in the Lycus valley would later form the center of Hierapolis. When the Greek colonists arrived and built the city on the pre-existing pattern of settlement, the ancient cult of Cybele was gradually assimilated into the Greek religion.

From well before the time of the Greek colonization, the area was seen as a gateway to the underworld and a place of communication with the underworld deities because of the toxic gasses that emerge from a hot spring inside the cave. According to Strabon and Damascius the temple built on top of the cave was linked to the mother goddess Cybele. The eunuch priests of the Mother Goddess were believed to be the only ones that would not be asphyxiated by the gases of the cave. The hot springs were a major draw to city. After the process of assimilation into Greek culture, it was associated with Hades (Pluton) and Persephone instead of Cybele and the temple was named Plutonium.

=== Hellenistic city ===
Hierapolis was founded by the Seleucids in the time of Antiochus I (281–261 BC) and received polis status by Eumenes of Pergamon (197–160 BC). The city was famous for its high quality woollen fabrics and dye products. While the Phrygian inhabitants of the valley were gradually Hellenised, Hierapolis was a Greek foundation from the start.

Antiochus the Great sent 2,000 Jewish families to Lydia and Phrygia from Babylon and Mesopotamia, later joined by more from Judea. The Jewish congregation grew in Hierapolis and has been estimated as high as 50,000 in 62 BC. The city was expanded with the booty from the 190 BC Battle of Magnesia where Antiochus the Great was defeated by the Roman ally Eumenes II. Following the Treaty of Apamea ending the Syrian War, Eumenes annexed much of Asia Minor, including Hierapolis.

Hierapolis became a healing centre where doctors used the thermal springs as a treatment for their patients. The city began minting bronze coins in the 2nd century BC. These coins give the name Hieropolis. It remains unclear whether this name referred to the original temple (ἱερόν, hieron) or honoured Hiera, the wife of Telephus, son of Heracles and the Mysian princess Auge, the supposed founder of Pergamon's Attalid dynasty. This name eventually changed into Hierapolis ("holy city"), according to the Byzantine geographer Stephanus on account of its large number of temples.

=== Roman Hierapolis ===
In 133 BC, when Attalus III died, he bequeathed his kingdom to Rome. Hierapolis thus became part of the Roman province of Asia. Unlike other cities in the region, it was never reconstituted as a Roman colony, though some Romanization took place. In AD 17, during the rule of the emperor Tiberius, a major earthquake destroyed the city. The philosopher Epictetus was born as a slave in the city in 50 AD.

Through the influence of the Christian apostle Paul, a church was founded here while he was at Ephesus. The Christian apostle Philip spent the last years of his life here. The town's martyrium was alleged to have been built upon the spot where Philip was crucified in AD 80. His daughters were also said to have acted as prophetesses in the region.

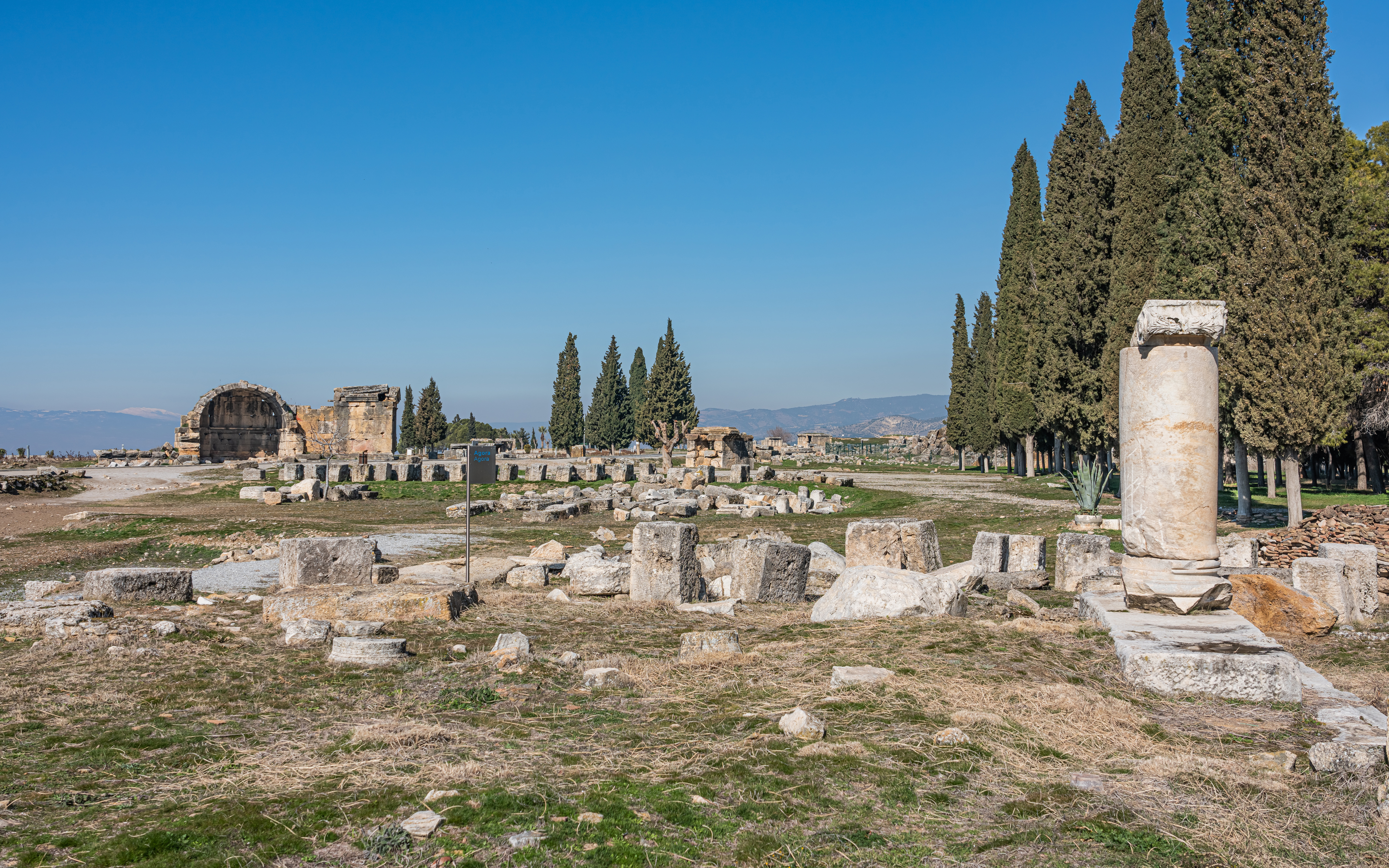
The Agora

In the year 60, during the rule of Nero, an even more severe earthquake left the city completely in ruins. Afterwards, the city was rebuilt in the Roman style with imperial financial support. It was during this period that the city attained its present form. The theatre was built in 129 for a visit by the emperor Hadrian. It was renovated under Septimius Severus (193–211). When Caracalla visited the town in 215, he bestowed the much-coveted title of neocoros upon it, according the city certain privileges and the right of sanctuary. This was the golden age of Hierapolis. Thousands of people came to benefit from the medicinal properties of the hot springs. New building projects were started: two Roman baths, a gymnasium, several temples, a main street with a colonnade, and a fountain at the hot spring. Hierapolis became one of the most prominent cities in the Roman Empire in the fields of the arts, philosophy, and trade. The town grew to 100,000 inhabitants and became wealthy. During his campaign against the Sassanid Shapur II in 370, the emperor Valens made the last-ever imperial visit to the city.

=== Ecclesiastic history ===
During the 4th century, the Christians filled Pluto's Gate (a ploutonion) with stones, suggesting that Christianity had become the dominant religion and begun displacing other faiths in the area. Originally a see of Phrygia Pacatiana, the Byzantine emperor Justinian raised the bishop of Hierapolis to the rank of metropolitan in 531. The Roman baths were transformed to a Christian basilica. During the Byzantine period, the city continued to flourish and also remained an important centre for Christianity.

=== Medieval Hierapolis ===
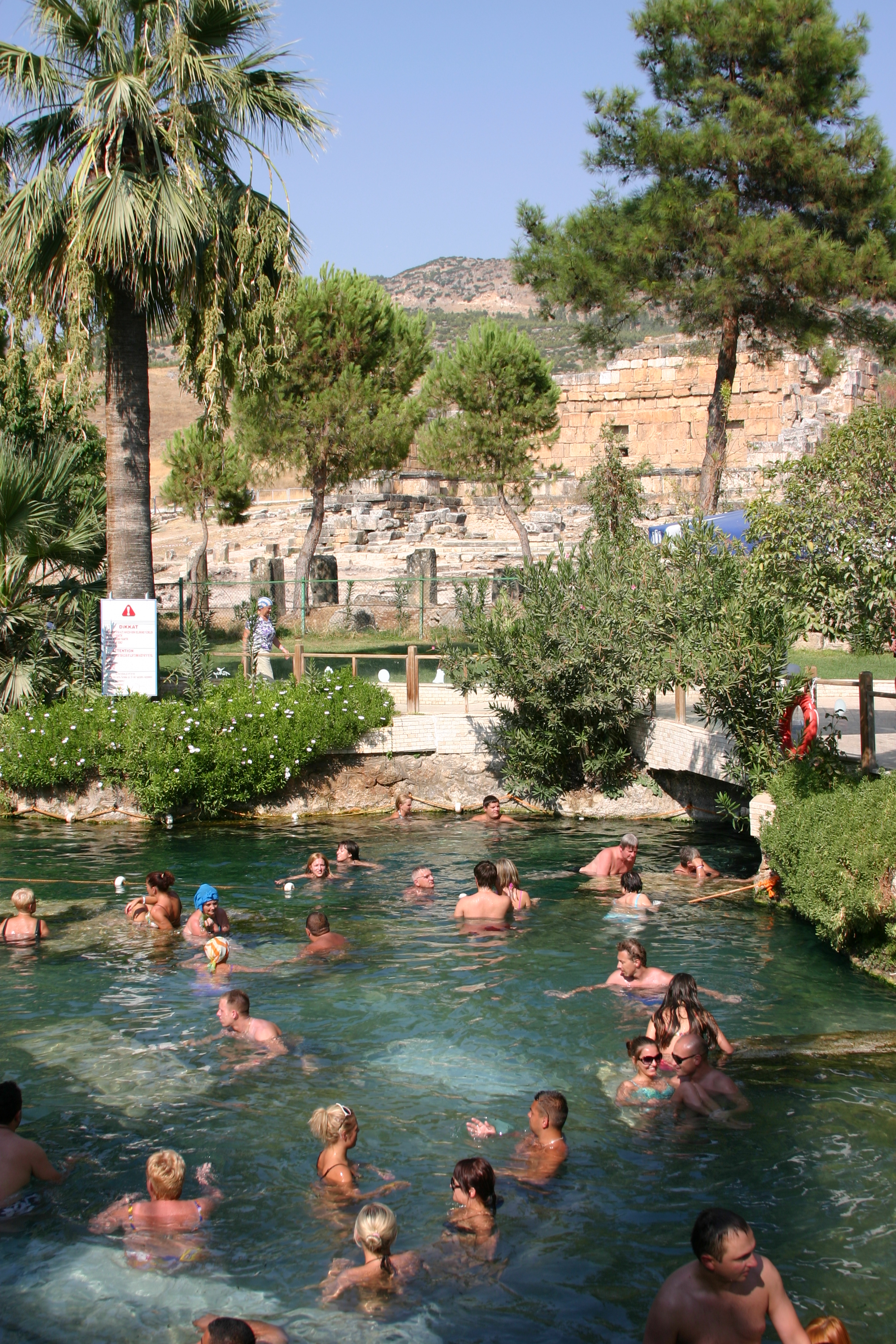
Pools in Hierapolis

In the early 7th century, the town was devastated first by Persian armies and then by another destructive earthquake, from which it took a long time to recover.

In the 12th century, the area came under the control of the Seljuk sultanate of Konya before falling to crusaders under Frederick Barbarossa and their Byzantine allies in 1190. About thirty years later, the town was abandoned before the Seljuks built a castle in the 13th century. The new settlement was abandoned in the late 14th century. In 1354, the Fall of Gallipoli toppled the remains of the ancient city. The ruins were slowly covered with a thick layer of limestone.

=== Modern excavations ===
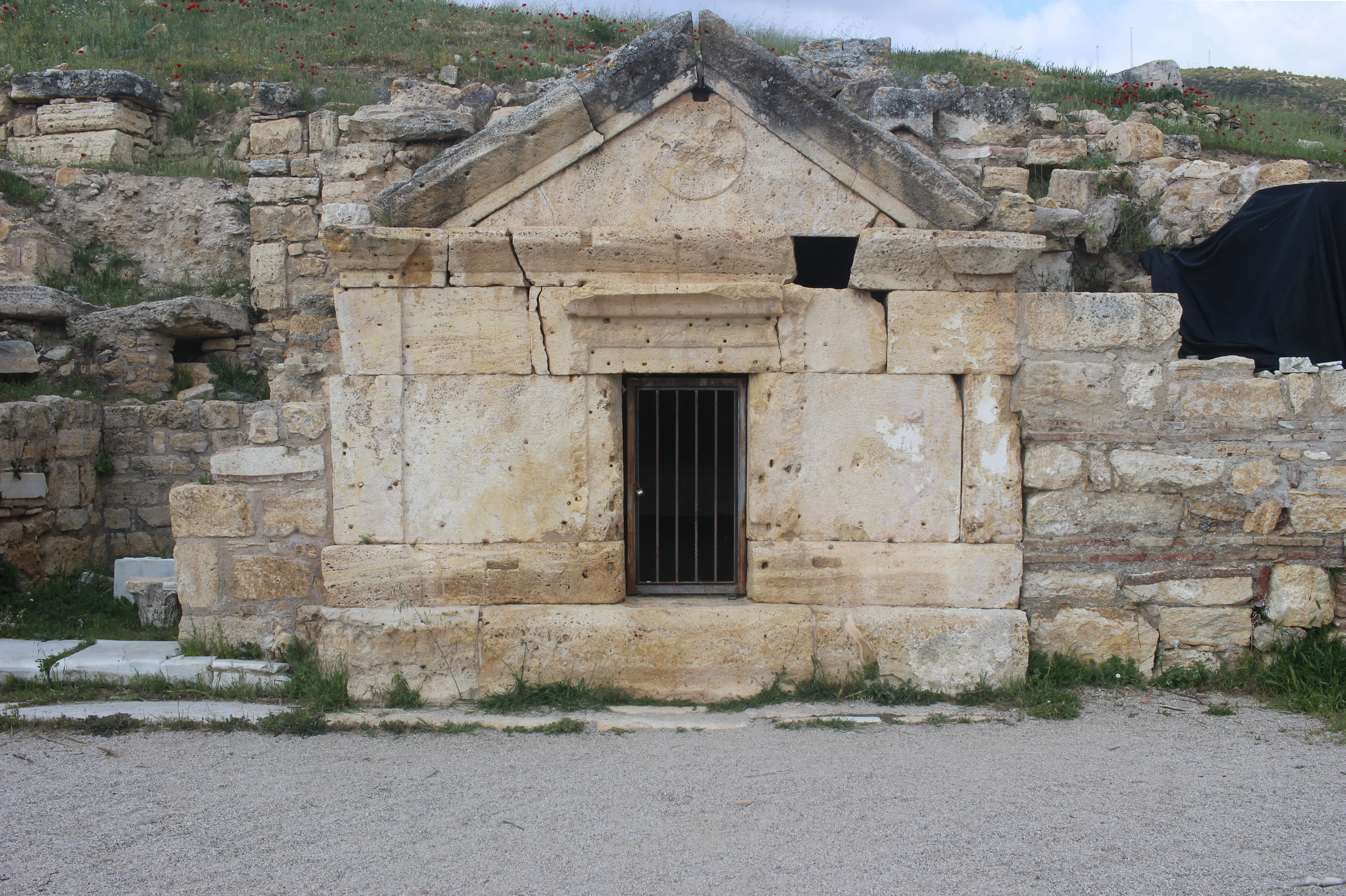
Tomb of Philip the Apostle, Hierapolis

Hierapolis was first excavated by the German archaeologist Carl Humann during June and July 1887. His excavation notes were published in his 1889 book Altertümer von Hierapolis. His excavations were rather general and included a number of drilling holes. He would gain fame for his later discovery of the Pergamon Altar, which was transferred to Berlin and reconstructed in the Pergamon Museum.

After the large white limestone formations of the hot springs became famous again in the 20th century, it was turned into a tourist attraction named "Cotton Castle" (Pamukkale). The ancient city was rediscovered by travellers, but also partially destroyed by new hotels that were built there. These buildings have been removed in recent years; however, the hot water pool of one hotel was retained, and (for a fee) it is possible to swim amongst ancient stone remains.

Excavations began in earnest in 1957 when Italian scientists, led by Paolo Verzone, began working on the site. These studies continued into 2008 when a restoration of the site began. Large columns along the main street near the gate named for Domitian were erected again. A number of houses from the Byzantine period were also unearthed, including an 11th-century courtyard house. Many statues and friezes were transported to museums in London, Berlin, and Rome.

== Significant structures ==
=== The Main Street and the gates ===
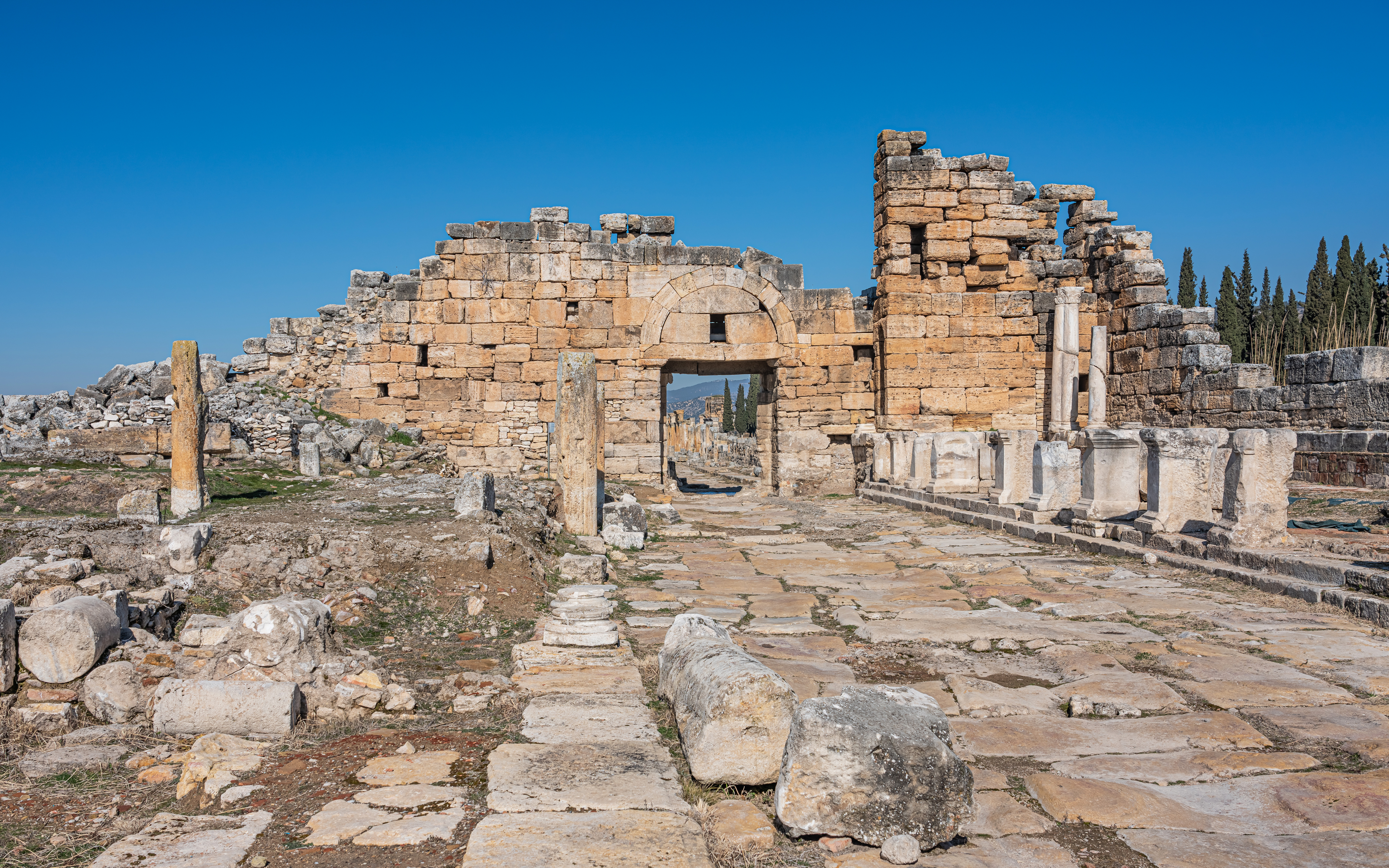
The main street

The Hellenistic city was built on a grid with streets running parallel or perpendicular to the main thoroughfare. This main street ran from north to south close to a cliff with the travertine terraces. It was about 1,500 metres (4,900 ft) long and 13.5 metres (44 ft) wide and was bordered on both sides by an arcade. At both ends of the main street, there was a monumental gate flanked by square towers built of massive blocks of stone. The side streets were about 3 metres (9.8 ft) wide. Another gate, the Domitian Gate, was close to the northern city gate. This triumphal arch flanked by circular towers consists of three arches and was built by the proconsul Julius Frontinus (84–86).

The town was repeatedly rebuilt following major earthquakes and improved prior to various imperial visits to the healing springs. In addition, Septimius Severus had a number of new buildings constructed in Hierapolis in gratitude for his secretary Antipater, a native of Hierapolis who also tutored the emperor's two sons.

==== Frontinus Gate ====
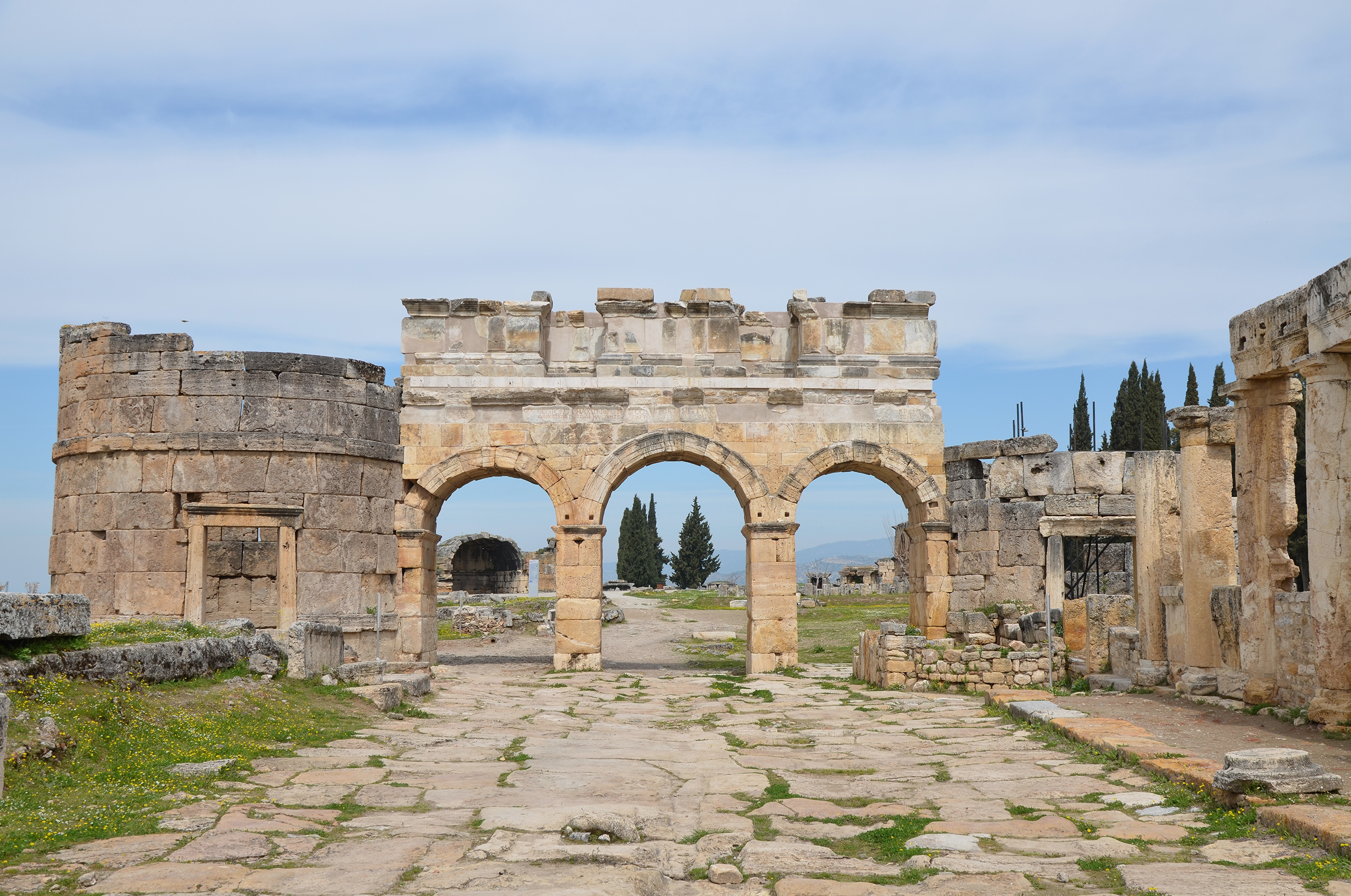
Frontinus Gate

This is the monumental entrance to the Roman city and leads onto the large plateia, 14 m wide, which crosses the whole settlement, exiting a gate at the opposite side, to connect with the road that goes to Laodicea on the Lykos and then Colossae. The well preserved structure has three openings in carefully squared travertine blocks, with elegant arches decorated with a simple cornice moulding, flanked by two round towers that recall Hellenistic city Gates such as that of the Pamphilian city of Perge, near Antalya.

==== North Byzantine Gate ====
The north gate forms part of a fortification system built at Hierapolis in Theodosian times (late 4th century) and is its monumental entrance, matched by a symmetrical gate to the south of the city. Built of reused material from the demolition of the Agora, it is flanked by two square towers, as in other nearby cities such as Blaundus. Four large marble brackets with heads of lions, of panther and of a Gorgon were found collapsed in front of the gate. They are quite expressive and, while belonging to antique buildings, were evidently reused as apotropaic elements on the two sides of the gate so as to ward off evil influence.

=== Theatre ===
The theatre was probably constructed under the reign of Hadrian after the earthquake of 60 AD. The facade is 300 feet (91 m) long, the full extent of which remains standing. In the cavea there are 50 rows of seats divided into seven parts by eight intermediate stairways. The diazoma, which divided the cavea into two, was entered by two vaulted passages (the vomitoria). There is an Imperial loge at the middle of the cavea and a 6-foot-high (1.83 m) wall surrounding the orchestra.

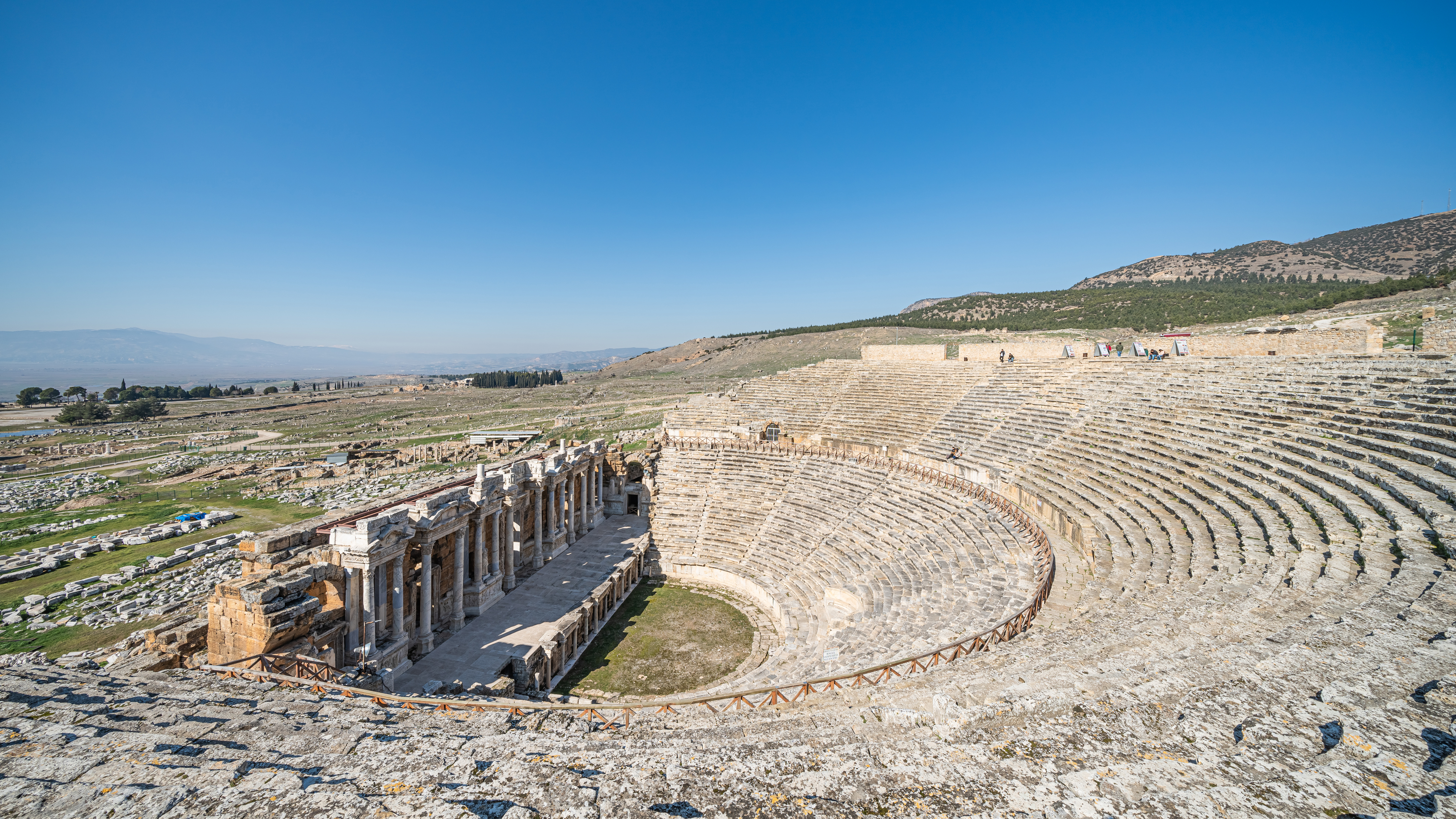
The Theatre

During the reign of Septimius Severus at the beginning of the 3rd century, the old scaenae frons was replaced by a new, more monumental one, organised on three storeys and flanked by two imposing side entry buildings. Sculptural reliefs, displaying mythological subjects, were placed on the different storeys, while dedicatory inscriptions ran along the entablatures. The transformation was outstanding due to the size of the structures, the high quality of workmanship and materials employed.

The auditorium was rebuilt as well, substituting the ancient limestone seats with others in marble, and realizing a high podium on the orchestra in order to adapt the building to the organization of venationes and gladiator schools.

An earthquake in Hierapolis in the 7th century caused the collapse of the entire building as well as the ultimate abandonment of the city. Since the 18th century, the monument's striking ruins have become a recurrent theme in European travellers' descriptions and engravings.

Septimius Severus is portrayed in a relief together with his wife Julia Domna, his two sons Caracalla and Geta, and the god Jupiter. In AD 352, the orchestra was probably transformed into an arena for aquatic shows, which had become fashionable. The stage, which is 12 ft (3.7 m) high, had five doors and six niches. In front of these there were ten marble columns, decorated with alternate rectilinear and curved segments. The wall behind the scene was decorated with three rows of columns one behind another. The columns on the front row do not have grooves and stood on octagonal bases.

The auditorium consisted of stacked seating with a capacity of 15,000 and was bisected by the main aisle. It featured an imperial box. The lower part originally had twenty rows and the upper part twenty five, but only thirty rows altogether have survived. The auditorium is segmented into nine aisles by means of eight vertical passageways with steps. The proscenium consisted of two stories with ornately decorated niches to the sides. Several statues, reliefs (including depictions of Apollo, Dionysus, and Diana), and decorative elements have been excavated by the Italian archaeological team and can be seen in the local museum.

The theatre has been the object of important restorations between 2004 and 2014.

=== Temple of Apollo ===
A temple was raised to Apollo Lairbenos, the town's principal god during the late Hellenistic period. This Apollo was linked to the ancient Anatolian sun god Lairbenos and the god of oracles Kareios. The site also included temples or shrines to Cybele, Artemis, Pluto, and Poseidon. Now only the foundations of the Hellenistic temple remain. The temple stood within a peribolos (15 by 20 metres (49 by 66 ft)) in Doric style.

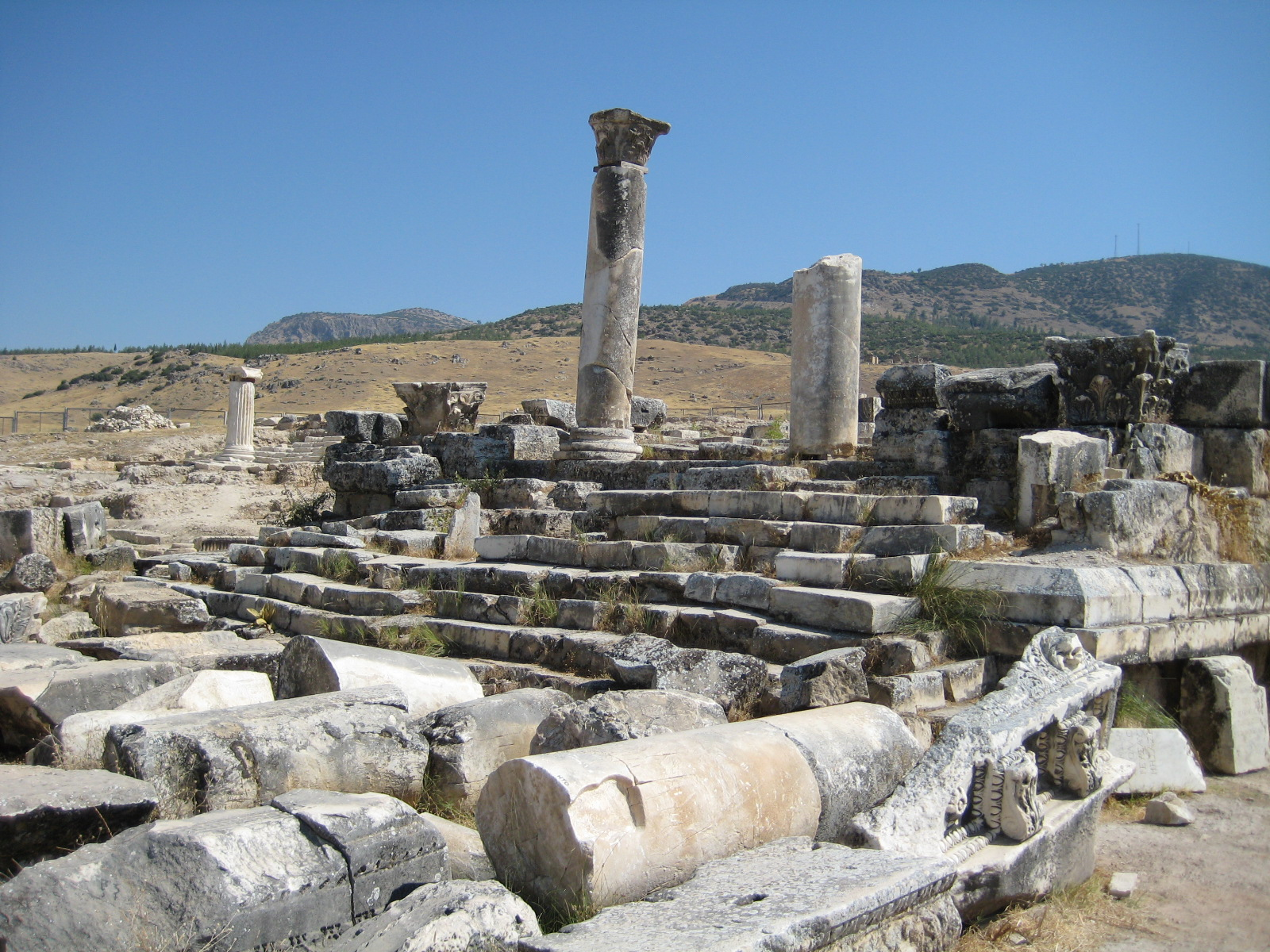
The Sanctuary of Apollo

The structures of the temple are later, though the presence of two Ionic capitals in the Museum (see under Museum), as well as of a Corinthian capital of the 1st century AD and other architectural fragments lead archaeologists to suppose the existence of an earlier temple on the site.

The temple, which has a marble staircase, lies within a sacred area, about 70 metres (230 ft) long. It was surrounded by an enclosure wall (temenos). The back of the temple was built against the hill, the peribolos was surrounded on the remaining southern, western and northern sides, by a marble portico, which has been partially excavated. This portico has pilasters bearing fluted Doric semi-columns supporting capitals that are decorated below with a row of astragali and beads and which, on the decorated below with a row of astragali and beads and which, on the echinus, bear a series of ovolos.

The new temple was reconstructed in the 3rd century in Roman fashion, recycling the stone blocks from the older temple. The reconstruction had a smaller area and now only its marble floor remains.

Following studies carried out on site in 1998, a geologist of the Italian National Research Council recognised that the origin of both the Temple of Apollo and of the nearby Ploutonion was linked to the existence of the surface trace of a seismic fault, on which both sanctuaries were purposely built and which was revered as Gateway of Hades. The Ploutonion was the oldest religious centre of the native community, the place where Apollo met with Cibele. It was said that only the priest of the Great Mother could enter the cave without being overpowered by the noxious underground fumes. Temples dedicated to Apollo were often built over geologically active sites, including his most famous, the temple at Delphi.

When the Christian faith was granted official primacy in the 4th century, this temple underwent a number of desecrations. Part of the peribolos was also dismantled to make room for a large Nympheum.

=== Ploutonion ===
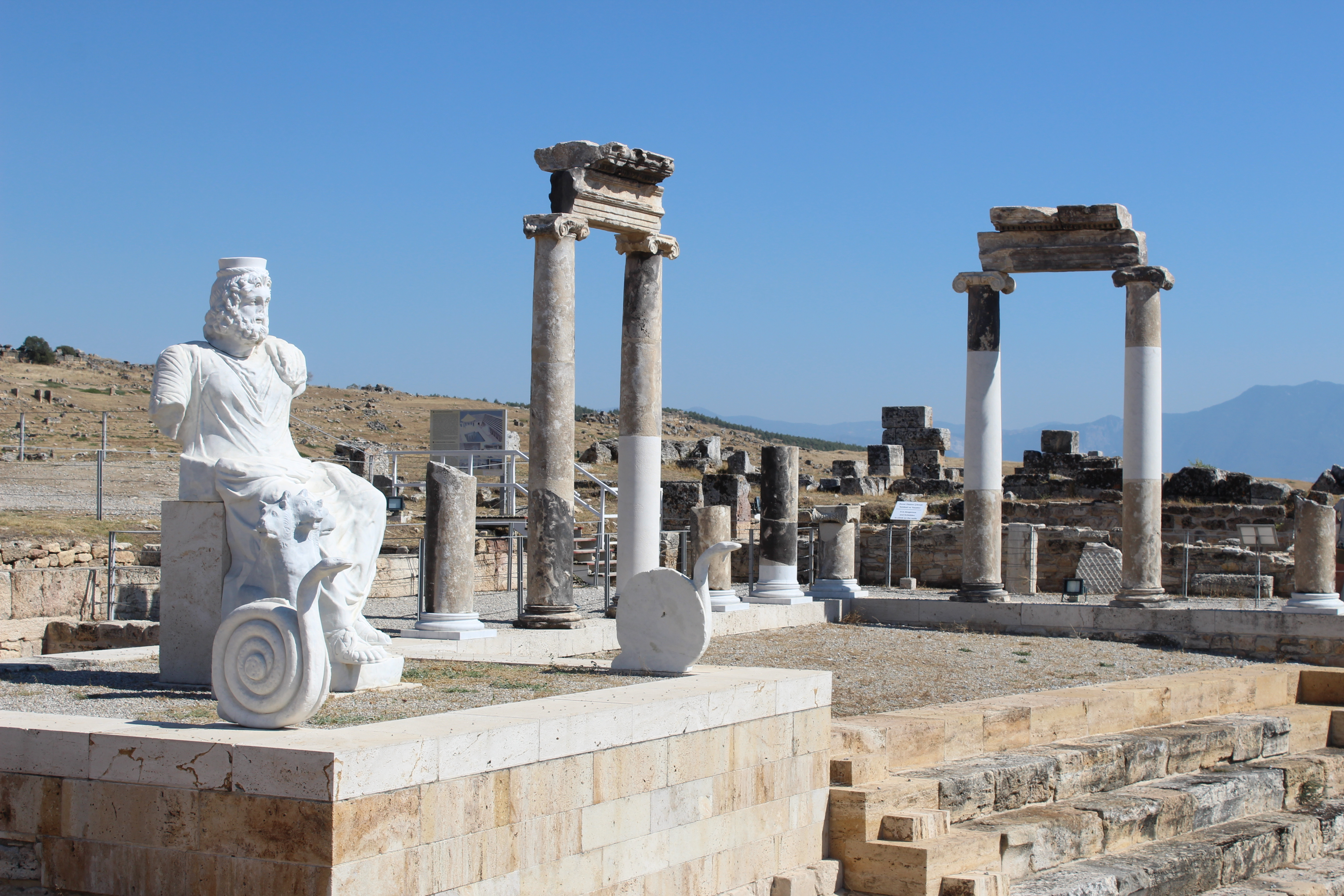
Ploutonion

At least two structures are identified as the "Ploutonion" at the ancient site of Hierapolis. One is located adjacent to the Temple of Apollo (identified as the Plutonium in the 60s), the second one is located some 200 meters to the east which has been identified as "the Plutonium" mentioned in the historic sources. The second one, conventionally called the "New Plutonium" also bears an inscription mentioned by the ancient authors.

Next to the Apollo temple and within its sacred area is the oldest local sanctuary, Pluto's Gate, a ploutonion (Ancient Greek: Πλουτώνειον) or plutonium, which here means a shrine to the Greek god Pluto. This plutonion was described by several ancient writers, including Strabo, Cassius Dio, and Damascius. It is a small cave just large enough for one person to enter through a fenced entrance, beyond which stairs go down and from which emerges suffocating carbon dioxide gas caused by subterranean geologic activity. Behind the 3 square metres (32 sq ft) roofed chamber is a deep cleft in the rock, through which fast-flowing hot water passes while releasing a sharp-smelling gas.

During the early years of the town, castrated priests of Cybele descended into the plutonion, crawling over the floor to pockets of oxygen or holding their breath. Carbon dioxide is heavier than air and so tends to settle in hollows. The priests would then come up to show that they were miraculously immune to the gas and infused with divine protection.

An enclosed area of 2,000 square metres (22,000 sq ft) stood in front of the entrance. It was covered by a thick layer of suffocating gas, killing anyone who dared to enter it. The priests sold birds and other animals to the visitors, so that they could try out how deadly this enclosed area was. Visitors could (for a fee) ask questions of Pluto's oracle. This provided a considerable source of income for the temple. The entrance to the plutonion was walled off during the Christian times and has just been recently unearthed.

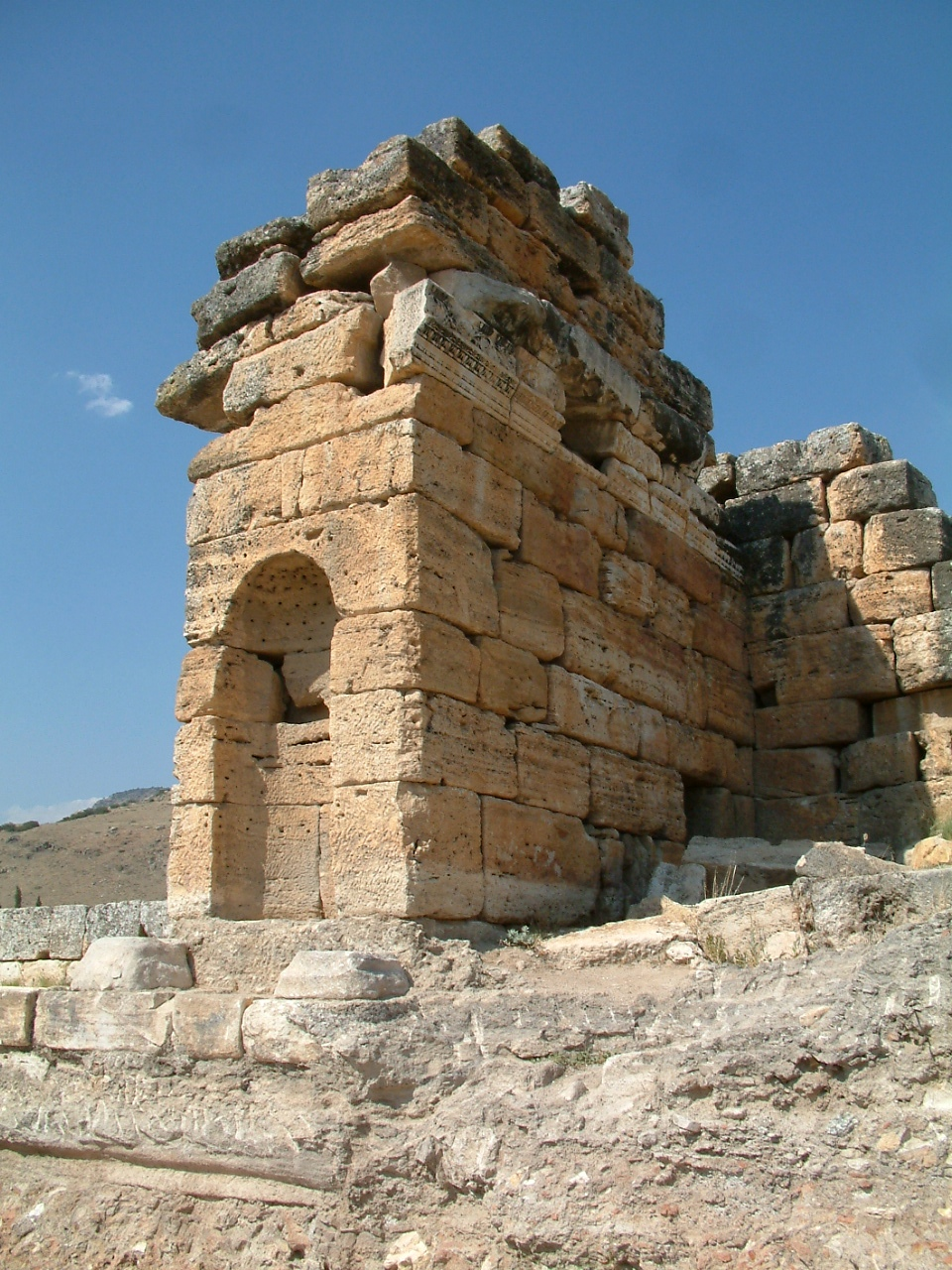
The Nymphaeum

=== Nymphaeum ===
The Nymphaeum is located inside the sacred area in front of the Apollo temple. It dates from the 2nd century AD. It was a shrine of the nymphs, a monumental fountain distributing water to the houses of the city via an ingenious network of pipes. The Nymphaeum was repaired in the 5th century during the Byzantine era. A retaining wall was built with elements from the peribolos of the Apollonian temple. By doing so, the early Christians cut off the view of the pagan temple. The Byzantine gate was constructed in the 6th century. Now only the back wall and the two side walls remain. The walls and the niches in the walls were decorated with statues. The Italian archaeological team has excavated two statues of priestesses, which are now on display at the local museum.

The Nymphaeum has a U-shaped plan and sits on the continuation of the main colonnaded road. The stone pavement columns and other architectural remains mark a great part of the colonnaded road which ran through the city in a north–south direction. It has statues and shops around it, underneath which passed canals. The road had a base covered with stone blocks, now under the pool of the Private Administration. There are two huge doors which were constructed at the end of the 1st century AD and left outside the city walls.

=== Necropolis ===
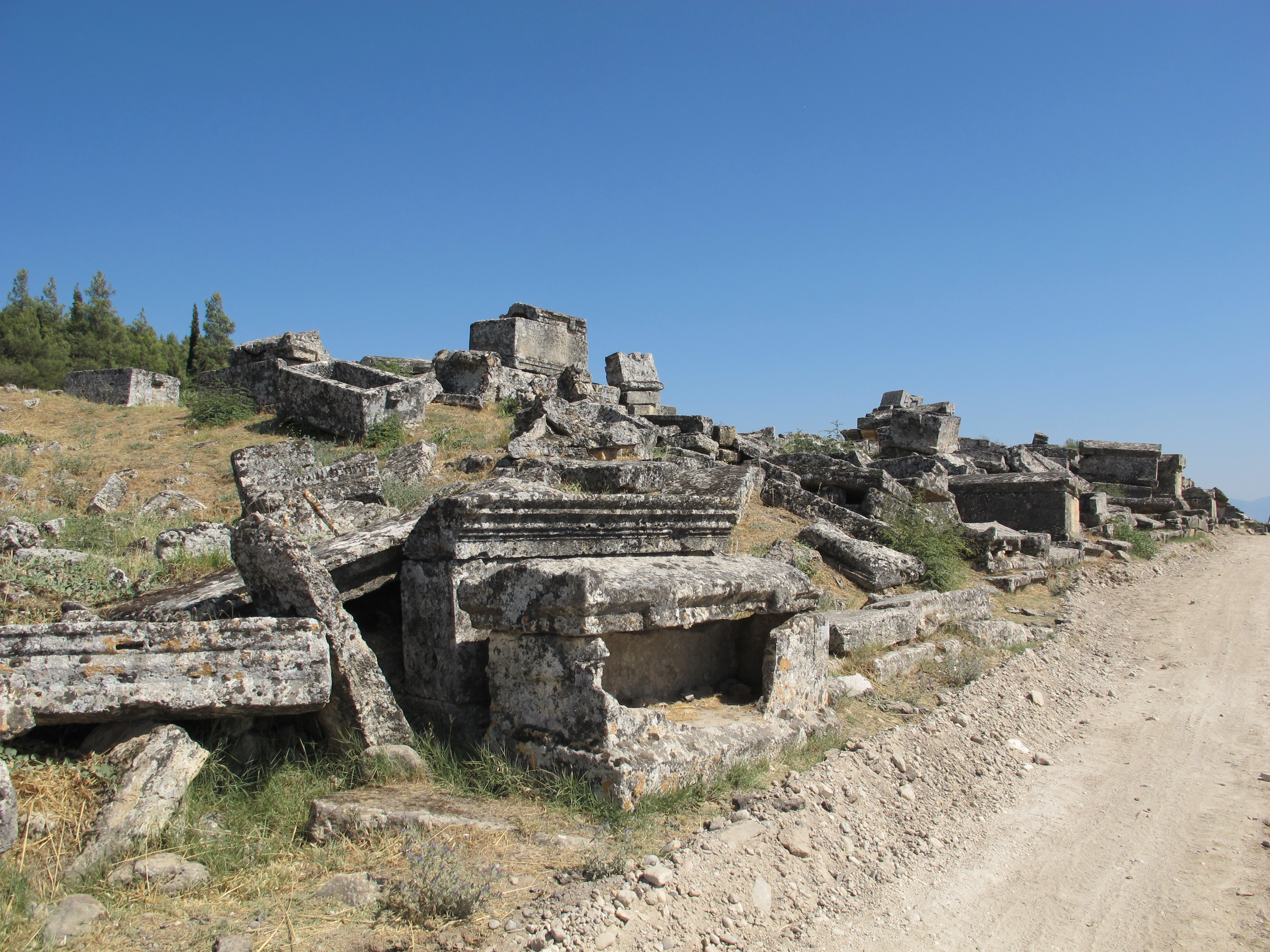
The Necropolis

Beyond the city walls and meadow, following the main colonnaded road and passing the outer baths (thermae extra muros), an extensive necropolis extends for over 2 kilometres (1.2 mi) on both sides of the old road to Phrygian Tripolis and Sardis. The other goes south from Laodicea to Closae. The necropolis extends from the northern to the eastern and southern sections of the old city. Most of the tombs have been excavated.

This necropolis is one of the best preserved in Turkey. Most of the about 1,200 tombs were constructed with local varieties of limestone, though marble has been used, as well. Most tombs date from the late Hellenic period, but there are also a considerable number from the Roman and early Christian periods. People who came for medical treatment to Hierapolis in ancient times and the native people of the city buried their dead in tombs of several types according to their traditions and socio-economic status.

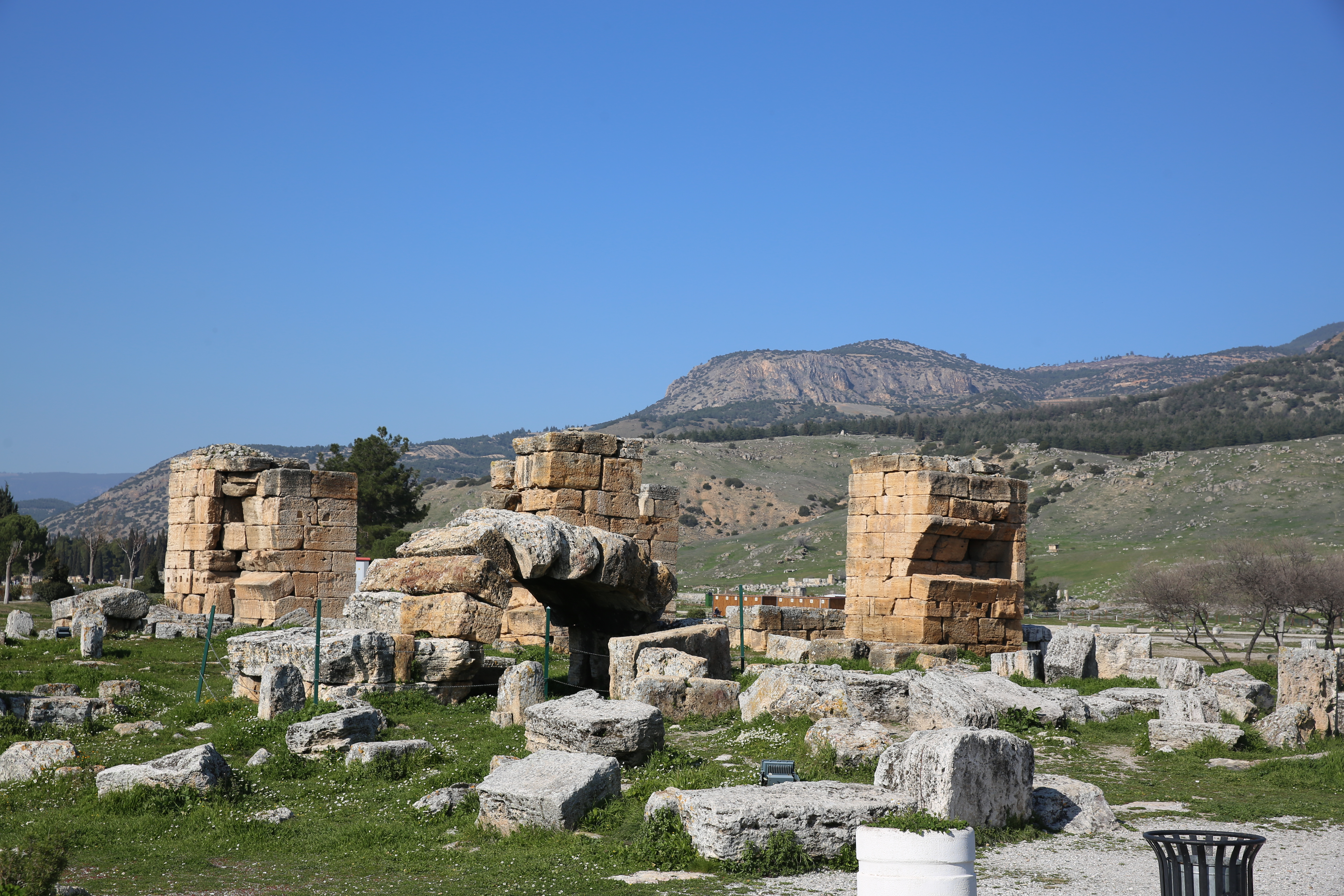

The tombs and funeral monuments can be divided into four types:

1. Simple graves for common people
2. Sarcophagi, some raised on a substructure and others hollowed out from the rock. Many are covered with a double-pitched roof. Most are constructed in marble and are decorated with reliefs and epitaphs showing the names and professions of the deceased and extolling their good deeds. These epitaphs have revealed much about the population. Most, however, have been plundered over the years.
3. Circular tumuli, sometimes hard to discern. These mounds each have a narrow passageway leading to a vaulted chamber inside.
4. Larger family graves, sometimes monumental and resembling small temples.

==== Northern Necropolis ====
The monuments are situated in the large area, together with many travertine lahids, inscribed with Soros suffixes written in Greek (some over 2,000 years old) generally in the epigraphs on lahids.

There are many architectural grave monuments in Hierapolis and they show different architectural techniques. The oldest graves are of the Hellenistic Period (1st and 2nd centuries BC), and are Tumulus graves, which are located on the east side of the foothill. The stone is cut properly limited to the drum cylinder which bonds the top of the burial chamber. The grave room is accessible from the corridor dramos.

These tombs belonged to rich families. Poor families' tombs were carved into the rock and are simple. On the north side of the city, the graves made as the 2nd and the 3rd, are generally surrounded by walls and they have gardens decorated with flowers and trees (especially cypress). Grave monuments which are completely made of travertine, show different types; like simple lahids, and home kind graves which has two or more lahids on it. On the sarcophagus that holds the lahid, there is an inscription written in Greek (bomas, "altar"). "Bomas" was used as symbol which stresses that with the connection of a dead body of a person in high position, his or her remembrance will be exalted. These monuments have the same functions with heroon. (The grave monuments made for celebrating are for the heroes' and important persons' who are believed to become gods after they die.)

Scheme of the water-driven Roman sawmill, depicted on the Sarcophagus of Marcus Aurelius Ammianos on the north necropolis. The 3rd century mill is the earliest known machine to incorporate a crank and connecting rod mechanism.

===== Sawmill =====
A raised relief on the Sarcophagus of a certain Marcus Aurelius Ammianos, a local miller, depicts the earliest known machine to incorporate a crank and connecting rod. On the pediment a waterwheel fed by a mill race is shown powering via a gear train two frame saws cutting rectangular blocks by the way of connecting rods and, through mechanical necessity, cranks (see diagram). The accompanying inscription is in Greek.

In June 2014 the sarcophagus was stored at the Hierapolis Museum and not displayed.

==== Southern Necropolis ====
On the right side, fascinating signs of the earthquake can be seen. Large travertine area is completely demolished. The rectangle and hallow graves, which may be simpler and older than the necropolis, attracts attention. While digging, experts in Denizli Museum, found a grave with long inscriptions. Close to it, Epigraphic marble blocks had been founded which are dated to the Early Hellenistic Period. On the North side of the area, digging works are going on. On the hillside, Byzantine ramparts, on the grave builds, marble lahids had been founded. This lahids are staying on a stone base. The roof that built with cob brick is covered with tiles. This was a new style in this period, and inside the grave it is decorated with coloured wall paintings.

On the way to Laodikeia and Colossae is another grave related to the Necropolis. This is the grave of Tiberius Cladius Talamos, whose name was written in the long epigraph, and it attracts attention due to the resemblance of its facade to a home.

=== Martyrium ===
The martyrium of St. Philip stands on top of the hill outside the northeastern section of the city walls. It dates from the 5th century. It was said that Philip was buried in the center of the building and, though his tomb has recently been unearthed, the exact location has not yet been verified. The Martyrium burned down at the end of the 5th or early 6th century, as attested by fire marks on the columns. Philip is said to have been martyred in Hierapolis by being crucified upside-down or by being hung upside down by his ankles from a tree.

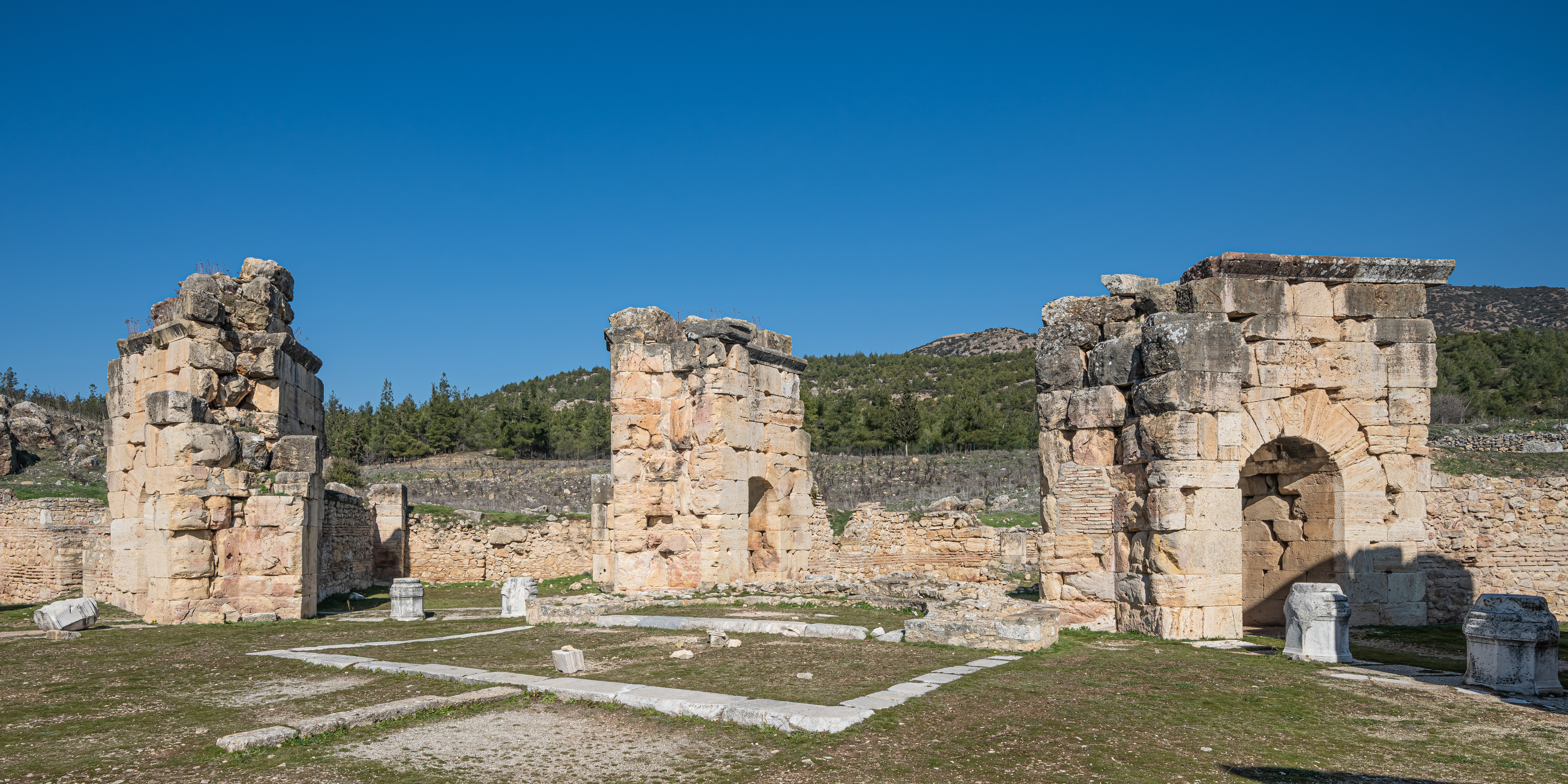
Martyrium

The martyrium is usually taken to have been named after the Christian apostle Philip, but from early times there has been some dispute as to the actual identity of "Philip of Hierapolis". This confusion started with a report by Polycrates of Ephesus in his Eusebius's Ecclesiastical History and in his controversial letter written to Victor of Rome towards the end of the 2nd century. In the letter, he reports that the graves of Philip "of the twelve apostles", and of his two aged virgin daughters were in (the Phrygian) Hierapolis; a third daughter, "who had lived in the Holy Ghost", was buried at Ephesus. With this may be compared the testimony of Clement of Alexandria, who incidentally speaks of "Philip the Apostle" as having begotten children and as having given daughters in marriage.

On the other hand, Proclus, one of the interlocutors in the "Dialogue of Caius", a writing of somewhat later date than the letter of Polycrates, mentions "four prophetesses, the daughters of Philip at Hierapolis in Asia, whose tomb and that of their father are to be seen there", where the mention of the daughters prophesying identifies the person meant with the Philip of Acts. Early traditions say this Philip was martyred by hanging in Phrygia. and was also known as "Philip the Apostle". The reasons for setting aside the evangelist identification, and for holding that the Philip who lived at Hierapolis was the Apostle are stated by Lightfoot, Colossians (2). Fresh confirmation of his view was afforded by the discovery of an inscription at Hierapolis, showing that the church there was dedicated to the memory "of the holy and glorious apostle and theologian Philip."Early traditions say this Philip was martyred by hanging in Phrygia. and was also known as "Philip the Apostle".

The martyrium had a special design, probably executed by an architect of a Byzantine emperor. It has a central octagonal structure with a diameter of 20 metres (66 ft) under a wooden dome which is covered with lead tiles. This is surrounded with eight rectangular rooms, each accessible via three arches. Four were used as entrances to the church, the other four as chapels. The space between the eight rooms was filled with heptagonal chapels with a triangular apse. The dome above the apse was decorated with mosaics. The whole structure was surrounded by an arcade with marble columns. All the walls were covered with marble panels.

In 2011, it was announced that Philip's gravesite may have been discovered about 40 metres (130 ft) from the martyrium.

=== The Great Baths ===
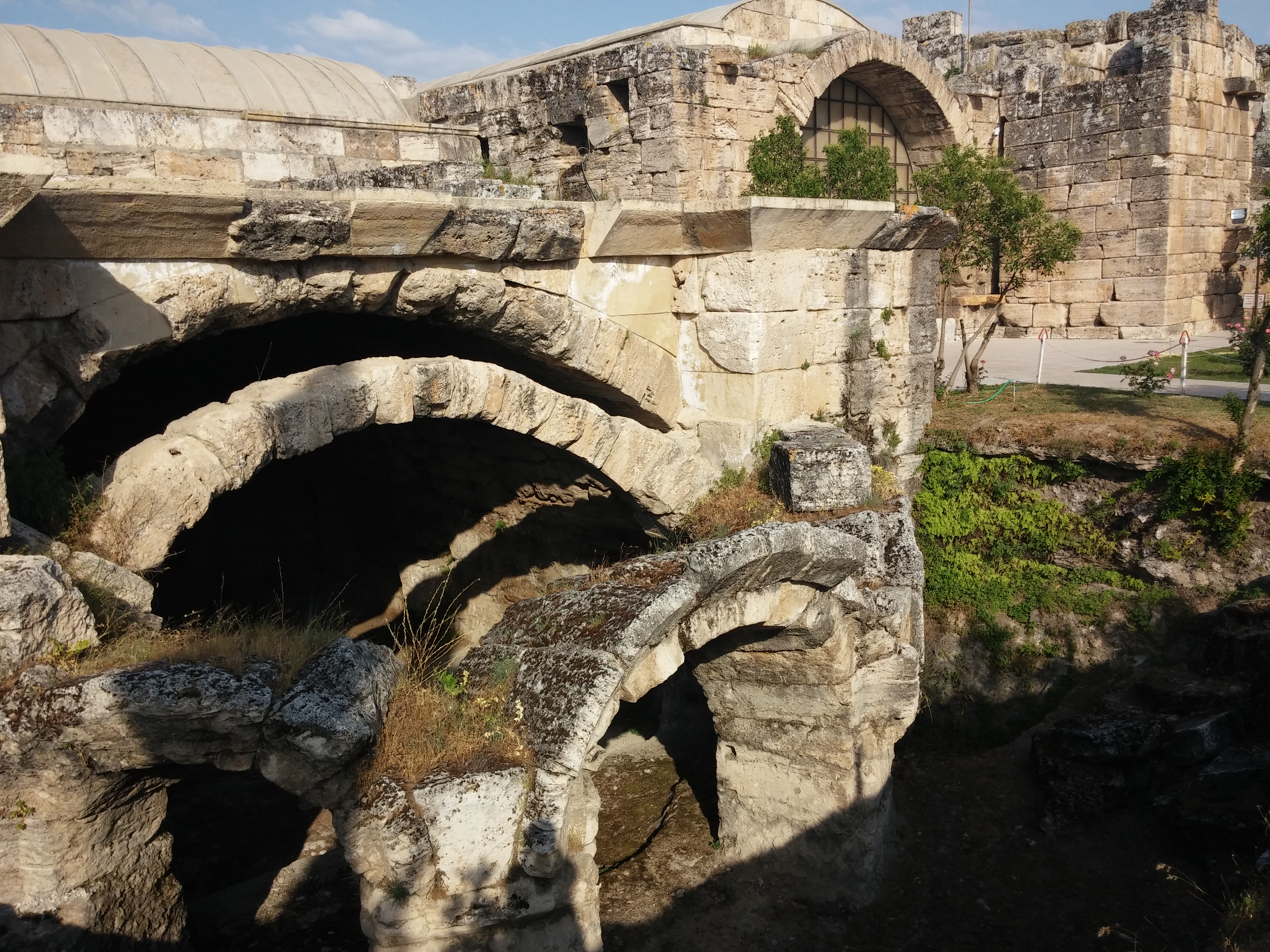
The Roman Baths, now the Archaeology Museum

The great baths were centred upon the natural thermal pools and were one of the biggest buildings of Hierapolis.

==== Antique Pool ====
Especially in the period of the Roman Empire, Hierapolis and its site were a health centre. In those years, thousands of people used to come to the baths, of which there are more than fifteen, and they found their remedy in those baths. Today's Antique Pool was shaped by the earthquake which happened in the 7th century AD. The marble portico with Ionic arrangement fell into the spring during that earthquake.

==== Cleopatra's Pool ====
The water in the thermal pool is 36–57 °C, pH value is 5.8 and radon value is 1480 pCi/L. The spa water contains bicarbonate, sulphate and carbon dioxide, as well as iron and radioactive combination. The water in this spring is suitable for taking showers and drinking cures, 2430 MG/liter melt metal value.

=== The Basilica Baths ===
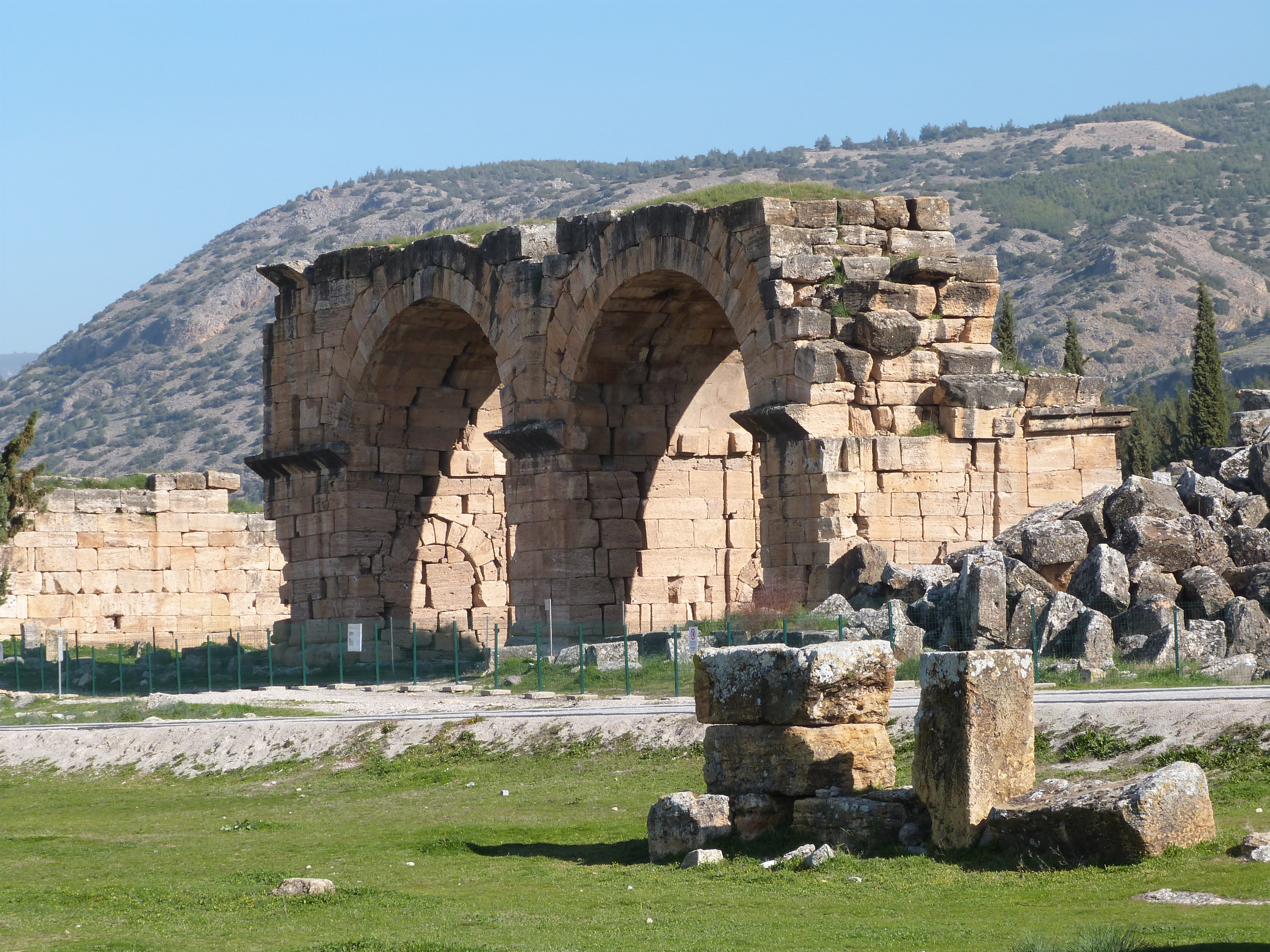
Basilica baths

This set of baths was constructed outside the north gate at the beginning of the 3rd century AD. It was converted into a church in the early Christian era (c. 5th century). It is apparent that the building had stuccoed, vaulted ceilings and that the halls were decorated with marble slabs.

== Museum ==
The Archaeology Museum has been located in the great baths since 1984. The museum also includes artifacts from Laodiceia, Colossae, Tripolis, Attuda, and other towns of the Lycus (Çürüksu) valley. In addition to these, the museum has a large section devoted to artifacts found at Beycesultan Hüyük and which includes some of the most beautiful examples of Bronze Age craft.

Artifacts which have come from the Caria, Pisidia and Lydia regions are also on display in this museum. The museum's exhibition space consists of three closed areas of the Hierapolis Bath and open areas in the eastern side, which are known to have been used as the library and the gymnasium. The artifacts in the open exhibition space are mostly marble and stone.

=== Tombs and Statues Gallery ===
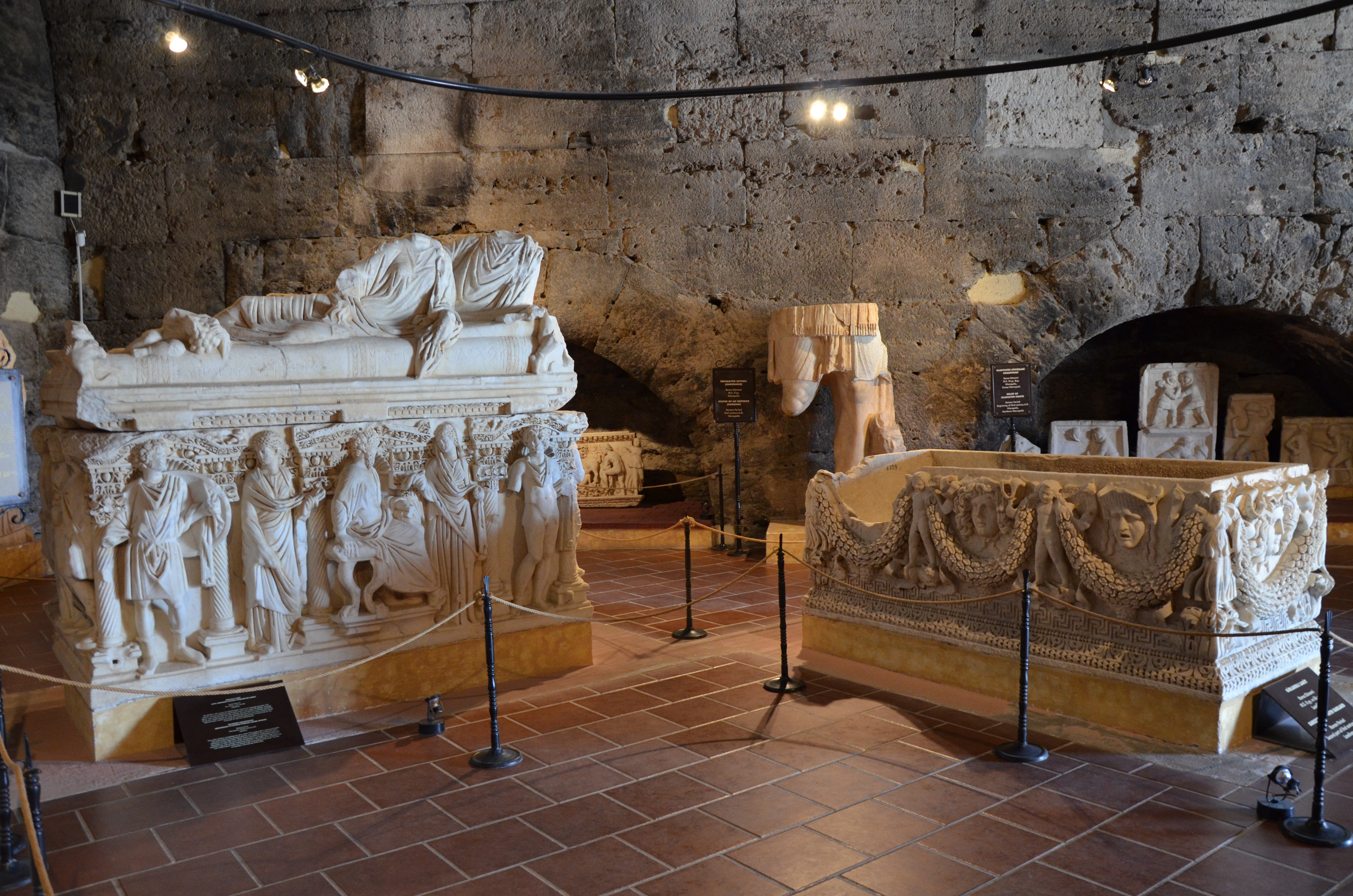
Sarcophagi in the Museum

This room contains finds from the excavations in Hierapolis and Laodiceia, including sarcophagi, statues, gravestones, pedestals, pillars and inscriptions. Among these artifacts there are statues of Tyche, Dionysus, Pan, Asklepios, Isis, Demeter and Trion which, although executed by the Romans, were inspired by the Hellenistic tradition. The representations of local customs on family tombs are particularly interesting.

The most beautiful examples of baked earth sarcophagi are specific to this area. One of the most valuable works of art in this room is the sarcophagus belonging to a certain Arhom, of the 'Sidemare' type. On it is an inscription to Maximilian, and it is the finest work to emerge from the ancient towns of Lahdi and Laodicia.

=== Small Artifacts Gallery ===
In this room, there are small findings from several civilizations of the last 4,000 years. These works, which are displayed in chronological order include works from many archaeological sites in and around Denizli. A special importance is given to the findings from Beycesultan Höyük. These discoveries are an example of an ancient civilization. These works, which were found in the excavation conducted by the British Institute of Archaeology include idols, baked earth bowls, libation cups, seals and other stone artifacts. In other parts of the room are displayed objects from the Frigan, Hellenistic, Roman and Byzantine period such as glass cups, necklaces, gemstones (in the form of rings, bracelets, earrings and so on) and earthenware lamps. This room also contains an important sequence of ancient coins arranged in chronological order. The earliest of these coins were minted in the 6th century AD and the display proceeds through the Hellenistic, Roman, Byzantine, Selçuk and Ottoman periods with coins of gold, silver and bronze.

=== Theatre Gallery ===
In this room, decorative works from the theatre of Hierapolis, most of which have been restored, are displayed. Some of the reliefs of the scenery building remain in site but parts of them have been replaced by copies. In the works that are found in the room there are reliefs devoted to the myth of Apollo and Artemis, the delights of Dionysos and the coronation of the Roman Emperor Septimius Severus. There are depictions of the abduction of Persephone by Hades, Apollo, Leto, Artemis, and Hades and sculpted sphinxes. Sculpted relief reminiscent of Attalus and Eumenes are on display. Inscriptions describing the coronation of the goddess Hierapolis and decisions of the assembly concerning the theater may be seen.

== Notable residents ==
- Epictetus
- Philip the Apostle

== See also ==
- Hierapolis in Isauria
