= Attuda =

Hellenistic city in ancient Caria

Coordinates: 37°50′14″N 28°48′44″E

Attuda or Attouda (Ancient Greek: Ἄττουδα) was a Hellenistic city in ancient Caria and later in the Roman province of Phrygia Pacatiana. There are coins of the place with the Greek epigraph Ἱερὰ Βουλὴ Ἀττουδέων, of the time of Augustus and later. The coins show that the Men Carus was worshipped there.

Its site was at present-day Hisarköy, Sarayköy District, Denizli Province, Turkey.

== Bishopric ==
It became a Christian bishopric, a suffragan at first of the metropolitan see of Laodicea in Phrygia, but later, after the division of the Roman province, of the see of Hierapolis.

The names of five of its bishops are recorded in extant documents. Hermelaus or Hermolaus was at the Council of Ephesus in 431. At the Council of Chalcedon in 451, Metropolitan Nunechius of Laodicea signed on behalf of Symmachus of Attuda. Stephanus was at the Trullan Council of 692. Nicetas and Arsenius, presumably of the rival parties of Patriarch Photius I and Patriarch Ignatius of Constantinople, were at the Council of Constantinople (879).

No longer a residential bishopric, Attuda is today listed by the Catholic Church as a titular see.
