= Topçambaba Mountain =

Mountain in Turkey

Coordinates: 37.633°N 28.200°E

Madran Mountain (off and on, Madran Baba Dagh) is a mountain in Aydın Province, Turkey.

Cadmus or Cadmos (Ancient Greek: Κάδμος) was the ancient Greek name; it was then in Phrygia Magna. In antiquity, the sides were well wooded. A river Cadmus flowed from the mountain that flowed into the Lycus, a tributary of the Maeander. The range of Cadmus formed the southern boundary of the basin of the Maeander in these parts. Pliny's remark about it does not help us. Ptolemy puts it in the latitude of Mycale, which is tolerably correct.
