= Lycus (river of Phrygia) =

River in ancient Phrygia

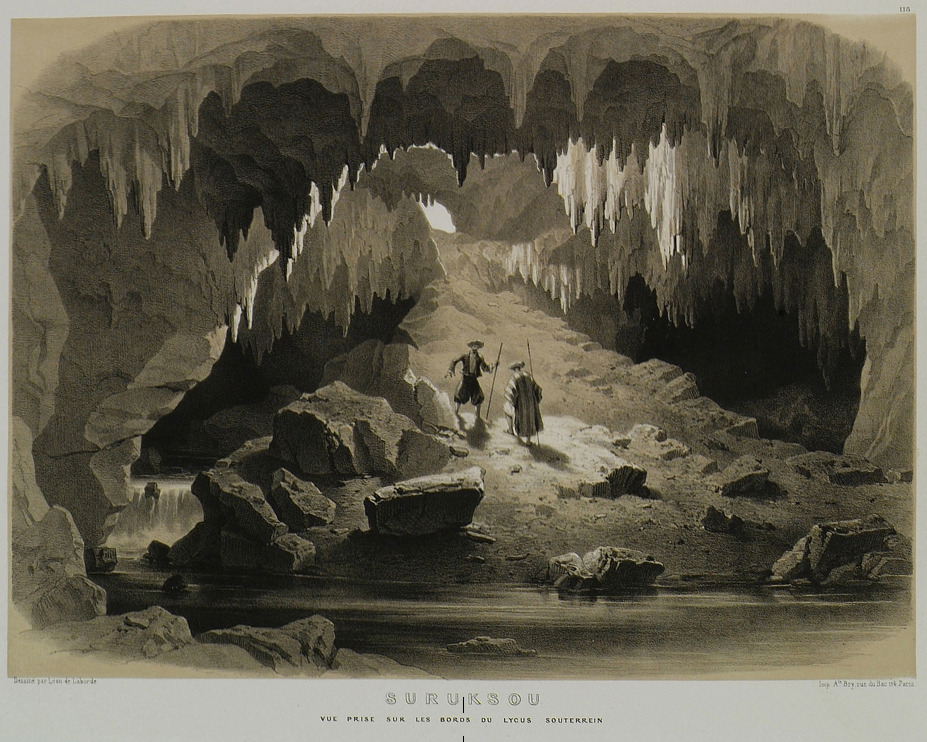
- Native name: Λύκος (Greek)

Physical characteristics
- Source
  - coordinates: 37°48′52″N 29°11′38″E
- Mouth: Büyük Menderes River
  - coordinates: 37°57′17″N 28°56′53″E
  - elevation: 133 m (436 ft)

Lycus or Lykos (Ancient Greek: Λύκος; Turkish: Çürüksu) is the former name of a river in ancient Phrygia now known as Çürüksu. It is a tributary of the Maeander and joins it a few kilometers south of Tripolis. It had its sources in the eastern parts of Mount Cadmus (Strabo xii. p. 578), not far from those of the Meander itself, and it flowed westerly towards Colossae. Near there, it disappeared into a chasm of the earth. After a distance of five stadia, however, its waters reappeared. After flowing by Laodicea ad Lycum, it discharged into the Maeander. (Herod. vii. 30; Plin. v. 29; Ptol. v. 2. § 8; Hamilton, Researches, vol. i. p. 508, &c., and Journal of the Royal Geogr. Soc. vii. p. 60.)
