= Hanabad =

Hanabad may refer to:

- Çardak, Turkey
- Henabad (disambiguation), Iran
