= Çığrı, Başmakçı =

Çığrı
- Village
- Location within Turkey Location within Turkey Aegean
- Coordinates: 37°48′59″N 30°3′12″E
- Country: Turkey
- Province: Afyonkarahisar
- District: Başmakçı
- Population (2021): 614
- Time zone: UTC+3 (TRT)

Çığrı is a village in the Başmakçı District, Afyonkarahisar Province, Turkey. Its population is 614 (2021). It is located southwest of Ovacık and southeast of Yassıören.
