= Söğüt (disambiguation) =

Söğüt is a district of Bilecik Province, Turkey.

Söğüt (literally "willow" in Turkish) may also refer to:

- Söğüt, Burdur, a town in Çavdır district of Burdur Province, Turkey
- Söğüt, Çardak
- Söğüt Dam, a dam in Kütahya Province, Turkey

== See also ==
- Söğütlü, a district of Sakarya Province, Turkey
- Söğütlüçeşme, a railway station in Istanbul, Turkey
