= Akkeçili, Başmakçı =

Akkeçili
- Village
- Location within Turkey Location within Turkey Aegean
- Coordinates: 37°55′58″N 29°57′9″E
- Country: Turkey
- Province: Afyonkarahisar
- District: Başmakçı
- Population (2021): 614
- Time zone: UTC+3 (TRT)

Akkeçili is a village in the Başmakçı District, Afyonkarahisar Province, Turkey. Its population is 614 (2021). It lies roughly halfway between the district capital of Başmakçı to the southeast and Dazkırı to the southwest.
