= Yaka, Başmakçı =

Yaka
- Village
- Location within Turkey Location within Turkey Aegean
- Coordinates: 37°52′02″N 30°02′46″E
- Country: Turkey
- Province: Afyonkarahisar
- District: Başmakçı
- Population (2021): 592
- Time zone: UTC+3 (TRT)

Yaka is a large village in the Başmakçı District, Afyonkarahisar Province, Turkey. Its population is 592 (2021). It is located southeast by road from the district capital of Başmakçı, on the way to Ovacık. Before the 2013 reorganisation, it was a town (belde).
