= Çaltı, Çardak =

Village in Turkey

Çaltı
- Neighbourhood
- Location in Turkey Çaltı (Turkey Aegean)
- Coordinates: 37.7471°N 29.7237°E
- Country: Turkey
- Province: Denizli
- District: Çardak
- Population (2022): 422
- Time zone: UTC+3 (TRT)

Çaltı is a neighbourhood in the municipality and district of Çardak, Denizli Province in Turkey. Its population is 422 (2022).
