= Oğuz, Buldan =

Village in Turkey

Oğuz
- Neighbourhood
- Country: Turkey
- Province: Denizli
- District: Buldan
- Population (2022): 527
- Time zone: UTC+3 (TRT)

Oğuz (also: Oğuzköy) is a neighbourhood in the municipality and district of Buldan, Denizli Province in Turkey. Its population is 527 (2022).
