= Yassıören, Başmakçı =

Yassıören
- Village
- Location within Turkey Location within Turkey Aegean
- Coordinates: 37°51′5″N 30°1′9″E
- Country: Turkey
- Province: Afyonkarahisar
- District: Başmakçı
- Population (2021): 335
- Time zone: UTC+3 (TRT)

Yassıören is a village in the Başmakçı District, Afyonkarahisar Province, Turkey. Its population is 335 (2021). It is located south of the district capital of Başmakçı and northeast of Akpınar, near Lake Acıgöl.
