= Alandız, Buldan =

Village in Turkey

Alandız
- Neighbourhood
- Location in Turkey Alandız (Turkey Aegean)
- Coordinates: 38°05′N 28°40′E
- Country: Turkey
- Province: Denizli
- District: Buldan
- Population (2022): 380
- Time zone: UTC+3 (TRT)

Alandız is a neighbourhood in the municipality and district of Buldan, Denizli Province in Turkey. Its population is 380 (2022).
