= Alacaoğlu, Buldan =

Village in Turkey

Alacaoğlu
- Neighbourhood
- Location in Turkey Alacaoğlu (Turkey Aegean)
- Coordinates: 38.1182°N 28.8525°E
- Country: Turkey
- Province: Denizli
- District: Buldan
- Population (2022): 176
- Time zone: UTC+3 (TRT)

Alacaoğlu is a neighbourhood in the municipality and district of Buldan, Denizli Province in Turkey. Its population is 176 (2022).
