= Küllüce =

Küllüce can refer to:

- Küllüce, Başmakçı
- Küllüce, Tercan
