= Bölmekaya, Buldan =

Village in Turkey

Bölmekaya
- Neighbourhood
- Location in Turkey Bölmekaya (Turkey Aegean)
- Coordinates: 38°01′N 28°53′E
- Country: Turkey
- Province: Denizli
- District: Buldan
- Population (2022): 313
- Time zone: UTC+3 (TRT)

Bölmekaya is a neighbourhood in the municipality and district of Buldan, Denizli Province in Turkey. Its population is 313 (2022).
