= Ayvaz =

Ayvaz is both a masculine Turkish given name and a Turkish surname. Notable people with the name include:

- Ayvaz Gökdemir (1942–2008), Turkish politician
- Kazım Ayvaz (1938–2020), Turkish sport wrestler

== See also ==
- Ayvaz, Çardak
