= Hasanbeyler, Buldan =

Village in Turkey

Hasanbeyler
- Neighbourhood
- Country: Turkey
- Province: Denizli
- District: Buldan
- Population (2022): 412
- Time zone: UTC+3 (TRT)
- Postal code: 20400
- Area code: (+90) 258

Hasanbeyler is a neighbourhood in the municipality and district of Buldan, Denizli Province in Turkey. Its population is 412 (2022).
