= Türlübey, Buldan =

Village in Turkey

Türlübey
- Neighbourhood
- Location in Turkey Türlübey (Turkey Aegean)
- Coordinates: 38°09′N 28°54′E
- Country: Turkey
- Province: Denizli
- District: Buldan
- Population (2022): 583
- Time zone: UTC+3 (TRT)

Türlübey is a neighbourhood in the municipality and district of Buldan, Denizli Province in Turkey. Its population is 583 (2022).
