= Çatak, Buldan =

Village in Turkey

Çatak
- Neighbourhood
- Location in Turkey Çatak (Turkey Aegean)
- Coordinates: 38.0057°N 28.7708°E
- Country: Turkey
- Province: Denizli
- District: Buldan
- Population (2022): 78
- Time zone: UTC+3 (TRT)

Çatak is a neighbourhood in the municipality and district of Buldan, Denizli Province in Turkey. Its population is 78 (2022).
