= Doğan, Buldan =

Village in Turkey

Coordinates: 38.0411°N 28.8931°E

Doğan
- Neighbourhood
- Location in Turkey Doğan (Turkey Aegean)
- Coordinates
- Country: Turkey
- Province: Denizli
- District: Buldan
- Population (2022): 297
- Time zone: UTC+3 (TRT)

Doğan (also: Doğanköy) is a neighborhood in the municipality and district of Buldan, Denizli Province in Turkey. Its population is 297 (2022).
