= Yayla, Buldan =

Village in Turkey

Yayla
- Neighbourhood
- Country: Turkey
- Province: Denizli
- District: Buldan
- Population (2022): 251
- Time zone: UTC+3 (TRT)

Yayla is a neighbourhood in the municipality and district of Buldan, Denizli Province in Turkey. Its population is 251 (2022).
