= Yukarıyenice =

Yukarıyenice can refer to:

- Yukarıyenice, Dazkırı
- Yukarıyenice, Palandöken
