= Beyler, Buldan =

Village in Turkey

Beyler
- Neighbourhood
- Location in Turkey Beyler (Turkey Aegean)
- Coordinates: 38.1224°N 28.7622°E
- Country: Turkey
- Province: Denizli
- District: Buldan
- Population (2022): 147
- Time zone: UTC+3 (TRT)

Beyler is a neighbourhood in the municipality and district of Buldan, Denizli Province in Turkey. Its population is 147 (2022).
