= Akarca =

Akarca may refer to several places:

- Akarca, Dazkırı, a village in Dazkırı district of Afyonkarahisar Province, Turkey
- Akarca, Kozan, a village in Kozan district of Adana Province, Turkey
- Akarca, Mersin, a village in Mezitli district of Mersin Province, Turkey
- Akarca, Mustafakemalpaşa, a neighbourhood in the municipality and district of Mustafakemalpaşa, Bursa Province, Turkey
- Akarca, Şereflikoçhisar, a village in the Şereflikoçhisar district of Ankara Province, Turkey
