= Beylerli, Çardak =

Village in Turkey

Beylerli
- Neighbourhood
- Location in Turkey Beylerli (Turkey Aegean)
- Coordinates: 37.6985°N 29.6429°E
- Country: Turkey
- Province: Denizli
- District: Çardak
- Population (2022): 602
- Time zone: UTC+3 (TRT)

Beylerli is a neighbourhood of the municipality and district of Çardak, Denizli Province, Turkey. Its population is 602 (2022). Before the 2013 reorganisation, it was a town (belde).
