= Arıköy =

Arıköy can refer to:

- Arıköy, Dazkırı
- Arıköy, Dicle
- Arıköy, Silvan
