= Kadıköy, Buldan =

Village in Turkey

Kadıköy
- Neighbourhood
- Location in Turkey Kadıköy (Turkey Aegean)
- Coordinates: 38.1619°N 28.7591°E
- Country: Turkey
- Province: Denizli
- District: Buldan
- Population (2022): 980
- Time zone: UTC+3 (TRT)

Kadıköy is a neighbourhood in the municipality and district of Buldan, Denizli Province in Turkey. Its population is 980 (2022).
