= Beltarla, Başmakçı =

Beltarla
- Village
- Location within Turkey Location within Turkey Aegean
- Coordinates: 37°53′44″N 30°5′55″E
- Country: Turkey
- Province: Afyonkarahisar
- District: Başmakçı
- Population (2021): 370
- Time zone: UTC+3 (TRT)

Beltarla (also: Aşağı Beltarla) is a village in the Başmakçı District, Afyonkarahisar Province, Turkey. Its population is 370 (2021). It is located east of the district capital of Başmakçı.
