= Kovanoluk =

Kovanoluk can refer to:

- Kovanoluk, Buldan
- Kovanoluk, Samsat
