= Bostanyeri, Buldan =

Village in Turkey

Bostanyeri
- Neighbourhood
- Location in Turkey Bostanyeri (Turkey Aegean)
- Coordinates: 38.0195°N 28.8284°E
- Country: Turkey
- Province: Denizli
- District: Buldan
- Population (2022): 77
- Time zone: UTC+3 (TRT)

Bostanyeri is a neighbourhood in the municipality and district of Buldan, Denizli Province in Turkey. Its population is 77 (2022).
