= Bozalan, Buldan =

Village in Turkey

Bozalan
- Neighbourhood
- Location in Turkey Bozalan (Turkey Aegean)
- Coordinates: 38.0882°N 28.8679°E
- Country: Turkey
- Province: Denizli
- District: Buldan
- Population (2022): 347
- Time zone: UTC+3 (TRT)

Bozalan is a neighbourhood in the municipality and district of Buldan, Denizli Province in Turkey. Its population is 347 (2022).
