= Dımbazlar, Buldan =

Village in Turkey

Dımbazlar
- Neighbourhood
- Location in Turkey Dımbazlar (Turkey Aegean)
- Coordinates: 38°06′N 28°49′E
- Country: Turkey
- Province: Denizli
- District: Buldan
- Population (2022): 194
- Time zone: UTC+3 (TRT)

Dımbazlar is a neighbourhood in the municipality and district of Buldan, Denizli Province in Turkey. Its population is 194 (2022).
