= Gölcük =

Gölcük may refer to:

== Places in Turkey ==
- Gölcük, Acıpayam
- Gölcük, Aydın, a village in Aydın District, Aydın Province
- Gölcük, Bolu, a village in Bolu District, Bolu Province
- Gölcük, Çardak
- Gölcük, Dursunbey, a village
- Gölcük, Kestel
- Gölcük, İzmir, a town in Ödemiş district, İzmir Province
- Gölcük, Kocaeli, a district center in Kocaeli Province
- Gölcük, Kumluca, a village in Kumluca District, Antalya Province
- Gölcük, Mudurnu, a village in Mudumu District, Bolu Province

== Other uses ==
- Gölcük Barbaros Hayrettin Lisesi, a public high school in Gölcük, Kocaeli, Turkey
- Gölcük Naval Shipyard, a naval shipyard of the Turkish Navy
- Gölcük Naval Base, the main base of the Turkish Navy
