= Yeşildere =

Yeşildere (literally "green stream" in Turkish) may refer to the following places in Turkey:

- Yeşildere, Acıpayam
- Yeşildere, Amasya, a village in the district of Amasya, Amasya Province
- Yeşildere, Buldan
- Yeşildere, Çorum
- Yeşildere, Horasan
- Yeşildere, Karacabey
- Yeşildere, Karaman, a town in the district of Karaman, Karaman Province
- Yeşildere, Kovancılar
- Yeşildere, Kuyucak, a village in the district of Kuyucak, Aydın Province
