= Gemişli, Çardak =

Village in Turkey

Gemişli
- Neighbourhood
- Location in Turkey Gemişli (Turkey Aegean)
- Coordinates: 37°46′24″N 29°49′10″E
- Country: Turkey
- Province: Denizli
- District: Çardak
- Population (2022): 909
- Time zone: UTC+3 (TRT)

Gemişli is a neighbourhood of the municipality and district of Çardak, Denizli Province, Turkey. Its population is 909 (2022). It was part of the town (belde) Gemiş, which was merged into Çardak at the 2013 reorganisation.
