= Yukarıbeltarla, Başmakçı =

Yukarıbeltarla
- Village
- Location within Turkey Location within Turkey Aegean
- Coordinates: 37°51′23″N 30°7′22″E
- Country: Turkey
- Province: Afyonkarahisar
- District: Başmakçı
- Population (2021): 442
- Time zone: UTC+3 (TRT)

Yukarıbeltarla is a village in the Başmakçı District, Afyonkarahisar Province, Turkey. Its population is 442 (2021). It lies just to the northeast of Ovacık.
