= Sarımahmutlu, Buldan =

Village in Turkey

Sarımahmutlu
- Neighbourhood
- Location in Turkey Sarımahmutlu (Turkey Aegean)
- Coordinates: 38°10′N 28°48′E
- Country: Turkey
- Province: Denizli
- District: Buldan
- Population (2022): 252
- Time zone: UTC+3 (TRT)

Sarımahmutlu is a neighbourhood in the municipality and district of Buldan, Denizli Province in Turkey. Its population is 252 (2022).
