= Aktaş, Buldan =

Village in Turkey

Aktaş
- Neighbourhood
- Location in Turkey Aktaş (Turkey Aegean)
- Coordinates: 38.0195°N 28.7460°E
- Country: Turkey
- Province: Denizli
- District: Buldan
- Population (2022): 121
- Time zone: UTC+3 (TRT)

Aktaş is a neighbourhood in the municipality and district of Buldan, Denizli Province in Turkey. Its population is 121 (2022).
