= Anaua =

Town of ancient Phrygia

Coordinates: 37°53′21″N 29°48′34″E

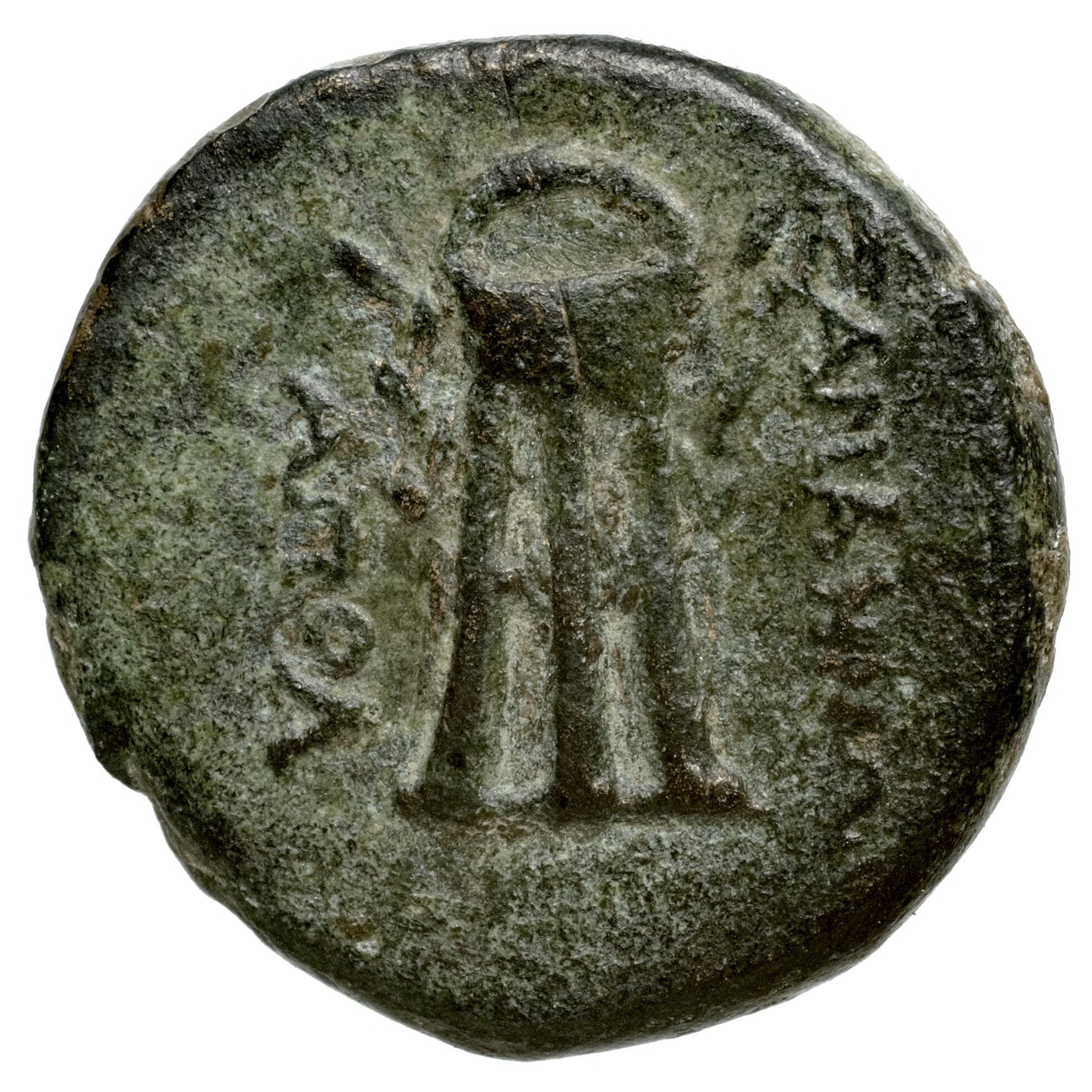
coin from Sanaos

Anaua (Ancient Greek: Ἄναυα) was a town of ancient Phrygia, later also known as Sanaos. It was located near a salt lake by the same name, now Lake Acıgöl. The town is located near modern Sarıkavak.
