= Hayriye =

Hayriye can refer to:

- Hayriye, Çardak
- Hayriye, İnegöl
- Hayriye, Söğüt
- Hayriye Melek Hunç (1896-1963) Turkish woman author of the Circassians descent
- Hayriye Ayşe Nermin Neftçi (1924-2003), Turkish politician
