= Çevlik =

Çevlik is a Turkish place name and may refer to the following places in Turkey:

- Çevlik, Karaisalı, a village in Karaisalı district of Adana Province
- Çevlik, Başmakçı, a village in Başmakçı district of Afyonkarahisar Province
- Çevlik, Mezitli, a village in Mezitli district of Mersin Province
- Çevlik, Samandağ, a midtown in Samandağ district of Hatay Province.
