= Boğazçiftlik, Buldan =

Village in Turkey

Boğazçiftlik
- Neighbourhood
- Location in Turkey Boğazçiftlik (Turkey Aegean)
- Coordinates: 38°12′N 28°51′E
- Country: Turkey
- Province: Denizli
- District: Buldan
- Population (2022): 211
- Time zone: UTC+3 (TRT)

Boğazçiftlik is a neighbourhood in the municipality and district of Buldan, Denizli Province in Turkey. Its population is 211 (2022).
