= Hisaralan =

Hisaralan can refer to the following villages in Turkey:

- Hisaralan, Dazkırı
- Hisaralan, Ezine
- Hisaralan, Sındırgı
