= Ekinlik =

Ekinlik can refer to the following villages in Turkey:

- Ekinlik, Başmakçı
- Ekinlik, Olur
- Ekinlik, Susurluk
