= Denizli Çardak Airport =

Denizli Çardak Airport Denizli Çardak Havalimanı
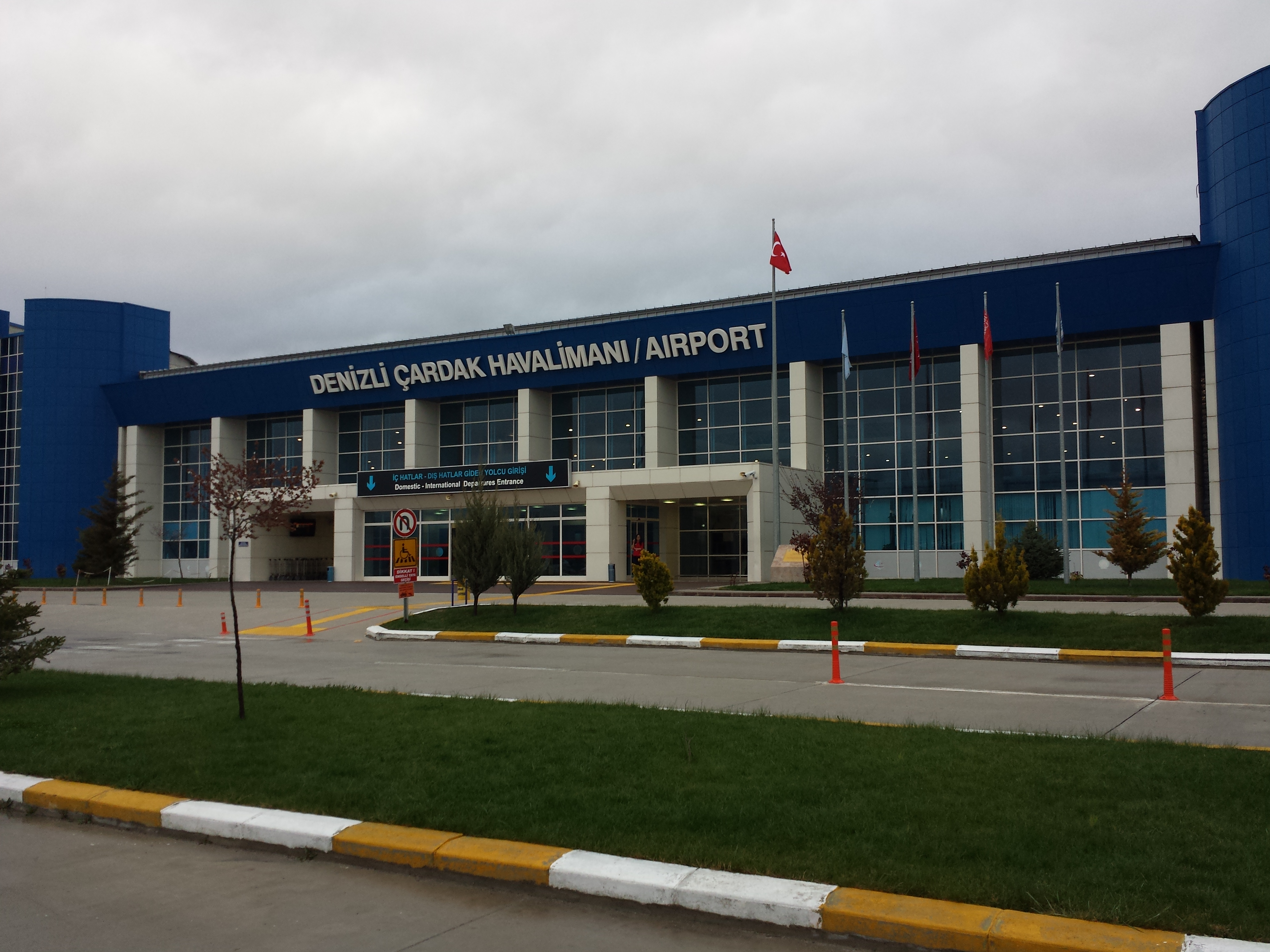
- IATA: DNZ; ICAO: LTAY

Summary
- Airport type: Public / military
- Serves: Denizli, Turkey
- Location: Çardak, Denizli, Turkey
- Opened: 11 February 1991; 35 years ago
- Elevation AMSL: 2,795 ft (852 m)
- Coordinates: 37°47′08″N 029°42′04″E
- Website: www.dhmi.gov.tr

Map
- Location of airport in Turkey DNZ (Europe)

Runways
Direction	Length		Surface
Direction	m	ft	Surface
05/23	3,000	9,842	Asphalt

Statistics (2025)
- Annual passenger capacity: 2,500,000
- Passengers: 459,061
- Passenger change 2024–25: ▲1%
- Aircraft movements: 7,048
- Movements change 2024–25: ▲14%

Denizli Çardak Airport (IATA: DNZ, ICAO: LTAY) is an airport located in Çardak, Denizli Province, Turkey. It is the airport serving the Aegan city of Denizli. The airport is operated by the General Directorate of State Airports, as is the case with many other airports in Turkey.

== Airlines and destinations ==
The following airlines operate regular scheduled and charter flights at Denizli Airport:

Airlines	Destinations
AJet	Istanbul–Sabiha Gökçen
Pegasus Airlines	Istanbul–Sabiha Gökçen
Turkish Airlines	Istanbul

== Traffic Statistics ==
Denizli–Çardak Airport passenger traffic statistics
Year (months)	Domestic	% change	International	% change	Total	% change
2025	427,722	▲6%	31,339	▼35%	459,061	▲1%
2024	405,063	▲4%	48,099	▲5%	453,162	▲4%
2023	389,137	▲14%	45,722	▼9%	434,859	▲11%
2022	341,135	▲57%	49,977	▲93%	391,112	▲64%
2021	280,449	▲25%	35,265	▲329%	315,714	▲35%
2020	224,970	▼57%	8,227	▼93%	233,197	▼64%
2019	529,091	▼7%	120,691	▲36%	649,782	▼1%
2018	567,971	▼2%	88,639	▼10%	656,610	▼4%
2017	582,499	▲9%	98,500	▲506%	680,999	▲24%
2016	534,695	▲5%	16,260	▲115%	550,955	▲7%
2015	506,882	▲27%	7,577	▲44%	514,459	▲27%
2014	399,079	▲44%	5,261	▲14%	404,340	▲44%
2013	277,047	▲48%	4,596	▼4%	281,643	▲47%
2012	187,337	▲11%	4,771	▼25%	192,108	▲10%
2011	168,260	▲26%	6,367	▲237%	174,627	▲29%
2010	133,116	▼10%	1,889	▼29%	135,005	▼10%
2009	148,131	▼6%	2,649	▲356%	150,780	▼4%
2008	156,780	▲4%	581	▲111%	157,361	▲4%
2007	150,937	Steady	275	Steady	151,212	Steady
