= Süleymanlı, Buldan =

Village in Turkey

Süleymanlı
- Neighbourhood
- Location in Turkey Süleymanlı (Turkey Aegean)
- Coordinates: 38°2′49″N 28°45′50″E
- Country: Turkey
- Province: Denizli
- District: Buldan
- Population (2022): 156
- Time zone: UTC+3 (TRT)

Süleymanlı is a neighbourhood in the municipality and district of Buldan, Denizli Province in Turkey. Its population is 156 (2022).
