= Henabad =

Henabad or Hanabad (Persian: هنااباد), also rendered as Hinabad or Haneh Abad, may refer to:

- Henabad-e Olya
- Henabad-e Sofla
