= Dazkırı District =

- District
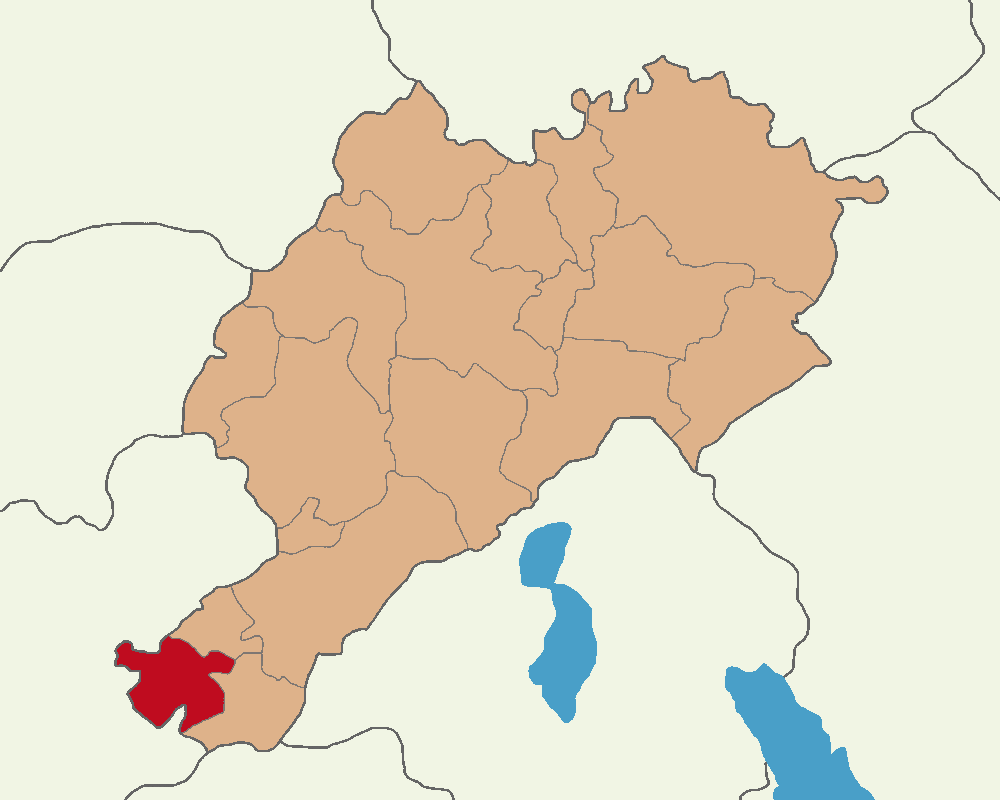
- Map showing Dazkırı District in Afyonkarahisar Province

- Location in Turkey Dazkırı District (Turkey Aegean)
- Coordinates: 37°55′N 29°52′E
- Country: Turkey
- Province: Afyonkarahisar
- Seat: Dazkırı
- Area: 408 km^{2} (158 sq mi)
- Population (2021): 11,364
  - Density: 27.9/km^{2} (72.1/sq mi)
- Time zone: UTC+3 (TRT)

Dazkırı District is a district of Afyonkarahisar Province of Turkey. Its seat is the town Dazkırı. Its area is 408 km^{2}, and its population is 11,364 (2021). Lake Acıgöl, the second-largest alkaline lake in the world, is largely within this district. On the Denizli side of the lake there are plants extracting sodium sulphate, but the Dazkırı lake-shore is still agricultural. There is also potential for mining chrome and other minerals.

== Composition ==
There is one municipality in Dazkırı District:

- Dazkırı

There are 16 villages in Dazkırı District:

- Akarca
- Arıköy
- Aşağıyenice
- Bozan
- Çiftlikköy
- Darıcılar
- Hasandede
- Hisaralan
- İdrisköy
- Karaağaçkuyusu
- Kızılören
- Örtülü
- Sarıkavak
- Yaylaköy
- Yukarıyenice
- Yüreğil
