= Çamköy, Buldan =

Village in Turkey

Çamköy
- Neighbourhood
- Location in Turkey Çamköy (Turkey Aegean)
- Coordinates: 38.1295°N 28.9164°E
- Country: Turkey
- Province: Denizli
- District: Buldan
- Population (2022): 171
- Time zone: UTC+3 (TRT)

Çamköy is a neighbourhood in the municipality and district of Buldan, Denizli Province in Turkey. Its population is 171 (2022).
