= Bozan, Dazkırı =

Bozan
- Village
- Location within Turkey Location within Turkey Aegean
- Coordinates: 37.9800°N 29.9153°E
- Country: Turkey
- Province: Afyonkarahisar
- District: Dazkırı
- Population (2021): 420
- Time zone: UTC+3 (TRT)

Bozan is a village in the Dazkırı District, Afyonkarahisar Province, Turkey. Its population is 420 (2021).
