= Sarıköy, Başmakçı =

Sarıköy
- Village
- Location within Turkey Location within Turkey Aegean
- Coordinates: 37°54′55″N 30°5′36″E
- Country: Turkey
- Province: Afyonkarahisar
- District: Başmakçı
- Population (2021): 232
- Time zone: UTC+3 (TRT)

Sarıköy is a village in the Başmakçı District, Afyonkarahisar Province, Turkey. Its population is 232 (2021).
