= Yaylaköy, Dazkırı =

Yaylaköy
- Village
- Location within Turkey Location within Turkey Aegean
- Coordinates: 37.9167°N 29.7500°E
- Country: Turkey
- Province: Afyonkarahisar
- District: Dazkırı
- Population (2021): 82
- Time zone: UTC+3 (TRT)

Yaylaköy is a village in the Dazkırı District, Afyonkarahisar Province, Turkey. Its population is 82 (2021).
