= Darıcılar, Dazkırı =

Darıcılar
- Village
- Location within Turkey Location within Turkey Aegean
- Coordinates: 37°53′N 29°44′E
- Country: Turkey
- Province: Afyonkarahisar
- District: Dazkırı
- Population (2021): 147
- Time zone: UTC+3 (TRT)

Darıcılar is a village in the Dazkırı District, Afyonkarahisar Province, Turkey. Its population is 147 (2021).
