= Tripolis on the Meander =

Ancient Greek city in Turkey

- Τρίπολις (Greek)
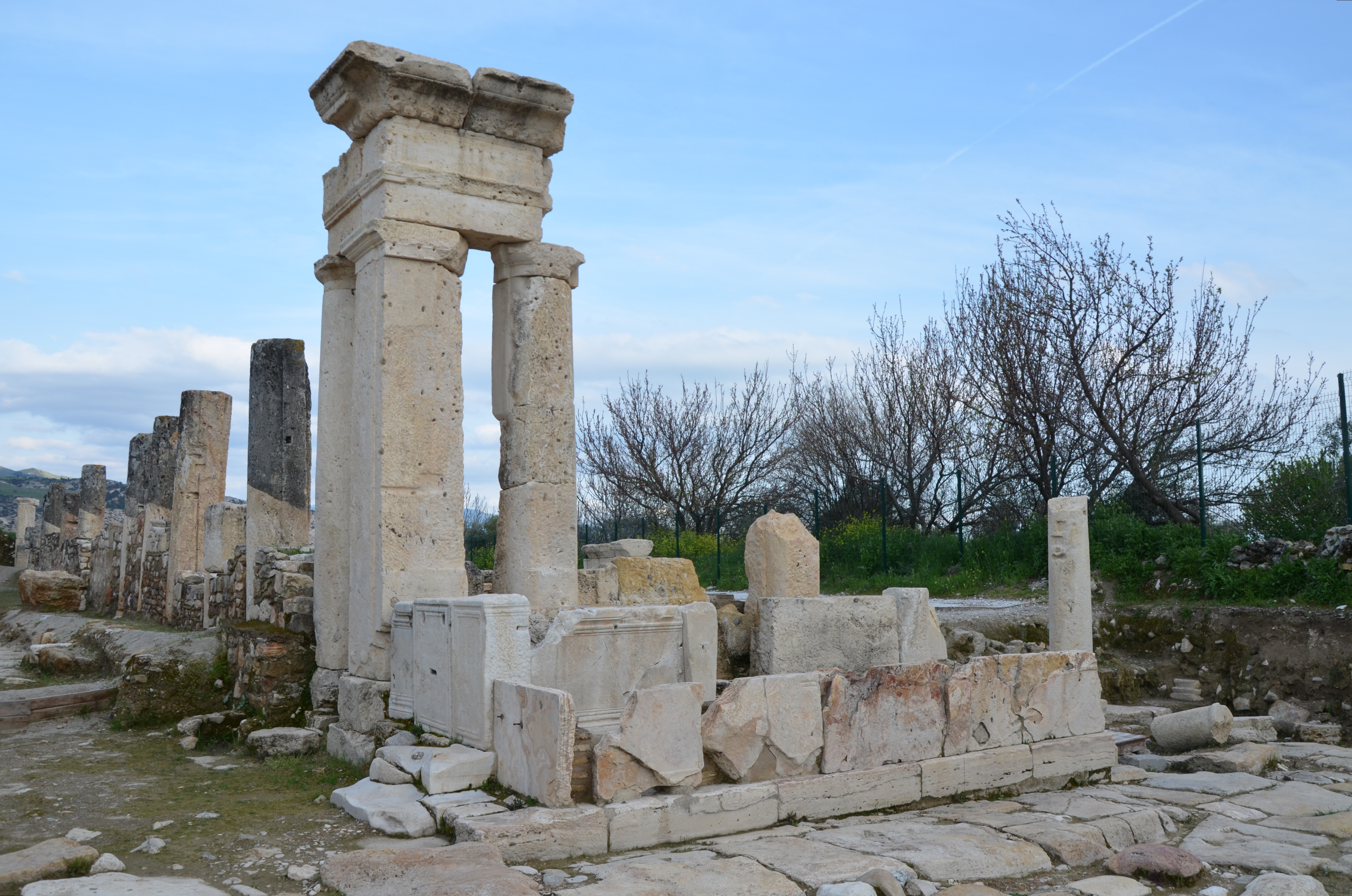

- Location within Turkey
- 38°03′N 28°57′E
- Location: Turkey
- Region: Denizli Province

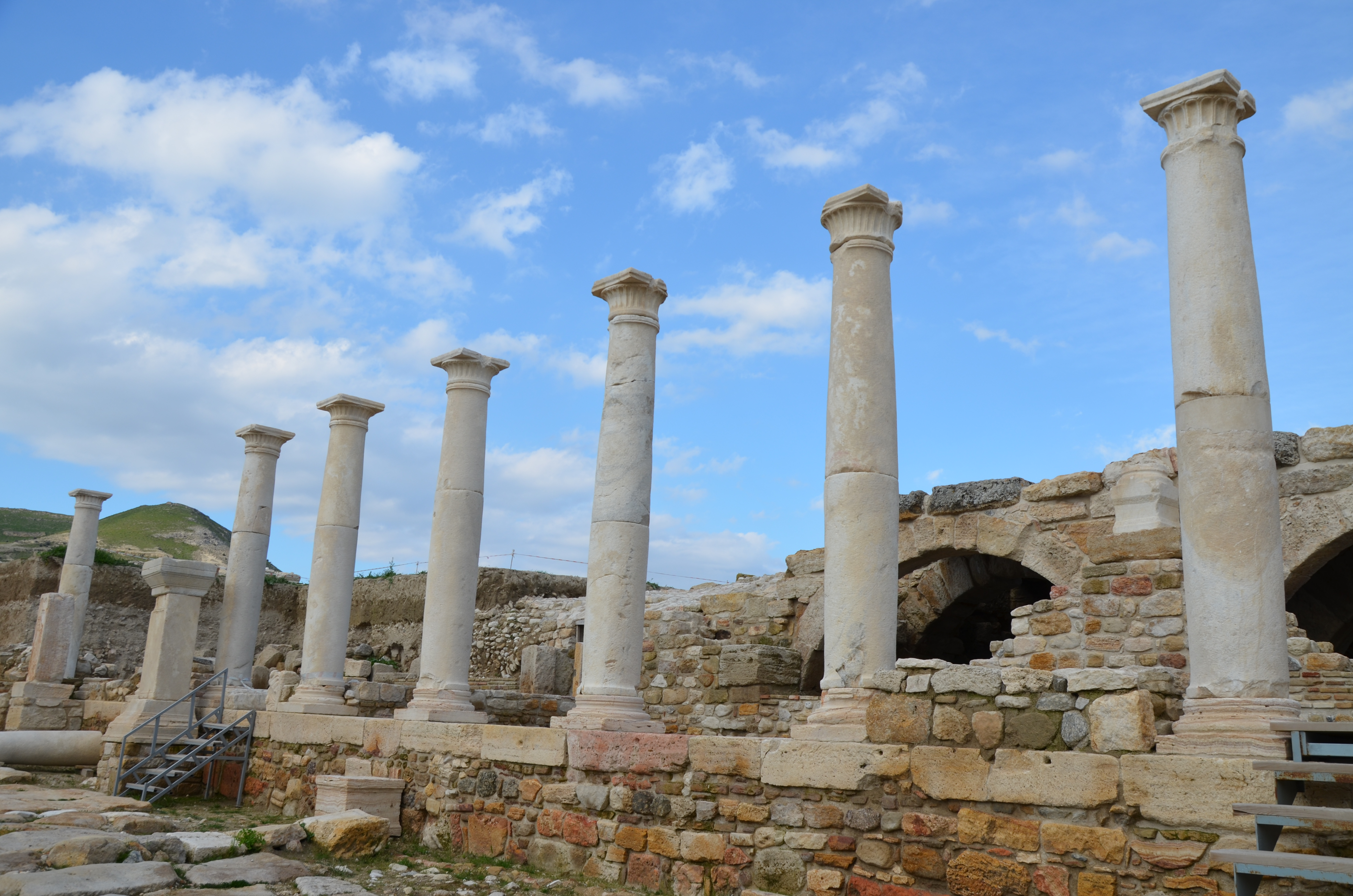
Ruins of Tripolis ad Maeandrum near Yenicekent, Turkey

Tripolis on the Meander (Greek: Τρίπολις, Eth. Greek: Τριπολίτης, Latin: Tripolis ad Maeandrum) – also Neapolis (Greek: Νεάπολις), Apollonia (Greek: Απολλωνία), and Antoniopolis (Greek: Αντωνιόπολις) – was an ancient city on the borders of Phrygia, Caria and Lydia, on the northern bank of the upper course of the Maeander, and on the road leading from Sardes by Philadelphia to Laodicea ad Lycum. (It. Ant. p. 336; Tab. Peut.) It was situated 20 km to the northwest of Hierapolis.

Ruins of it still exist near Yenicekent (formerly Yeniji or Kash Yeniji), a township in the Buldan district of Denizli Province, Turkey. (Arundell, Seven Churches, p. 245; Hamilton, Researches, i. p. 525; Fellows, Asia Minor, p. 287.) The ruins mostly date from the Roman and Byzantine periods and include a theater, baths, city walls, and a necropolis. An ancient church, dating back 1,500 years, has been unearthed in 2013.

== Province ==
The earliest mention of Tripolis is by Pliny the Elder (v. 30), who treats it as a Lydian town. Ptolemy (v. 2. § 18) and Stephanus of Byzantium describe it as a Carian town. Hierocles (p. 669) likewise calls it a Lydian town.

William Mitchell Ramsay also places Tripolis within Lydia.

The city minted coins in antiquity, some of which bore an image of Leto. Catalogues of coins of Tripolis generally refer to the city as belonging to Lydia. However, one book on coin collecting list Tripolis as part of Lydia on one page, but speaks of it as part of Caria on another.

A website on which various contributors give news of Turkish archaeology treats Tripolis as part of Phrygia.

== Other names ==
Pliny says the city was also called Apollonia (Greek: Ἀπολλωνία), and Stephanus of Byzantium that, in his time, it was called Neapolis (Greek: Νεάπολις).

== Bishopric ==
The city of Tripolis was the seat of an ancient bishopric, suffragan to Sardis. Very little is known of the Bishopric, but we retain the names of some bishops, including:

- Ramsay reports that a bishop of Tripolis in Lydia named Agogius attended the First Council of Nicaea in 325.
- Leontius
- Commodus at Council of Chalcedon. and Ephesus
- Paulus, fl. 451
- Joannes, fl. 451
- Anastasius
- Sisinnius

The see is included in the Catholic Church's list of titular sees, which treats it as part of the late Roman province of Lydia.

- Nicolas Fryes de Brisaco, (21 June 1456 Appointed – 17 July 1498)
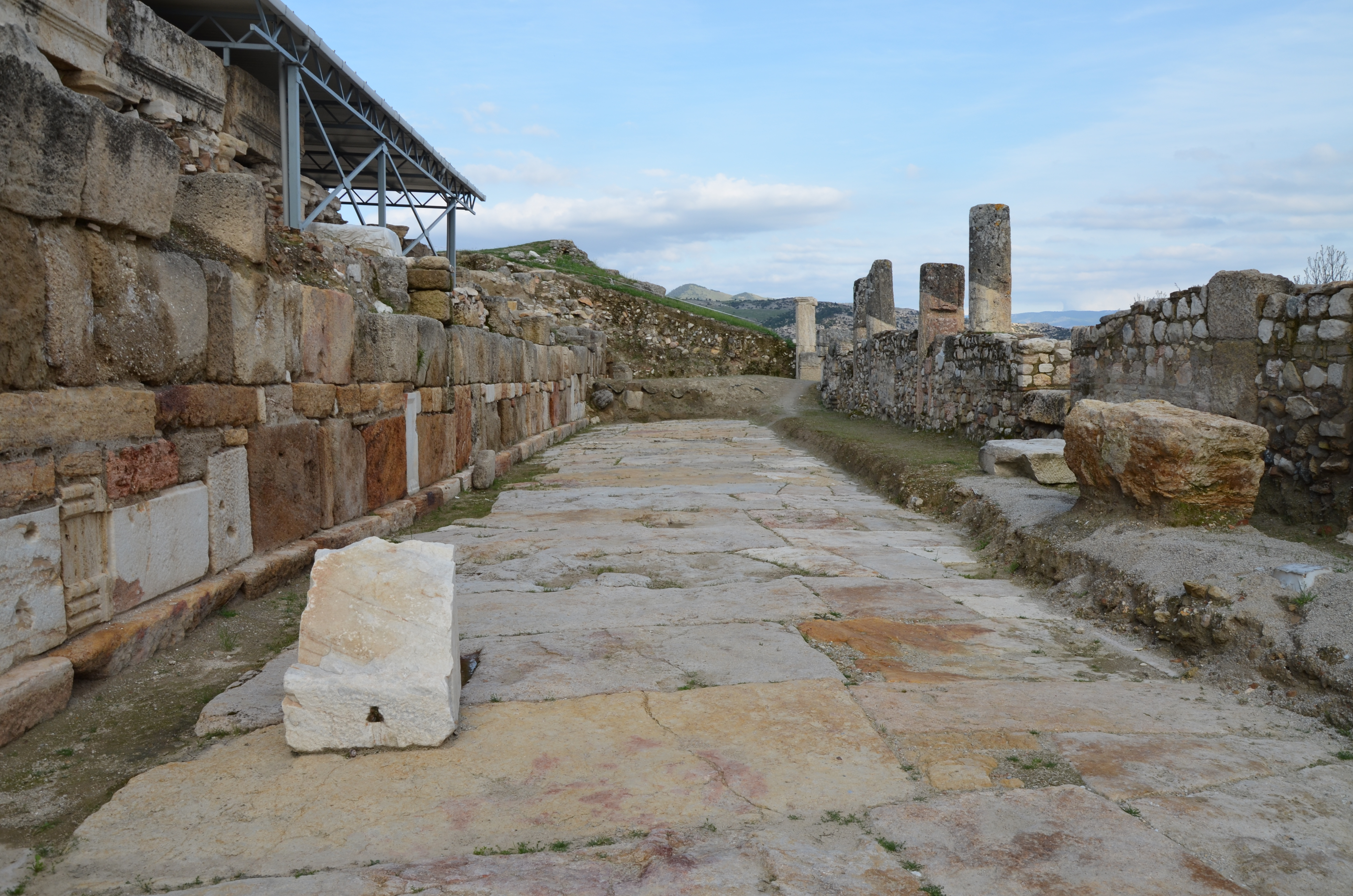
Ruins of Tripolis ad Maeandrum near Yenicekent, Turkey

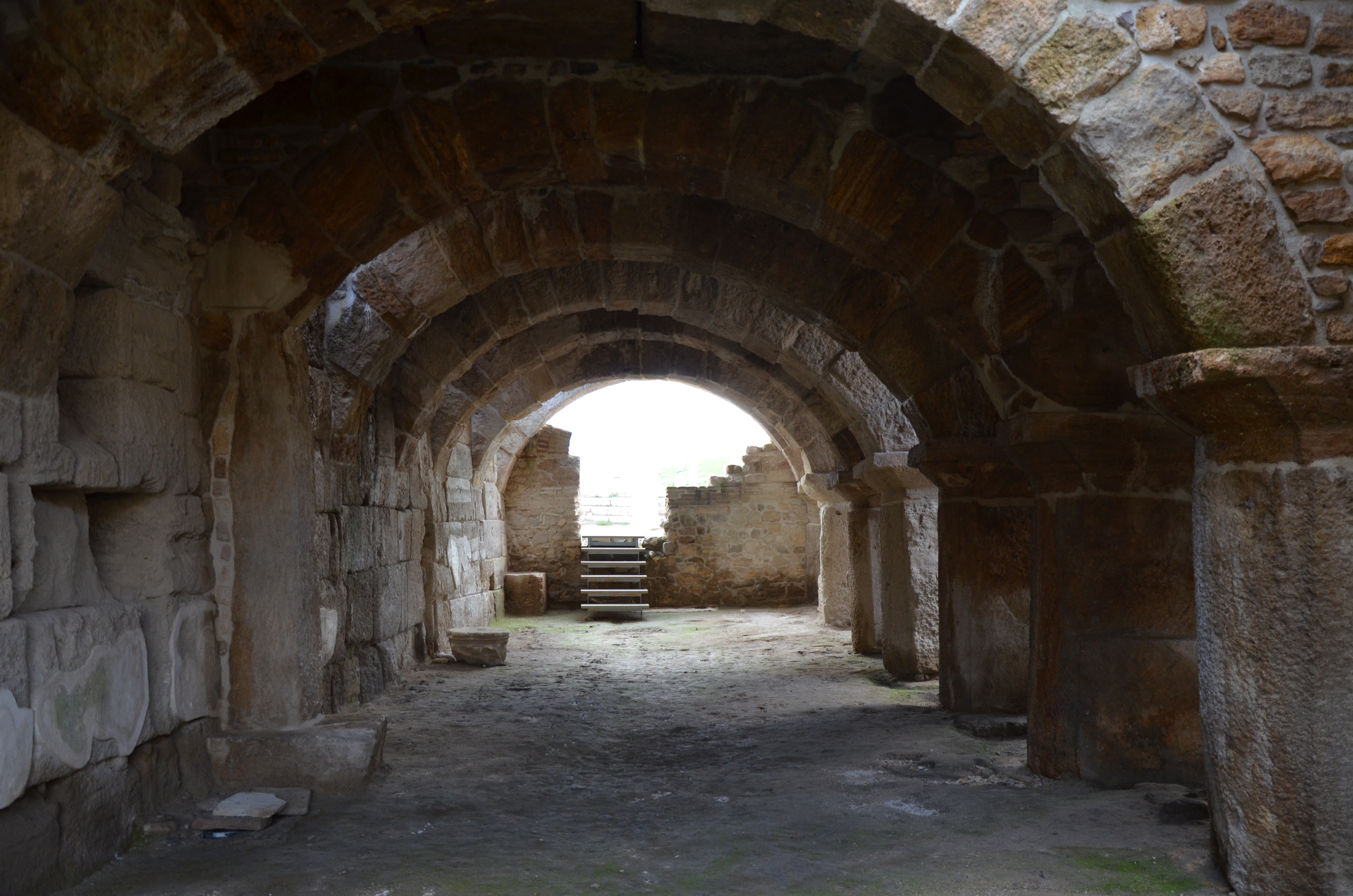
Supportive arch in Tripolis, Turkey

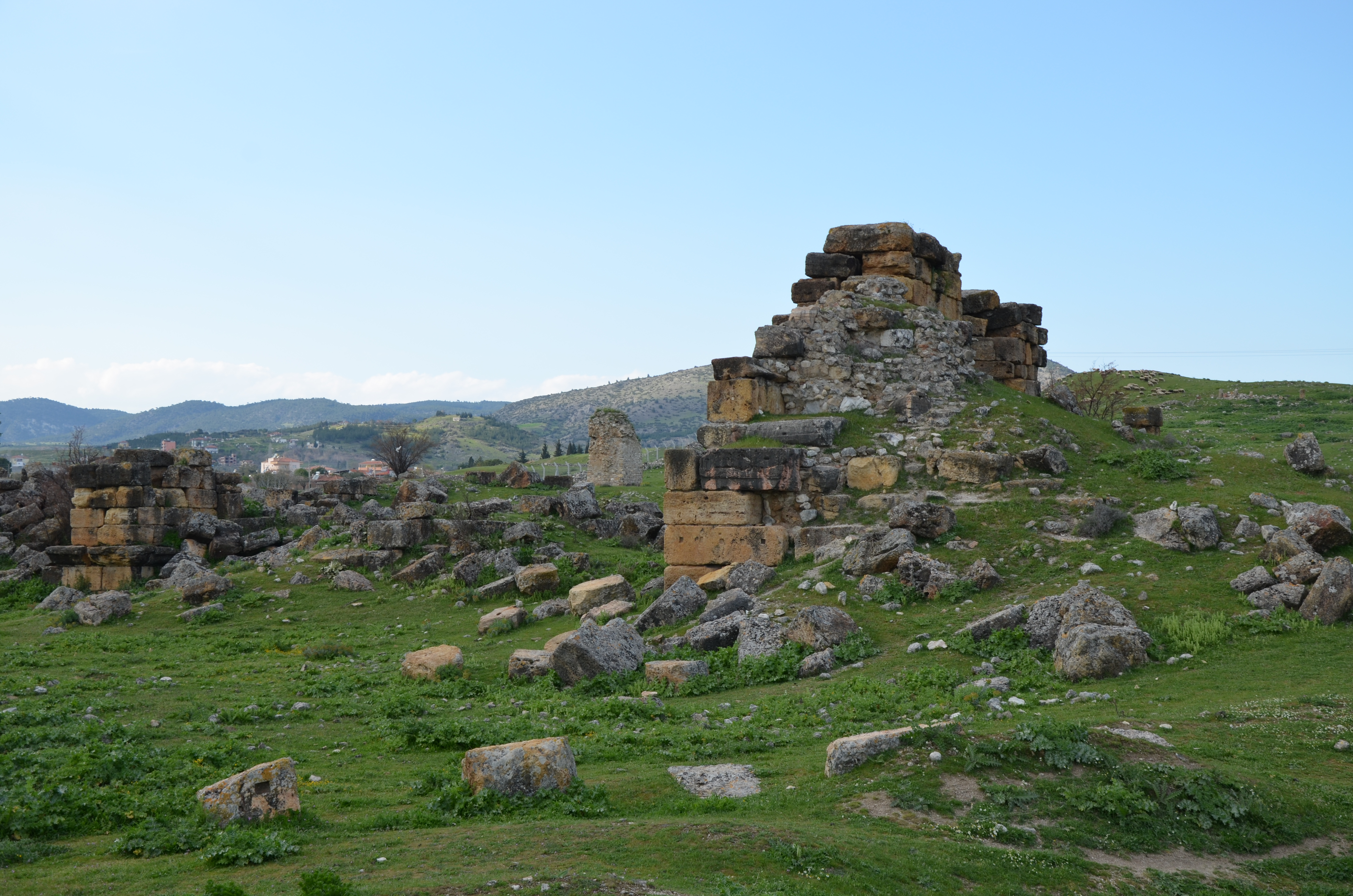
Further ruins

== See also ==
- List of ancient Greek cities
