= Hasandede, Dazkırı =

Hasandede
- Village
- Location within Turkey Location within Turkey Aegean
- Coordinates: 37.9776°N 29.7462°E
- Country: Turkey
- Province: Afyonkarahisar
- District: Dazkırı
- Population (2021): 104
- Time zone: UTC+3 (TRT)

Hasandede is a village in the Dazkırı District, Afyonkarahisar Province, Turkey. Its population is 104 (2021).
