= Akpınar, Başmakçı =

Akpınar
- Village
- Location within Turkey Location within Turkey Aegean
- Coordinates: 37°48′41″N 29°54′55″E
- Country: Turkey
- Province: Afyonkarahisar
- District: Başmakçı
- Population (2021): 326
- Time zone: UTC+3 (TRT)

Akpınar is a village in the Başmakçı District, Afyonkarahisar Province, Turkey. Its population is 326 (2021). It lies on the south shore of Lake Acıgöl, near the border with the districts of Burdur and Denizli.
