= Hayriye, Çardak =

Village in Turkey

Hayriye
- Neighbourhood
- Country: Turkey
- Province: Denizli
- District: Çardak
- Population (2022): 238
- Time zone: UTC+3 (TRT)

Hayriye is a neighbourhood in the municipality and district of Çardak, Denizli Province in Turkey. Its population is 238 (2022).
