= Yenicekent =

- Neighbourhood
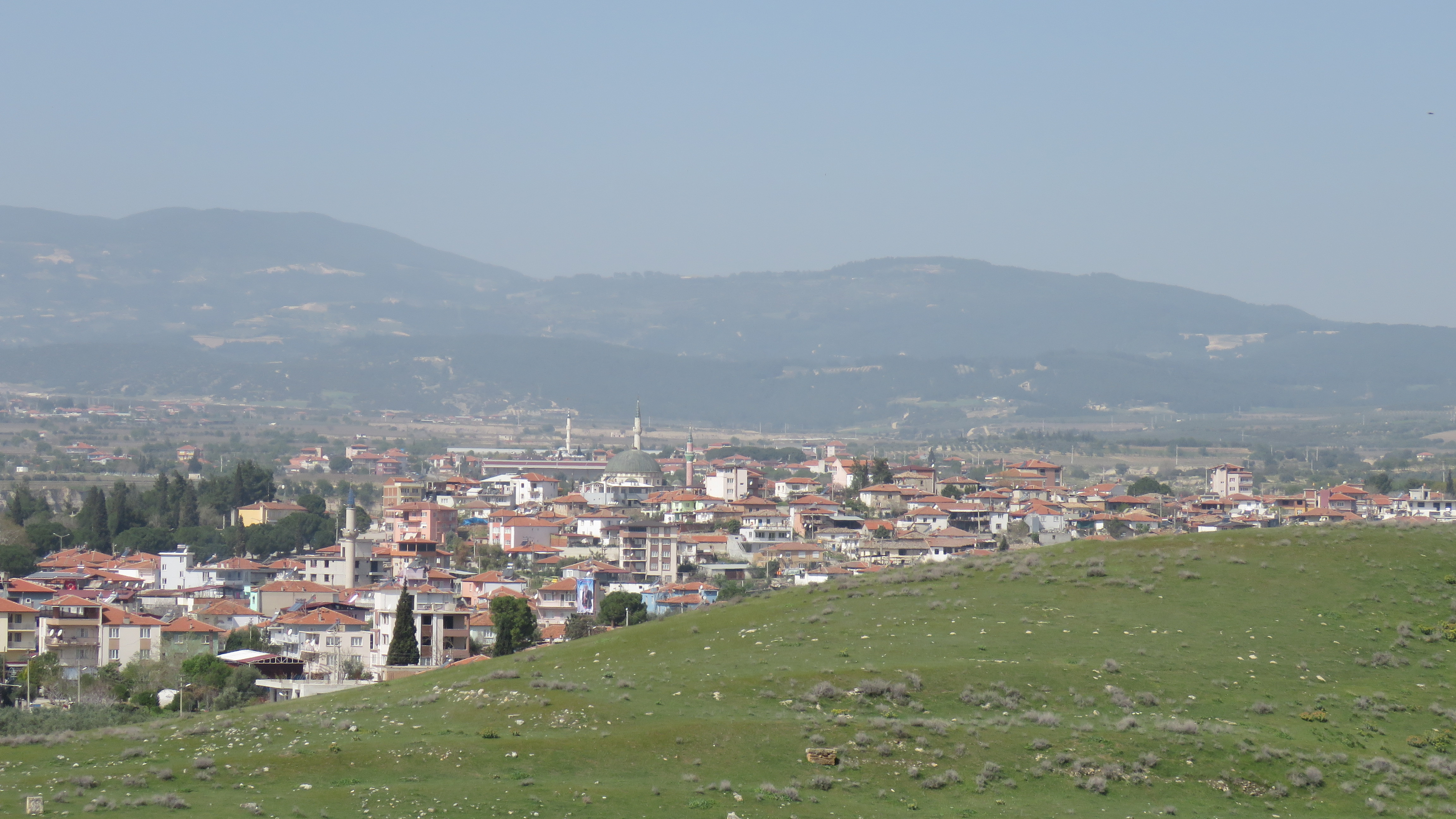
- Yenicekent seen from the east, from Tripolis of Phrygia

- Location within Turkey Location within Turkey Aegean
- Coordinates: 38°02′38″N 28°56′10″E
- Country: Turkey
- Province: Denizli
- District: Buldan
- Population (2022): 2,116
- Time zone: UTC+3 (TRT)

Yenicekent is a neighbourhood of the municipality and district of Buldan, Denizli Province, Turkey. Its population is 2,116 (2022). Before the 2013 reorganisation, it was a town (belde). The region is noted for its high plains covered with dense forests. Yenicekent is also the site of ancient Tripolis of Phrygia.

== History ==
Tripolis of Phrygia was an ancient settlement near the village of Yenice in Buldan district. Ruins date back to the Hellenistic period. Tripolis, which was on the Sardis-Laodicea road extending down to Mesopotamia, was established for military and commercial purposes. Tripolis became famous with the expansion of Christianity with its people working in agriculture and weaving. The present weaving industry in Buldan can be traced back to ancient times. Few remains of the city walls; only the theatre, the hippodrome and some tombs survived the great earthquake of 1354. The ruins are unexplored to date and are situated east of the modern town, on the slopes between Yenicekent and Büyük Menderes River bed, at a distance of 40 km (25 mi) from Denizli city.
