= Ekinlik, Başmakçı =

Ekinlik
- Village
- Location within Turkey Location within Turkey Aegean
- Coordinates: 37°55′43″N 30°7′13″E
- Country: Turkey
- Province: Afyonkarahisar
- District: Başmakçı
- Population (2021): 142
- Time zone: UTC+3 (TRT)

Ekinlik is a village in the Başmakçı District, Afyonkarahisar Province, Turkey. Its population is 142 (2021). It is located east of Akkoyunlu.
