= Örtülü, Dazkırı =

Örtülü
- Village
- Location within Turkey Location within Turkey Aegean
- Coordinates: 37.9030°N 29.7818°E
- Country: Turkey
- Province: Afyonkarahisar
- District: Dazkırı
- Population (2021): 26
- Time zone: UTC+3 (TRT)

Örtülü is a village in the Dazkırı District, Afyonkarahisar Province, Turkey. Its population is 26 (2021).
