= İdrisköy, Dazkırı =

İdrisköy
- Village
- Location within Turkey Location within Turkey Aegean
- Coordinates: 37°54′N 29°42′E
- Country: Turkey
- Province: Afyonkarahisar
- District: Dazkırı
- Population (2021): 117
- Time zone: UTC+3 (TRT)

İdrisköy (also: İdris) is a village in the Dazkırı District, Afyonkarahisar Province, Turkey. Its population is 117 (2021).
