= Karaağaçkuyusu, Dazkırı =

Karaağaçkuyusu
- Village
- Location within Turkey Location within Turkey Aegean
- Coordinates: 38°01′N 29°47′E
- Country: Turkey
- Province: Afyonkarahisar
- District: Dazkırı
- Population (2021): 1,170
- Time zone: UTC+3 (TRT)

Karaağaçkuyusu is a village in the Dazkırı District, Afyonkarahisar Province, Turkey. Its population is 1,170 (2021).
