= Aşağıyenice, Dazkırı =

Aşağıyenice
- Village
- Location within Turkey Location within Turkey Aegean
- Coordinates: 37.8917°N 29.8590°E
- Country: Turkey
- Province: Afyonkarahisar
- District: Dazkırı
- Population (2021): 169
- Time zone: UTC+3 (TRT)

Aşağıyenice is a village in the Dazkırı District, Afyonkarahisar Province, Turkey. Its population is 169 (2021).
