= Kovanoluk, Buldan =

Village in Turkey

Kovanoluk
- Neighbourhood
- Country: Turkey
- Province: Denizli
- District: Buldan
- Population (2022): 206
- Time zone: UTC+3 (TRT)

Kovanoluk is a neighbourhood in the municipality and district of Buldan, Denizli Province in Turkey. Its population is 206 (2022).
