= Çiftlikköy, Dazkırı =

Çiftlikköy
- Village
- Location within Turkey Location within Turkey Aegean
- Country: Turkey
- Province: Afyonkarahisar
- District: Dazkırı
- Population (2021): 229
- Time zone: UTC+3 (TRT)

Çiftlikköy (also: Çiftlik) is a village in the Dazkırı District, Afyonkarahisar Province, Turkey. Its population is 229 (2021).
