= Akkoyunlu, Başmakçı =

Akkoyunlu
- Village
- Location within Turkey Location within Turkey Aegean
- Coordinates: 37°55′43″N 30°4′5″E
- Country: Turkey
- Province: Afyonkarahisar
- District: Başmakçı
- Population (2021): 158
- Time zone: UTC+3 (TRT)

Akkoyunlu is a village in the Başmakçı District, Afyonkarahisar Province, Turkey. Its population is 158 (2021). It lies northeast of the district capital of Başmakçı. Yelalan lies to the north.
