= Çevlik, Başmakçı =

Çevlik
- Village
- Location within Turkey Location within Turkey Aegean
- Coordinates: 37°58′5″N 30°1′39″E
- Country: Turkey
- Province: Afyonkarahisar
- District: Başmakçı
- Population (2021): 80
- Time zone: UTC+3 (TRT)

Çevlik is a village in the Başmakçı District, Afyonkarahisar Province, Turkey. Its population is 80 (2021). It is located southeast of Hırkaköy.
