= Buldan =

- District and municipality
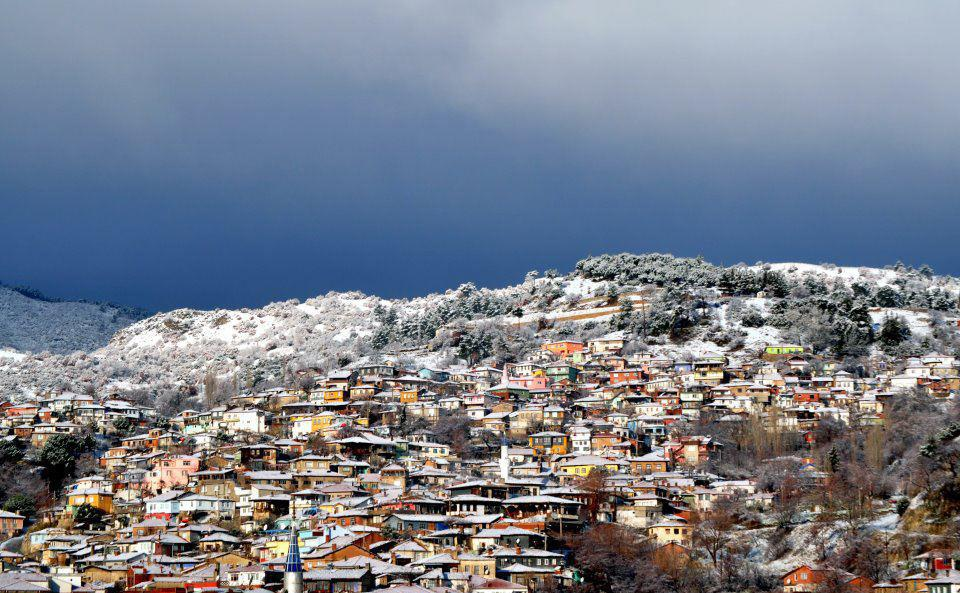

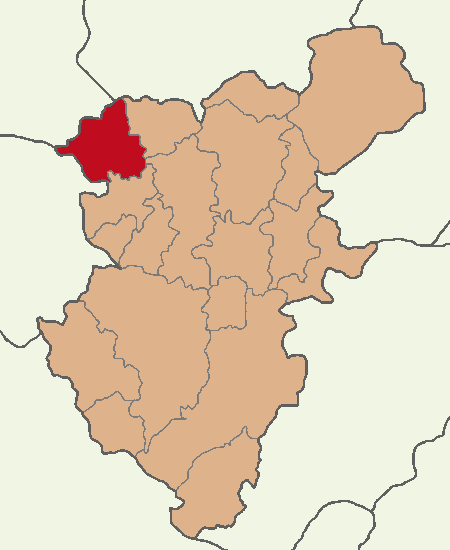
- Map showing Buldan District in Denizli Province

- Location within Turkey Location within Turkey Aegean
- Coordinates: 38°2′42″N 28°49′50″E
- Country: Turkey
- Province: Denizli

Government
  - Mayor: Mehmet Ali Orpak (CHP)
- Area: 523 km^{2} (202 sq mi)
- Population (2022): 26,630
  - Density: 50.9/km^{2} (132/sq mi)
- Time zone: UTC+3 (TRT)
- Postal code: 20400
- Area code: 0258
- Website: www.buldan.bel.tr

Buldan is a municipality and district of Denizli Province, Turkey. Its area is 523 km^{2}, and its population is 26,630 (2022). Buldan district area neighbors to the east and the south three other districts of the same province, namely Güney, Pamukkale and Sarayköy, and to the west by the areas of three districts of Aydın Province, Buharkent, Kuyucak and Karacasu, and to the northwest by Sarıgöl district of Manisa Province.

The town of Buldan is located at a distance of 46 km (29 mi) from the province seat of Denizli and lies at an altitude of 690 meters. It extends along a hilltop area, with hillsides covered with pomegranates, figs, vines and blackberries. Kestane Deresi (Chestnut Stream) is a favourite popular excursion spot situated in the upper parts of the main town.

Buldan's depending township of Yenicekent is the site of ancient Tripolis of Phrygia.

== Buldan cloth production ==
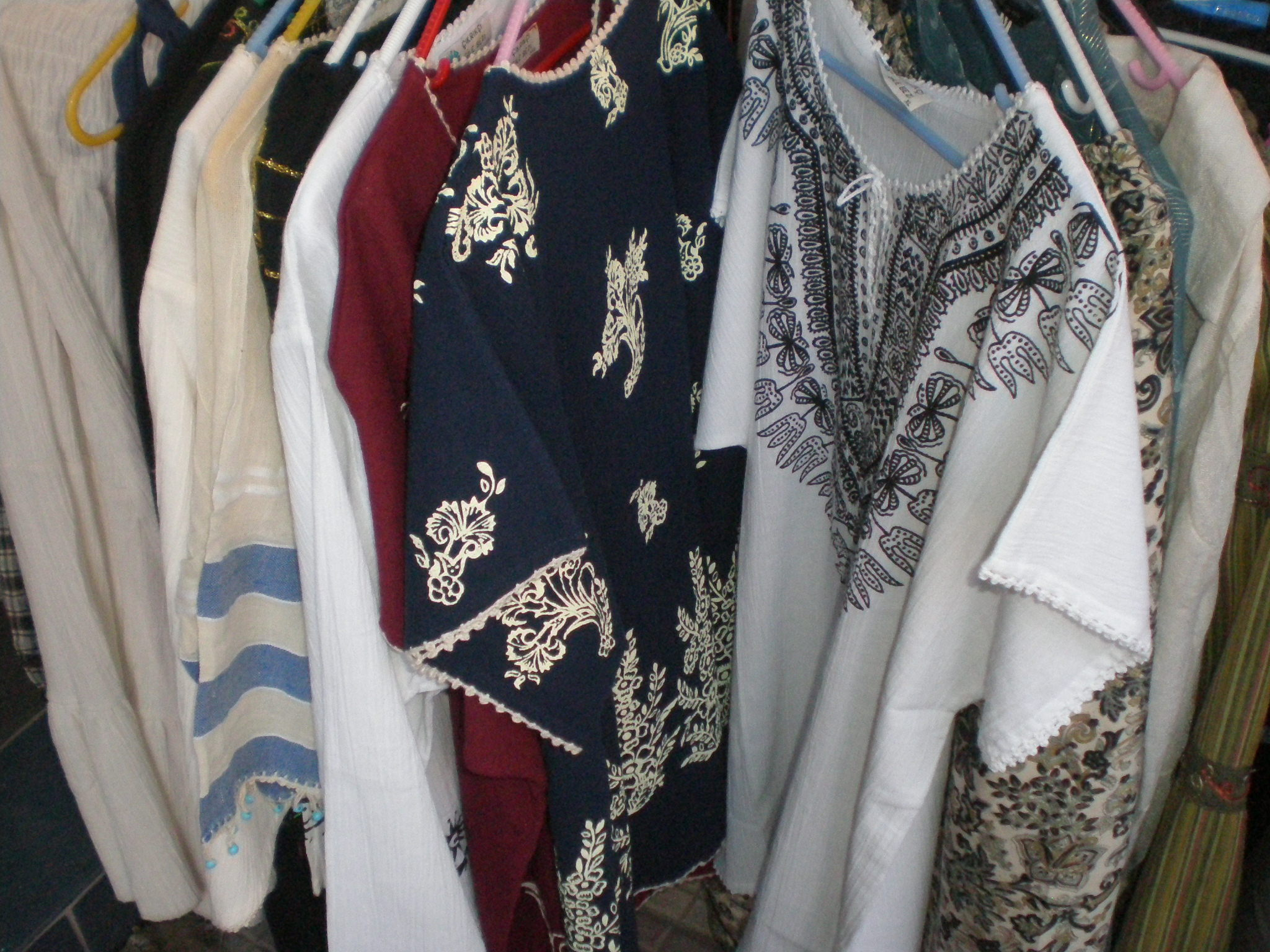
Clothing made out of Buldan cloth

Historically, the town has been a very important center of Turkey's textile industry, a tradition it actively pursues to this day, still largely based on independent craftspersons.

Sanjak (subprovince) of Denizli was the most vibrant center cloth production center in western Anatolia during the later 19th century and the fame of the region rested at the time on the output of two of depending large villages, Buldan and Kadıköy, as well as the neighboring town of Babadağ.

Buldan was famed for a thin handwoven cheesecloth-type fabric, with laced edges and used chiefly for bed covers and table cloths, called as "Buldan bezi" (Buldan clothes) under the name of locality. Already back in the 19th century, the townspeople wove 40,000 pieces of all-cotton colored striped cloth used called alaca used for attires and a similar number of cotton and mattress clothes. Buldan weavers also produced over one-half million handkerchiefs and a large number of cotton curtains. Another textile from Buldan that deserves mention is a vivid violet silk (peştemal) woven as a rectangular panel to be wrapped around the body. Yet another is kaplama, colorful head coverings typical of Turkey's Aegean Region and worn by men and women alike with different colors associated with each gender and various regions. Thanks to sizable production effort, the number of looms in Buldan had risen to 1,500 by the end of the 19th century.

The town's expertise reaches further back in time and a sign at the town entry greets visitors with the pride expressed for having woven the kaftan of Beyazid I the Thunderbolt for his marriage with Hafsa Hatun, daughter of Aydinid İsa Bey, in 1390. Tripolis (Phrygia) itself, a first-century AD Roman foundation, may have had the weaving industry as its reason for coming into existence.

17th century Ottoman documents also mention Buldan's importance as a textile production center, informing that until circa 1650s, the cotton cloth woven in Buldan, Denizli and Manisa was taken to Tire for dyeing, after which time that part of the operation also started to be handled locally.

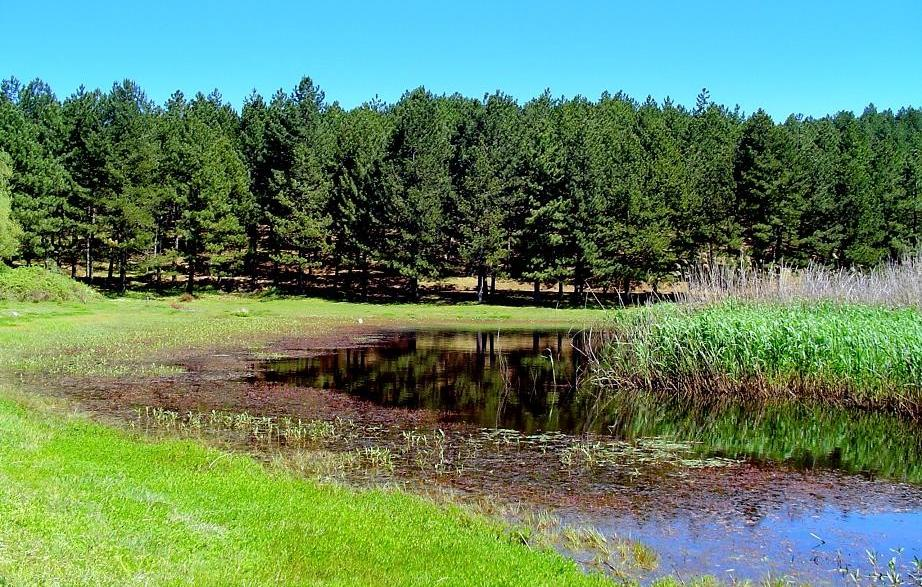
Süleymanlı Plateau near Buldan

== Population history ==
Buldan's population has grown slowly since 1955. The population of the municipality of Buldan is shown below, in its geography at the years given. Note that the municipality of Buldan was expanded to cover the whole Buldan District in 2013.

Historical population

Year	Pop.	±% p.a.
1955	10,241	—
1960	10,496	+0.49%
1965	9,813	−1.34%
1970	10,076	+0.53%
1975	11,115	+1.98%
1980	10,939	−0.32%
1985	11,681	+1.32%

Year	Pop.	±% p.a.
1990	12,202	+0.88%
1997	12,900	+0.80%
2007	15,066	+1.56%
2012	15,914	+1.10%
2013	27,558	+73.17%
2017	27,248	−0.28%
2022	26,630	−0.46%

Source: Population censuses (1955-1997) and TÜIK (2007-2022)

== Composition ==
There are 45 neighbourhoods in Buldan District:

- 4 Eylül
- Aktaş
- Alacaoğlu
- Alandız
- Beyler
- Boğazçiftlik
- Bölmekaya
- Bostanyeri
- Bozalan
- Bursa
- Çamköy
- Çarşı
- Çatak
- Çaybaşı
- Cumhuriyet
- Derbent
- Dımbazlar
- Doğan
- Düzalan
- Girne
- Gölbaşı
- Gülalan
- Güroluk
- Hasanbeyler
- Helvacılar
- Kadıköy
- Karaköy
- Karşıyaka
- Kaşıkçı
- Kırandamı
- Kovanoluk
- Kurtuluş
- Kurudere
- Mahmutlu
- Oğuz
- Sarımahmutlu
- Süleymanlı
- Turan
- Türlübey
- Yalçınkaya
- Yayla
- Yeni
- Yeniçam
- Yenicekent
- Yeşildere

== See also ==
- Tripolis of Phrygia

== Sources ==
- Ronald T. Marchese, ed. (2005). The Fabric of Life: Cultural Transformations In Turkish Society. Global Academic Publishing, Binghamton University. ISBN 978-1-58684-256-7.
