= Yüreğil, Dazkırı =

Yüreğil
- Village
- Location within Turkey Location within Turkey Aegean
- Coordinates: 37.8777°N 29.8744°E
- Country: Turkey
- Province: Afyonkarahisar
- District: Dazkırı
- Population (2021): 1,491
- Time zone: UTC+3 (TRT)

Yüreğil is a village in the Dazkırı District, Afyonkarahisar Province, Turkey. Its population is 1,491 (2021). Before the 2013 reorganisation, it was a town (belde).
