= Ayvaz, Çardak =

Village in Turkey

Ayvaz
- Neighbourhood
- Location in Turkey Ayvaz (Turkey Aegean)
- Coordinates: 37°44′N 29°46′E
- Country: Turkey
- Province: Denizli
- District: Çardak
- Population (2022): 29
- Time zone: UTC+3 (TRT)

Ayvaz is a neighbourhood in the municipality and district of Çardak, Denizli Province in Turkey. Its population is 29 (2022).
