= Gölcük, Çardak =

Village in Turkey

Gölcük
- Neighbourhood
- Location in Turkey Gölcük (Turkey Aegean)
- Coordinates: 37.7246°N 29.7874°E
- Country: Turkey
- Province: Denizli
- District: Çardak
- Population (2022): 209
- Time zone: UTC+3 (TRT)

Gölcük is a neighbourhood in the municipality and district of Çardak, Denizli Province in Turkey. Its population is 209 (2022).
