= Söğütlü, Çardak =

Village in Turkey

Söğütlü
- Neighbourhood
- Location in Turkey Söğütlü (Turkey Aegean)
- Coordinates: 37°40′24″N 29°34′15″E
- Country: Turkey
- Province: Denizli
- District: Çardak
- Population (2022): 450
- Time zone: UTC+3 (TRT)

Söğütlü is a neighbourhood in the municipality and district of Çardak, Denizli Province in Turkey. Its population is 450 (2022).
