= Yeşildere, Buldan =

Village in Turkey

Yeşildere
- Neighbourhood
- Country: Turkey
- Province: Denizli
- District: Buldan
- Population (2024): 85
- Time zone: UTC+3 (TRT)

Yeşildere is a neighbourhood of the municipality and district of Buldan, Denizli Province, Turkey. Its population is 85 (2024).
