= Başmakçı District =

- District
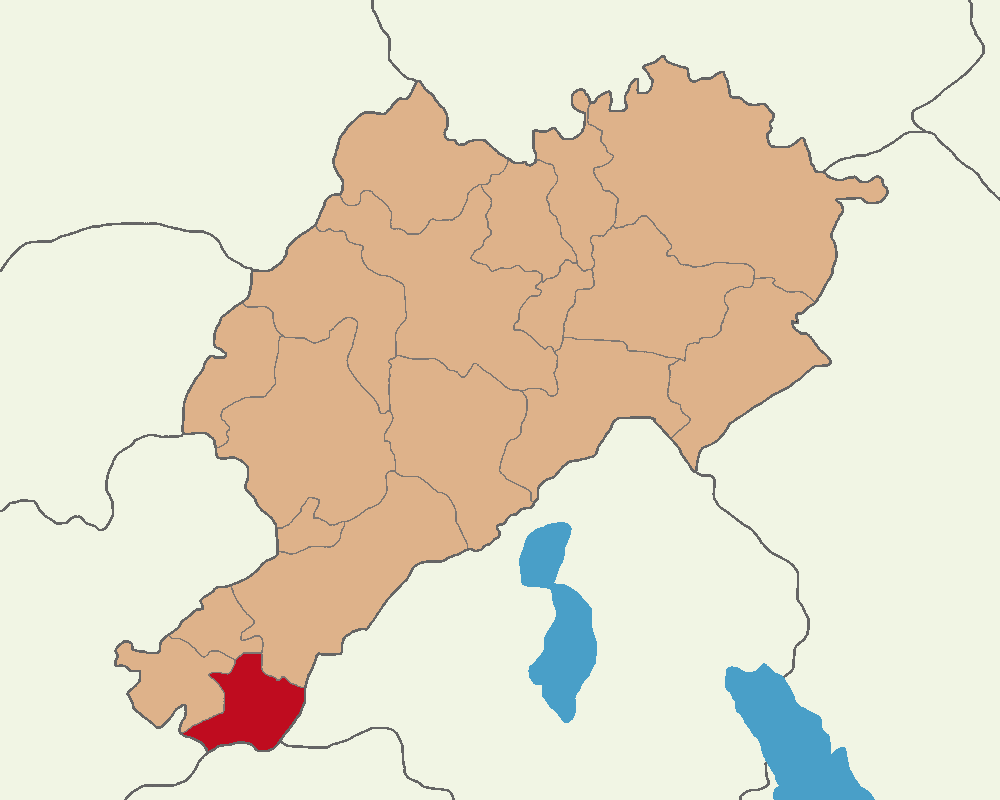
- Map showing Başmakçı District in Afyonkarahisar Province

- Location in Turkey Başmakçı District (Turkey Aegean)
- Coordinates: 37°53′N 30°00′E
- Country: Turkey
- Province: Afyonkarahisar
- Seat: Başmakçı
- Area: 361 km^{2} (139 sq mi)
- Population (2021): 9,536
  - Density: 26.4/km^{2} (68.4/sq mi)
- Time zone: UTC+3 (TRT)

Başmakçı District is a district of Afyonkarahisar Province of Turkey. Its seat is the town Başmakçı. Its area is 361 km^{2}, and its population is 9,536 (2021).

== Composition ==
There is one municipality in Başmakçı District:

- Başmakçı

There are 14 villages in Başmakçı District:

- Akkeçili
- Akkoyunlu
- Akpınar
- Beltarla
- Çevlik
- Çığrı
- Ekinlik
- Hırkaköy
- Küllüce
- Ovacık
- Sarıköy
- Yaka
- Yassıören
- Yukarıbeltarla
