= Ovacık, Başmakçı =

Ovacık
- Village
- Location within Turkey Location within Turkey Aegean
- Coordinates: 37°50′47″N 30°4′32″E
- Country: Turkey
- Province: Afyonkarahisar
- District: Başmakçı
- Population (2021): 290
- Time zone: UTC+3 (TRT)

Ovacık is a village in the Başmakçı District, Afyonkarahisar Province, Turkey. Its population is 290 (2021). It is located southeast of the district capital of Başmakçı and east of Yassıören.
