= Yukarıyenice, Dazkırı =

Yukarıyenice
- Village
- Location within Turkey Location within Turkey Aegean
- Coordinates: 37.9097°N 29.8490°E
- Country: Turkey
- Province: Afyonkarahisar
- District: Dazkırı
- Population (2021): 319
- Time zone: UTC+3 (TRT)

Yukarıyenice is a village in the Dazkırı District, Afyonkarahisar Province, Turkey. Its population is 319 (2021).
