= Lake Acıgöl =

Lake in the Aegean Region of Turkey

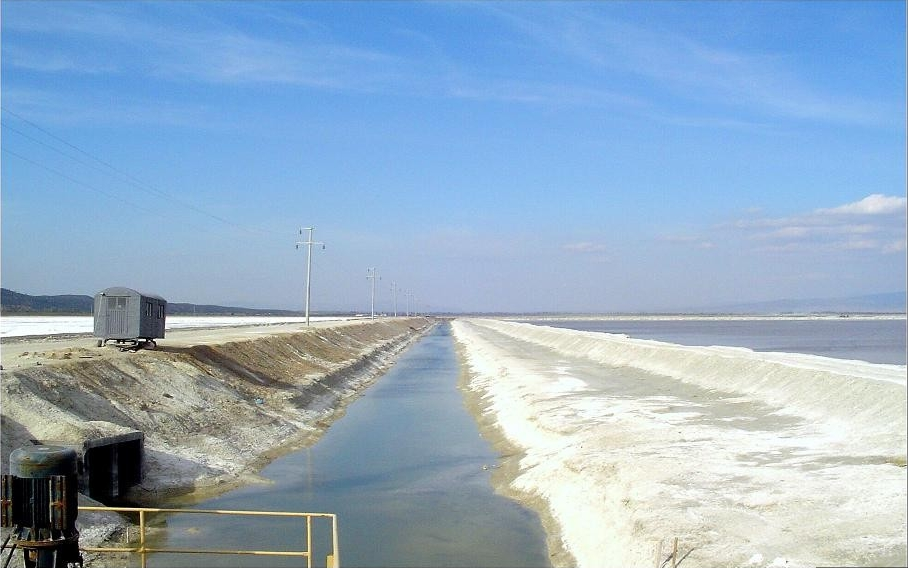

- Location within Turkey
- Location: Aegean Region
- Coordinates: 37°49′N 29°53′E
- Type: endorheic
- Basin countries: Turkey
- Surface area: 100 km^{2} (39 sq mi) (spring); 35 km^{2} (14 sq mi) (late summer)
- Surface elevation: 836 m (2,743 ft)

Acıgöl (literally "the bitter lake" in Turkish) is a lake in Turkey's inner Aegean Region, in an endorheic basin at the junction between the provinces of Denizli, Afyonkarahisar, and Burdur. Its surface area varies greatly through the seasons, from 100 km^{2} (39 mi^{2}) in spring to 35 km^{2} (14 mi^{2}) in late summer. The lake has a maximum depth of 1.63 m (5.3 ft), with the surface elevation 836 m (2,743 ft) above sea level. It is notable for its reserves of sodium sulfate, used extensively in industry, and it is the site of Turkey's largest commercial sodium sulfate production operation. The lake lies 60 km (37 mi) east of Denizli city. From west to east, the lake's surrounding districts and towns are Bozkurt, Çardak, Dazkırı and Başmakçı.

The lake is fed primarily by high-sulfate springs issuing from a fault line on its south side. The lake is estimated to contain 12.5 million metric tons (12.3×10^{6} long tons) of sodium sulfate on the surface and in the subsurface brine, with probable total reserves of 70 million metric tons (69×10^{6} long tons) and possible reserves of 82 million metric tons (81×10^{6} long tons). The yearly production rate in the late 1990s was 100,000 t (98,000 long tons), all from private sector companies.

The ancient Greeks called the lake Anaua (Greek: Ἄναυα), and the ancient town near the lake was named Anaua. Historians think that the lake Ascania (Ἀσκανία) mentioned by Arrian is also the same lake.

== Sources ==
- Garrett, Donald E. (2001). Sodium Sulfate: Handbook of Deposits, Processing, and Use. Elsevier. pp. 128–131. ISBN 0-12-276151-0.
- Long, George (1854), "Anaua", in Smith, William (ed.), Dictionary of Greek and Roman Geography, p. 131
