= Arıköy, Dazkırı =

Arıköy
- Village
- Location within Turkey Location within Turkey Aegean
- Coordinates: 37.9684°N 29.9393°E
- Country: Turkey
- Province: Afyonkarahisar
- District: Dazkırı
- Population (2021): 265
- Time zone: UTC+3 (TRT)

Arıköy is a village in the Dazkırı District, Afyonkarahisar Province, Turkey. Its population is 265 (2021).
