= Küllüce, Başmakçı =

Küllüce
- Village
- Location within Turkey Location within Turkey Aegean
- Coordinates: 37°58′4″N 29°58′40″E
- Country: Turkey
- Province: Afyonkarahisar
- District: Başmakçı
- Population (2021): 191
- Time zone: UTC+3 (TRT)

Küllüce is a village in the Başmakçı District, Afyonkarahisar Province, Turkey. Its population is 191 (2021).
