= Akarca, Dazkırı =

Akarca
- Village
- Location within Turkey Location within Turkey Aegean
- Coordinates: 37.9667°N 29.8667°E
- Country: Turkey
- Province: Afyonkarahisar
- District: Dazkırı
- Population (2021): 174
- Time zone: UTC+3 (TRT)

Akarca is a village in the Dazkırı District, Afyonkarahisar Province, Turkey. Its population is 174 (2021).
