= Çardak =

Place in Denizli, Turkey

- District and municipality
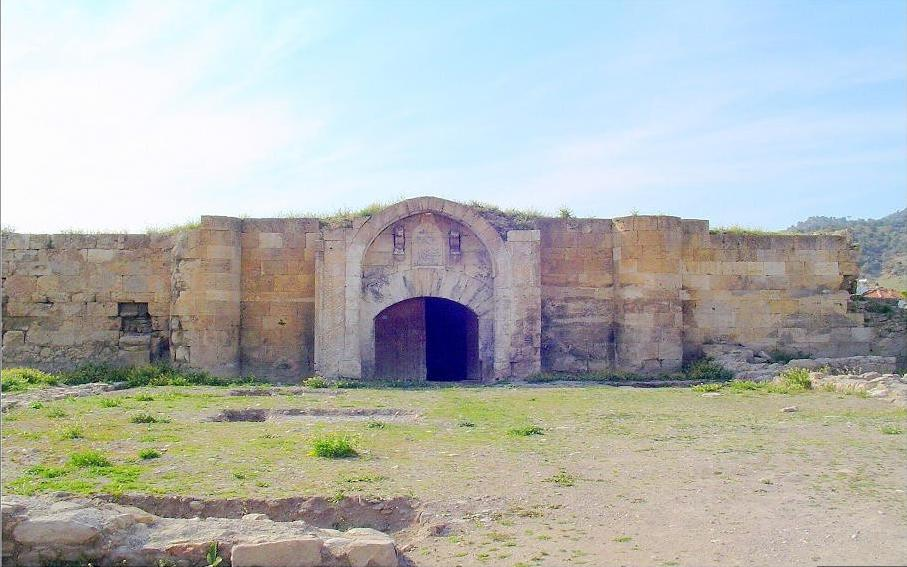
- Hanabad Caravanserai

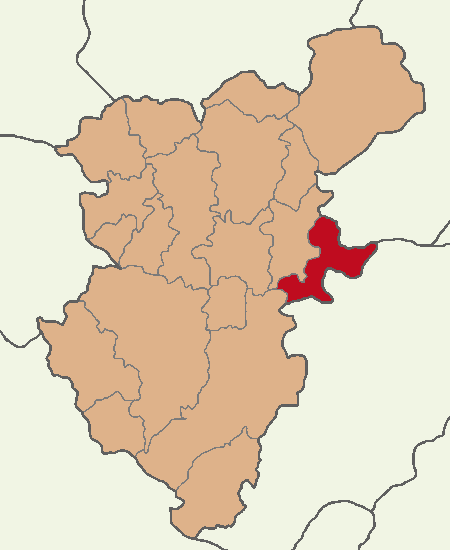
- Map showing Çardak District in Denizli Province

- Location within Turkey Location within Turkey Aegean
- Coordinates: 37°49′29″N 29°40′34″E
- Country: Turkey
- Province: Denizli

Government
  - Mayor: Ali Altiner (CHP)
- Area: 423 km^{2} (163 sq mi)
- Population (2022): 8,452
  - Density: 20.0/km^{2} (51.8/sq mi)
- Time zone: UTC+3 (TRT)
- Postal code: 20350
- Area code: 0258
- Website: www.cardak.bel.tr

Çardak is a municipality and district of Denizli Province, Turkey. Its area is 423 km^{2}, and its population is 8,452 (2022). It is situated on the road from Denizli to Ankara near the banks of the Lake Acıgöl.

Denizli's airport (Çardak Airport) is in Çardak.

A very notable sight in the town is the caravanserai of Hanabad, built in the 13th century by the local ruler Esedüddin Ayaz during the reign of Seljuk sultan Alaeddin Keykubad I. It bears typical characteristics of Seljuk caravanserais and on its stones are carved fish, cow and human relics.

A small village until the early years of the Turkish Republic, Çardak started growing as of 1958 when it was made into a district. Streets and buildings are well arranged and it is a tidy little town.

The economy is based on agriculture, and surface mining of sodium sulfate reserves in Lake Acıgöl whose name means "the bitter lake". Services rendered to the airport are also taking an increasingly important share in the town's economy. Hanabad Caravanserai is being restored.

== Composition ==
There are 15 neighbourhoods in Çardak District:

- Ayvaz
- Bahçelievler
- Beylerli
- Çaltı
- Çınar
- Cumhuriyet
- Gemişli
- Gemişpınarı
- Gölcük
- Hayriye
- Hürriyet
- İstiklal
- Saray
- Söğütlü
- Söğütözü

== See also ==
- Çardak Airport
- Lake Acıgöl
