= Henabad-e Sofla =

Henabad-e Sofla هناابادسفلي
- Village
- Location within Iran
- Coordinates: 38°41′44″N 47°14′19″E
- Country: Iran
- Province: East Azerbaijan
- County: Kaleybar
- Bakhsh: Central
- Rural District: Peyghan Chayi

Population (2006)
  - Total: 139
- Time zone: UTC+3:30 (IRST)
  - Summer (DST): UTC+4:30 (IRDT)

Henabad-e Sofla (Persian: هناابادسفلي, also Romanized as Henābād-e Soflá and Hanābād-e Soflá; also known as Haneh Abad Sofla, Hīnābād-e Pā’īn, Hīnābād Pā’īn, and Hīnābād Soflá) is a village in Peyghan Chayi Rural District, in the Central District of Kaleybar County, East Azerbaijan Province, Iran. At the 2006 census, its population was 139, in 30 families.
