= Hisaralan, Dazkırı =

Hisaralan
- Village
- Location within Turkey Location within Turkey Aegean
- Coordinates: 37.9715°N 29.7010°E
- Country: Turkey
- Province: Afyonkarahisar
- District: Dazkırı
- Population (2021): 81
- Time zone: UTC+3 (TRT)

Hisaralan is a village in the Dazkırı District, Afyonkarahisar Province, Turkey. Its population is 81 (2021).
