= Söğüt Dam =

- Location: Turkey
- Coordinates: 39.4236°N 30.1914°E

Söğüt Dam is a dam in Kütahya Province, Turkey, built between 1980 and 1983. The development was backed by the Turkish State Hydraulic Works.

== See also ==
- List of dams and reservoirs in Turkey
