= Sarıkavak, Dazkırı =

Sarıkavak
- Village
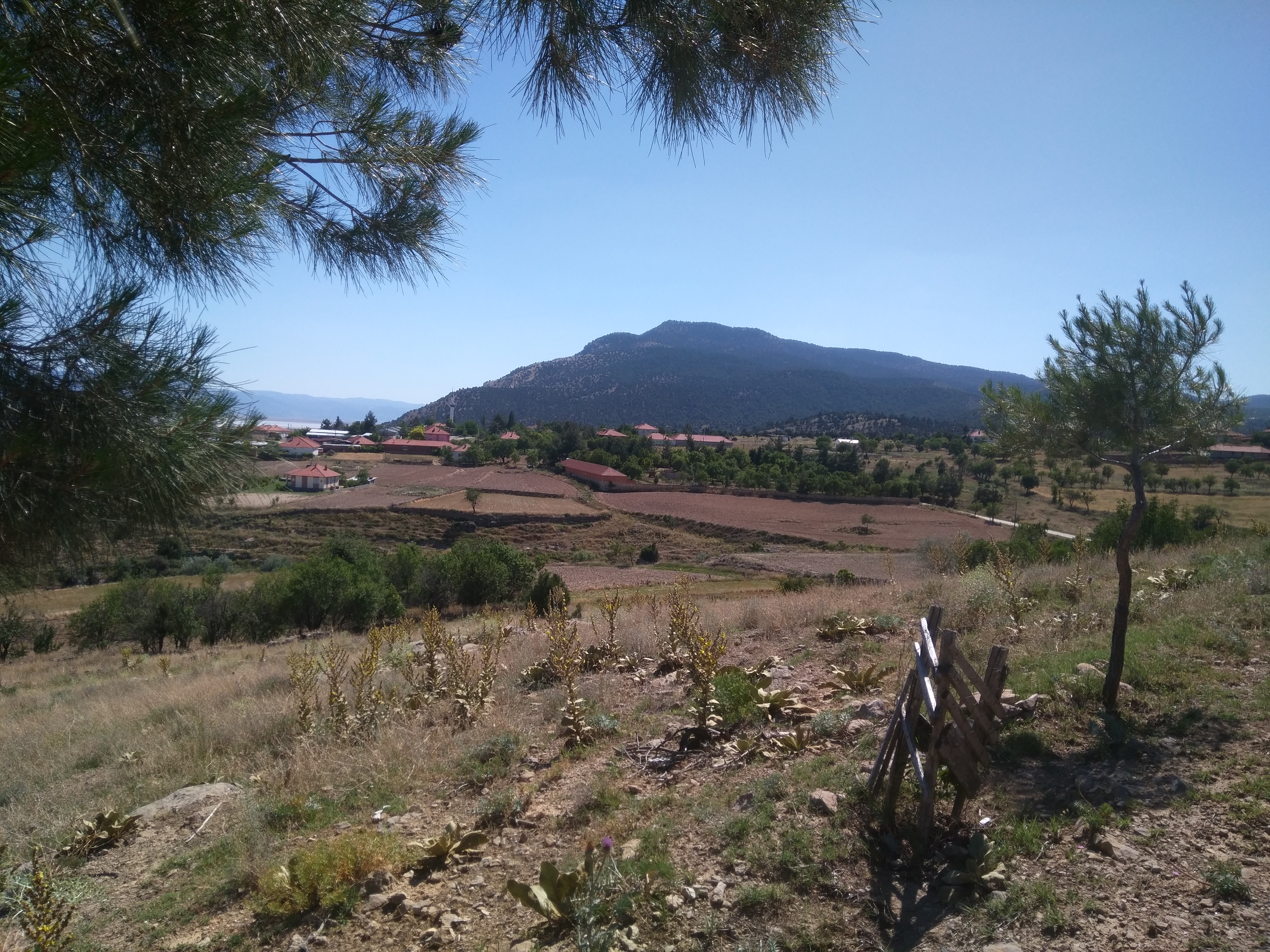
- Sarıkavak, with Mount Maymun in the background

- Location within Turkey Location within Turkey Aegean
- Coordinates: 37.8872°N 29.8125°E
- Country: Turkey
- Province: Afyonkarahisar
- District: Dazkırı
- Population (2021): 170
- Time zone: UTC+3 (TRT)

Sarıkavak is a village in the Dazkırı District, Afyonkarahisar Province, Turkey. Its population is 170 (2021).
