= Henabad-e Olya =

Henabad-e Olya هناابادعليا
- Village
- Location within Iran
- Coordinates: 38°42′01″N 47°13′00″E
- Country: Iran
- Province: East Azerbaijan
- County: Kaleybar
- Bakhsh: Central
- Rural District: Peyghan Chayi

Population (2006)
  - Total: 102
- Time zone: UTC+3:30 (IRST)
  - Summer (DST): UTC+4:30 (IRDT)

Henabad-e Olya (Persian: هناابادعليا, also Romanized as Henābād-e ‘Olyā and Hanābād-e ‘Olyā; also known as Haneh Abad Olyā, Hīnābād Bālā, and Hīnābād-e Bālā) is a village in Peyghan Chayi Rural District, in the Central District of Kaleybar County, East Azerbaijan Province, Iran. At the 2006 census, its population was 102, in 23 families.
