= Hırkaköy =

- Village
- Location within Turkey Location within Turkey Aegean
- Coordinates: 37°58′44″N 30°0′0″E
- Country: Turkey
- Province: Afyonkarahisar
- District: Başmakçı
- Population (2021): 157
- Time zone: UTC+3 (TRT)

Hırkaköy is a village in the Başmakçı District, Afyonkarahisar Province, Turkey. Its population is 157 (2021).
