= Dazkırı =

Town in Afyonkarahisar, Turkey

- Municipality
- Location within Turkey Location within Turkey Aegean
- Coordinates: 37°55′N 29°52′E
- Country: Turkey
- Province: Afyonkarahisar
- District: Dazkırı

Government
  - Mayor: Fatih Çiçek (AKP)
- Population (2021): 5,640
- Time zone: UTC+3 (TRT)
- Climate: Csa
- Website: www.dazkiri.bel.tr

Dazkırı is a town of Afyonkarahisar Province in the Aegean region of Turkey, 140 km from the city of Afyon on the road to Denizli. It is the seat of Dazkırı District. Its population is 5,640 (2021). The climate in the district is hot and dry in summer, and cold and wet in winter. The former mayor is İsmail Taylan (CHP). He was replaced by Fatih Çiçek from AKP in the local election on 31 March 2024.

== Economy ==
Dazkırı and Başmakçı are 10 km away from each other and livestock business is significantly important income for the region. It is estimated that there are approximately 500 family-run chicken farms and business companies in the area.

Dazkırı is also known for its hand-woven carpets.

== Notable natives ==
- Aykut Oray, film actor
