= Denizli Province =

Province of Turkey

Denizli Province Denizli ili
- Province and metropolitan municipality
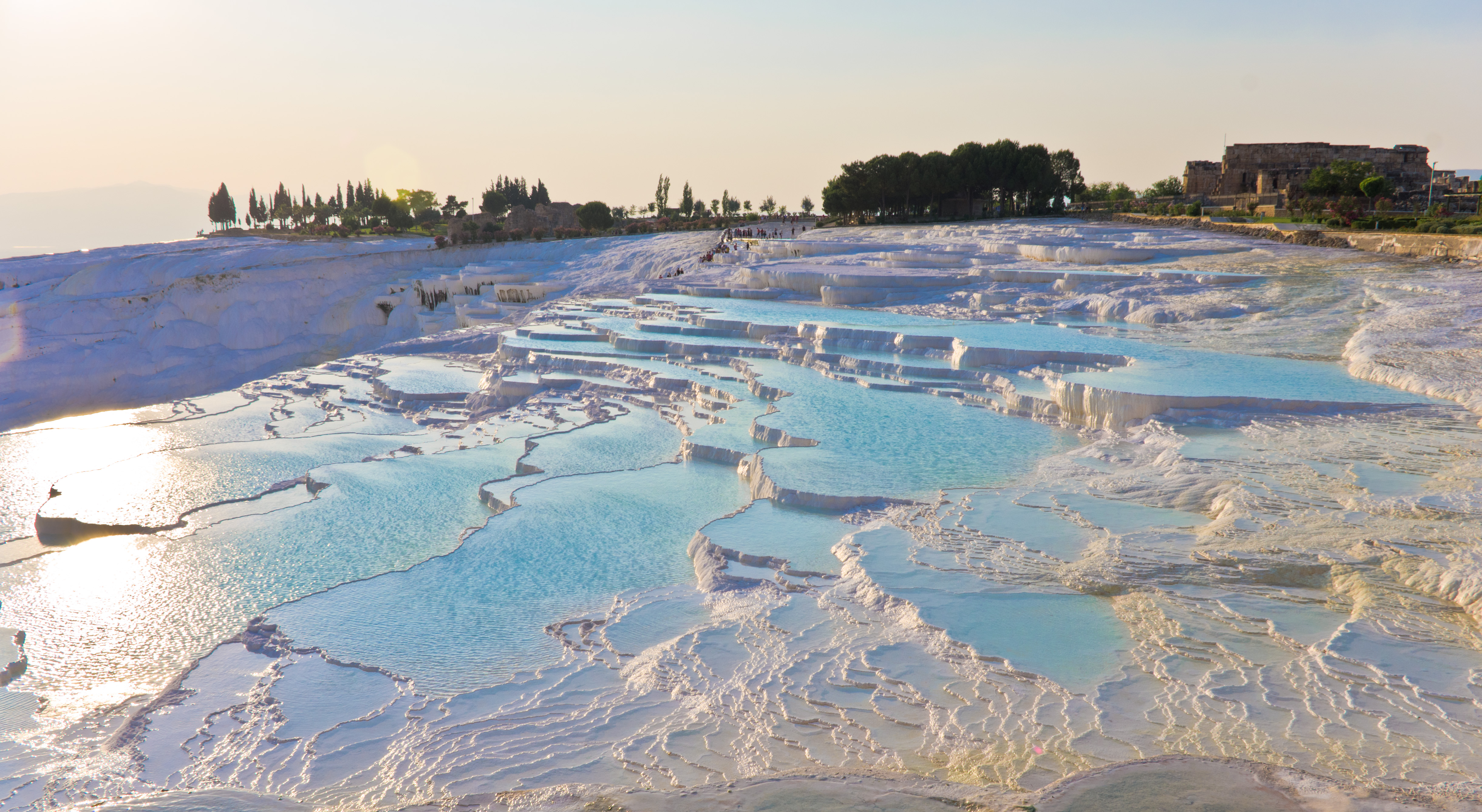
- Pamukkale

- Location of the province within Turkey
- Coordinates: 37°44′36″N 29°17′29″E
- Country: Turkey
- Seat: Denizli

Government
  - Mayor: Bülent Nuri Çavuşoğlu (CHP)
  - Vali: Yavuz Selim Köşger
- Area: 12,134 km^{2} (4,685 sq mi)
- Population (2022): 1,056,332
  - Density: 87.056/km^{2} (225.47/sq mi)
- Time zone: UTC+3 (TRT)
- Area code: 0258
- ISO 3166 code: TR-20
- Website: www.denizli.bel.tr; www.denizli.gov.tr

Denizli Province (Turkish: Denizli ili) (Turkish pronunciation: [deniz'ʎi iʎi]) is a province and metropolitan municipality of Turkey in Western Anatolia, on high ground above the Aegean coast. Neighbouring provinces are Uşak to the north, Burdur, Isparta, Afyon to the east, Aydın, Manisa to the west and Muğla to the south. It is located between the coordinates 28° 30’ and 29° 30’ E and 37° 12’ and 38° 12’ N. Its area is 12,134 km^{2}, and its population is 1,056,332 (2022). The provincial capital is the city of Denizli.

== History ==
=== Antiquity ===
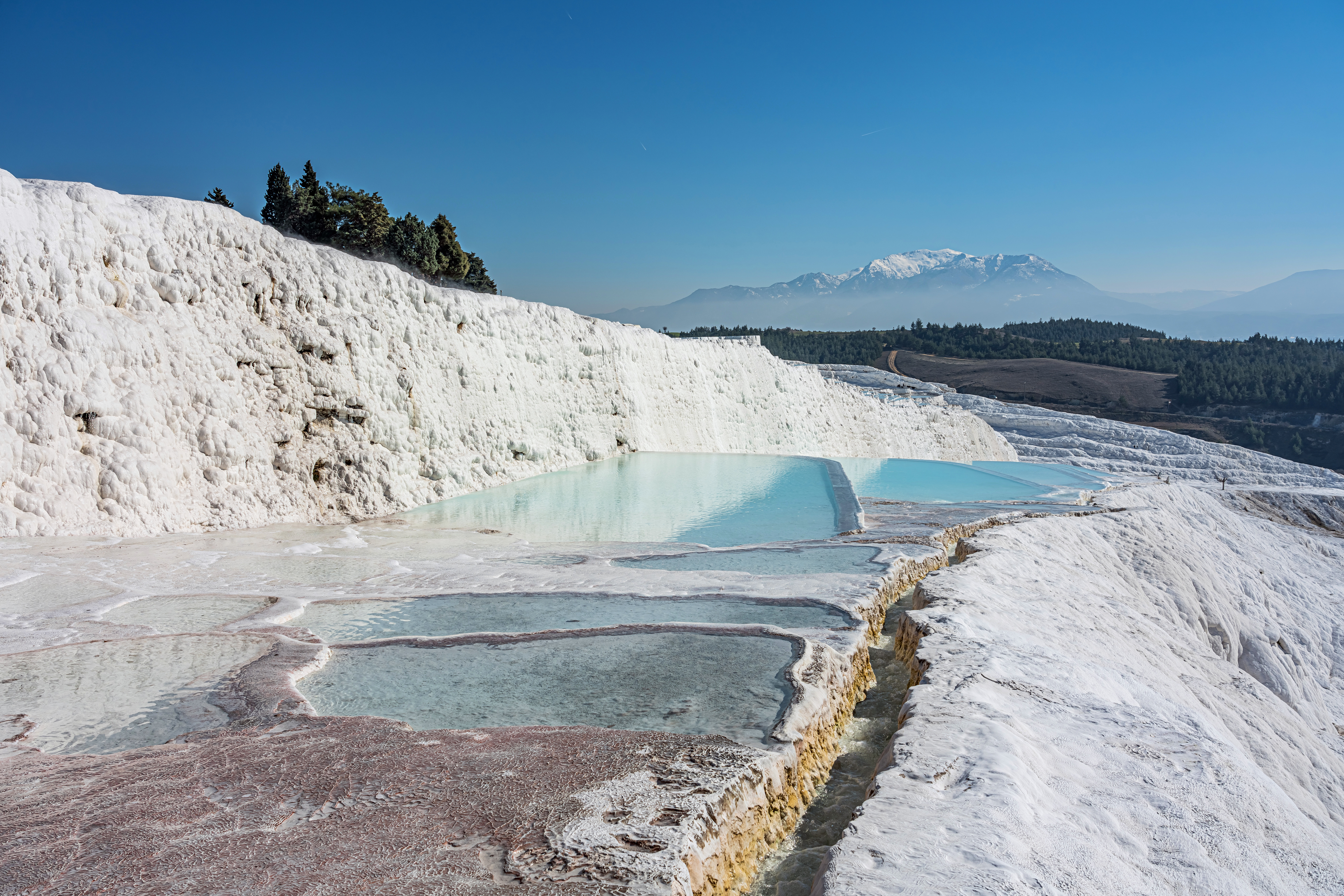
Pamukkale below the ruins of Hierapolis

There are traces of prehistoric cultures throughout the province, including evidence of pre-Hittite cultures and the Hittites themselves. The Hittites were followed by Phrygians, Lydians and Persians, and then cities founded by the ancient Greeks and Alexander the Great. The first real settlement was the city of Laodicea on the Lycus which was established by King Antiochus II for his wife Laodice. Laodicea is located 6 km north of the city of Denizli. The city of Hierapolis was established around 190 BC by the Pergamene Kingdom, one of the Hellenistic states of Anatolia. The calcified terraces and pools of Pamukkale (Cotton Castle) now stand below the ruins of Hierapolis. The two cities, Laodicea and Hierapolis later came under Roman rule, and with the division of the Empire in 395 were left within the boundaries of the East Roman Empire.

=== Christian era ===
The province has strong biblical connections: in the Book of Revelation, John the Evangelist hears a loud voice which sounded like a trumpet when he was on the island of Patmos. The voice says: "Write down what you see and send the book to the Churches in these seven cities: Ephesus, Smyrna, Pergamum, Thyatira, Sardis, Philadelphia and Laodicea". The Church of Laodicea was a sacred place even in pre-Christian times, and is still visited by Christians today, although it lost its importance to a great extent during Byzantine rule.

=== Turkish era ===
Turks were first seen in Denizli in 1070 when Afşin Bey, under the control of the Seljuk Sultan Alp Arslan, raided the area. The second and third Crusades fought here against the Seljuk Turks under the command of Kazıkbeli, who managed to flee with a small force to Antalya which was also captured by the Crusaders. Later, after the Turks had established control of the ancient cities, they moved south to the site of the present city of Denizli, where drinking water was brought through stone pipes. The name Laodicea slowly changed into “Ladik” then other names were given "Tonguzlu", "Tonuzlu", "Tenguzlug", "Donuzlu" and finally "Denizli". After World War I, when the Greek Army captured the city of İzmir on May 15, 1919, one of the first centres of Turkish resistance formed at an open-air meeting in Denizli. A Turkish militia formed lines on the Menderes organized by Yörük Ali Efe and Demirci Efe, involving large numbers of volunteers from the local peasantry. Stiffened by the Turkish regular army, Greek forces were repelled, and Denizli remained in Turkish hands throughout the Greco-Turkish War.

== Geography ==
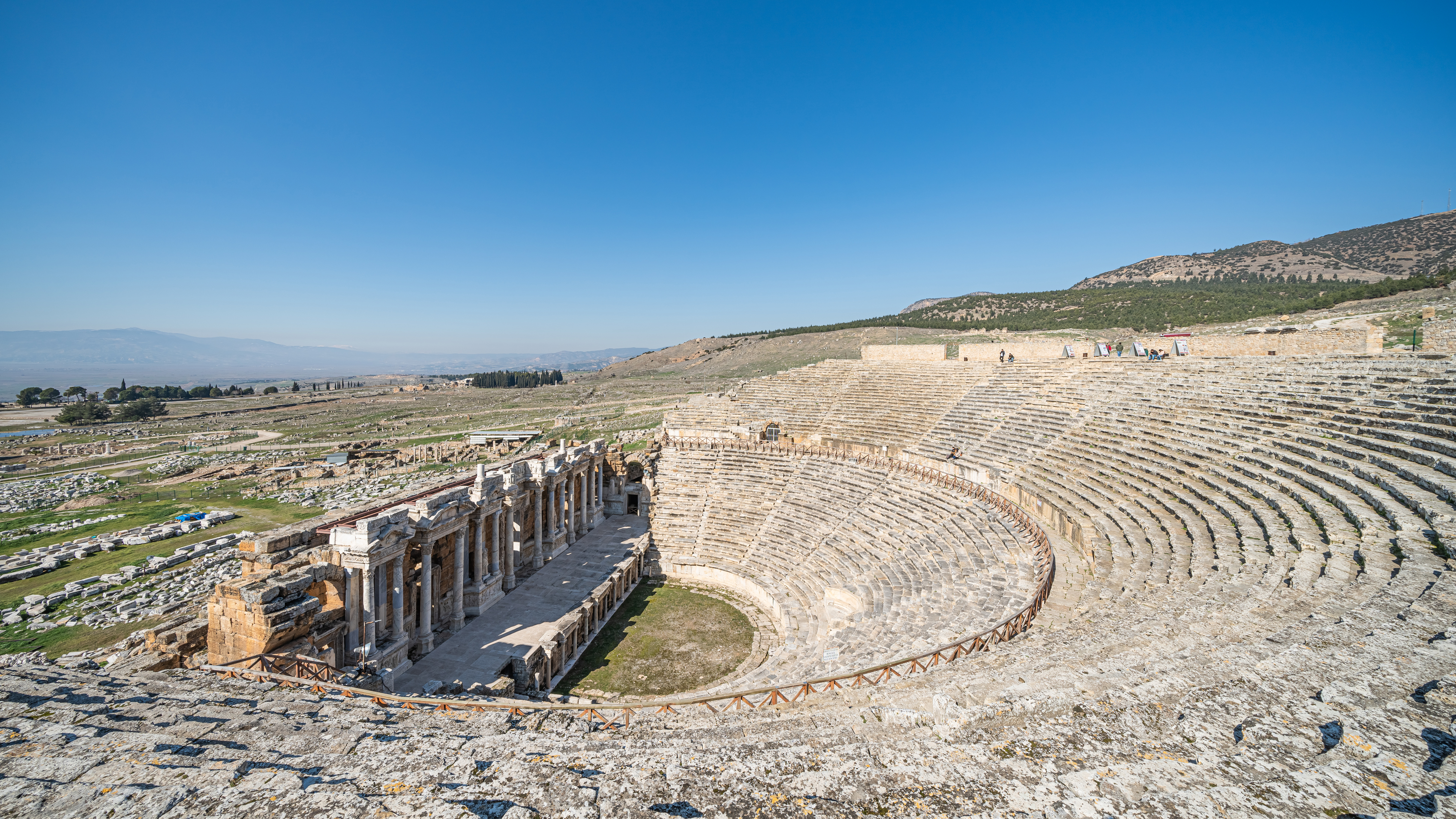
Hieropolis

Approximately 28–30% of the land is plain, 25% is high plateau and tableland, and 47% is mountainous. At 2,571 m (8,435 ft) Mount Honaz is the highest in the province, and indeed in Western Anatolia. Babadag in the Mentes range has a height of 2,308 m (7,572 ft). The biggest lake in Denizli is Acıgöl, which means "bitter lake", and indeed industrial salts (sodium sulphate) are extracted from this lake, which is highly alkaline. There is a thermal spring to the west of Sarayköy, at the source of the Great Menderes River, which contains bicarbonates and sulfates. There is another hot spring in Kızıldere which reaches 200 °C (392 °F). A geothermal steam source was first found in the region in 1965 during drilling work. Today there is a power plant producing electricity from the geothermal steam. Only 11% of the geothermal energy source is used to produce electricity and 89% of it, which flows into the Great Menderes, is 150 °C (302 °F) at source (it is contains energy equal to 35,000–40,000 t (35,000–40,000 t) of fuel oil).

=== Districts ===
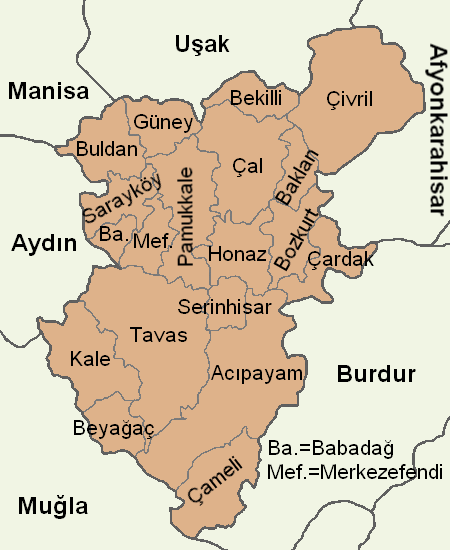
Denizli districts

List of districts of Denizli Province
District	Population (2022)
Acıpayam	54,888
Babadağ	6,340
Baklan	5,296
Bekilli	6,424
Beyağaç	6,197
Bozkurt	12,331
Buldan	26,630
Çal	17,889
Çameli	17,549
Çardak	8,452
Çivril	59,967
Güney	9,448
Honaz	34,074
Kale	19,202
Merkezefendi	336,818
Pamukkale	347,926
Sarayköy	30,834
Serinhisar	14,355
Tavas	41,712
Grand total	1,056,332

=== Climate ===
In general the Aegean region has a Mediterranean climate. Temperatures can rise to 40 °C (104 °F) during summer and fall to −5 °C (23 °F) in winter. There are about 80 days with precipitation, mainly during winter.

== Places of interest ==
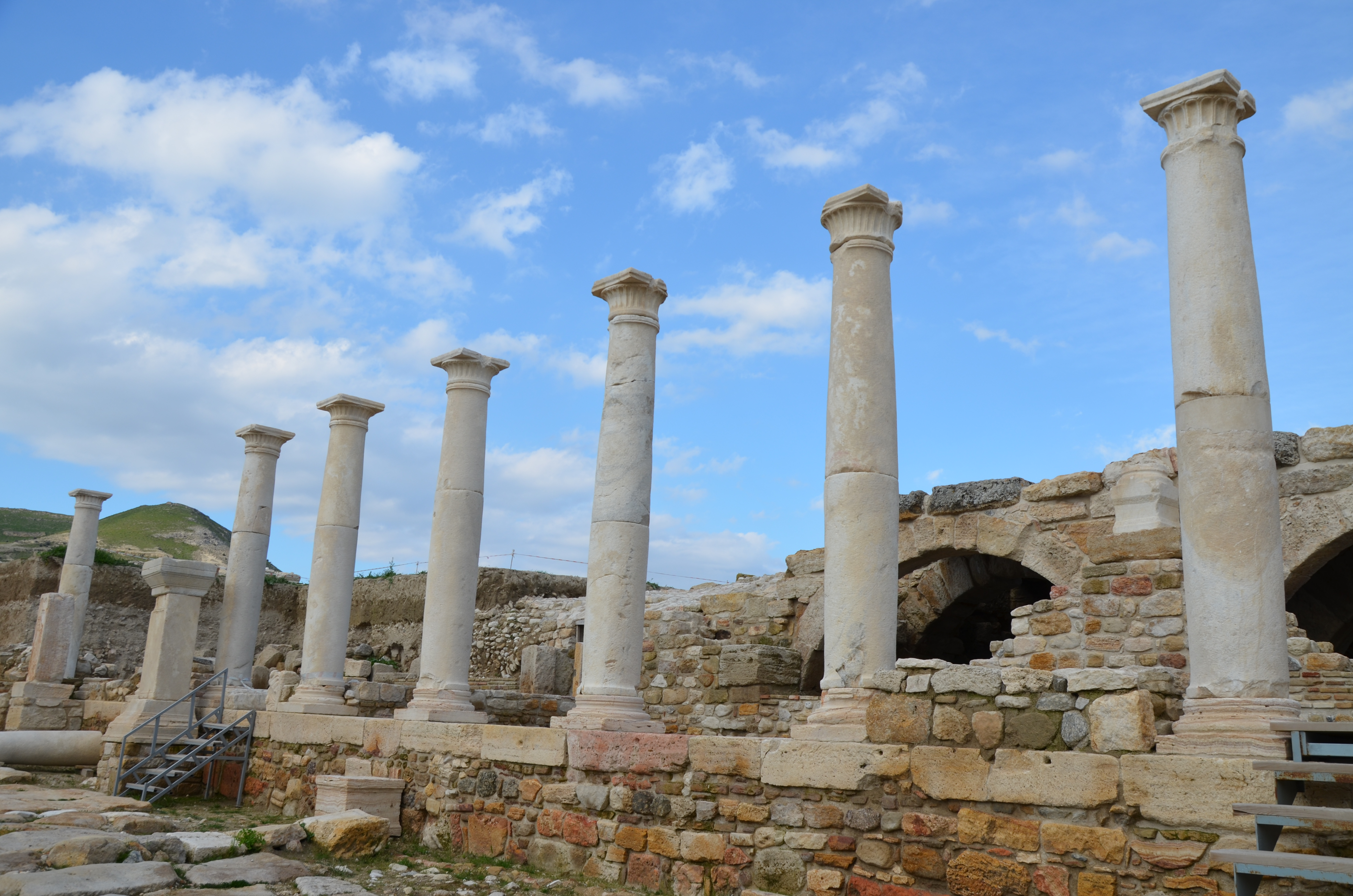
Ruins of Tripolis of Phrygia near Yenicekent

Near Denizli city:

- Laodicea ad Lycum—Ruins of the ancient city located north of Denizli, about 1 km (0.62 mi) north of the village of Eskihisar.
- Hierapolis and Pamukkale—20 km (12 mi) north of Denizli. The ruins of the ancient city and the hillside covered in minerals from the thermal waters.
- The Seljuk caravanserai Akhan, 26 km (16 mi) from Denizli on the Ankara highway.

Near the other districts in the province:

- Tripolis (Phrygia) near the village of Yenicekent in Buldan—ruins of a city dating back to the Hellenistic period.
- A few remains of the ancient city of Colossae, in Honaz.
- Beycehöyük in Çivril, where several antiquities of the Copper Age dating back to 3000 BC were found.
- The Hanabat Caravanserai in Çardak is a typical Seljuk caravanserai.
- The Ahmetli Bridge over the Great Menderes river, 15 km (9.3 mi) from Sarayköy, dates back to the Roman era.

== Denizli rooster ==
Denizli is renowned in Turkey for having a famous breed of cock, renowned for its appearance and colour, along with its prolonged and melodious crows. Great effort is taken by the state and local farmers to preserve the breed. In appearance the Denizli cock has black eyes, dark grey legs, a long neck, and a red crown. It weighs 3–3.5 kg (6.6–7.7 lb), and has a distinctive crow.

== See also ==
- Kocabaş cranium
- List of populated places in Denizli Province
