= Kalathil Sree Rudra Devi Temple =

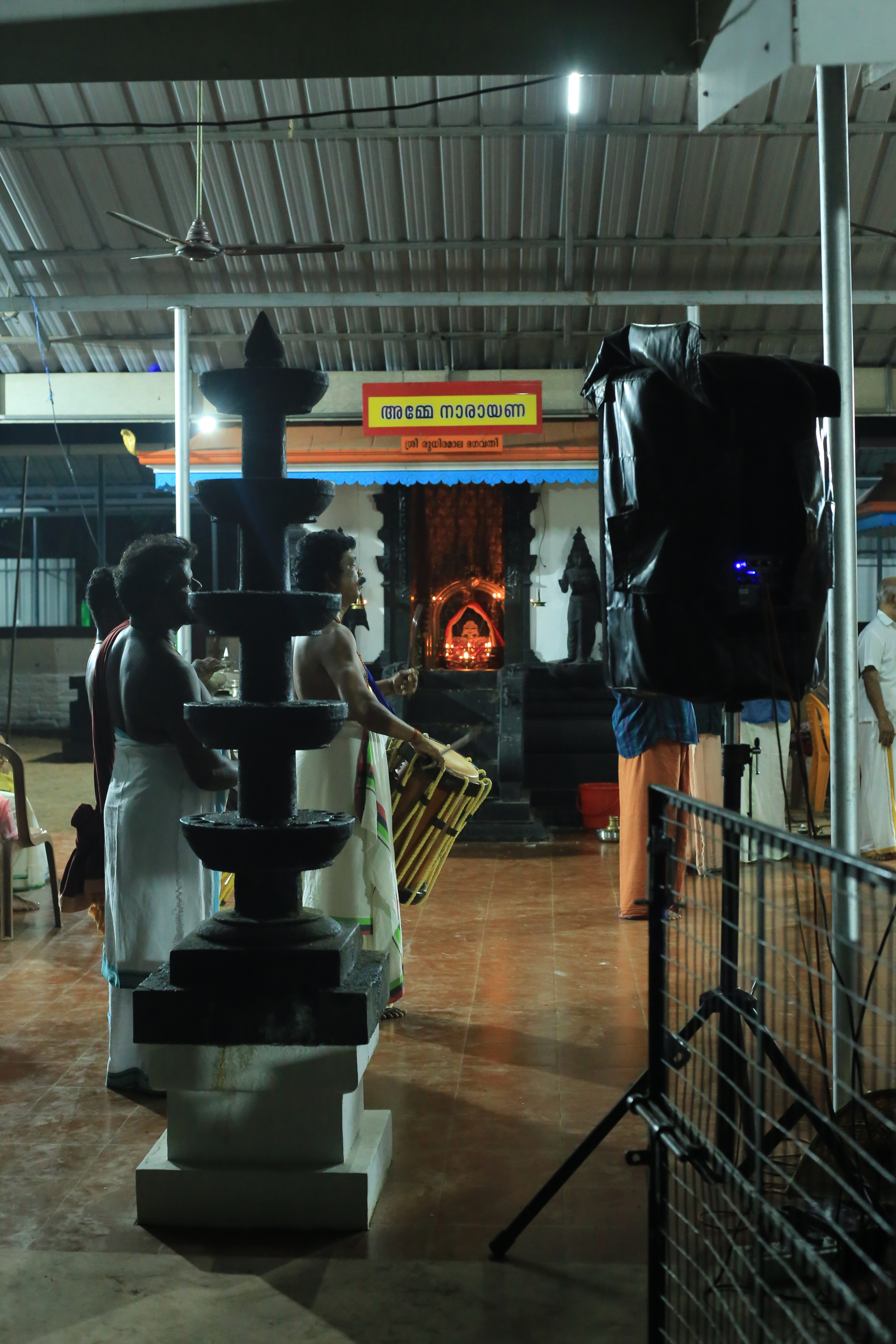

Religion
- Affiliation: Hinduism
- District: Thrissur
- Deity: Rudra Devi

Location
- Location: Manathala
- State: Kerala
- Country: India

Architecture
- Type: Kerala style

Kalathil Sree Rudra Devi Temple, known as Kalathil Sree Rudhiramala Bhagavathi Temple is located at east side of Manathala, near the bank of Conolly Canal in Chavakkad, Thrissur district, Kerala. It is unique in Kerala for featuring chithrakkoodakkallus to worship serpent deities.

== Legend ==
The temple was founded by the Kalathil family as the ancestral home of Kerala's Ezhava community in Chavakkad. The temple worships a brahmin woman who lived in the Kannathur village in the ancient city of Kannur and married into the Kalathil family.

== Deities ==
- Hanuman
- Vanadurga
- Muthappan
- Ghandakarnnan
- Virabhadra
- Kappiri
- Karimkutty
- Gulikan

There are two sarpa kavus here; Melekkaavu, exists behind of the temple and Keezhekkaavu, exists inside of the temple.

== In Literature ==
- Apadee Deepam(ആപദീ ദീപം), a poem about Kalathil Sree Rudra Devi Temple, written by Sathish Kalathil. Publisher, Malayala Manorama.
