= Sarp (disambiguation) =

SARP or Sarp may refer to:

- Sarp, French commune
- Sarp, Kemalpaşa, village in Turkey
- Sarp (musician), a Turkish rock musician
- Sarpsborg, a city in Norway
- Skinheads Against Racial Prejudice (more commonly abbreviated as SHARP)
- Standards And Recommended Practices, the technical specifications adopted by the Council of ICAO
- Association of Polish Architects, Polish architectural organization
- The Strong Axiom of Revealed Preferences

== People with the given name ==
- Sarp Akkaya (born 1980), Turkish actor

== People with the surname ==
- Mustafa Sarp, Turkish footballer

== See also ==
- Sarpa (disambiguation)
