= Chithrakkoodakkallu =

A chithrakkoodakkallu (also chithrakoodam, nagakkallu, or sarppakkallu) is a house for deity snakes or a devotional image (murti) of a serpent deity, used for snake worship. It is constructed with rocks. These consecrations can be seen at the sarpa kavus of some ancient, traditional Hindu families and temples throughout Kerala.

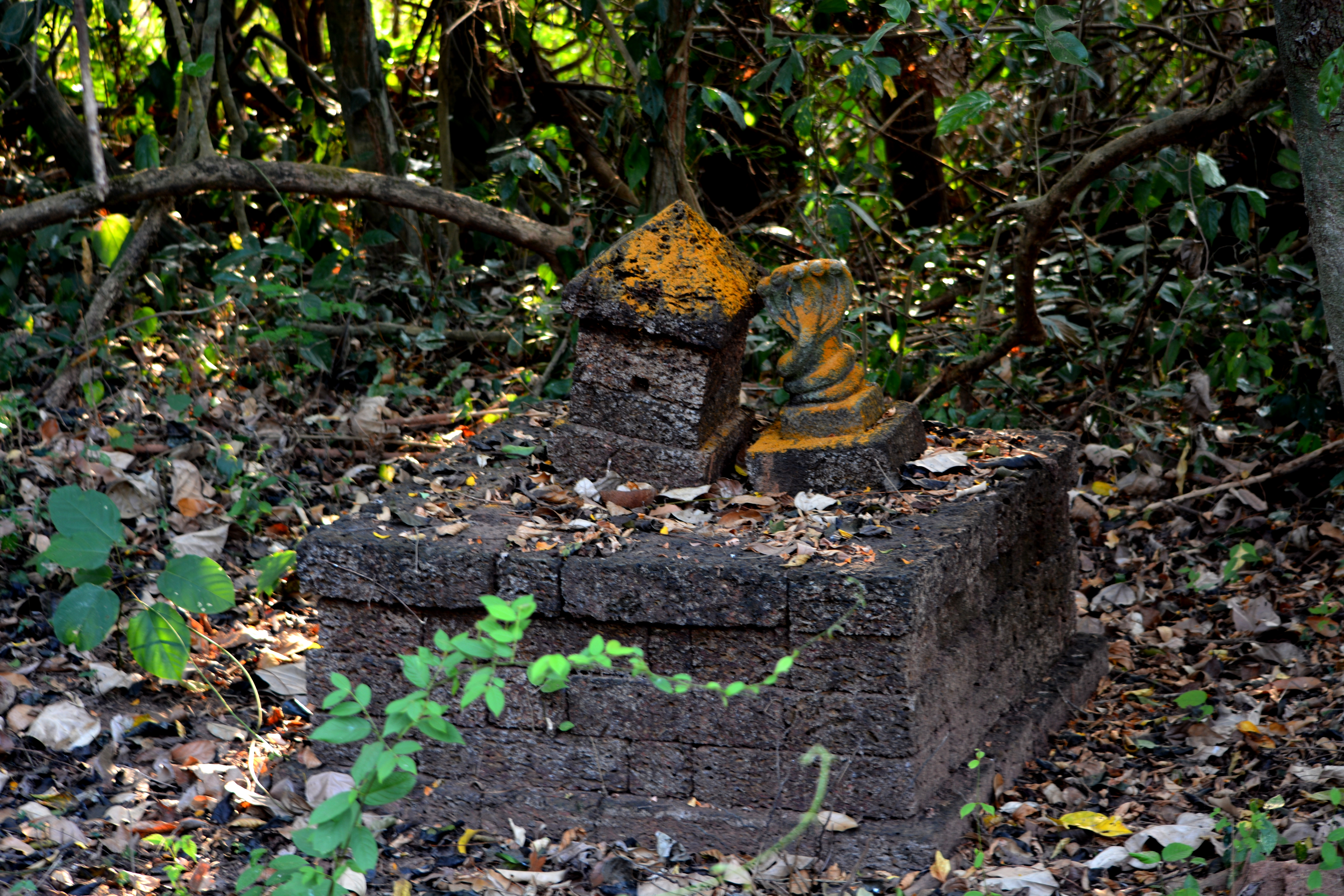
Sarpa kavu with a chithrakkoodakkallu (left), constructed with laterite

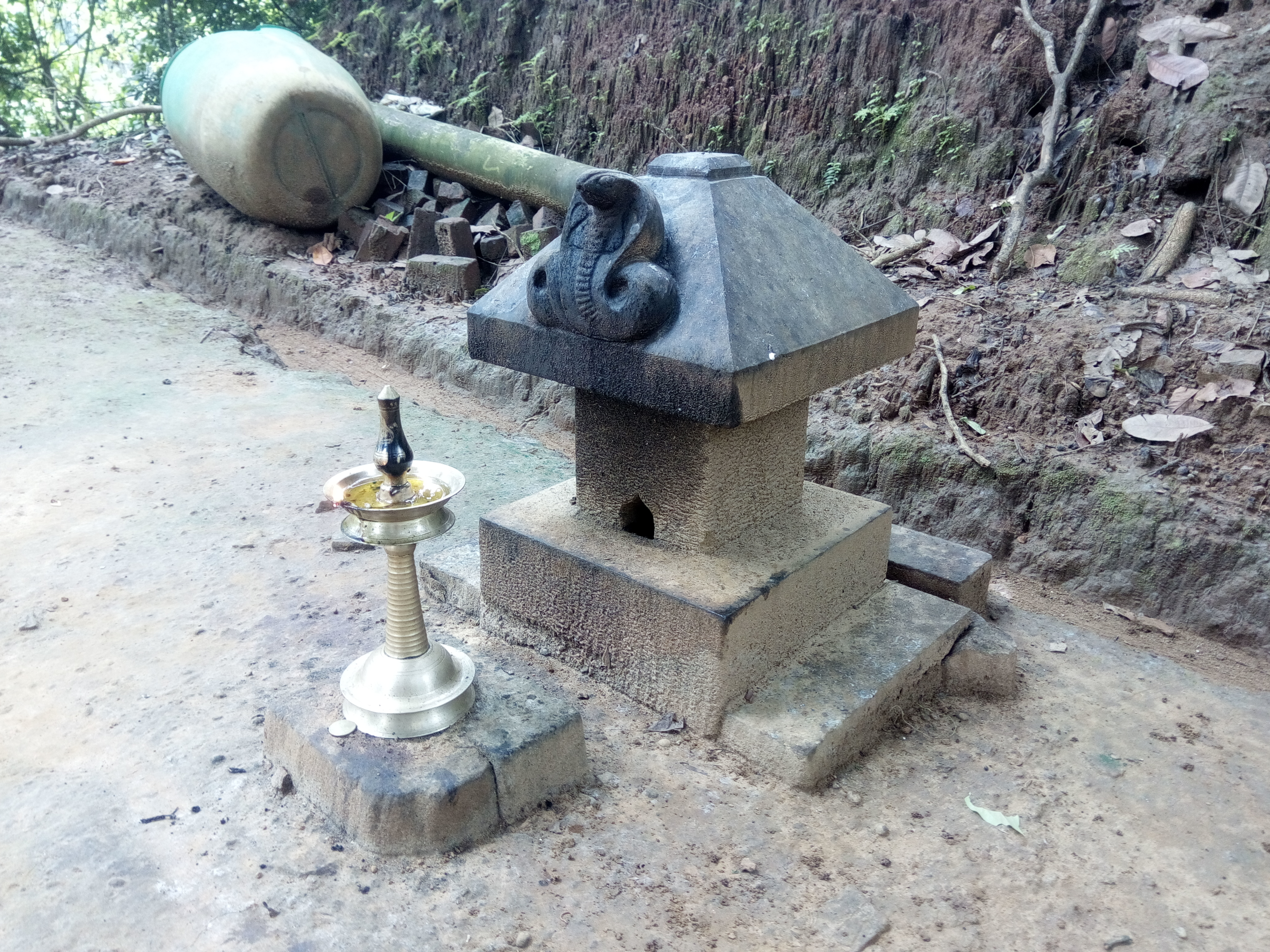
A chithrakkoodakkallu at Chemmanthittakkaavu Durga Bhagavathy Temple, constructed with granite

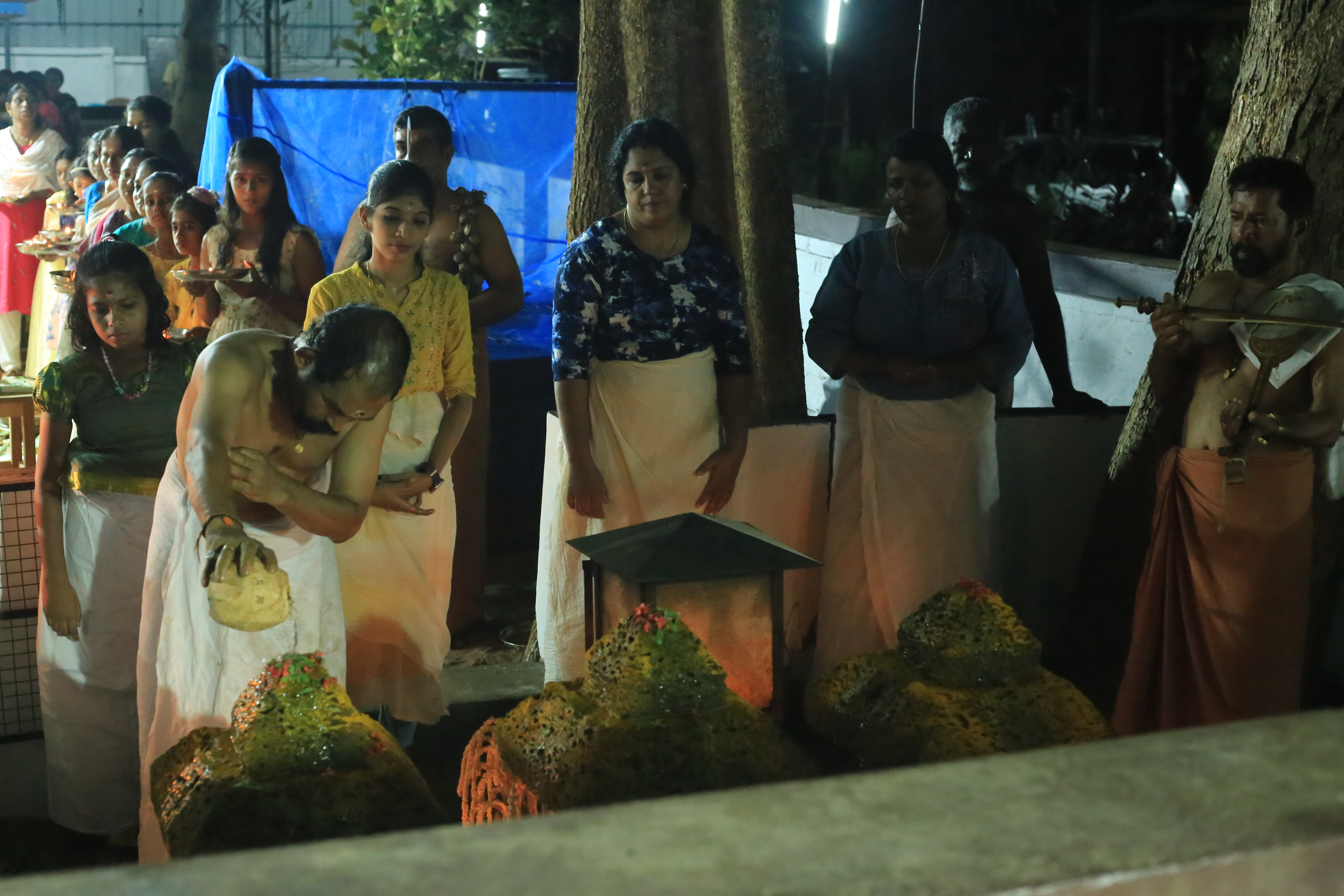
Snake worship in chithrakkoodakkallus constructed with laterite at Kalathil Sreerudra Devi Temple.

== Production ==
Chithrakkoodakkallus were constructed with laterite, according to Vastu Shastra (ancient Hindu architecture texts). Later, granite replaced laterite.

== Temples ==
Notable temples include:

- Sabarimala Temple
- Mannarasala Temple
- Vazhappally Maha Siva Temple
- Kalathil Sree Rudra Devi Temple
- Chemmanthittakkaavu Durga Bhagavathy Temple
- Mathoor Mana
- Kaladan Nagakkaavu, Chelambra
- Aamalatthukulangara Durga Devi Temple
