= Saarvajanika Nagabrahmastana Moodanidambooru, Bannanje =

Hindu temple in Moodanidambooru (Bannanje), Udupi, Karnataka, India

Saarvajanika Naga Brahmastana

- Location in Karnataka

Religion
- Affiliation: Hinduism
- Deity: Nagaraja, Nagayakshi & Nagakannika

Location
- Location: Udupi
- State: Karnataka
- Country: India
- Interactive map of Saarvajanika Naga Brahmastana
- Coordinates: 13°20′48″N 74°44′39″E

Saarvajanika Naga Brahmastana (Kannada/Tulu:ಸಾರ್ವಜನಿಕ ನಾಗ ಬ್ರಹ್ಮಸ್ಥಾನ) is an ancient Hindu temple, situated at Moodanidambooru (Bannanje) village of Udupi district in Karnataka.

It is one of the oldest Nagabana in Udupi for snake worship. Here Nagaraja, Nagayakshi & Nagakannika are worshipped together with Brahma, Raktheshwari, Nandikona, Kshetrapala and Bobbarya daiva.

== Puja activities ==
Ashlesha Bali Pooja, Sarpa Samskara, Durga Namaskara, Ranga Pooja & Deeparadhana Pooja are done at Naga Brahmastana.

Special rituals are performed during Nagara Panchami, Subrahmanya Shasti, Navarathri and on the day of Varshikotsava.

Daily Pooja is performed in the morning at 10.00am and special pooja is performed every Saturday.

== Gallery ==
Garbhagudi

== See also ==
- Vasuki
- Nāga
- Snake worship
- Nagaradhane
- Tulu Nadu
