= Sarpa =

The term Sarpa may refer to any of the following:

- Sarpa salpa—a monotypic species of sea bream (fish)
- SARPA—a charter airline
- Sarpa—the Sanskrit term for snake/serpent, from which is derived:
  - Sarpa (snakebite app) (Snake Awareness, Rescue and Protection app)
  - Sarpa Kavu, a Hindu sacred place in India
  - Sarpa Samskara or Sarpa Dosha, a Hindu rite (pooja) practised in the Kukke Subramanya Temple
  - Sarpa Satra, a legendary attempt to eliminate snakes
  - Sarpa Satra, a poem by Arun Kolatkar
  - Sarpam, an Indian film
- Sarpa Lake, Russia

== See also ==
- Sarp (disambiguation)
