= Panjurli =

Spirit deity in Tulu mythology

Panjurli is a daiva or spirit deity of the Dravdian folk Hinduism worshipped endemically in the Tulu Nadu region of coastal Karnataka and Northern Kerala, in India. Revered as a divine wild boar, Panjuruli is a central figure in Bhoota Kola, an ancient tradition of spirit worship. The deity symbolizes nature's guardianship, justice, and fertility, and is often invoked for communal protection, agricultural prosperity, and cultural continuity. Panjurli daiva is a mandatory daiva in all Tuluva families.

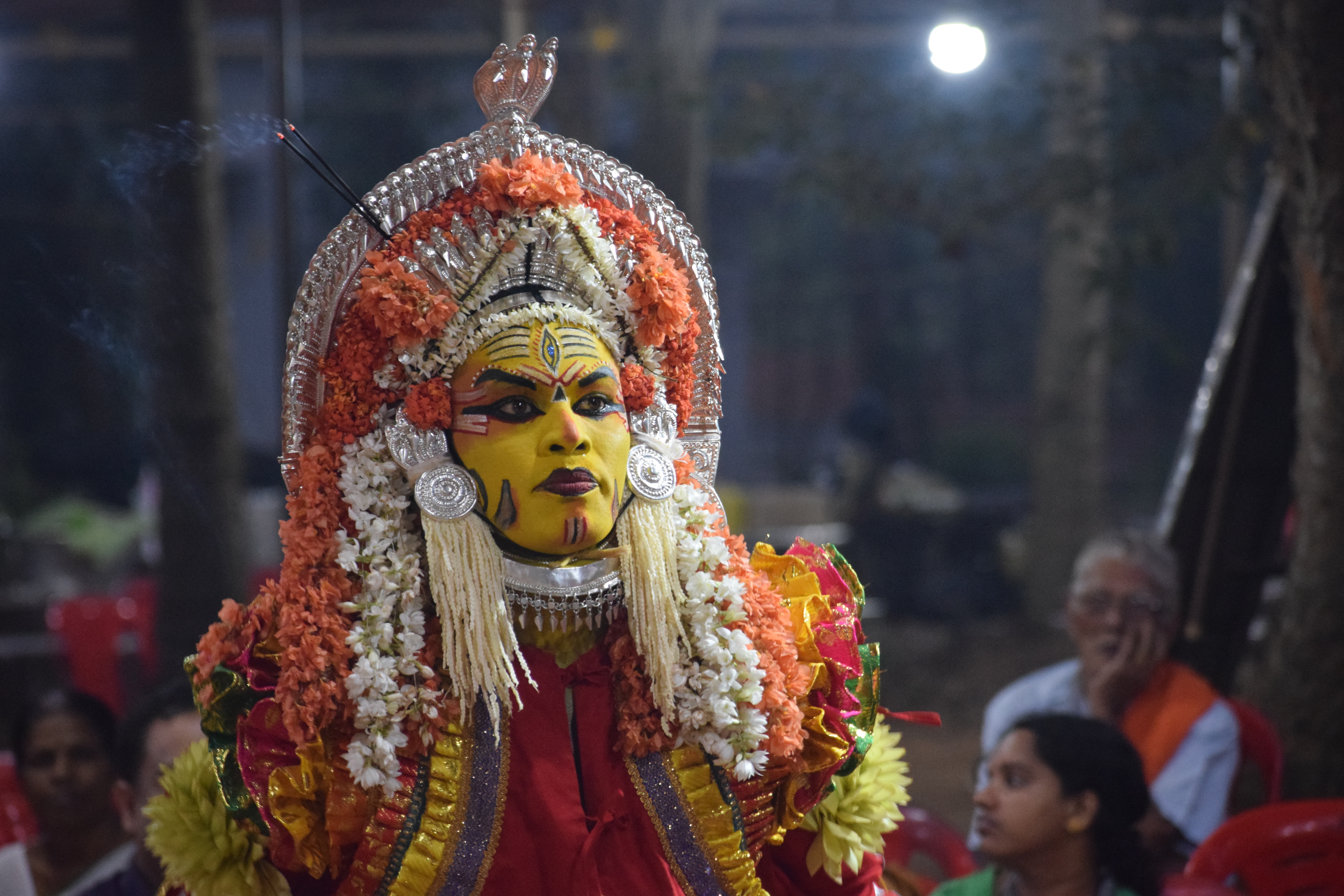
Panjurli daiva in Bootha Kola

== History ==
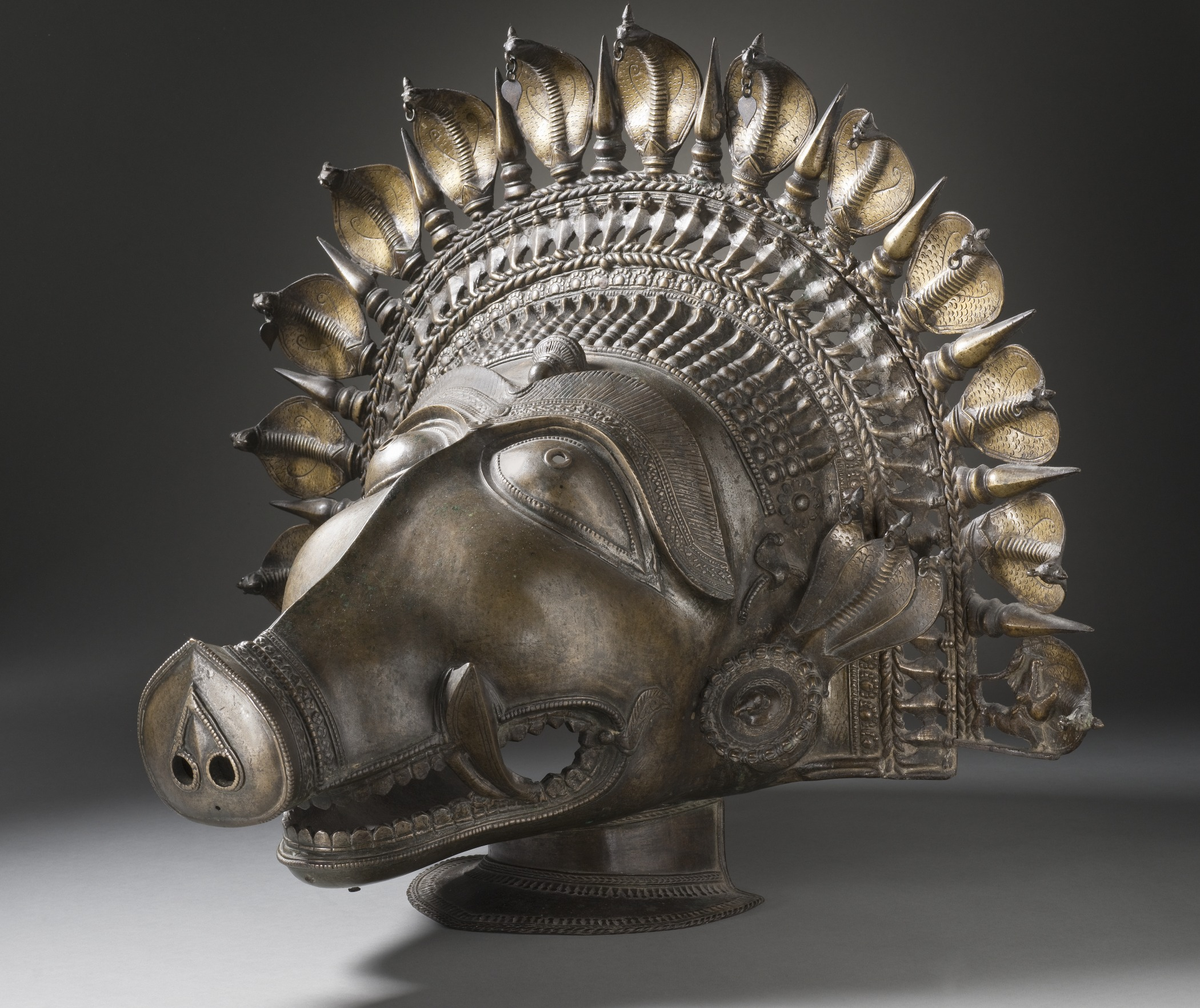
Dancer's headpiece in the form of (boar face deity) mostly belongs to Jumadi or Malaraya of Kasaragod region, LACMA 18th century CE

Panjuruli has been venerated in Tulu Nadu for over 5,000 years, with roots in the region's earliest forms of Bhoota Kola—a ritual spirit worship that predates mainstream Hindu practices. Panjuruli's legend and worship are distinct aspects of Tulu culture, separate from vedic traditions and representative of a unique regional identity. Traditionally, Panjuruli is seen as a guardian of forests and farmlands, invoked to bless the land and protect communities against harm.

The growth of Panjuruli's legend is intertwined with agrarian society's connection to nature and cycles of the land; the boar, respected both for its destructive power and protective presence, became central to local beliefs. The elaborate performances, dance, and trance rituals of Bhoota Kola continue to hold immense significance across castes and communities, reinforcing social harmony and spiritual guidance in modern times.

== Legend ==
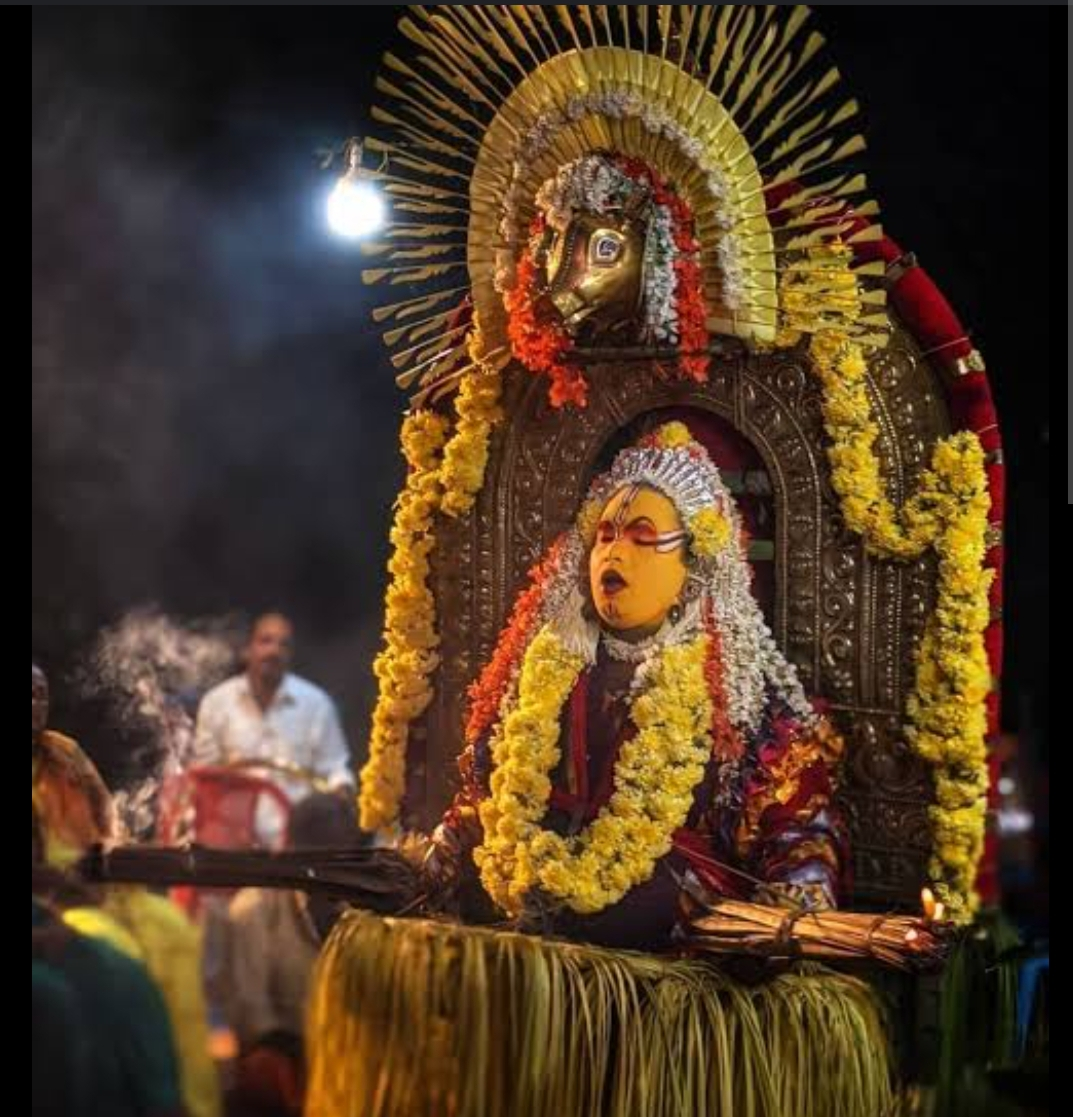

According to Tulunadu legend, Panjuruli was born of divine intervention connected to Mount Kailash. The primary legend recounts how, after a wild boar died at Kailash, the orphaned piglet was adopted by Goddess Parvati out of compassion. Lord Shiva, angered by the boar's aggressive behaviour, which destroyed the plants in his garden, exiled the boar to Earth. Blessed by Parvati, the piglet transformed into Panjuruli, taking on the role of protector of forests, crops, and those who respect the natural order.

Further tales describe Panjuruli as a gentle guardian, intervening to safeguard villages and uphold justice. The deity is always portrayed as benevolent—bestowing blessings on those who honor traditions and delivering retribution to those who harm the environment or violate social norms.

In ritual and folklore, Panjuruli is paired with the spirit Guliga, representing a cosmic balance: while Panjuruli embodies mercy, fertility, and care for nature, Guliga is the enforcer of justice and retribution, thus reinforcing the duality of protection and discipline in Tulu Nadu belief systems.

== Worship ==
The worship of Panjuruli is realized through vibrant annual festivals and community gatherings, notably the Bhoota Kola. These events involve spectacular performance art, ceremonial offerings, and communal decision-making, with all social groups participating regardless of caste.

=== In Kerala ===
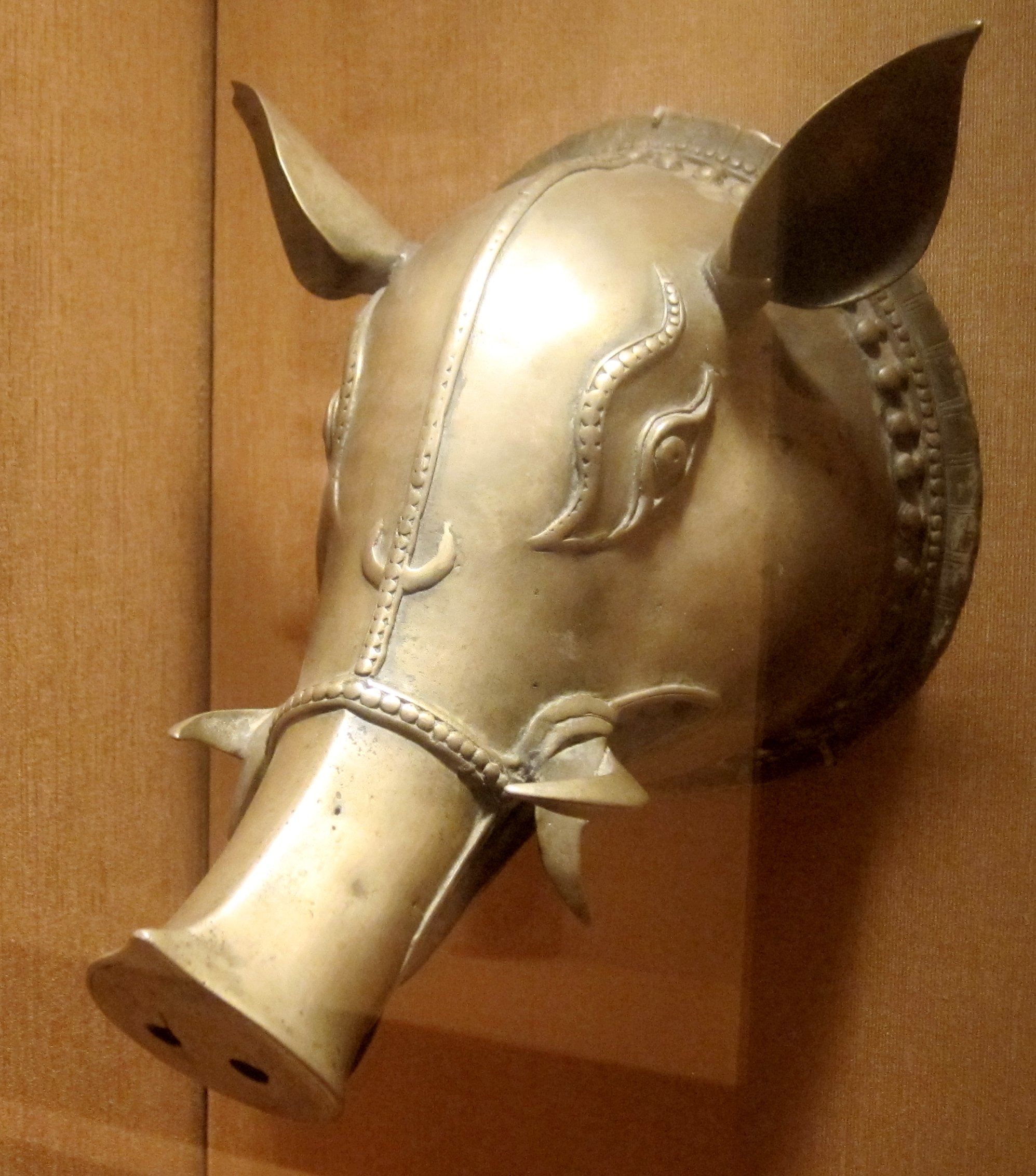
Panchuruli Theyyam mask from Kerala, 18th century.

In Northern Kerala i.e. Kasaragod (South Tulunadu), Panjurli daiva Theyyam, involves eating the chickens offered as offerings by devotees and in most places panjurli daiva is vegetarian and chicken is given as bali to its gana mani,while chanting and reciting the words in the Tulu language. The face of Panjuruli is called Rudra Minukku.

The Kallurti daiva is described as the sister of Panjuruli Theyyam.

== In popular culture ==
In contemporary times, popular media and film such as Kantara and Kantara: Chapter 1 have introduced Panjuruli's legend to new audiences.
