= Denizli =

City in Aegean Region, Turkey

- City
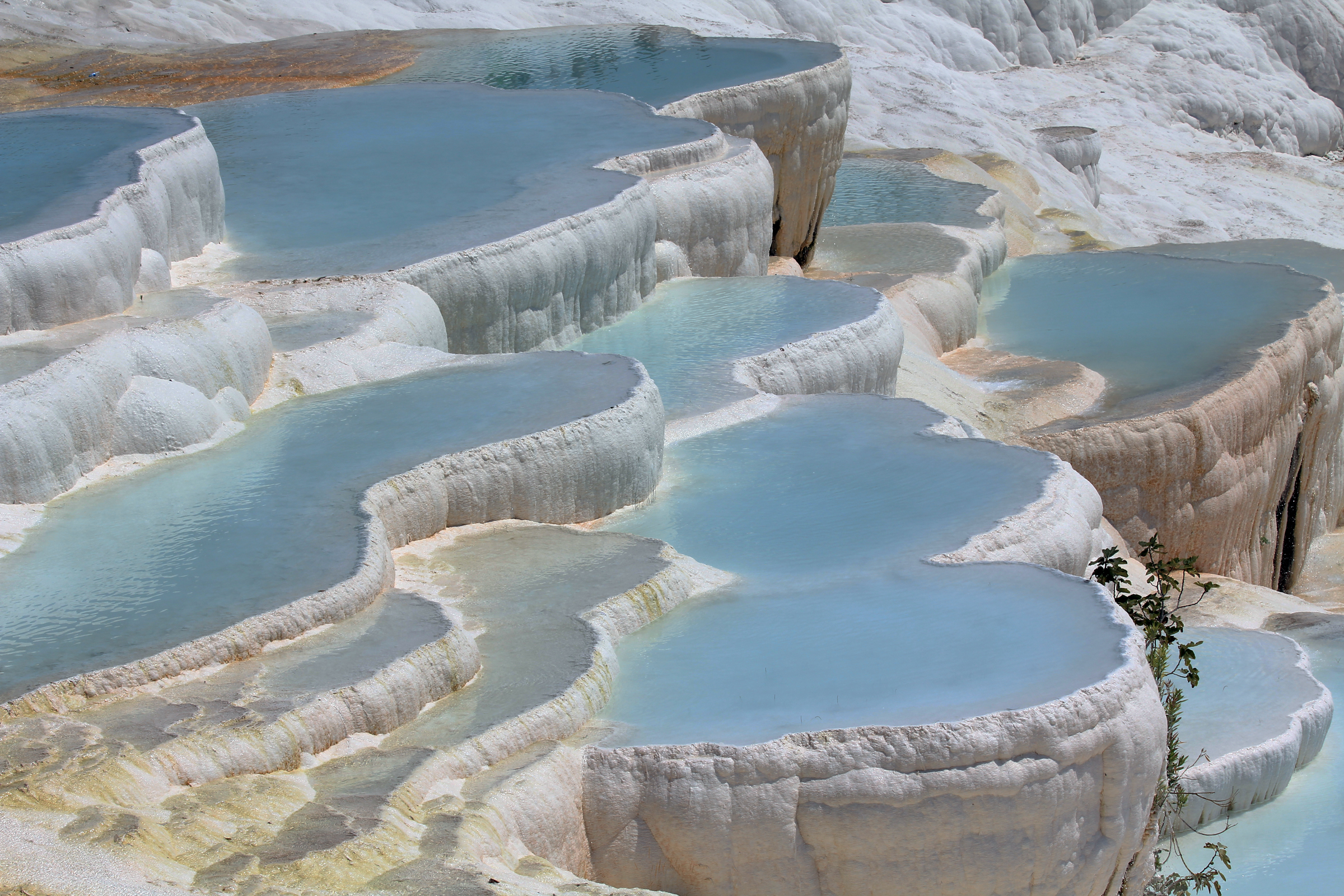
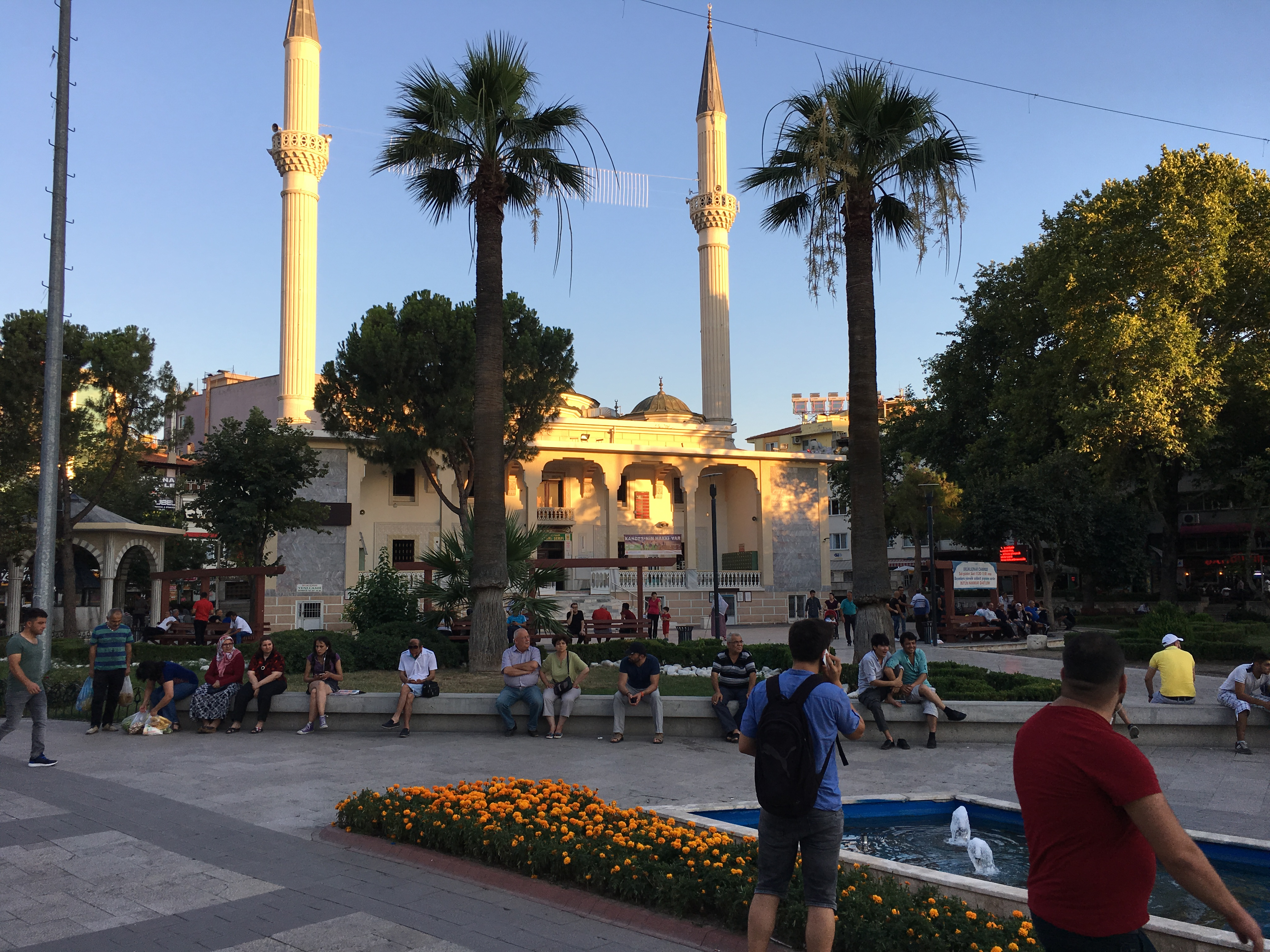
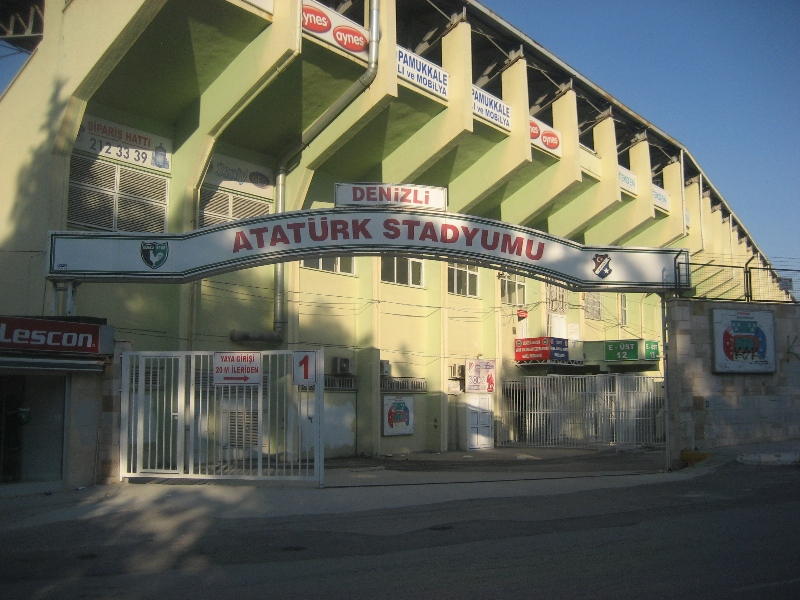
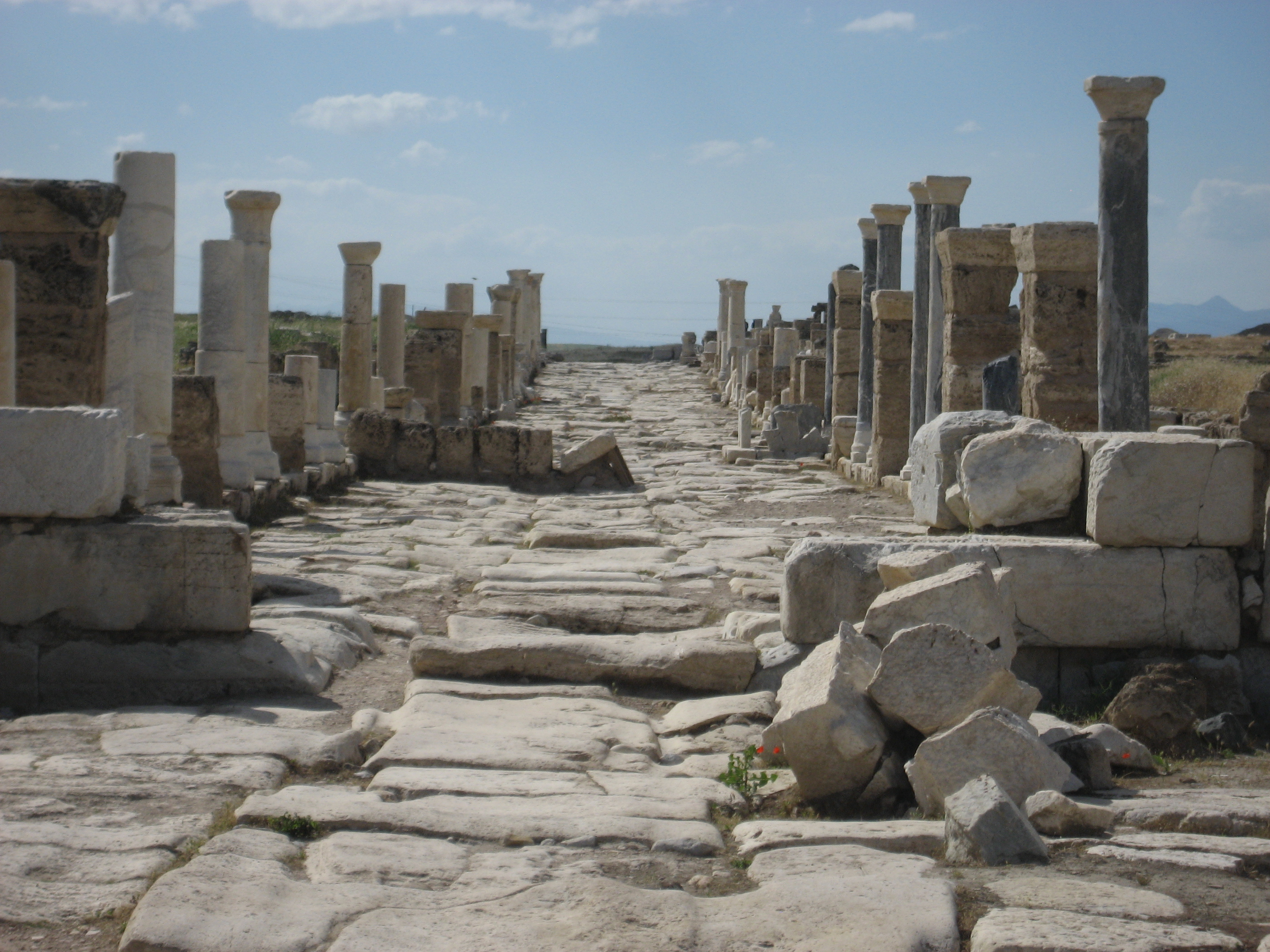
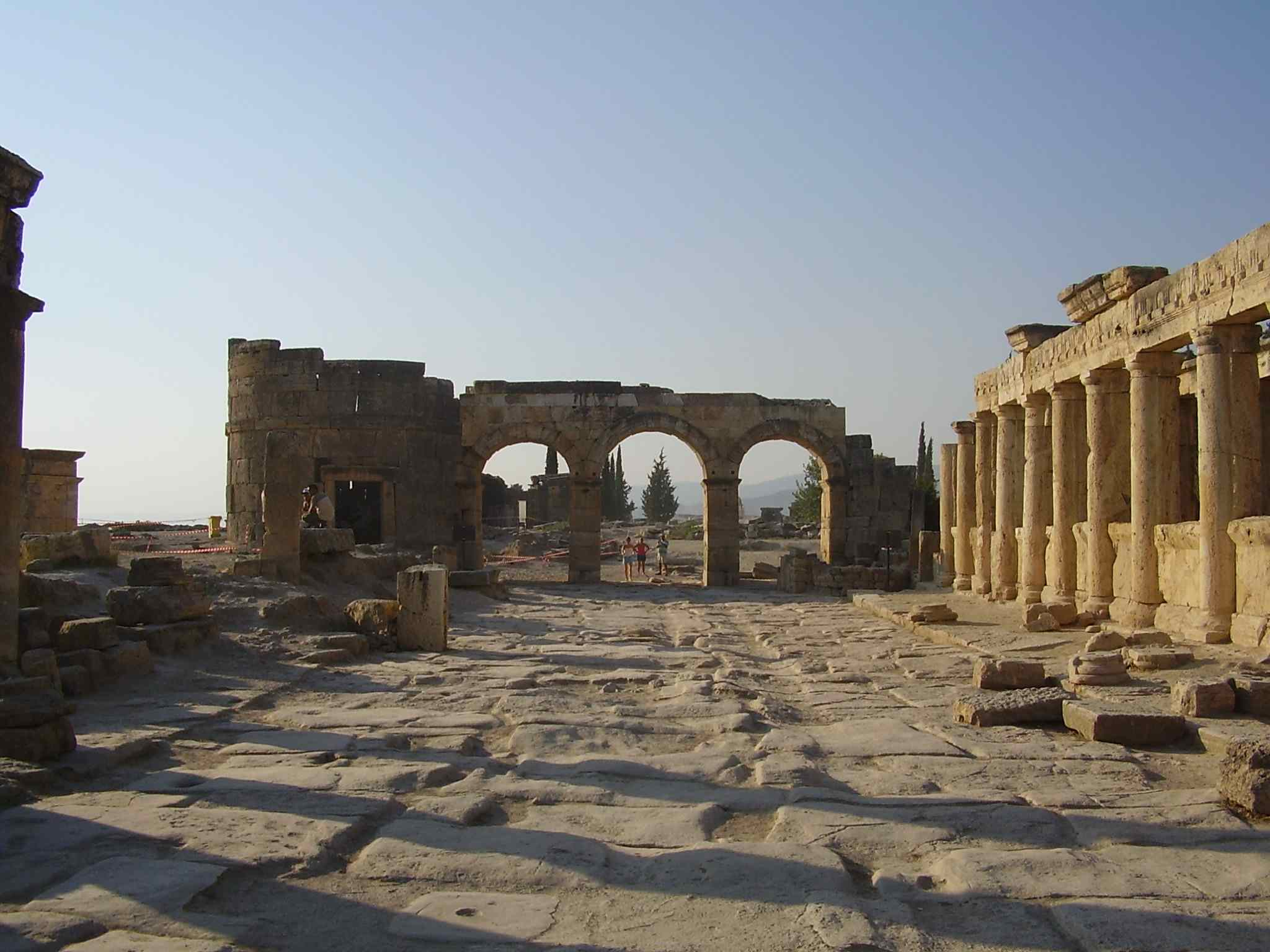
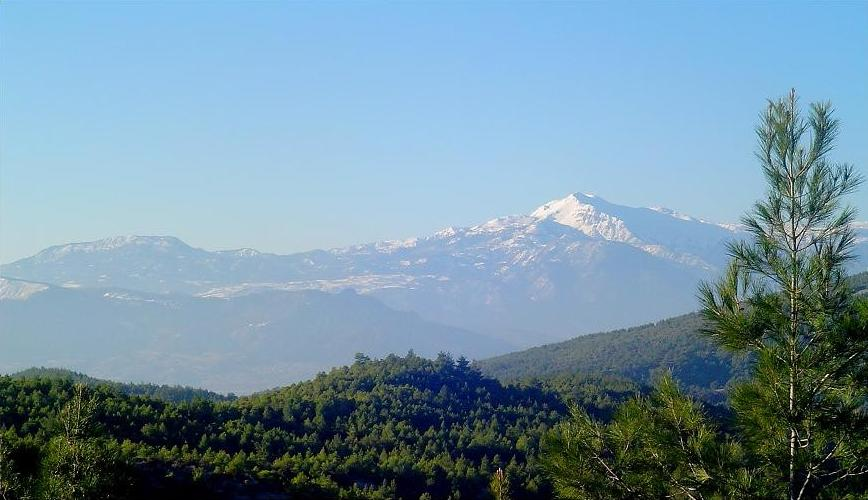
- Top to bottom: Pamukkale; Delikliçınar Square, Denizli Atatürk Stadium; Laodicea, Hierapolis; Mount Honaz View of the city from above

- Emblem of Denizli Metropolitan Municipality

- Location of Denizli Denizli (Europe) Denizli (Asia)
- Coordinates: 37°47′00″N 29°05′47″E
- Country: Turkey
- Region: Aegean Region
- Province: Denizli Province

Government
  - Mayor: Bülent Nuri Çavuşoğlu (YEP)
- Elevation: 324 m (1,063 ft)

Population (2024)
  - City: 1,061,371
  - Urban: 691,783
- Time zone: UTC+3 (TRT)
- Postal code: 20x xx
- Area code: (0090) 258
- Licence plate: 20
- Website: www.denizli.bel.tr

Denizli is a city in Aegean Turkey, and seat of the province of Denizli. The city forms the urban part of the districts Merkezefendi and Pamukkale, with a population of 691 783 in 2024.

Denizli has seen economic development in the last few decades, mostly due to textile production and exports.

Denizli also attracts visitors to the nearby mineral-coated hillside hot spring of Pamukkale, and with red color thermal water spa hotels Karahayıt, just 5 kilometres (3 miles) north of Pamukkale. Recently, Denizli became a major domestic tourism destination due to the various types of thermal waters in Sarayköy, Central/Denizli (where Karahayıt and Pamukkale towns are located), Akköy (Gölemezli), Buldan (Yenicekent), and Çardak districts.

The ancient ruined city of Hierapolis, as well as ruins of the city of Laodicea on the Lycus, the ancient metropolis of Phrygia, are nearby. Also in the vicinity of Honaz, about 10 mi (16 km) west of Denizli is, what was, in the 1st century AD, the city of Colossae.

The weather is hot in Denizli in summers, whereas in winters, it may occasionally be very cold with snow on the mountains that surround the city. Some years, snow can be observed in the urban areas. Springs and autumns are rainy, with a mild warm climate.

== Name ==
The word deniz means 'sea, large lake'. No sea or lake can be found near Denizli. However, the original Turkish name for the place was Tonguzlu, pronounced as toŋuzlu or doŋuzlu, later donuzlu (from toŋuz 'wild boar'). Thus Tonguzlu means a 'place where boars dwell'. Because of the phonetical process (t->d, ŋ->n), the name was changed into denizlü or denizli, similar in pronunciation but different in meaning, in order to avoid the connotation 'boar, pig', which is considered offensive in Islam. Ibn Battuta recorded that the city was called Dun Ghuzluh. The latter is said to mean 'the town of the swine'.

== History ==
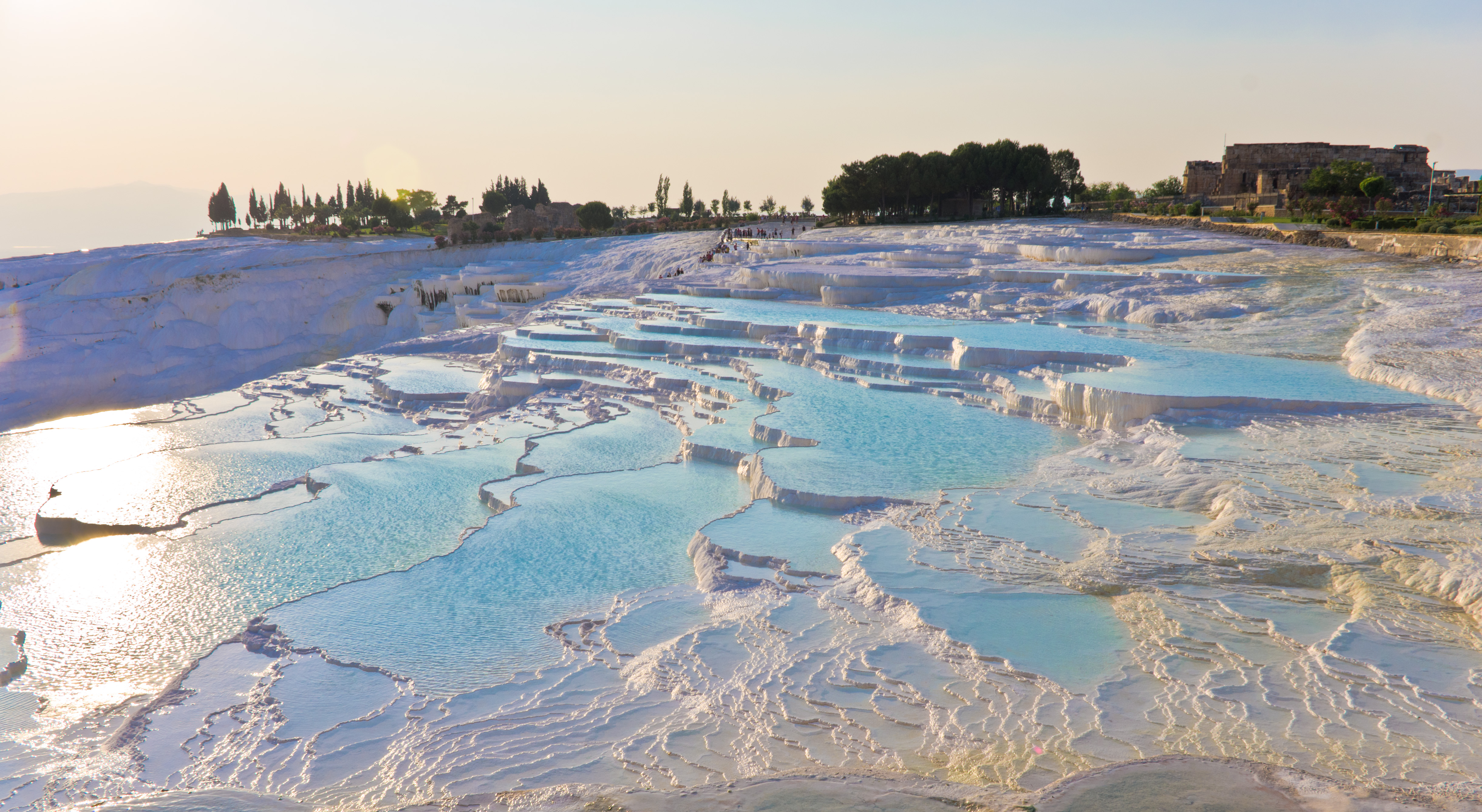
Pamukkale is a main tourism attraction in Denizli Province.

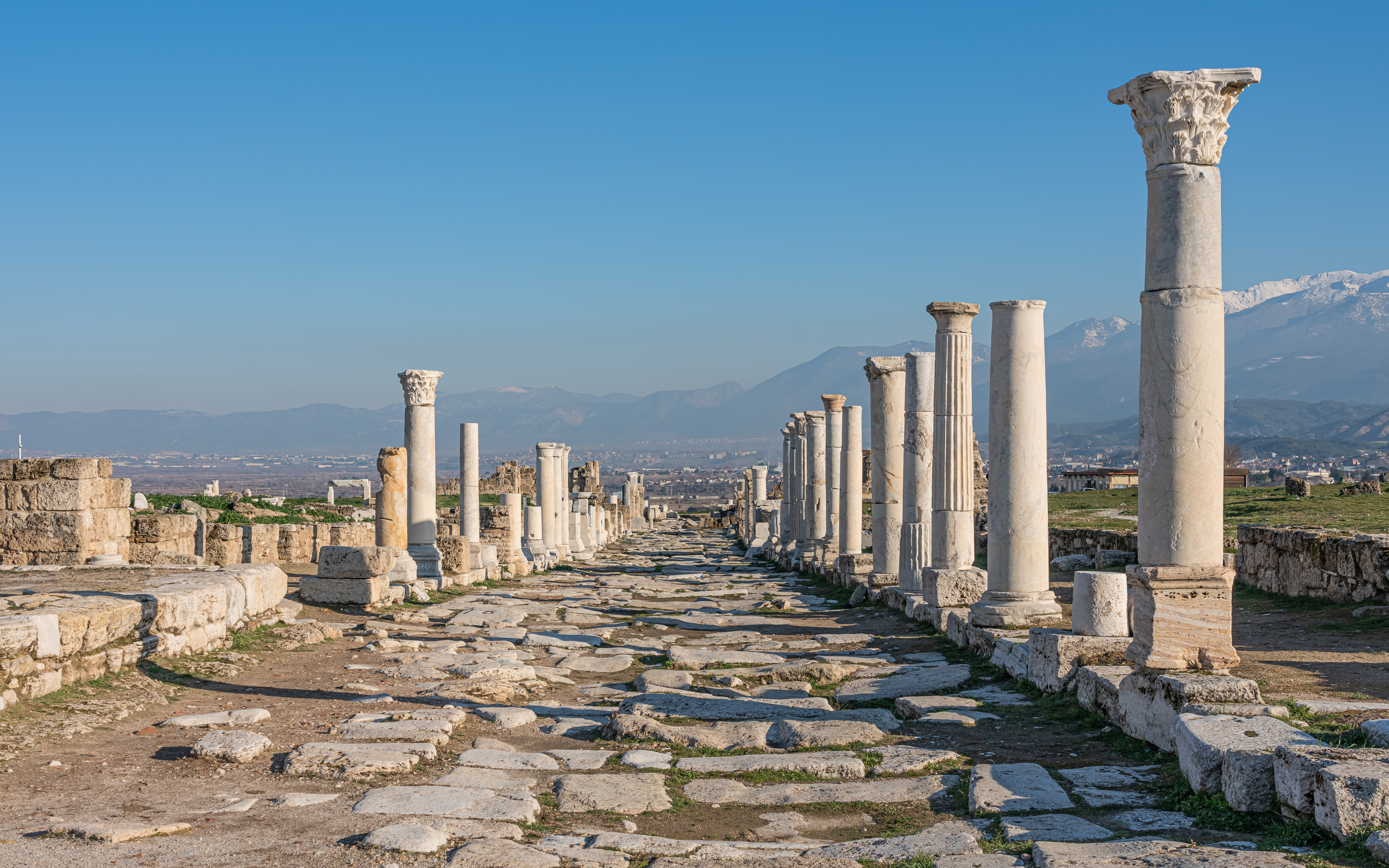
Archaeological site of Laodicea on the Lycus between Pamukkale and Denizli, Turkey. The photo shows Syria Street.

In antiquity, it was an important Greek town, called Attouda (Αττούδα), that existed through the ancient Greek and Roman eras; it was near the cities (Hierapolis and Laodicea on the Lycus) and flourished through the Byzantine period.

The city was conquered by the Seljuk Turks. Inhabitants of Laodicea were also resettled here in the Seljuk period.

Ibn Battuta visited the city, noting that:

In it there are seven mosques for the observance of Friday prayers, and it has splendid gardens, perennial streams, and gushing springs. Most of the artisans there are Greek women, for in it are many Greeks who are subject to the Turks and who pay dues to the sultan, including the jizya, and other taxes".

However, he also remarked that he needed to be escorted by horsemen on his way to the city, because the surrounding plain was "infested by a troop of brigands called al-Jarmiyān", referring to the Germiyanids.

In the 17th century, the Ottoman traveller Evliya Çelebi visited Denizli and recorded the town as follows: "The city is called by Turks as (Denizli) (which means has abundant of water sources like sea in Turkish) as there are several rivers and lakes around it. In fact it is a four-day trip from the sea. Its fortress is of square shape built on flat ground. It has no ditches. Its periphery is 470 steps long. It has four gates. These are: painters gate in North, saddle-makers gate in the East, new Mosque gate in the South, and vineyard gate in the West. There are some fifty armed watchmen in the fortress, and they attend the shop. The main city is outside the fortress with 44 districts and 3600 houses. There are 57 small and large mosques and district mosques, seven madrasahs, seven children's schools, six baths and 17 dervish lodges. As everybody lives in vineyards the upper classes and ordinary people do not flee from each other."

The city lived in peace for centuries without being involved in wars in a direct manner. Following World War I, during the Turkish War of Independence, the Greek Army managed to capture and come as close as Sarayköy, a small town 20 km (12 mi) northwest of Denizli, but did not venture into Denizli. They were then ousted from the region by Mustafa Kemal Pasha. The most widespread symbols of Denizli province are of textile industry.

== Geography ==
=== Climate ===
Denizli has a Mediterranean climate (Köppen: Csa or Trewartha: Cs), with hot, dry summers and mild to cool, rainy winters. The inland areas, like Çardak, Bozkurt, Çivril, and Çal districts/counties of the province are cooler and have a higher elevation than the seaside, western part of the Province. Therefore, there are climatic differences within the province and even in the Denizli urbanized area. The land is open to winds coming from the Aegean Sea as the mountains are perpendicular to the coastline.

Highest recorded temperature: 44.4 °C (111.9 °F) on 15 August 2007

Lowest recorded temperature: −11.4 °C (11.5 °F) on 9 February 1965

Climate data for Denizli (1991–2020, extremes 1957–2025)
| Month | Jan | Feb | Mar | Apr | May | Jun | Jul | Aug | Sep | Oct | Nov | Dec | Year |
|---|---|---|---|---|---|---|---|---|---|---|---|---|---|
| Record high °C (°F) | 22.6 (72.7) | 25.9 (78.6) | 31.8 (89.2) | 35.8 (96.4) | 39.5 (103.1) | 44.1 (111.4) | 43.9 (111.0) | 44.4 (111.9) | 41.6 (106.9) | 36.9 (98.4) | 31.6 (88.9) | 26.6 (79.9) | 44.4 (111.9) |
| Mean daily maximum °C (°F) | 10.7 (51.3) | 12.7 (54.9) | 16.5 (61.7) | 21.3 (70.3) | 27.0 (80.6) | 32.3 (90.1) | 35.7 (96.3) | 35.7 (96.3) | 31.0 (87.8) | 24.7 (76.5) | 17.8 (64.0) | 12.2 (54.0) | 23.1 (73.6) |
| Daily mean °C (°F) | 6.2 (43.2) | 7.6 (45.7) | 10.7 (51.3) | 15.1 (59.2) | 20.2 (68.4) | 25.1 (77.2) | 28.3 (82.9) | 28.2 (82.8) | 23.5 (74.3) | 17.9 (64.2) | 11.9 (53.4) | 7.7 (45.9) | 16.9 (62.4) |
| Mean daily minimum °C (°F) | 2.7 (36.9) | 3.6 (38.5) | 6.0 (42.8) | 9.7 (49.5) | 14.2 (57.6) | 18.6 (65.5) | 21.6 (70.9) | 21.5 (70.7) | 17.2 (63.0) | 12.5 (54.5) | 7.5 (45.5) | 4.4 (39.9) | 11.6 (52.9) |
| Record low °C (°F) | −10.5 (13.1) | −11.4 (11.5) | −7.0 (19.4) | −2.0 (28.4) | 2.7 (36.9) | 7.9 (46.2) | 12.6 (54.7) | 11.6 (52.9) | 6.6 (43.9) | −0.8 (30.6) | −4.5 (23.9) | −10.4 (13.3) | −11.4 (11.5) |
| Average precipitation mm (inches) | 85.7 (3.37) | 69.7 (2.74) | 63.8 (2.51) | 54.8 (2.16) | 47.9 (1.89) | 31.8 (1.25) | 16.3 (0.64) | 12.1 (0.48) | 15.7 (0.62) | 37.1 (1.46) | 57.8 (2.28) | 81.1 (3.19) | 573.8 (22.59) |
| Average precipitation days | 11.6 | 10.97 | 11.03 | 9.8 | 8.97 | 5.13 | 2.23 | 2.57 | 3.13 | 6.13 | 7 | 12 | 90.6 |
| Average snowy days | 2.7 | 2.4 | 1.1 | 0 | 0 | 0 | 0 | 0 | 0 | 0 | 0 | 1.2 | 7.4 |
| Average relative humidity (%) | 71.3 | 67.6 | 63.0 | 58.7 | 54.1 | 46.8 | 41.6 | 43.3 | 48.5 | 58.7 | 65.3 | 71.6 | 57.5 |
| Mean monthly sunshine hours | 110.6 | 127.5 | 173.3 | 207.9 | 273.5 | 322.0 | 358.5 | 324.1 | 263.9 | 205.4 | 142.6 | 101.8 | 2,611.1 |
| Mean daily sunshine hours | 3.6 | 4.6 | 5.6 | 6.9 | 8.8 | 10.7 | 11.6 | 10.5 | 8.8 | 6.7 | 4.9 | 3.3 | 7.2 |
Source 1: Turkish State Meteorological Service
Source 2: NOAA (humidity, sun 1991–2020), Meteomanz (snow days 2000–2023)

== Denizli today ==
=== Economy ===
During World War I, Denizli mined chromium.

=== Transportation ===
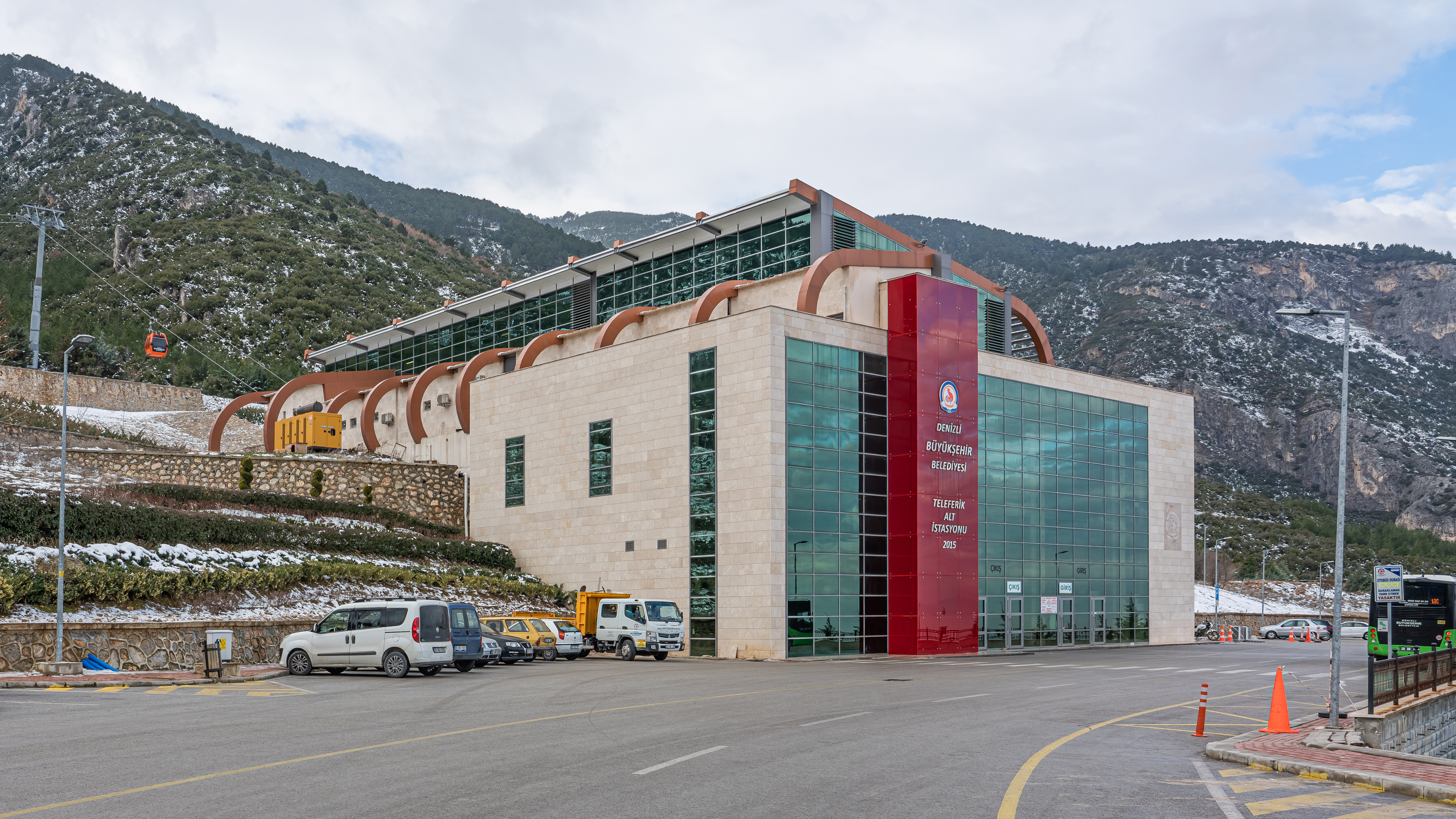
Lower station of the cableway (Teleferik) in Denizli

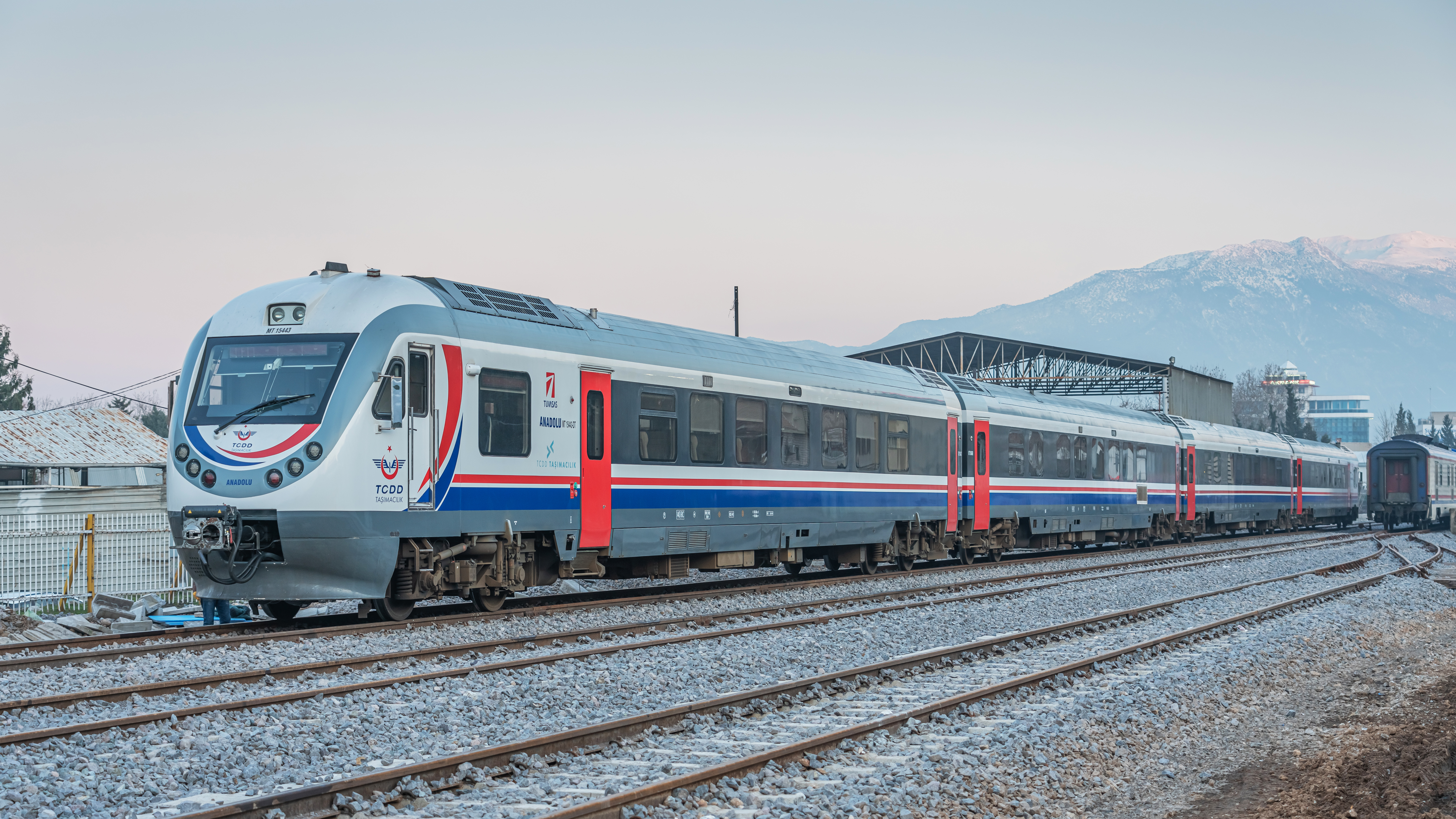
Denizli Railway Station

Denizli Çardak Airport is about 45 minutes drive from the city center.

The extension of İzmir-Aydın highway to Denizli has been announced for several years. Initial infrastructure was laid in Aydın, but the rest is still forthcoming. The present Aydın-Denizli road, has a very high level of traffic, especially trucks, with each town along the road possessing its own industrial zone.

=== Places of interest ===
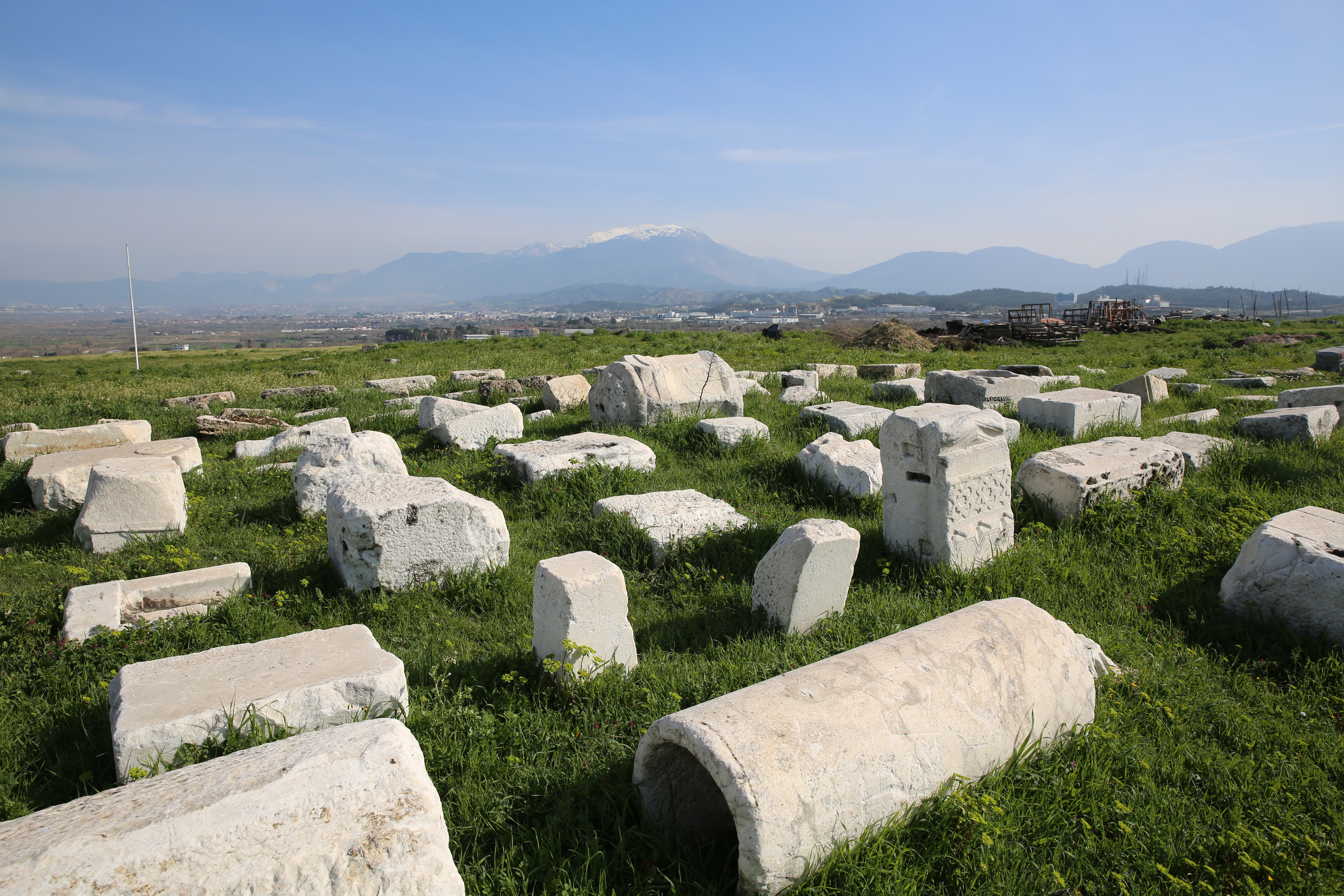
- Ancient City of Laodicea
  Laodicea ad Lycum: 6 km (4 mi) north of Denizli near the village of Eskihisar. The city was established by Seleucid King, Antiochus II in honor of his wife, Laodice. This trading city was famous for its woolen and cotton cloths. A letter written by a Laodecian says: "I am happy. I have fortune and I am not in need of anything." Following a large earthquake which destroyed the city, what remains of the ancient city are one of the seven churches of Asia Minor, the stadium, the amphitheatre and the odeon, the cistern and the aqueduct. (see further Laodicean Church)
- Hierapolis and Pamukkale World Heritage Sites -20 km (12 mi) north of Denizli Pamukkale travertines. The city of Hierapolis was founded by the Pergamon King Eumenes II in 190 BC. Its closeness to Laodicea led to commercial and military rivalry. The town was built in Greek style. Despite suffering a violent earthquake in 17 AD, it reached its peak during the Roman and Byzantine periods. It was reconstructed during the 2nd and 3rd centuries in stone from quarries in the area, in a Roman style. The town had its most glorious years during the reign of Roman Emperors Septimius Severus and Caracalla and became an episcopal seat during the expansion of Christianity. However, as a result of several earthquakes, the most violent of which was in 1354, a great part of the town was destroyed, and its people migrated.
- The Seljuq caravanserai Akhan, which is 6 km (4 mi) from Denizli City on the Ankara highway, and a great part of which still remains, was constructed by Karasungur bin Abdullah in 1253-54 when he was acting as the commander of Ladik. It was recently restored along with the Ottoman konaks nearby and is set to become a visitor's attraction by its own right.
- Honaz mountain is a popular picnic excursion for Denizli's people in summer.
- The nearby village of Goncalı, which is on the railway line, is another excursion. People come to eat the charcoal-grilled thinly-cut kebab called çöp şiş, preferably with the local süzme yoghurt and a glass of rakı.
- There is a statue of Atatürk at Çınar Meydanı in the city centre.
- Servergazi türbesi is located near to the Yenişehir neighborhood. The tomb of the 12th century Turkish commander of the Seljuk akıncı unit is located there. Many locals visit and pray at the tomb especially on weekends.
- Teraspark Shopping and Lifestyle Center, Teraspark AVM, located in Yenişehir. Teraspark AVM is the biggest shopping center in Denizli.
- Forum Çamlık Shopping and Lifestyle Center, Forum Çamlık AVM, located in the heart of the city centre, Demokrasi Meydanı/Square and surrounded by residential areas, welcomes more than 450,000 people within a catchment area of 20 minutes. The design of Forum Çamlık was inspired by the rich architectural elements that are unique to Province of Denizli. Local stones like Denizli travertine and marble are used for the cladding of many buildings.
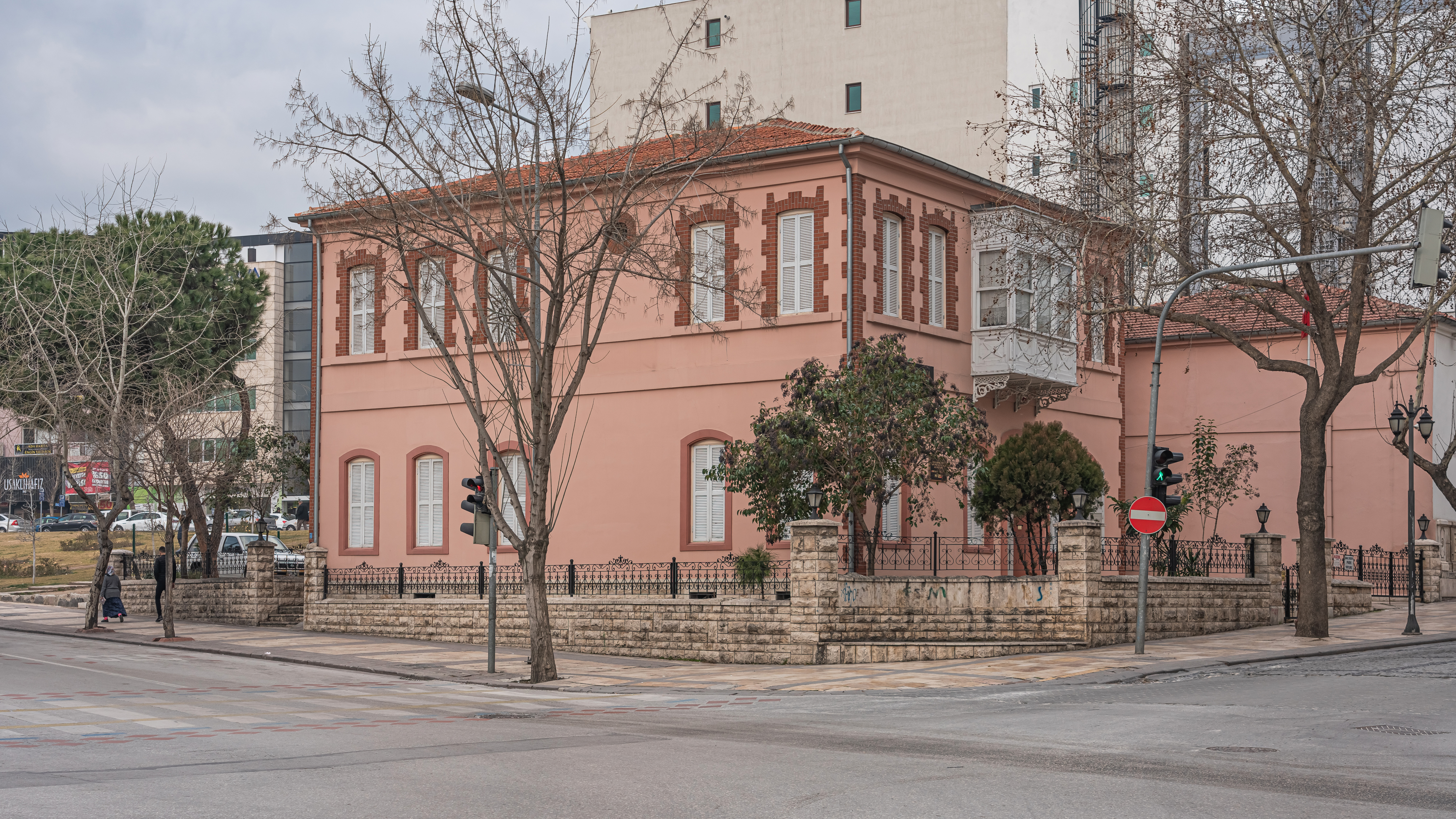
Denizli Museum

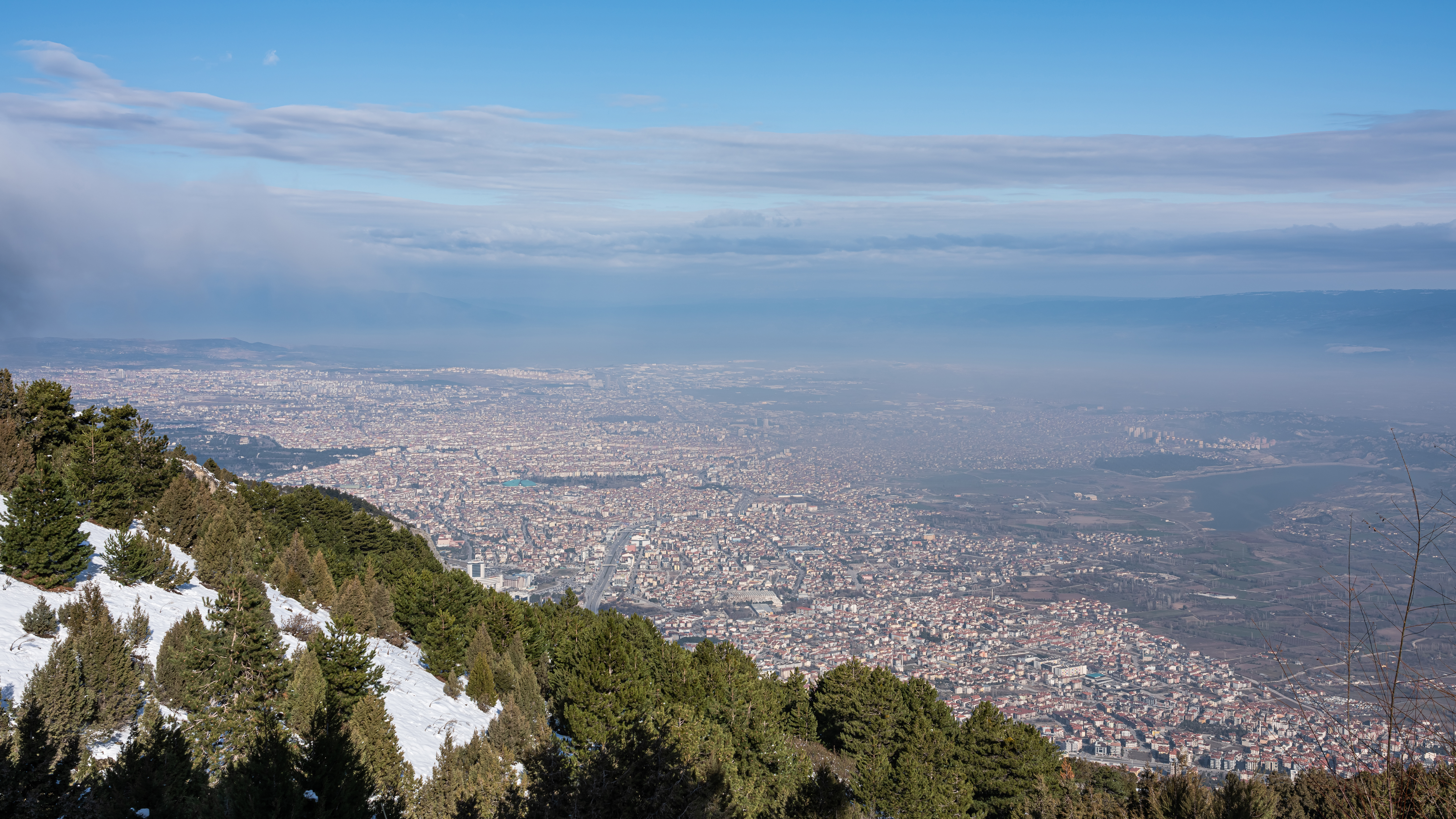
View of Denizli from a hill

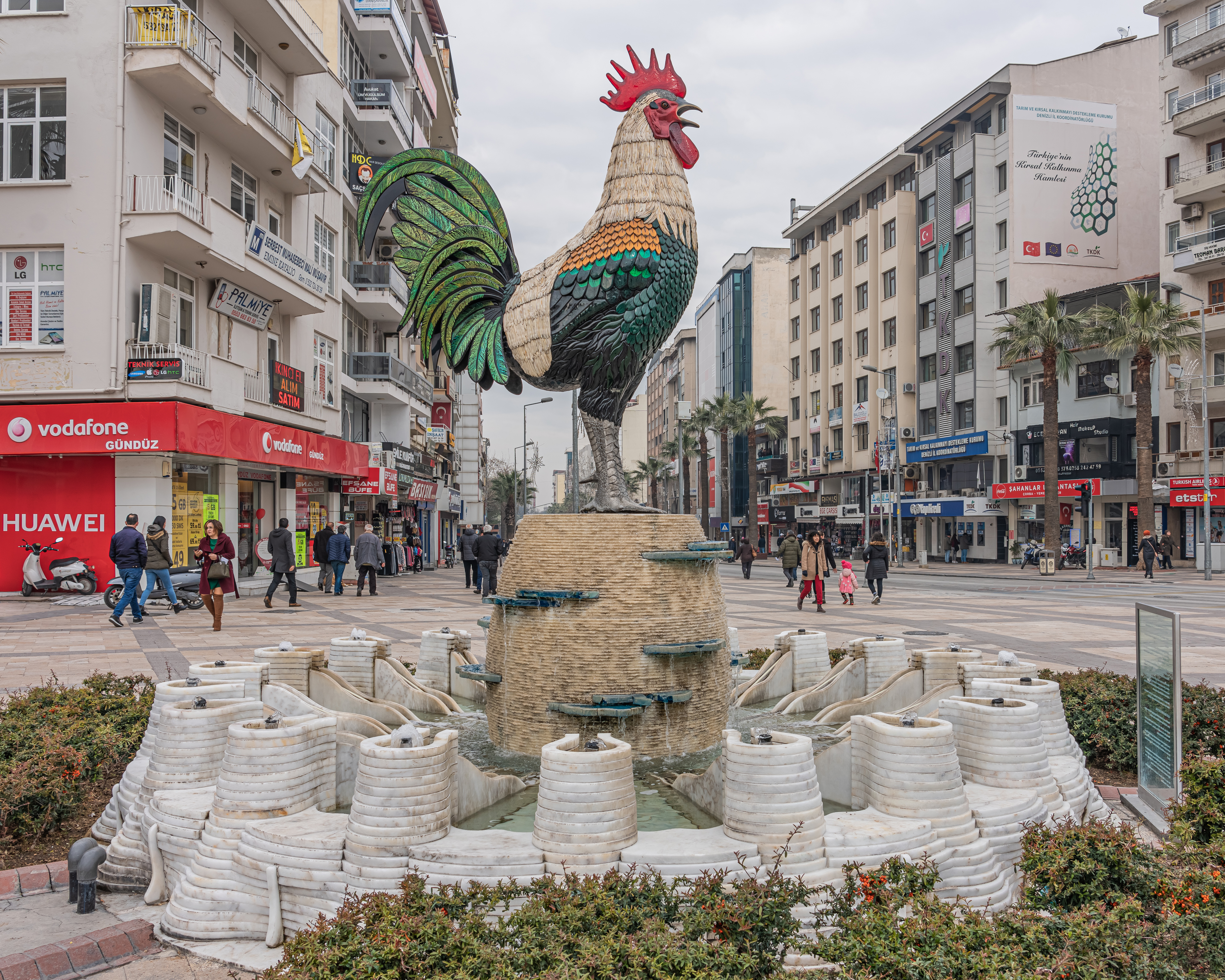
Rooster is the symbol of the city

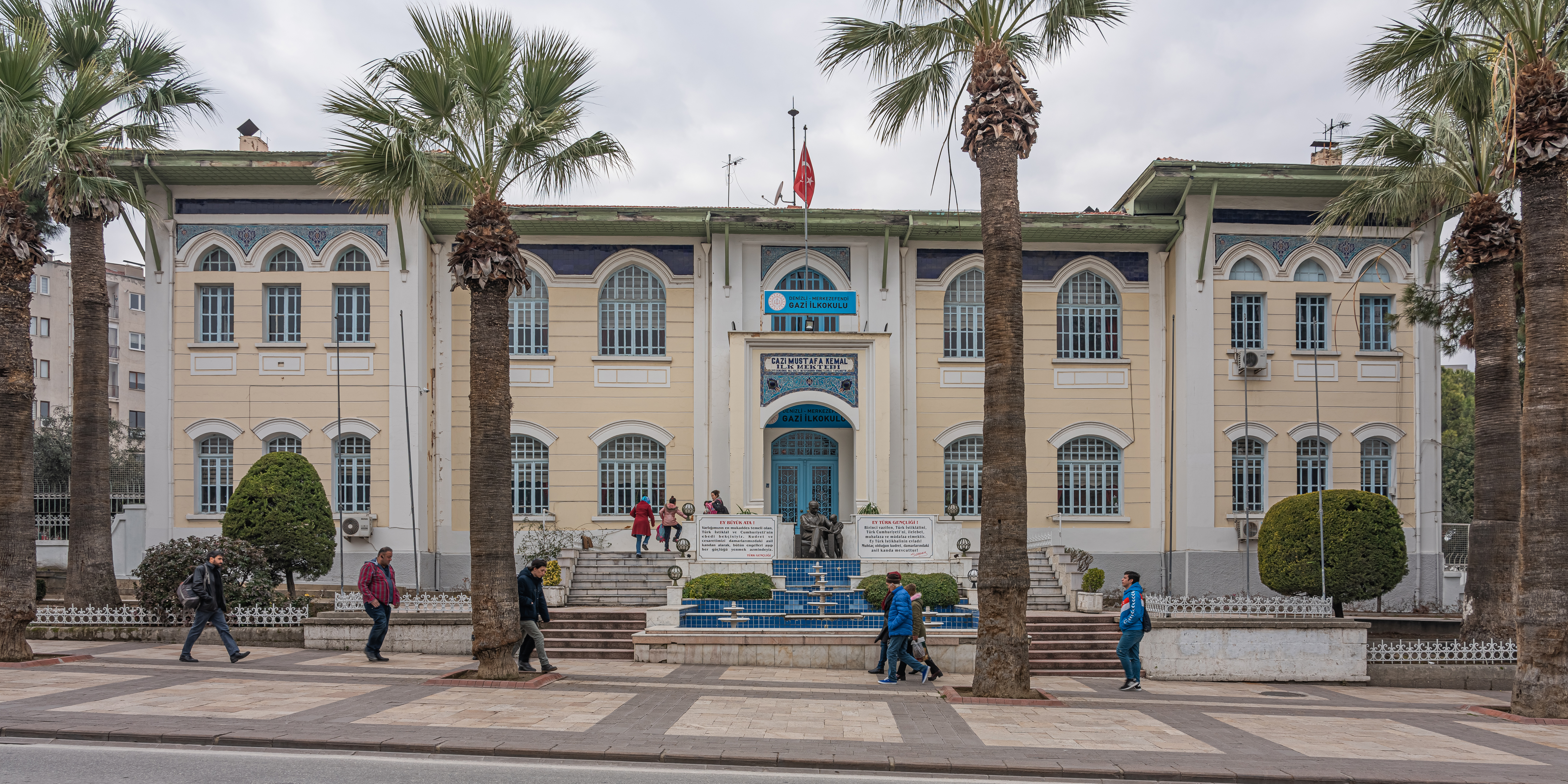
Gazi Mustafa Kemal Elementary School

== Notable people ==
- Veli Acar, football player
- Sezen Aksu, pop singer
- Ugur Aktas, football player
- Berkehan Aydın, navy pilot
- Cengiz Bektaş, architect and writer
- Elçin Sevgi Suçin, poet, writer, and literary critic
- Sıla Gençoğlu, pop singer
- Hasan Güngör, Olympic medalist in wrestling
- Aysel Gürel, songwriter and theater actress
- Levent Kartop, football player
- Recep Niyaz, football player
- Yavuz Özkan, football player
- Sarp Sanin, rock singer
- Osman Sınav, producer, director, screenwriter, and advertiser
- Bayram Şit, Olympic medalist in wrestling
- Hasan Ali Toptaş, author
- Kemal Türkler, trade union leader and politician
- Baturalp Ünlü, Olympic swimmer
- Tuba Ünsal, actress and model
- Kerem Yılmazer, theater and movie actor, voice actor

== Ancient sites of Denizli ==
- Laodikeia
- Hierapolis
- Trapezopolis
- Attuda

== Twin towns – sister cities ==
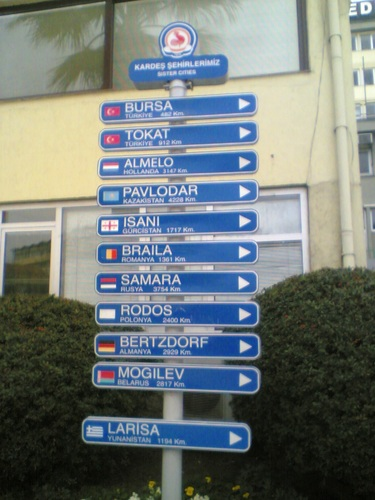
Sign with sister cities (2009 state)

Denizli is twinned with:

- Almelo, Netherlands, since 1974
- Brăila, Romania, since 2005
- (Georgia (country)) Isani (Tbilisi), Georgia, since 1993
- Jiaozhou, China, since 2004
- Muan, South Korea, since 2009
- Pavlodar, Kazakhstan, since 1995
- Qazvin, Iran, since 2012

Denizli also cooperates with Bursa and Tokat in Turkey.
