= Gulikan Theyyam =

Hindu god

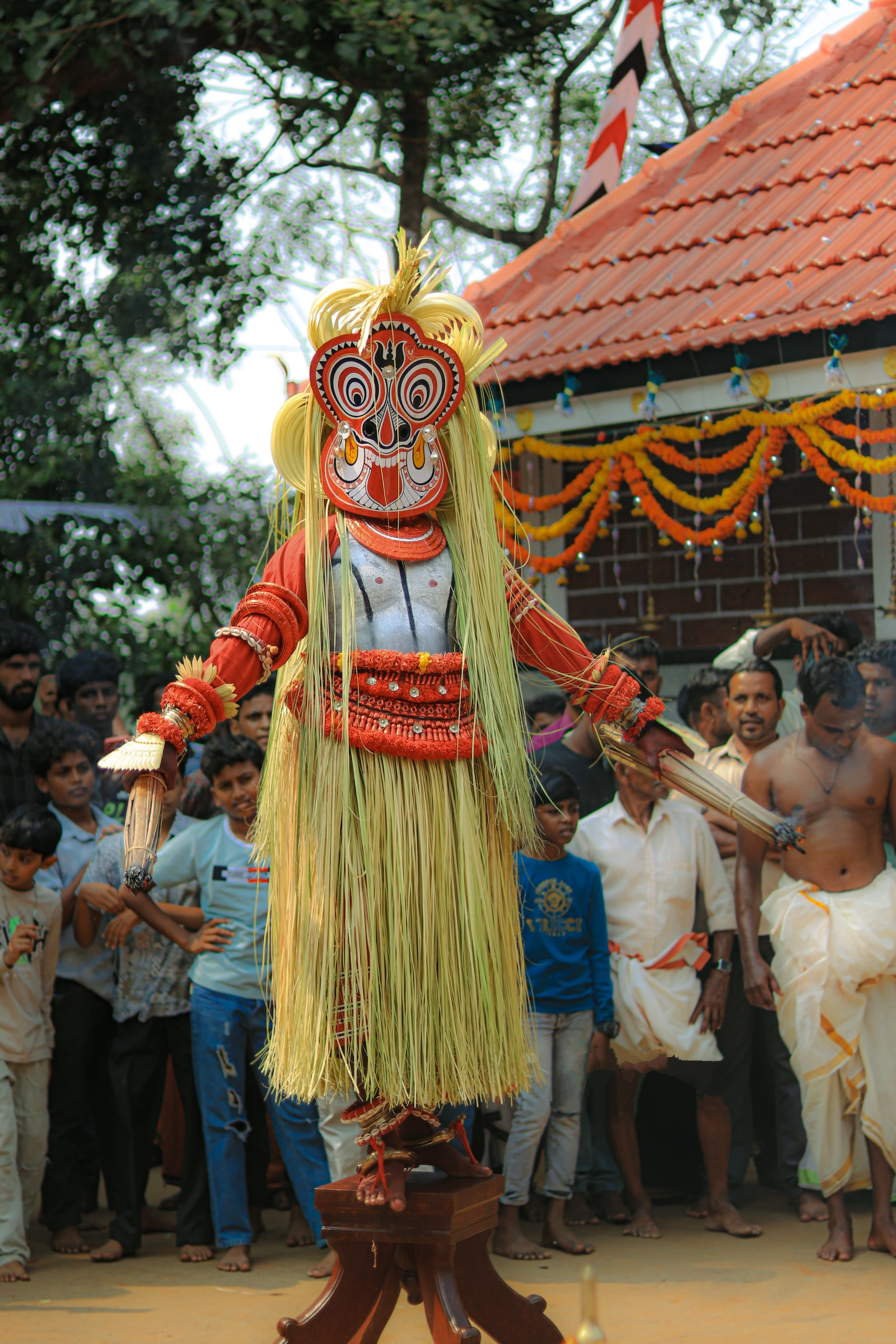
- Gulikan Theyyam
- Affiliation: Hinduism
- Region: North Kerala, India

Gulikan Theyyam is worshipped in Kerala and is important in Kerala astrology as son of Shani deva. Gulikan Theyyam is part of the Kaliyattam, a popular religious folk dance in the Indian state of Kerala. In the Tulu Nadu region this deity is worshipped as Guliga Daiva, a lord in Hindu Culture.

Gulikan is worshipped in small shrines called Gulikan Kavus. The most famous and powerful one is at Nileshwar in the district of Kasaragod and is popularly known as the Benkanakavu [Veeranakavu]. Nileshwar derives its name from Lord Shiva in the form of Neeleswaram or the Blue God. Benganakavu is located at the centre of Nileshwar.

Gulikan Theyyam - Karakkeel Tharavadu, Mottakkunnu, Kannur

Due to the presence of the God Guliga in Benkanakavu, The adjacent Koroth Nair Tharavadu, Kazhakakkar, and Kolakkar organize the Theyyam festival in Benanakavu once every two years. It is performed in other temples. In Kozhikode near Nadapuram. A temple named Pattare Paradevatha Kshethram performs Gulikan Theyyam annually.

== Gallery ==
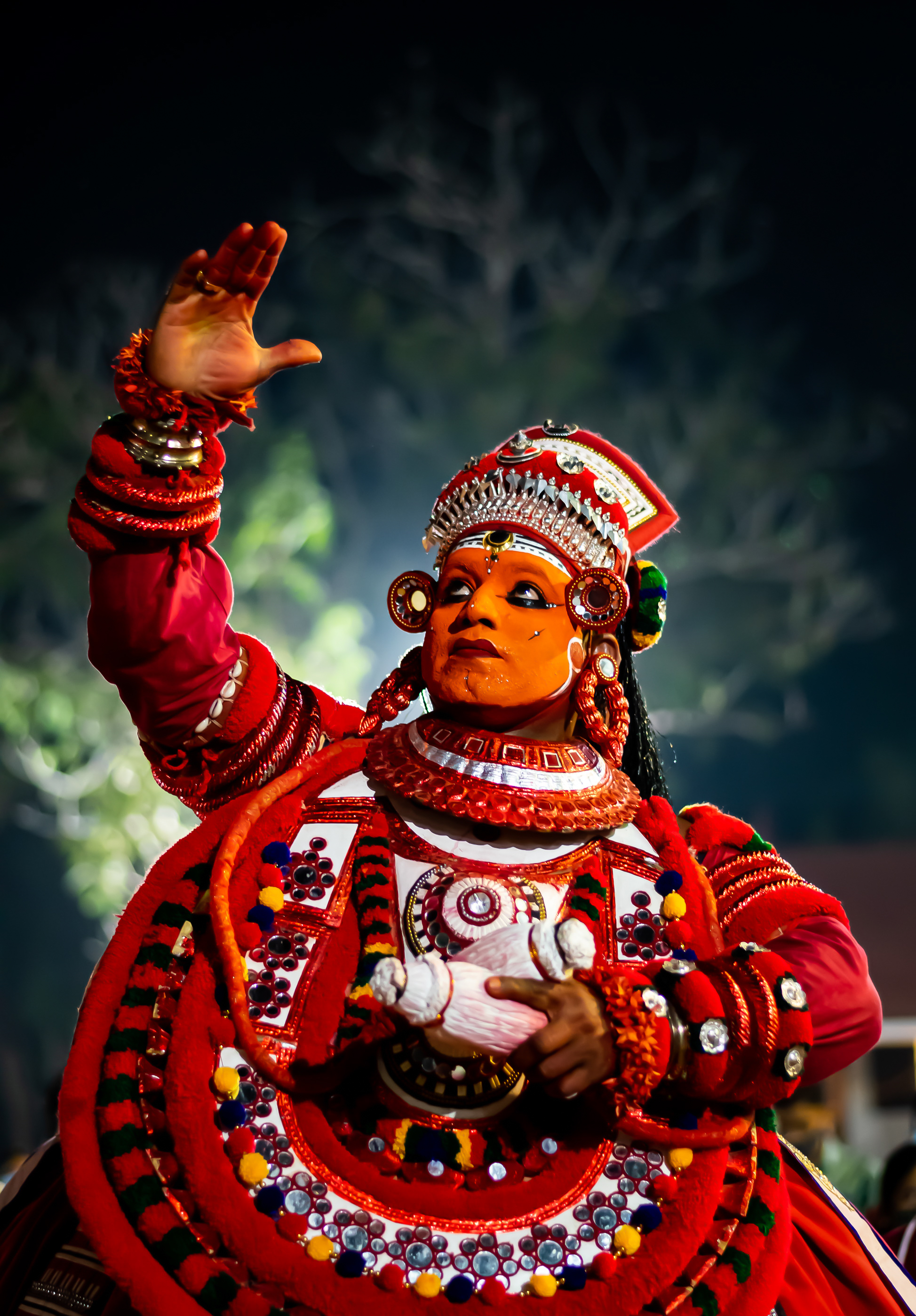
Gulikan Theyyam Vellattam

== See also ==
- Buta Kola
- Theyyam
- Panjurli
