= Sarpa (app) =

Indian snakebite prevention app

Sarpa or SARPA (Snake Awareness, Rescue and Protection app) is a snakebite app, an application for mobile devices developed in India to provide rapid, life-saving help for victims of snakebite, which kill an estimated 58,000 people a year in India. The app provides information about snakes, gets fast aid for people bitten, and helps in the development of antivenoms. Similar systems developed in India include SnakeHub, Snake Lens, Snakepedia, Serpent and the Big Four Mapping Project. The apps provide rapid response to snakebite incidents, often in remote areas, using a network of volunteers managed by local wildlife departments; their use can save human lives by providing rapid medical care, and also snakes, by helping to avoid interaction between the species.

In 2026, it was announced that the app had plans to offer real-time contact from doctors directly from the app to provide users with decision-making advice.
