= Sarp (musician) =

Turkish musician

Sarp Sanin
- Born: 22 October 1977 (age 48); Ankara, Turkey
- Genres: Rock
- Occupations: Singer-songwriter, guitarist
- Label: Rec By Saatchi

Sarp Sanin (born 22 October 1977, in Ankara), better known as Sarp, is a Turkish rock musician

== Biography ==
Born in 1977 in Ankara, Sarp spent his childhood and younger years in Denizli. He grew listening to Elvis Presley, Deep Purple and his favorite band The Doors. Sarp learned to play the guitar with a close friend of his. While studying at Denizli Anatolian High School, he formed a music group called "Butterfly" and began playing at cafes in Denizli. In 1996, he moved to İzmir and began studying chemical engineering at Ege University. There, he founded a group called "Trap".

Sarp released his first album Siyahın Matemi (Mourning of the dark) in 2001. Despite the economic crises, it sold well and produced the hit songs Siyahın Matemi and Bu Gece (Tonight)s. Sarp had a disagreement with his record company about the creative aspect of his next work. He performed at numerous concerts and festivals throughout the country.

In 2006, he signed with the label, Rec By Saatchi, and released his second album Eski Aşklar to great success. Eski Aşklar (Old produced hits like Tek Başına, Bana Öyle Bakma, and the title song Eski Aşklar) was written in memory of his brother who died in 1999.

== Discography ==
- Siyahın Matemi (2000)
- Eski Aşklar (2006)
- Çırılçıplak (2013)
