= Sarpa Kavu =

Traditional natural sacred spaces in South India

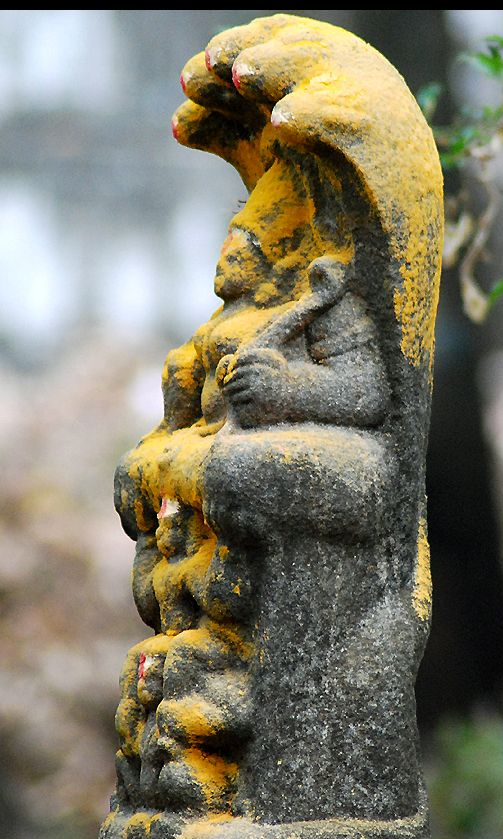
A sarpa kavu at Sakthanthamburan palace, Thrissur

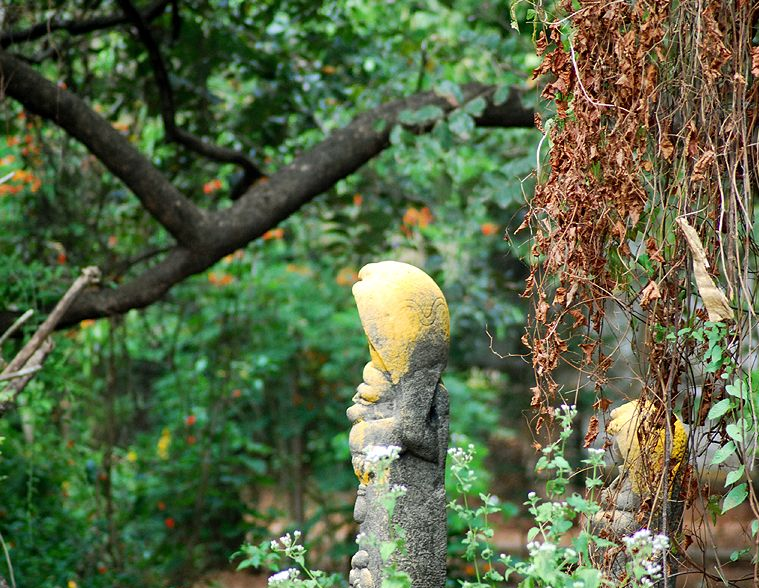
A sarpa kavu at Sakthanthamburan palace, Thrissur

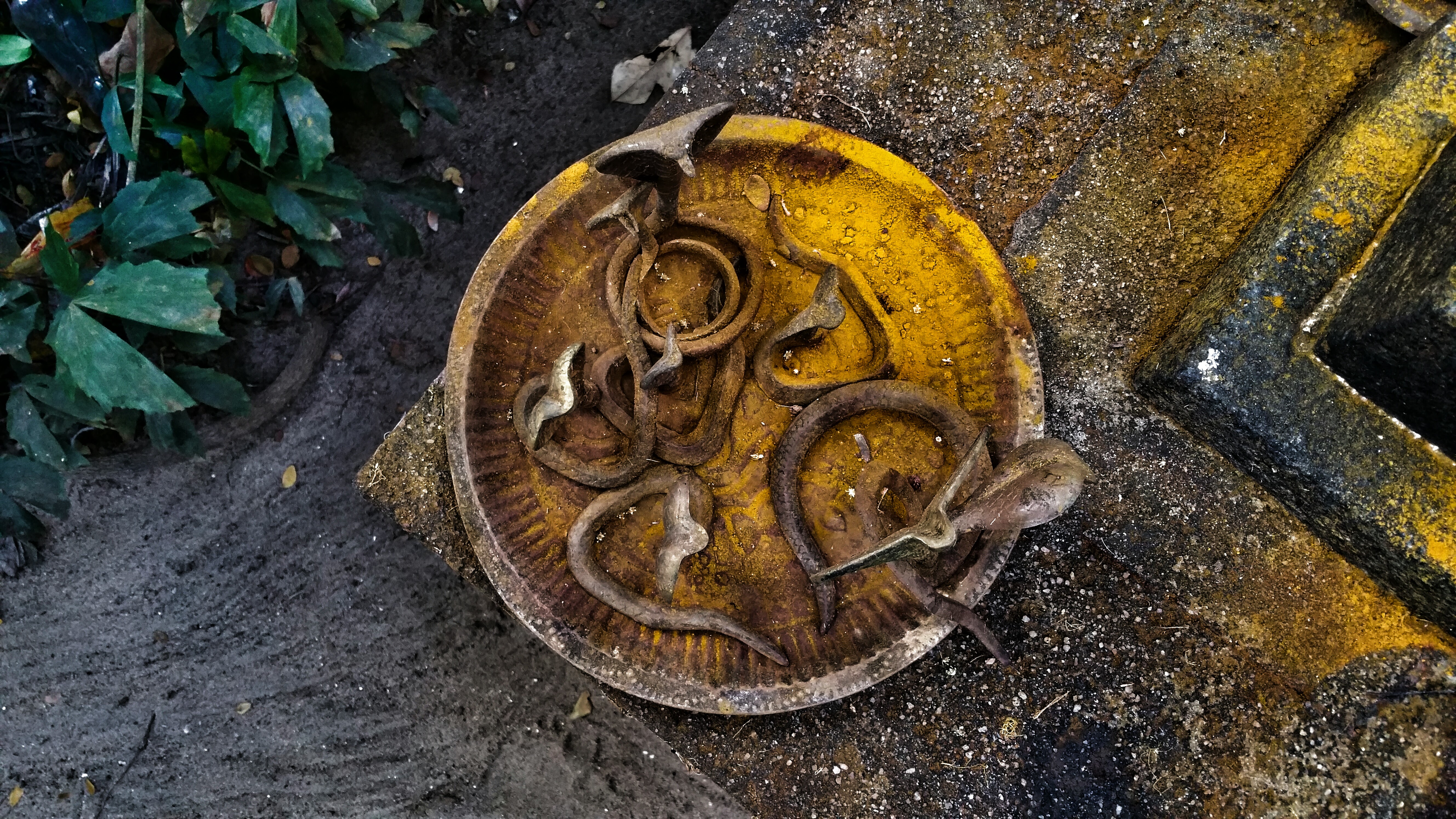
A sarpa kavu at Kayikkara, Thiruvananthapuram

A sarpa kavu or naga banna (lit. "snake groves") is a traditional sacred grove found near ancestral homes in Kerala, Kodagu and Tulunad regions of South India. These groves are believed to be inhabited by snakes, and typically contain representations of a nagaraja (serpent king) and other serpentine deities within stone houses. Ritual offerings and ceremonies are conducted at these sites, which are maintained and revered by Hindu communities. Access to the groves is generally restricted except during religious observances.

== Legend ==
According to the Keralolpati, the land of Kerala was reclaimed from the Arabian Sea by Parashurama, the sixth avatar of Vishnu. Following his extermination of the Kshatriya class, Parashurama established sixty-four villages for Brahmins (Nambudiris) in the region. The land was, however, inhabited by nagas, a serpent-like race, which posed a threat to the Brahmins. Seeking guidance, Parashurama prayed to Shiva, who advised him to propitiate the serpent king Vasuki by travelling to the subterranean realm of Patala. An accord was reached between humans and nagas: the nagas were instructed to vacate the areas designated for human settlement and occupy anthills and burrows instead. In return, humans were required to designate portions of their homes for the worship of snakes. These preserved areas subsequently evolved into small forested groves known as sarpa kavu.

== Naga Deities ==
Nagaraja is the main deity in the grove. Other deities include Nagayakshi, wife of Nagaraja and Nagachamundi, sister of Nagaraja, and about 3000 other members of the Naga family. Other deities include Vasuki, Sarpayakshi, Karinagam (black serpent), Anchilamaninagam (five-hooded jewel-carrying serpent) and Paranagam (flying serpent).

== See also ==
- Naga Panchami
- Mannarasala Temple
- Naga (mythology)
- Sarpam Thullal
- Nagaradhane
- Serpent (symbolism)
- Snake worship
