= Byzantine Anatolia =

History of Anatolia under the Byzantine Empire

Byzantine Anatolia or Byzantine Asia Minor refers to the peninsula of Anatolia (located in present-day Turkey) during the rule of the Byzantine Empire. Anatolia was of vital importance to the empire following the Muslim invasion of Syria and Egypt during the reign of the Byzantine Emperor Heraclius in the years 634–645 AD. Over the next two hundred and fifty years, the region suffered constant raids by Arab Muslim forces raiding mainly from the cities of Antioch, Tarsus, and Aleppo near the Anatolian borders. However, the Byzantine Empire maintained control over the Anatolian peninsula until the High Middle Ages (years 1080s), when imperial authority in the area began to collapse.

The Byzantine Empire re-established control over parts of Anatolia during the First Crusade and the Komnenian restoration, and following the sack of Constantinople during the Fourth Crusade, Anatolia became the heartland of the successor states of the Empire of Nicaea and Empire of Trebizond. Following the retaking of Constantinople in 1261, the region gradually passed out of Byzantine control and into the hands of the Ottoman Turks as the empire gradually crumbled. The last Byzantine fortress of Philadelphia fell in 1399, and the last Byzantine presence in the area at Trapezus ended in 1461 with the fall of Trebizond.

== History ==
=== Background ===
Mithridates VI Eupator, ruler of the Kingdom of Pontus in northern Anatolia, otherwise known as "Asia Minor" in Classical antiquity, waged war against the Roman Republic in the year 88 BC in order to halt the advance of Roman hegemony in the Aegean Sea region. Mithridates VI sought to dominate Asia Minor and the Black Sea region, waging several hard-fought but ultimately unsuccessful wars (the Mithridatic Wars) to break Roman dominion over Asia and the Hellenic world. He has been called the greatest ruler of the Kingdom of Pontus. Further annexations by Rome, in particular of the Kingdom of Pontus by Pompey, brought all of Anatolia under Roman control, except for the southeastern frontier with the Parthian Empire, which remained unstable for centuries, causing a series of military conflicts that culminated in the Roman–Parthian Wars (54 BC – 217 AD).

=== From Constantine to Phocas: 324 to 602 AD ===
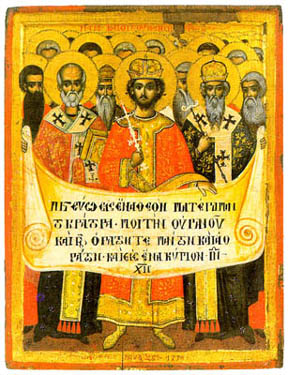
An Orthodox icon representing Constantine the Great as a saint together with Christian bishops at the First Council of Nicaea in 325 CE, holding the Nicene Creed.

Anatolia's prosperity largely continued during the reign of Constantine the Great and his successors. The Anatolian peninsula would see part of the conflict between Constantine and his rival Licinius at the Battle of Chrysopolis, but on the whole the region would see little of the chaos that wracked other parts of the Empire during the next few centuries.

The first major disruption of this peace was the Anastasian War during the reign of Anastasius I Dicorus. The border city of Theodosiopolis was sacked by the forces of the Sassanid Empire under Kavad I. Several other cities such as Amida and Martyropolis were also sacked during this time, but the bulk of the carnage was confined to the easternmost part of Anatolia, as the main focus of the war was Armenia. The Sassanid Empire, the largest opposing power to that of Byzantium in the region, would not make a determined effort to conquer Anatolia until the seventh century. Anatolia would occasionally receive the spillover of wars between Byzantium and Persia such as the Iberian War or Lazican War, but the region would never be directly threatened.

=== Heraclian dynasty and the Barbarian invasions ===
Arab Muslim invasions in the Sassanid Empire and Byzantine Syria (620–630)

=== Byzantine–Sasanian wars ===
In 602 AD, the Byzantine Emperor Maurice was overthrown by the usurper known as Phocas. Maurice had previously been instrumental in the accession of Khosrow II to the Sassanid throne as Emperor, and upon his usurpation, Khosrow declared war with the casus belli of avenging Maurice. Phocas was successful in keeping the war out of Anatolia. However, in 608, Heraclius, the son of a governor of Carthage by the same name, launched a revolt against Phocas, which weakened the eastern frontier. Heraclius was successful in overthrowing Phocas in 610, but in 611, the Persians succeeded in breaking through the Armenian frontier and invading Anatolia proper. Over the next four years, forces under the generals Shahrbaraz and Shahin defeated the Byzantines in several key battles, taking control of the southeastern part of Anatolia, known as Cilicia and eventually opening the way to lay siege to Chalcedon on the northwestern coast. in 617, Chalcedon itself fell. Rejecting a peace delegation sent by Heraclius, Shahin withdrew from Anatolia for the present to continue the war on other fronts, namely Egypt and Syria.

In 622 AD, driven to desperation by shocking failures to hold onto classically Roman provinces such as Egypt as well as Khosrow's refusal to accept a peace settlement, Heraclius took direct control over the Byzantine army and began to pursue an offensive strategy. Leading his men to Cappadocia, Heraclius engaged and defeated a Persian army under Shahrbaraz, forcing them out of Anatolia and winning a much needed victory. Heraclius was interrupted from continuing by an attack by the Pannonian Avars, who threatened the empire's holding in Thrace. For the next two years, Heraclius retreated to deal with the problem in Thrace. Returning in 624, Heraclius renewed his offensive campaign by attacking through Armenia into the Sassanid heartland of the Persian Plateau. For the next four years, Heraclius continued to push the offensive against the Persians, not even returning to defend Constantinople when it was attacked by the Pannonian Avars and Persian forces in 626. Heraclius's continued offensives, combined with the failure to conquer Constantinople and suspected intrigues against Shahrbaraz, eventually brought about the fall of Khosrow II and the elevation of his son, Kavad II in 628 CE. Within a month, Kavad surrendered to the Byzantine Empire and ordered his forces to withdraw from all Byzantine territory, including Anatolia. Heraclius had succeeded in defeating Persia and safeguarding Anatolia, but the peace was illusory.

=== Arab Muslim invasions ===
In 633, the Arab Muslim forces under the Rashidun Caliphate began their first attacks against the frontiers of the Byzantine Empire. At first only consisting of minor raids, the Arabs won a major victory at the Battle of Yarmuk in 636. After the battle, Heraclius made the decision to withdraw his armies from Syria into Anatolia via the Taurus Mountains. This opened the way for the forces of the Caliphate to take over Byzantine Syria by the year 638 In 641, the Arabs began the Muslim invasion of Egypt, which they had occupied by 645. The loss of so much territory so quickly caused Heraclius to sink into depression, and he died later that year, becoming, in the judgement of English historian John Julius Norwich, "the man who lived too long."

The loss of Egypt and Syria would prove catastrophic for the Byzantine Empire, but would dramatically heighten the importance of Anatolia. Previously, Egypt had been the main source of food and wealth for the empire, mainly due to the fertile lands watered by the Nile River. With Egypt gone, Anatolia would become the main source of money, men, and food for the empire. Anatolia's peace was dealt a mortal blow by these staggering losses. In the late 640s under the caliph known as Mu'awiya I, the Arabs launched raids into Anatolia, advancing to Amorium and Cappadocia. This would be the first in a series of raids into Anatolia that would last for hundreds of years. The desperate straits of the empire at this time caused a massive shift in strategic thinking for the Byzantines. For the next two centuries they would cease being an empire of conquest, of which they were largely incapable at the moment.

=== Introduction of the thematic system ===
Constantly menaced by the Arabs to the east, the Bulgars and Pannonian Avars to the north, and by the Lombards in the Italian Peninsula, the Byzantine Empire shifted its armies away from the classical structure of the Roman legions to a new system known as the themata, or "themes" in English. The exact date of this shift is unclear, but seems to have taken place during the reign of Emperor Constans II. Anatolia was reorganized into several themes. Each theme was governed by a strategos (general) who functioned both as a commander of the Byzantine military forces in the area and a political governor of the geographic area covered by his theme.

These thematic troops utilized asymmetric warfare and guerilla warfare tactics to defend against constant Arab raids into Anatolia for hundreds of years. Rather than attempting to defeat Arab armies head on, the troops would often ambush plunder laden Arab raiding parties as they made their way back out of Anatolia in the hope of retaking some plunder and deterring further Arab raids. The empire simply lacked the strength to go on the offensive at this time.

Territories of the Byzantine Empire in 650 AD

The seven themata in Anatolia (c. 750 AD)

=== The first siege of Constantinople and Justinian II ===
Constans's son Constantine IV (668–685 AD) had been made co-emperor in 654, and ruled in the east while his father campaigned in the west (662–668), succeeding him on the latter's death. In 646, almost immediately he had to deal with Arab attacks on Amorium in Phrygia and Chalcedon in Bithynia. This was followed by the capture of Cyzicus in Mysia (670), as well as Smyrna and other coastal cities, finally attacking Constantinople in 674. This first siege of Constantinople demonstrated how vulnerable the city was to attack, but also its strengths which ultimately prevailed, the Arabs lifting the siege in 678, and after further setbacks signing another truce which allowed Constantine to concentrate on the Balkan threat. For a long time the Danube in the Balkans had been considered the frontier that must be defended to maintain the integrity of Thrace. Now a new Turkic threat, the Bulgars crossed the Danube and inflicted heavy losses on the Byzantine forces in 681. Faced with the uncompromising religious controversy that had perplexed his father he convened another ecumenical council, the sixth (Third Council of Constantinople) in 680, which condemned Monotheletism. He also initiated a series of civil and military reform to cope with the shrunken and threatened empire. This was to do away with the original system of provinces with a new administrative structure based on themata (themes), the remaining parts of Anatolia being divided amongst seven themata. When he died in 668 he was succeeded by his son, Justinian II (685–695, 705–711), co-emperor since 681.

Justinian was an ambitious ruler eager to emulate his illustrious ancestor, Justinian I. However his more limited resources and despotic nature ultimately proved his downfall as the last of the Heraclians. Initially he was able to continue his father's successes in the east leaving him free to concentrate on the Balkans where he was also successful. He then returned to the east but was soundly defeated at the Battle of Sebastopolis in 692. Theologically he pursued non-orthodox thinking and convened another council in Constantinople. in 692. Domestically he continued the organisation of the themata, however his land and taxation policies met with considerable opposition, eventually provoking a rebellion led by Leontios (695–698) in 695, which deposed and exiled him, precipitating a series of events that led to a prolonged period of instability and anarchy, with seven emperors in twenty-two years.

Leontios proved equally unpopular and was in turn overthrown by Tiberios III (698–705). Tiberios managed to bolster the eastern frontier and reinforced the defences of Constantinople, but meanwhile Justinian was conspiring to make a comeback, and after forming an alliance with the Bulgars succeeded in taking Constantinople and executing Tiberios.

Justinian then continued to reign for a further six years (705–711). His treatment of Tiberios and his supporters had been brutal and he continued to rule in a manner that was despotic and cruel. He lost the ground regained by Tiberios in the east, and imposed his views on the pope. However, before long he faced a rebellion led by Philippikos Bardanes (711–713. Justinian was captured and executed as was his son and co-emperor, Tiberius (706–711), thus extinguishing the Heraclian line. Justinian had taken the Byzantine Empire yet further from his origins. He effectively abolished the historical role of consul, merging it with emperor, thus strengthening the emperors' constitutional position as absolute monarch.

=== The non-dynastic years of anarchy 711–717 ===
The years 711 to 717 were a troublesome time between the two dynasties, Heraclian and Isaurian and reflect a loss of leadership that had occurred under Justinian II, and could equally be dated from his first deposition in 695.

Philipikos' rebellion extended beyond politics to religion, deposing the patriarch, reestablishing monothelitism and overturning the Sixth Ecumenical Council, which in turn alienated the empire from Rome. Militarily the Bulgars reached the walls of Constantinople, and moving troops to defend the capital allowed the Arabs to make incursions in the east. His reign ended abruptly when an army rebellion deposed him and replaced him with Anastasius II (713–715).

Anastasius reversed his predecessor's religious policies and responded to Arab attacks by sea and land, this time reaching as far as Galatia in 714, with some success. However the very army that had placed him on the throne (the Opsikion army) rose against him, proclaimed a new emperor and besieged Constantinople for six months, eventually forcing Anastasius to flee.

The troops had proclaimed Theodosius III (715–717) as the new emperor, and once he had overcome Anastasius was almost immediately faced with the Second Arab siege of Constantinople (717–718), forcing him to seek assistance from the Bulgars. He in turn faced rebellion from two other themata, Anatolikon and Armeniakon in 717, and chose to resign, being succeeded by Leo III (717–741) bringing an end to the cycle of violence and instability.

It was surprising that the Byzantine Empire was able to survive, given its internal conflicts, the speedy collapse of the Sassanid Empire under Arab threat, and it was being threatened simultaneously on two fronts. However the strength of the military organisation within the empire, and factional struggles within the Arab world enabled this situation.

=== Iconoclasm: Isaurian dynasty 717–802 ===
Byzantine Empire 717. 1. Ravenna 2. Venetia and Istria 3. Rome 4. Naples 5. Calabria 6. Hellas 7. Thrace 8. Opsikion 9. Thrakesion 10. Anatolikon 11. Karabisianoi 12. Armeniakon. Hatched area: Frequently invaded

Leo III (717–741), a general from Isauria, restored order and stability to the empire, and the dynasty he founded, known as the Isaurians, was to last for nearly a century.

==== Leo III 717–741 ====
Having overthrown Theodosius, the first problem Leo faced was the Arab siege of Constantinople, which was abandoned in 718, Leo having continued his predecessors alliance with the Bulgars. His next pressing task was to consolidate his power to avoid being himself deposed and to restore order in the face of the chaos that had ensued from the years of civil strife. And indeed the need to do so became clear in 719 when the deposed Anastasius II led an unsuccessful rebellion against him. Anastasius was executed. He then needed to secure the frontiers. In terms of domestic policies he embarked on a series of civil and legal reforms. The latter included a new codification in 741, referred to as the Ekloge ton nomon, which unlike Justinian's Corpus on which it was based, was in Greek rather than in Latin. Administratively he subdivided a number of the themata, for reasons similar to that of his predecessors, smaller units meant less power to local officials and less threat to central authority.

When Leo died he was succeeded by his son, Constantine V (741–775).

==== Iconclasm 730–842 ====
One of the most significant influences of Leo III was his involvement with the Iconoclastic movement in about 726. This controversy, the removal and destruction of religious icons in favour of simple crosses, and the persecution of icon worshippers was to have a profound effect on the empire, its religion and culture over most of the next century before being finally laid to rest in 842. Leo's exact role has been debated An opponent of image worship has been referred to as an εἰκονοκλάστης (iconoclast), while those supporting image worship have been variously described as εἰκονολάτραι (iconolaters), εἰκονόδουλοι (iconodules) or εἰκονόφιλοι (iconophiles).

The traditional view was that Leo III issued an edict ordering the removal of images in 726, followed by prohibiting the veneration of images, but the controversy had existed in the church for some time and received some impetus from the rise of proximity of Islam and its attitude to imagery. The iconoclastic movement in the east considerably exacerbated the rift between it and the western church. The first phase of iconoclasm coincided with the Isaurian dynasty, from the edict of Leo III to Irene and the Second Council of Nicaea (Seventh Ecumenical Council) in 787. Iconoclasm was then revived by Leo V, and it persisted until 842 in the reign of Michael III (842–867) and regency of Theodora.

==== Leo's successors 741–802 ====
Constantine V (741–775) had a less successful reign than his father, for no sooner had he ascended the throne than he was attacked and defeated by his brother in law, Artabasdos who proceeded to seize the title resulting in civil war between the forces of the two emperors, who had divided the themata between them. However Constantine managed to overcome his adversary by 743. The conflict was at least in part one over icons, Artabasdos being supported by the iconodule faction.

Under Constantine, Iconoclasm became further entrenched following the Council of Hieria in 754, followed by a concerted campaign against the iconodules and the suppression of monasteries which tended to be the centre of iconophilia. He continued his father's reorganisation of the themata and embarked on aggressive and expensive foreign wars against both the Arabs and Bulgars. He died campaigning against the latter, being succeeded by his son, Leo IV.

Asia Minor 780 showing administrative boundaries

Leo IV (775–780) also had to put down uprisings, in his case his half-brothers. His marriage epitomised the conflict in Byzantine society over icons, raised an iconoclast himself, he married Irene an iconodule, resulting in a more conciliatory policy. Like his predecessors he had to defend his borders against both Arab and Bulgar, and like his father died campaigning against the Bulgars.

When Leo died his son, Constantine VI (780–797) was coemperor but only nine years old, and reigned with his mother Irene as regent. An unpopular ruler even after gaining majority, he was engaged in power struggles with his mother, who had been declared empress. Eventually his mother's supporters deposed him, leaving her as sole empress.

Irene (797–802), therefore was empress consort (775–780), empress dowager and regent (780–797) and empress regnant (797–80). As sole empress she was able to officially restore icon veneration during her regency in 787 by means of the Seventh Ecumenical Council, although unofficially this had been the case since 781. A female head of state was not acceptable to the western church who promptly crowned an alternative emperor (Charlemagne) in 800 further deepening the rift between east and west. With Irene ended the Isaurian dynasty when she was deposed by a patrician conspiracy.

=== Nikephorian dynasty 802–813 ===
Following the deposition of Irene, there was founded a relatively short-lived dynasty for the era, the Nikephorian dynasty. The empire was in a weaker and more precarious position than it had been for a long time and its finances were problematic. During this era Byzantium was almost continually at war on two frontiers which drained its resources, and like many of his predecessors, Nikephoros (802–811) himself died campaigning amongst the Bulgars to the north. Furthermore, Byzantium's influence continued to wane in the west with the formation of a new empire in the west under Charlemagne (800–814) in 800.

==== Nikephoros I 802–811 ====
Nikephoros had been the empire's finance minister and on Irene's deposition immediately embarked on a series of fiscal reforms. His administrative reforms included re-organisation of themata. He survived a civil war in 803 and like most of the Byzantine emperors, he found himself at war on three fronts, suffered a major defeat at the Battle of Krasos in Phrygia in 805 and died on a campaign against the Bulgarians.

==== Nikephoros' successors 811–813 ====
On Nikephoros' death, he was succeeded by his son and coemperor, Staurakios (811). However he was severely wounded in the same battle in which his father died, and after much controversy regarding the succession was persuaded to abdicate later that year by his sister's husband, Michael I (811–813), who succeeded him.

Michael I pursued more diplomatic than military solutions, however having survived the battle against Krum of Bulgaria that took the lives of his two predecessors, he engaged Krum once more and once more was defeated, severely weakening his position. Aware of a likely revolt he chose to abdicate given the grisly fate of so many prior overthrown emperors, ending the brief dynasty of Nikephoros.

=== Leo V and the Phrygians 820–867 ===
The Nikephorian dynasty was overthrown by a general, Leo V (813–820), suspected of treachery in the Battle of Versinicia (813) in which the Byzantines under Michael I were routed by the Bulgarians. Leo had already played a checkered role in imperial politics, rewarded by Nikephoros I for switching sides in the 803 civil war, and possibly later punished for a subsequent transgression, he had been appointed Governor of the Anatolic theme from which he was able to orchestrate Michael's downfall and his own succession.

==== Leo V 813–820 ====
Leo's first task was to deal with the Bulgarian situation, who now occupied most of Thrace and were blockading Constantinople. Eventually he was able to conclude a peace treaty in 815, to the long-running Byzantine–Bulgarian wars.

In religious matters, despite early evidence of image veneration, he adopted iconoclasm, this precipitating the second phase of the divisive controversy (814–842). He appears to have been motivated by the observation that the return of image veneration coincided with a period of untimely ends of emperors. He made this official through the Council of Constantinople in 815.

His downfall was the jailing of one of his generals, Michael the Amorian, on suspicion of conspiracy. Michael then organised the assassination of Leo, and assumed power as Michael II (820–829).

==== Phrygian (Amorian) dynasty 820–867 ====
The interlude of Leo V was followed by yet another short-lived dynasty, variously referred to as the Phrygian or Amorian dynasty after Michael II, who like Leo came from Amorium (Phrygia), the capital of the Anatolic Theme.

===== Michael II 820–829 =====
Anatolia 842

No sooner had Michael deposed Leo, than he was confronted with revolt by a fellow military commander, Thomas the Slav, who claimed the throne. The ensuing civil war dragged on until 824, including a siege of Constantinople, when Thomas was defeated and killed. Michael continued the iconoclastic policy of Leo. After his death, he was succeeded by his son and coemperor, Theophilos (829–842).

===== Theophilus 829–842 =====
Theophilus was now faced with a flare-up of the Byzantine–Arab wars, the Arab forces once again demonstrating their ability to penetrate deep into Anatolia and inflict significant losses on the Byzantine, if short lived, and vice versa. A significant Arab triumph was the sacking of the dynastic homeland of Amorium in 838. When he died in 842, he was succeeded by his son Michael III (842–867).

===== The demise of iconoclasm: Michael III 842–867 =====
Michael III however was only two years old, so effective control fell to his mother, Theodora as regent (842–856). In 856 she was deposed from the regency with at least the acquiescence of Michael, by his uncle Bardas, who became very influential, and was eventually appointed Caesar that year. Another influential figure was Basil the Macedonian.

Theodora, like her predecessor Irene lost no time in putting an end to the iconoclastic movement once and for all.

During his reign important administrative reforms and reconstruction were undertaken.

Michael's reign included the usual wins and losses on the Arab front. However, despite Leo V's treaty with the Bulgarians of 815, the empire was once again at war in the Balkans in 855. However the subsequent conversion of the Bulgarians to Christianity and the peace of 864 brought a long lasting lull in the Bulgarian wars. A new threat emerged further north in 860 with the appearance of the Kievan Rus' and subsequent Rus'–Byzantine wars of 860.

Basil then arranged to murder Bardas in 866, and was adopted by Michael and crowned co-emperor a few months later. Michael and Basil were entangled in a complex sexual melange involving Michael's mistress Eudokia Ingerina, and his sister Thekla. Michael also appointed, or announced he was going to appoint as co-emperor, Basiliskianos. This so alarmed Basil, in terms of potentially threatening the line of succession of which he was now the direct heir, that he had both Michael and Basiliskianos murdered, and ascended the throne as Basil I (867–886).

=== Macedonian dynasty 867–1056 ===
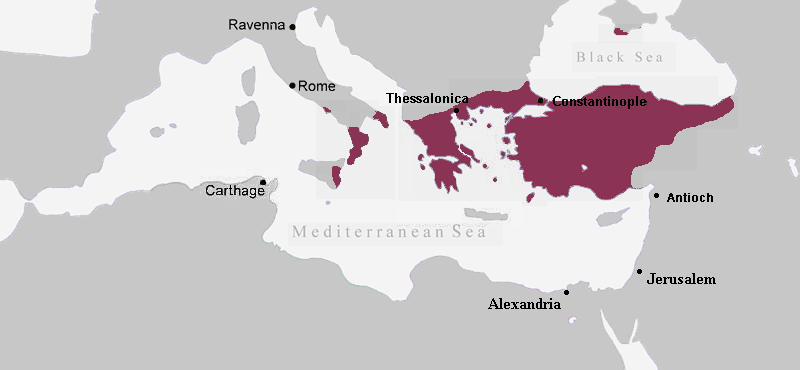
The Byzantine Empire, c. 867

The last Amorian emperor, Michael III "the Drunkard", was murdered by Basil I the Macedonian in 867. Basil's dynasty would be known as Macedonian Dynasty and would see the Empire as a whole enter a new renisance and in particular would bring peace to Anatolia for the first time since the Arab conquests over the next hundred years. The first military success for the new emperor in Anatolia was the defeat of the Paulicians in 873, who had been raiding western cities such as Nicaea and Ancyra. Basil's raid left only a few Paulicians in hiding at Tephrike, which was soon smashed in 879. Basil also campaigned against the Arab emirate of Tarsus in the same year, defeating them at Adana and continuing on to Germanicea and upper Mesopotamia. However, the death of Basil's son Constantine profoundly affected the emperor, who went into a depression. A further attack against Melitene in 882 ended in a defeat. Basil managed to make an alliance with Armenia that brought a measure of safety to the east of Asia Minor. Basil died in 886 and was succeeded by Leo VI.

Leo's military record had a fairly unimpressive start. In 897, the emirate of Tarsus was able to sack the headquarters of the Theme of Cappadocia at Çorum. Additionally, the Armenian allies had to deal with a separate Arab invasion that weakened their position against the Arabs. Combined with other difficulties, Leo was unable to make progress in Anatolia until 900, when he launched a new offensive against Tarsus. This campaign was successful, culminating in the capture of the emir of Tarsus and weakening the emirate. The next few years saw more offensives that gradually weakened the Arab presence in the east and allowed the empire to make its first eastern conquests in years. The empire's grip on Anatolia was stronger at Leo's death than it had been in a long time.

== Ending the raids ==
In the tenth century, Byzantium gradually began regaining strength it had previously lost. On the eastern frontier, this meant a gradual pushing back of Arab power. The first major blow was struck by John Kourkouas and his sacking of the city of Melitene.

=== Reconquest 961-1025 ===
In 961, the general Nikephoros Phokas retook the island of Crete for the empire. This was the beginning of an era of reconquest for Byzantium and would extend its eastern frontiers to a length that had been unseen since 634. The main obstacle to Byzantine expansion was the emir of Aleppo, one Sayf al-Dawla. At first, al-Dawla was able to contain Byzantine forces until a disastrous ambush by the general Leo Phokas the Younger, brother of Nikephoros, routed al-Dawla's armies and almost completely destroyed the Arab forces. Over the next two years, the region of Cilicia was subjected to multiple campaigns led by Nikephoros. The campaign ended in 962 with the Sack of Aleppo (962), which dealt a major blow to Sayf al-Dawla. By 965, Cilica was entirely back in Byzantine hands. al-Dawla faced continuous revolts for the rest of his reign that stymied his ability to fight back. The campaign of reconquest continued and culminated in 969 with the retaking of Antioch by Byzantine forces.

The reconquest was due to several reasons. For one, the Abbasid Caliphate was in a fractured state at the time, facing multiple internal issues and the rise of the rival Fatimid Caliphate. This meant the caliphate was unable to offer a tangible response to Byzantine aggression. Furthermore, once Sayf al-Dawla was defeated, there was no other Arab state in the immediate region to slow the Byzantine efforts. Finally, Arab raids on the empire had ceased long ago, giving the Byzantines time to assemble a powerful army.

In 969, Nikephoros was overthrown by his subordinate, John I Tzimiskes. Tzimiskes proved to be just as capable and active as Nikephoros. Aleppo soon submitted to the empire and became a Roman vassal, while remaining a Muslim state. This was an unprecedented development that further strengthened Anatolia's southern borders and demonstrated the new power of Byzantium. Tzimiskes continued the offensive with campaigns into Mesopotamia and into Syria against the Fatimid Caliphate. By 975, Tzimiskes had campaigned far south into the Levant and Syria, pushing the borders away from Anatolia and extending Byzantine hegemony into Syria. Tzimiskes' strengthening of the armies also blunted the only serious attempt to take Antioch in 971.

While neither Tzimiskes nor Phokas had a unified strategy, their conquests tended to be territory that either posed a direct threat to Byzantine territory in Asia Minor, such as Cilcia, or territory that had a large Christian population such as Antioch. These territories, along with the vassalization of Aleppo, secured Anatolia from southern incursion and prevented any Muslim attempts to raid Anatolia from the south. Initially, it seemed that the empire would resume a defensive posture. However, the next emperor, Basil II, would soon address the north eastern borders of Anatolia.

=== Prelude to Manzikert ===
The Macedonian dynasty came to an end with the death of Theodora in 1056, who had no children or heirs to replace her. After a brief succession of emperors, she was replaced by Constantine X Doukas. To the east, a new threat had slowly been emerging. The Seljuk Turks had coalesced into a powerful force united under the sultan Alp Arslan. In 1064, the first major Turkish raid crossed over into Armenia and Anatolia, seizing the city of Ani from Byzantium. Yet Constantine did not react. He sent no armies to contest the Turkish raids. There is a lack of sources for his reign and thus the reason for this lack of reaction are unclear. In fact, it seems that Constantine may have actually weakened the armies that should have been defending the frontiers. By 1067, the frontiers were in bad shape and decisive action was needed.

== The Battle of Manzikert and the Crusades ==
=== Manzikert ===
In 1068, the emperor Constantine X Doukas died with only two children who had not come to maturity to succeed him. His wife, the empress Eudokia Makrembolitissa, married a disgraced noble, Romanos IV Diogenes, to become the new Emperor. Diogenes recognized the crumbling situation in Anatolia and quickly assembled an army to reverse it and push out the Seljuk Turks. For the next three years, Romanos campaigned against them, winning back some fortresses and pushing against them. He hoped to administer a fatal blow in 1071. Gathering an army of 40,000 men, Diogenes retook the town of Manzikert from the Seljuks with the intent of defeating the Sultan, Alp Arslan. However, Arslan was much closer to the town than Diogenes anticipated, and launched a surprise attack. Owing both to this and to his appointment of the questionably loyal Andronikos Doukas who deserted him on the battlefield, Diogenes was defeated and became the first emperor since Valerian to be captured alive. Alp Arslan was kind to Diogenes and released him eight days later, but his rivals in Constantinople moved against him. Diogenes was soon deposed, and after a brief civil war he was blinded and died. His replacement, Michael VII, was seen as a weak emperor who was unfit for the job.

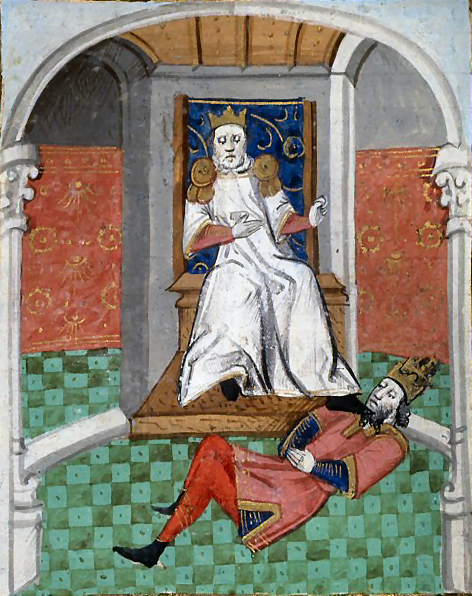
Alp Arslan humiliating Emperor Romanos IV. From a 15th-century illustrated French translation of Boccaccio's De Casibus Virorum Illustrium.

=== The Crisis of the Normans and the Turks ===
Weak leadership at the top would lead to civil war and a poor response to the waves of incoming Turks who now entered Anatolia. The exact timeline is unclear due in part to a lack of sources during this time. For the year of 1072, the Byzantines did not have to deal with an organized invasion by the Seljuks, but in 1073, an attempt to stabilize Anatolia would end in disaster. One of the leaders, Roussel de Bailleul, a Norman, led a group of his fellow mercenaries away east to Melitene from the main expedition. The absence of Roussel would in part lead to the expedition's defeat at Caesarea. Roussel went on to attempt to create his own state in the center of Anatolia. In 1074, the empire sent an army against him led by Ioannes Doukas and Andronikos Doukas. The expedition was routed by Roussel at the Sangarios River. This defeat broke the Byzantines' ability to recapture Asia Minor and would be the last army to move inland in Anatolia before the First Crusade. Roussel would march on Constantinople itself and attempt to set up a puppet emperor of his own, Ioannes Doukas, who had been taken prisoner at Sangarios. Turning to a Turkish mercenary named Artuk Bey to defeat Roussel, the Byzantines were able to drive his army away from the capital and capture him. However, Roussel's wife was able to reach Artuk before the Empire and was able to ransom Roussel. Roussel now retreated to the Armeniakon theme and resumed his ambitions. In 1075, the imperial court sent a new general, Alexios I Komnenos to apprehend him. He was successful, and in 1076 he captured Roussel and returned to the capital. The wars with Roussel only served to expose the weakness of Roman presence within Anatolia, and throughout the decade, many Romans fled westwards away from the Turks. The combined threat of the Seljuks and the Normans had simply overwhelmed Roman capabilities to defend Anatolia from further incursion, and the 1080s would witness the near destruction of Byzantine Anatolia.

=== The Komnenian Restoration and the First Crusade ===
In 1081, Alexios Komnenos successfully led a coup against the government and became emperor. Alexios was a capable general and leader, but before he could deal with the situation in Anatolia, his attention was drawn westward by another Norman invasion and incursions by the Pechenegs into the Balkans. Alexios entrusted several cities to Turkish mercenaries such as Nicaea, but this strategy backfired on him when the Turks betrayed him and kept the cities for themselves. By 1095, the empire was reduced to only barely holding the coast with the Bosporus sea. Alexios now turned westward, working with Pope Urban II in the formation of a new kind of warfare: the crusade. Over the next two years, western armies from France, Normandy, and Italy responded to Urban's call, arriving one by one to Constantinople. These were led by several leaders such as Raymond IV of Toulouse. The most important, however, would be Bohemond of Taranto, an old rival of Alexios.

In 1097, the Crusaders launched an attack against Nicea. Before the city could be sacked, Alexios was able to negotiate a surrender by the city's Turkish garrison and a return of the city into Byzantine hands. The Crusaders then marched eastwards through Anatolia. They were opposed by the Turks at Dorylaeum. The Crusaders were able to defeat the Turkish armies and open the way through Anatolia. They were assisted by a Byzantine general named Tatikios who ensured the handover of several towns to Byzantine hands. In 1098, the Crusaders made their way to Antioch and laid siege to it. Capturing the city in 1099, the Crusaders left Anatolia and proceeded southward to Jerusalem. Absent from their ranks, however, was Bohemond, who stayed behind in Antioch and became a rival once more to the Byzantines.

The result of the First Crusade was a successful reconstruction of control over westernmost parts of Anatolia for the Byzantine Empire. However, the Sultanate of Rum remained on the plateau, and the Crusader States would prove to be a new threat to Byzantine power in the region. In 1108, Alexios finally defeated Bohemond, who returned to Italy, but failed to return Antioch to Byzantine hands. Byzantium was thus given a foothold from which to attempt to reassert control over all of the peninsula.

=== John II Komnenos ===
Alexios was succeeded by his son John in 1118. John continued his father's strategy of slowly taking back control over Anatolia. Contending with both the Seljuks and the Crusader states, John's strategy was one of patience, slowly chipping away at his enemies. By 1140, John had moved his eastern frontiers into central Anatolia and he was able to gain almost total control over the coasts. John was even able to launch campaigns into Syria, echoing his namesake John I Tzimiskes.

=== Manuel and the Battle of Myriokephalon ===
John was succeeded by his son Manuel Komnenos in 1143. Manuel initially pursued a similar strategy to his father and grandfather, however the political situation he inherited from them, as well as his own ambitions to restore Roman power, demanded that his attention be primarily focused outside of Anatolia in Italy, Egypt, and the Balkans. However, he did not totally abandon Anatolia, both fortifying the border and launching limited raids into the Sultanate of Rum. By 1162, Manuel and Kilij Arslan II established a truce which allowed Manuel to focus his attention elsewhere. The treaty proved to be a double edged sword, as Arslan was able to solidify his own position and defeat his rivals. Arslan gradually became more belligerent and refused to honor treaty obligations. Alarmed, Manuel quickly raised an army and marched against the Sultan, hoping to take his capital at Iconium. Manuel made serious tactical errors, however, such as failing to properly scout the way ahead of him and taking predictable routes through Anatolia. He was thus ambushed at Myriokephalon by Kilij Arslan, and his army was soon routed in a humiliating defeat reminiscent of Manzikert a century earlier. Manuel, however, was able to rally his army and avoid the fate of Romanos Diogenes, and Kilij Arslan was quick to seek a peace treaty. Manuel could thus maintain his family's gains over the years in Anatolia, but his offensive drive was finished, and he added no further territory to Byzantine Anatolia.

=== The Angeloi and disintegration of Byzantine power ===
The Komnenian dynasty declined when Manuel I died in 1180 and came to an end in 1185 with the fall of Andronikos I Komnenos. Between those five years, Byzantine Empire lost Cotyaeum and Sozopolis to Kilij Arslan II. Komnenoi was replaced by Isaac II Angelos. The primary source of attention for Isaac was a Bulgarian rebellion in the Balkans. The most notable event in Anatolia was the Third Crusade, which witnessed Frederick Barbarossa travel through Anatolia, sacking Iconium along the way and defeating the Seljuks. Unfortunately for the Empire, Isaac was an incompetent emperor who failed to defeat his enemies and alienated those who could have been his friends. He was usurped in 1195 by Alexios III Angelos. Alexios proved to be similarly incompetent and was unable to stop further advances into Anatolia by a resurgent Sultanate of Rum. In 1204, a new Byzantine state emerged in Anatolia based out of Trebizond. They were not met by any imperial response, due to the Fourth Crusade.

== The Fourth Crusade and Byzantine successor states ==
The Fourth Crusade would prove to be a grave challenge to the Byzantine Empire. The loss of a central authority figure shattered the empire, breaking it into four major successor states that each held sway over different parts of the empire. Two of these states, the Empire of Nicea and the Empire of Trebizond, would contend for the remains of the empire in Anatolia, with the Nicean Empire holding the northwestern coast and the Trapezuntine empire holding the northeastern coast.

During this crisis, Turks capitalized their gains by capturing Attaleia in 1207, and to much worse of the Nicean empire, deposed Alexios III wished to seize the power from his son-in-law, Theodore I Laskaris. His attempt involved Seljuq interference that was staved off only after Kaykhusraw I was slain in Battle of Antioch on the Meander. John III Vatatzes campaign briefly restored Tripolis on the Meander and Laodicea on the Lycus to the Empire.

Trapezuntine Empire also suffered loss as well, as Sinop was captured in 1214 and again, definitively in 1265 to Mu'in al-Din Parwana.

== The end of Byzantine Anatolia ==
Byzantine position in Anatolia declined precipitously after Reconquest of Constantinople from the Latin Empire by Emperor Michael VIII Palaiologos. His deposition and blinding of Nicean Emperor, John IV Laskaris alienated Anatolian nobilities while his excessive tax policy incentivized defection of the peasantry into Turks advancing westward caused by Mongol conquests. Theme of Mylasa and Melanoudion was lost to the Menteshe during this period.

Michael VIII successor, Andronikos II Palaiologos attempted to recover Byzantine power in Anatolia. However, his short-sighted policy caused definitive collapse of Byzantine Anatolia as he either blinded capable general that were able to drive Turks away or imprisoned his replacement out of fear being deposed by them. Furthermore, the assistance of hired mercenaries from the Catalan Company was proven to be unpayable. The Catalan mercenaries went on a destructive rampage in response. Lastly, his civil war with his own grandson worsened the situation farther.

Karasids conquered Mysia-region with Paleokastron after 1296 before captured Pergamon in 1302, Aydinids took Ephesus in 1304 and would later conquered Smyrna from 1310 to 1330, Sarukhanids took Magnesia and Thyatira in 1313 while Germiyan conquered Simav in 1328. Simultaneously, remaining Byzantine territory in Bithynia came under threat from the rising power of the Ottoman Turks under Osman I and his successor, Orhan who captured important cities of Bursa in 1326, Nicaea in 1331, and Nicomedia in 1337.

Finally, civil wars turned the attention of the Byzantine emperors inward and sapping their remaining strength. The rest of the century witnessed the consolidation of Ottoman power and the taking of the last Byzantine holdings. Scutari was captured in 1338 and Chalcedon followed in 1353.

In 1390, the fortress of Philadelphia fell to the sultan Bayezid I, who forced the emperor John VII both to be his vassal and to congratulate him upon his triumph. In 1453, the empire finally fell to the Ottomans under Mehmet II. In 1461, the Empire of Trebizond, the last Greek possession on Asia Minor, fell to the sultan as well. Thus came an end to Byzantine Anatolia and an end to over a millennium of Roman rule of Asia Minor.

== See also ==
- Byzantines
- Hellenization in the Byzantine Empire
- Romanization of Anatolia
