= Romanization of Anatolia =

Cultural adaptation in Roman Anatolia

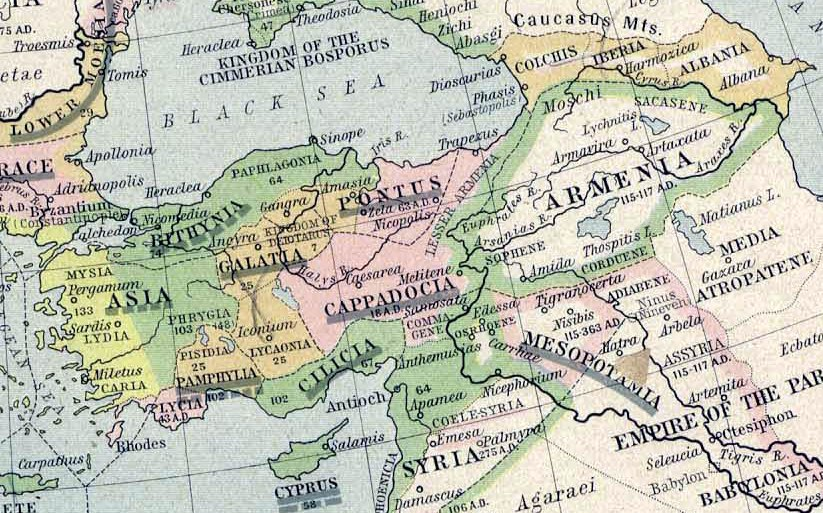
Roman Provinces in the East

The Romanization of Anatolia (modern Turkey) saw the spread of Roman political and administrative influence throughout the region of Anatolia after its Roman acquisition. The aim of Romanization in Anatolia included the change from the previously dominant cultures, such as Persian and Greek, to a more dominantly Roman presence in any one region. Romanization usually included forcing the local populaces to adopt a Roman way of life – ranging from the local laws to its political system and the impact it had on the peoples living in the region. Anatolia was largely to completely resistant to the entire overhaul of culture as its systems of government were largely Hellenic. It already had local laws and customs that were similar to the Romans thus it was impractical Romanizing it. A more complete overhaul of culture can be seen in its more western provinces which were majority Latin after the success the Romans had at Romanizing places such as Gaul.

== Pre-Roman acquisition ==
Anatolia was made up of several Hellenistic states. There were several large kingdoms in Anatolia before the Romans had started Romanizing the region. These were important to the Romanization process, as it meant that the Romans had to acquire their land at different times, and then have different policies for Romanizing. These major kingdoms were:

- The Seleucid Empire
- Kingdom of Pontus
- Kingdom of Pergamon
- Kingdom of Bithynia
- Kingdom of Cappadocia
- Galatian Celts
- Kingdom of Armenia

The Romans had a variety of ways to Romanize these kingdoms, starting with the methods in which they took their land. The process of acquiring land in Anatolia began when Attalus III of Pergamon gave his land to the Romans after his death in 133 BCE. The Bithynians also had given their land to the Romans. The Kingdom of Pontus was conquered by the Romans. This process of conquering land ended by the time of Augustus where he made the Roman province of Galatia in 23 BCE.

Hellenic culture had a deep entrenchment in the area before the Romans conquered Anatolia because the coastline had been filled with Greek city-states. This was also true of the Hellenic kingdoms that had control of the land of the central parts of the region. This was significant along the Ionian and Black Sea coasts as they had the largest Hellenic influence in the area due to its proximity to Greece itself, as compared to Rome. The Greek colonies themselves had gone through large changes in development throughout their history before the Romans entered into the region making individual City-State culturally different, as different cities had different patron deities and local practices. This is important to the Romanization process as it meant that the Romans had to adapt their strategies to pacify the different regions depending on local customs and development.

An event that happened before the Romans took full control of Anatolia was called the Asiatic Vespers, in which Mithridates organized the mass genocide of Roman citizens within his control. This acted as a casus belli for the First Mithridatic War, and included the murder of anywhere between 80,000 and 150,000 Romans. This caused the Romans to declare war to soon after. There were two large cultures in Anatolia, before the Romans. The first was the Hellenic nature of the city-states that had dotted the coastlines with the leftover Successor kingdoms like Pontus that came after Alexander the Great. The second culture was that there was also a significant amount of leftover Persian culture evident throughout the region. An important part of this Persian culture was the Royal Road, which was still in use by the Roman period. This is also evident in the different sections of Anatolia, where the Greeks had built many buildings or areas such as the Agora which were in different city-states that populated the Ionian coast like Miletus.

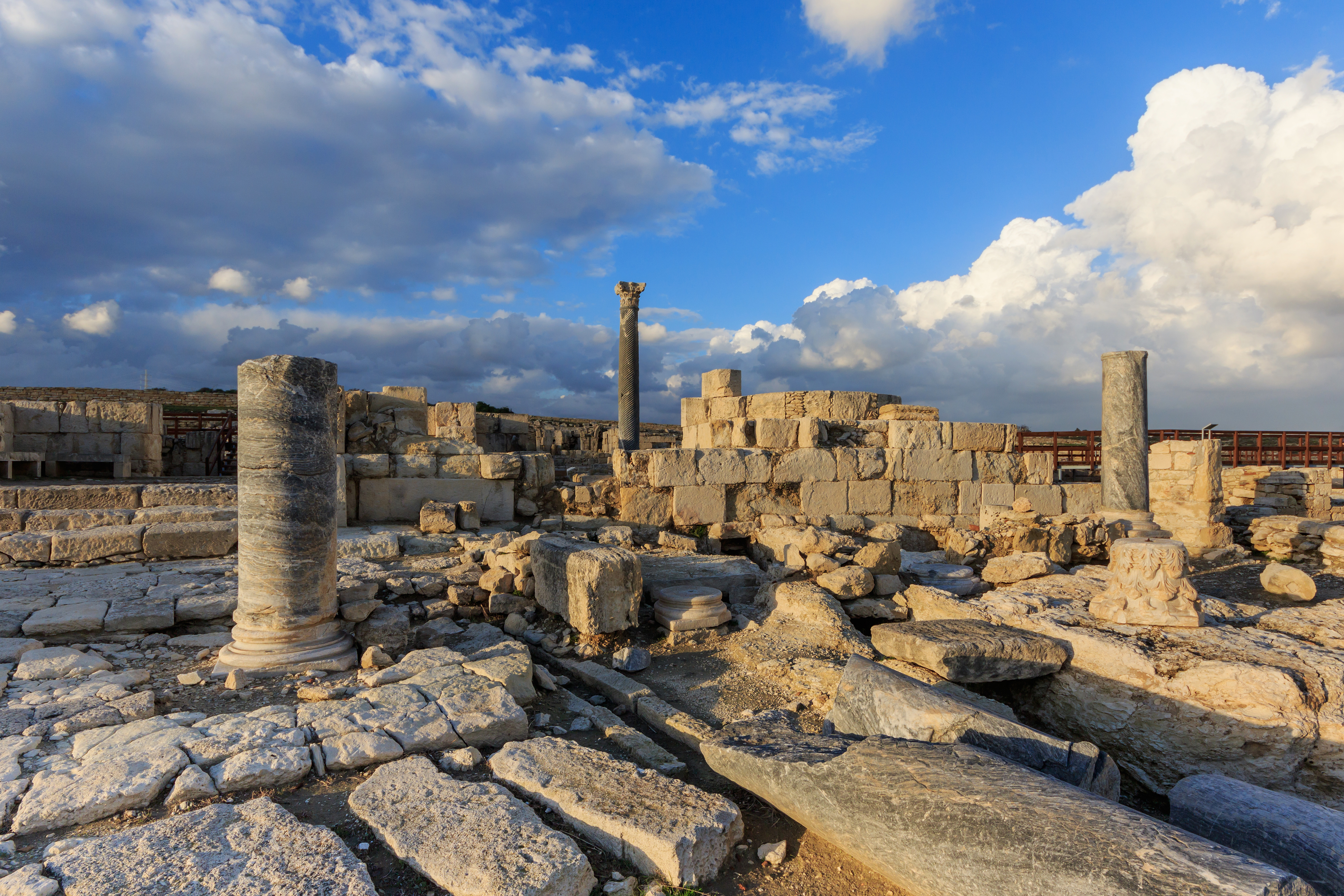
Agora on Kourion, Cyprus

== Forms of Romanization ==
The Romans had different methods of trying to culture-change a newly acquired region in order to both pacify and subjugate it. These methods include the settlement of Roman soldiers after professional service in the army as both a reward for their longtime service, as well as a means to populate local regions with Roman citizens. The reason this was effective was that it caused the spread of language and customs from the soldiers themselves to the local populace as they interacted and integrated with the locals over a long period of time. The Romans further spent large sums on money on establishing various building works in the provinces like Anatolia in order to accommodate any Romans that may be emigrating to the areas. They also expanded the existing cultural establishments in areas where applicable, like integrating local Hellenic systems into the collegia. These buildings could come in the form of converting the existing Greek Agora to the Roman forum. It also meant they would build entirely new cultural buildings, including temples or monuments to the general that had conquered the area. One of these was Pompey after he conquered large parts of central and eastern Anatolia.

Romanization could also occur militarily as the locals of any province may enlist in the Roman army as auxiliary cohorts, as a support force drawn from non-Roman citizens to accompany the Roman army. The army had varying numbers of auxiliaries depending on the time period, location of the specific legions, and where they are stationed. These auxiliary cohorts were then granted citizenship upon completing a varying amount of time in military service. This allowed for the integration of vast numbers of soldiers into the Roman military culture. Joining the army allowed for a large amount of settlement throughout the areas of empire because the soldiers ended service in varying parts of the empire. This allowed for a large amount of culture spreading throughout the empire due to the number of soldiers that were in the army.

Early 20th Century scholar Haverfield had a theory about the process of Romanization, where it consisted of two different criteria. These criteria were that the frontier defenses had to be organized against foreign attacks, and that there had to be a promotion of "internal civilization" between Rome and its various regions. This happened over a period of time, by replacing existing cultural and socio-economic systems with a more Roman friendly one. This theory was later worked on by Millet, who had the criteria of Haverfield. Millet also added the condition that Romanization contained emulation which meant the locals of any land would start to adopt Roman culture as a means to solidify their status in the new Roman society.

== Hellenic influence ==
The Greeks had been in Anatolia for hundreds of years as they had spread along the coastlines with a significant number of city-states by the time the Romans had started annexing and inheriting territory in the region. This influence was important to the Romans as well, as important mythological aspects of the Romans were also based on Greek myths. The Trojan War was an important aspect of both cultures which was based in ancient Greece and western Anatolia. This Greek culture and local laws would go on to have a dominant influence throughout the area for a long period of time as it was the main language both spoken and written in Anatolia until the end of the Byzantine era.

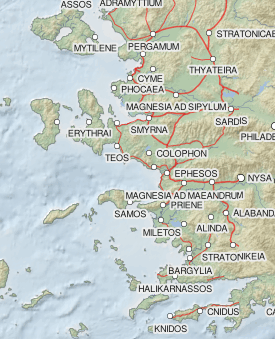
Greek city-states on the Ionian Coast

The Hellenic presence in the East had several major factors that went into its relation with the Roman culture that was trying to make itself evident after Roman expansion. One of these are the vast similarities between the two cultures religions which share a similar pantheon of gods, as well as mythology in the form of texts such as the Odyssey and the Aeneid. Even after the Romans took ownership of the land they were never able to fully Romanize (Latinize) the province as successfully as they had in the western reaches of the empire in places such as Gaul. This was due to the vast and well-established Hellenic presence and independency that was evident throughout the eastern parts of the empire that lasted well into the end of the Byzantine era which was predominantly Greek. It later became officially Greek after Diocletian had split the empire into its eastern and western components and the Byzantines had been fully realized as having separate control of the "Greek" eastern empire. However, after the Greek speaking Eastern empire gained its Independence in late antiquity Roman (Latin) influence began to fade away due to the deteriorating relations between the Greek speaking east and the more weakened Latin west. The presence of Hellenic culture in the eastern parts of the empire, especially in Anatolia as it was one of the most Hellenic places of the Roman world outside of Greece itself, was important for Rome to maintain control of their provinces. Its similarities allowed them to rule more effectively and efficiently than in other areas as it allowed important factors for everyday Roman life in the form of religious worship, city layout and local customs. This included the ability to adapt features like the Greek Agora to a Roman forum.

One of the largest Hellenic influences on Anatolia came through the Ionian coast, which had a significant number of Greek city-states along it. These city-states were important to Anatolia as it allowed trade to flow naturally between Greece and whichever power was in control of Anatolia at the time. The Romans made use of these connections, along with their own colonies in Anatolia, to further spread Roman culture, although remaining a minor influence in the region due to the already well-established Hellenic culture. They also made efforts to improve trade in the region. This connection also allowed for the use of Greece as a staging ground to launch military campaigns into Anatolia and beyond.

== Impacts on Anatolia ==
The effects that the attempts of Romanization had on Anatolia lasted centuries yet losing its importance and influence through the years. Effects that lasted up to the Ottoman conquest of the Byzantine Empire. These impacts range from areas such as the changes in local and provincial law, to the lasting cultural effects that the tolerant nature of Roman rule when Hellenic culture and civilization is present. The Roman improvements on infrastructure such as the Persian Royal Road helped lay the groundwork for the Eastern Roman Empire to function well after its western half was taken over and had become the Ostrogothic Kingdom by the end of the 5th century. The Eastern Roman Empire lasted until the Ottoman conquest of Constantinople in 1453 which demonstrates how Roman political and administrative improvements had left a significant impact on Anatolia because it had produced a stable and long lasting empire in what was later known as the Byzantine Empire. This is also shown to affect the fact that the Ottoman powers in Anatolia lasted in the intervening years between the Byzantines and the modern country of Turkey.

The Asiatic Vespers also heavily impacted Anatolia as it caused the deaths of tens of thousands of Romans which disrupted trade and commerce between Hellenic Anatolia and the western Mediterranean. This cultural event further caused the First Mithridatic War between Rome and Pontus which had large effects on both sides. It caused thousands of soldiers' deaths as well as significant amounts of resources dedicated to fighting each other, impacting Anatolia economically and militarily. Most of the fighting was in Greece as the different city-states allied themselves with either power. The most important city state during this war was Athens, who allied with the Pontics, which kept the local damage to Anatolia minimal. This was the beginning of the tensions between Pontic Anatolia and the Roman Republic, causing the later Mithridatic Wars to be fought and which ended with Rome in full control of Anatolia. It was under Roman control until the Byzantines lost it to the early Nomads Turks and later to the Ottomans over time, beginning in 1299 and ending in 1453.

The Romans ability to tolerate and give Independence to many Greek city-states, local beliefs and customs allowed for a variety of cultures and religions to survive in Anatolia under superficial Roman control. This caused the region to constantly change what religions and cultures were dominant during the Romanization process although with the Hellenic culture always keeping its dominance, as well as throughout its history under Roman control. Before Roman control it was a mix of cultures such as Greek, Egyptian and Persian. After the Romanization process, these cultures maintained until Constantine converted the east to Christianity where Hellenistic culture and early Christian culture met and fused. This caused most of the previous cultures and religions to become outlawed or Hellenized in Anatolia as the subsequent Emperors increasingly persecuted non-Christians. The impacts from the Romanization also allowed the Islamic caliphates to gain control both in Anatolia, as well as other previous Graeco-Roman lands.

However, by late antiquity, both parts of the Roman Empire began an accelerating division mainly due to the new introduced religion of Christianity and the great cultural differences between the more weakened and disorderly Latin West against the more prosperous Greek East which just now had Constantinople as its own capital that could rival Rome itself. After the complete fall of the western empire. The Ostrogothic Kingdom was founded and the lack of direct Roman (Latin) influence on its eastern parts culminated in most of the Roman (Latin) influence fading away or becoming Hellenized as the centuries progressed. This effect did not limit itself only to the Eastern parts of the empire but also in most of the western parts of the Empire, once it had been reconquered by Justinian I and the Byzantine general Belisarius, Greek speaking and eastern Popes in Rome helped more Greeks to establish themselves in Rome which culminated in most Roman traditions disappearing or mixing against the more influential Hellenic-Eastern traditions present in Rome at that time.

== See also ==
- Romanization (cultural)
- Hellenization in the Byzantine Empire
- Hellenization
- Byzantine Anatolia
