= Nicaean–Seljuk war (1225–1231) =

1225–1231 war

Nicaean–Seljuk war of 1225–1231
- Part of the Byzantine–Seljuk wars and Struggle for Constantinople
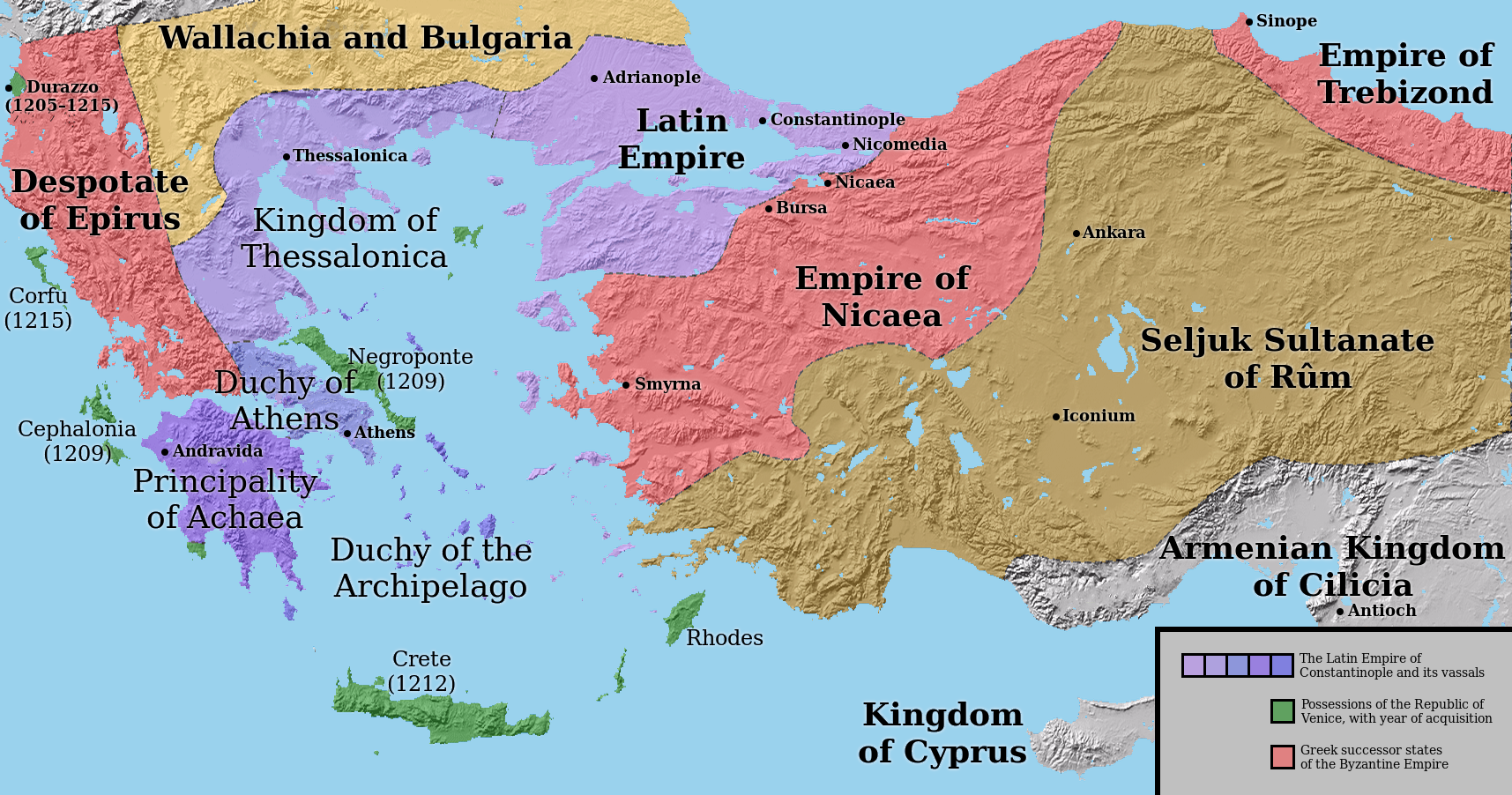
- The Empire of Nicaea and its surrounding neighbours after 1204
Date	1225–1231
Location	Western Anatolia, modern day Turkey
Result	Nicaean victory
Territorial changes	Tripolis and Laodikeia reconquered by Nicaea

Belligerents
Empire of Nicaea	Sultanate of Rum

Commanders and leaders
John III Vatatzes; Michael Strategopoulos; Alexios (POW)	Kayqubad I

Strength
18,055 (according to Germanus II)	63,000 (according to Germanus II)

The Nicaean–Seljuk war of 1225–1231 was a border war fought between the Empire of Nicaea and the Sultanate of Rum, where the Nicaean Emperor John III Vatatzes orchestrated a series of successful military campaigns pushing the Seljuks back along the Black Sea and the Sakarya–Dorylaion frontier, resulting in the stabilization of the frontier and securing vital farmlands for Nicaea.

== Background ==
Following their victory over the Seljuks at the Battle of Antioch on the Meander, the Byzantine Nicaean Empire's foreign policy reoriented toward the west and their ongoing struggle against the Latin Empire, which had occupied Constantinople since 1204. In the early 1220s, the Sultan Kayqubad I had been preoccupied with conflicts against other rivals of Rum, conquering the city of Alanya from the Cilician Armenians and conducting a successful expedition to Crimea in 1221. From 1222–1223, Kayqubad dispatched an army under Melik against the other Anatolian Byzantine successor state, the Empire of Trebizond, besieging the city. However, the endeavour ended in failure for the Seljuks, with Melik being captured by the Trapezuntines, though he was released in exchange for a peace settlement between Trebizond and Rum.

== Sources ==
After concluding peace with the Empire of Trebizond, the next target of attack for the Seljuks was the Empire of Nicaea. Information on the ensuing conflict is sparse, as the major sources for both the Nicaeans and the Seljuks offer little insight into the events. The historian George Akropolites focuses his attention on the affairs on Nicaea's western frontier, rather than its borders with Rum, while Ibn Bibi focuses on the campaigns conducted by Kayqubad I in Cilicia, Crimea and Eastern Anatolia. (Note: Ibn Bibi served as the head of the chancellery for Kayqubad I in Konya. Due to the fact ibn Bibi also does not discuss the failed Siege of Trebizond by Kayqubad, historian Juho Wilksman suspects that Bibi omitted documenting Kayqubad I's military defeats both against Trebizond and Nicaea, as his aim was to glorify the sultan in his writings.) Consequently, the most detailed narrative on the conflict survives through the works of Yaqut al-Hamawi, a historian who worked under Ayyubid rule in Aleppo. However, contemporary evidence for such a conflict exists in other sources, such as a late 13th century Arabic chronicle by Ibn Nazif, along with the propagandistic proclamation of Sultan Kayqubad I that he had campaigned against enemies of Rum in all four directions, which in the west most likely meant conflict with Nicaea. A letter from the period written by Constantinople's Patriarch Germanus II also describes a victorious battle fought by John III against the Rum.

[...] for the Church in Anatolia, and anointed as its protector a guardian with a blazing sword, the Autocrator John, united in spirit with the highest light, who now goes forth to meet face-to-face the faithless Agarenes...

A later 16th century source, the Pseudo-Sphrantzes Chronicle by Makarios Melissenos noted that the father of the Nicaean general Alexios Strategopoulos had won victories of such prestige while fighting the Seljuks in Paphlagonia, that his family was henceforth named after the Greek title of strategos.

Tradition says that the Lord John Ducas entrusted the military command of Paphlagonia to Michael [Melissenus], the father of the aforementioned Caesar Alexius. Michael was at that time extremely young. He performed manly exploits against the enemy, resulting in victories, for which he was called thereafter "Strategopulus," a name carried also on this account by his sons.

Evidence for the conflict can also be found in the 14th century hagiographical work of John III by the Metropolitan George of Pelagonia, and the even later anonymous late 18th or early 19th century hagiographical work of John III paraphrased by Nicodemus Hagiorites, as both contain long passages describing a "crusade" conducted by the emperor against the armies of Rum in the Meander Valley.

== Course of the conflict ==
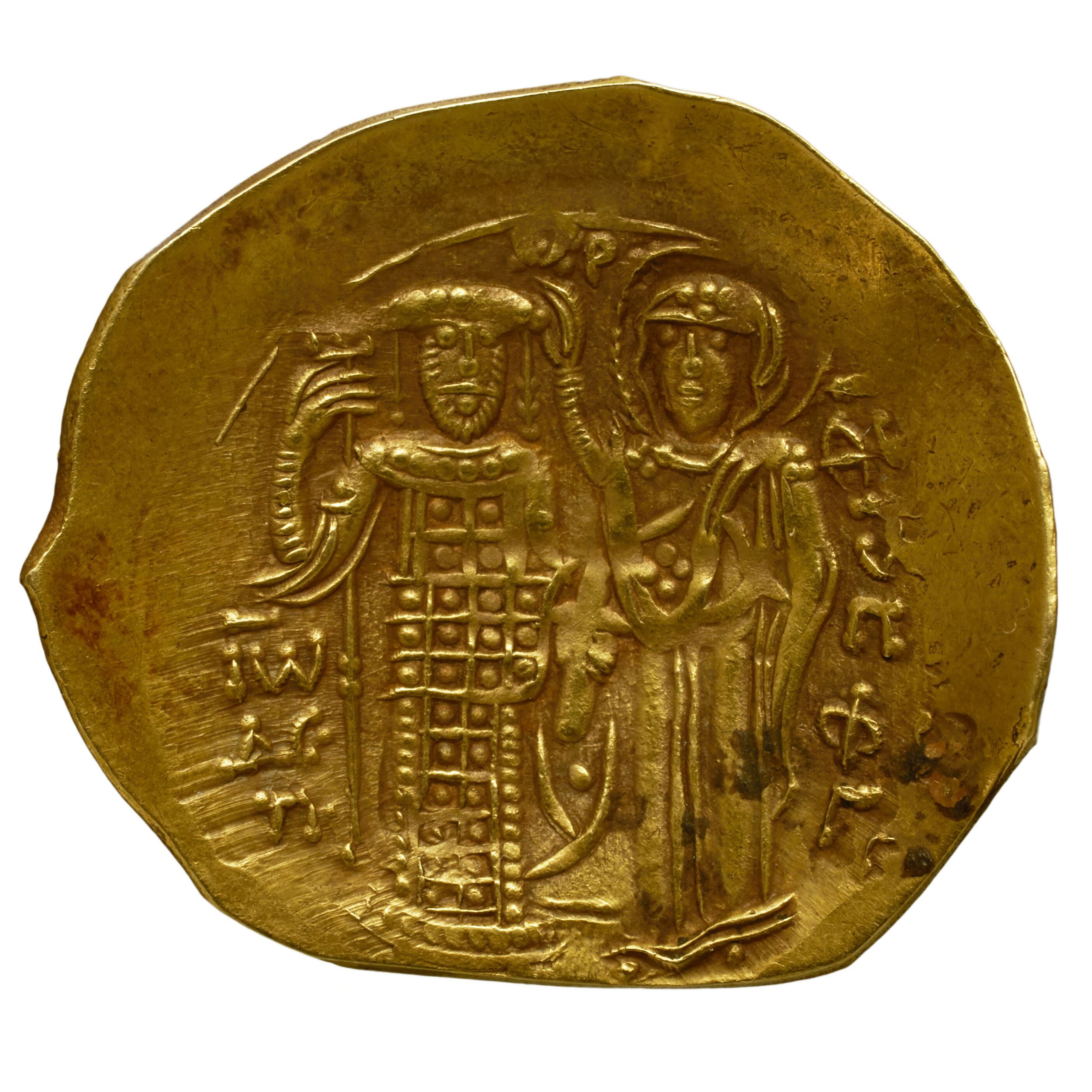
Golden hyperpyron depicting Emperor John III Vatatzes being crowned by the Panagia

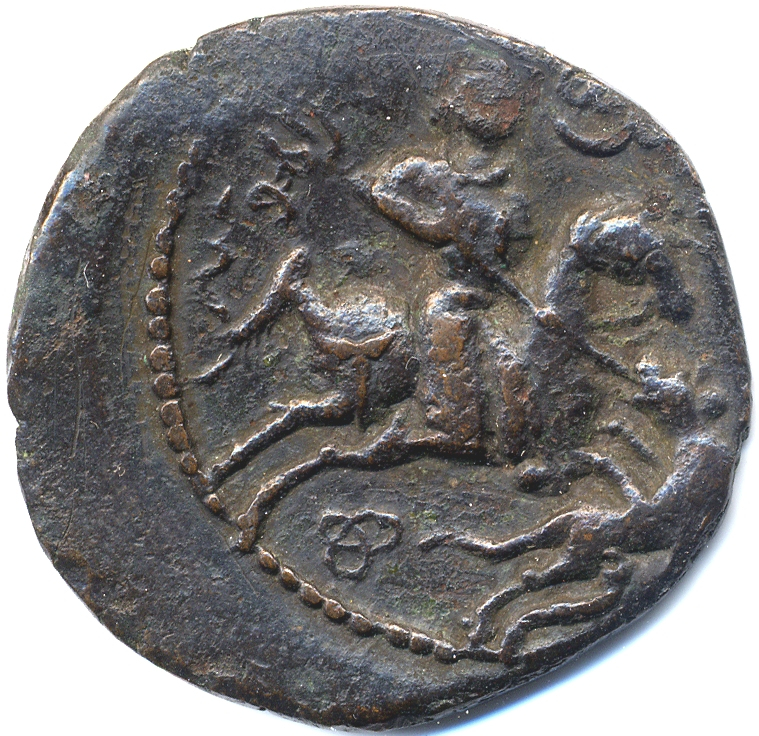
Copper fal depicting Sultan Kayqubad I on horseback slaying a beast

According to al-Hamawi's account, in 1225 Kayqubad I defeated John III Vatatzes in a battle, after which he besieged and captured some fortresses from the Nicaeans. Kayqubad may have timed his offensive to coincide with the transfer of a Nicaean army under the command of Protostrator John Ises and Megas Hetaireiarches John Kammytzes into the Haemus, in order to attack Latin-held Adrianople, which would have deprived the Nicaeans of troops on their eastern frontier. Around that time, Kayqubad also captured an otherwise unknown Byzantine nobleman named Alexios (possibly the Trapezuntine official Alexios Paktiares, suggesting forays into Trebizond's territories simultaneous with the attacks against Nicaea). However, John appears to have restored the situation soon after his initial defeat, as a fragment preserved by Nicodemus the Hagiorite reported that the emperor conducted successful warfare in the fourth year of his reign (i.e. late 1225–1226). Additionally, John III is reported to have dispatched gifts to al-Kamil in 1226, the overlord of al-Ashraf and Kayqubad's Ayyubid rival in Syria, perhaps in an attempt to apply pressure against the Seljuks' southeastern frontier.

In 1227 or 1228, Kayqubad conducted another offensive in which he invested a major Nicaean fortress. Although the sultan captured the fortress after an 8-day siege, John III arrived with a relief army shortly thereafter and confronted him. The two armies engaged in a pitched battle, and this time the forces of Rum were defeated with heavy losses, while large numbers of their fighters were captured by the Nicaeans. In 1229, Kayqubad renewed his offensive against, only to be defeated by John III again. The two sides concluded a peace two years later in 1231, likely influenced by the previous year's developments in the east: Kayqubad I, who was also waging war against Trebizond, won a decisive victory over the Khwarezmian Shah Jalal ad-Din at the Battle of Yassıçemen in 1230. However, the threat of further incursions by Turkomans and Mongols likely compelled him to conclude peace with the Nicaeans in the west. The Nicaeans may have gifted Kayqubad a donation to seal this peace in order to help the Seljuks upkeep their defences in the east against the Mongols, who were a mutual threat to both Nicaea and Rum.

The letter of Germanus II, which describes a battle at Thera (likely located in the valley of the Kaistros River), may shed additional light on one of John III's victorious battles against the Seljuks. According to Germanus, Vatatzes advanced with an army of 18,055 men, and met and defeated a Seljuk army of 63,000 on the battlefield. Supposedly, John III engaged a Seljuk nobleman in single combat from horseback. The emperor won the duel, striking the Seljuk warrior down before beheading him. When John then displayed the severed head of the warrior impaled on a pike, the Seljuk army collapsed into a rout. The emperor is said to have defeated the Seljuks in another battle during a subsequent campaign, following which the Nicaeans besieged and reconquered the fortresses of Tripolis and Laodikeia. (Note: Although John III Vatatzes recaptured Laodikeia during the conflict, it was likely reconquered by the Seljuks before 1256, as the 'Anonymous Synopsis Chronike' records that it was ceded by Sultan Kaykaus II to John III's successor, Theodore II Laskaris, in exchange for military support against the Mongols, following Kaykaus' defeat at the Battle of Aksaray.) (Note: Germanus II's retelling bears significant similarities to the earlier Battle of Antioch on the Meander in 1211, making it possible that the patriarch confused that battle with one of the Nicaean victories over the Seljuks during the reign of John III.)

== Aftermath ==
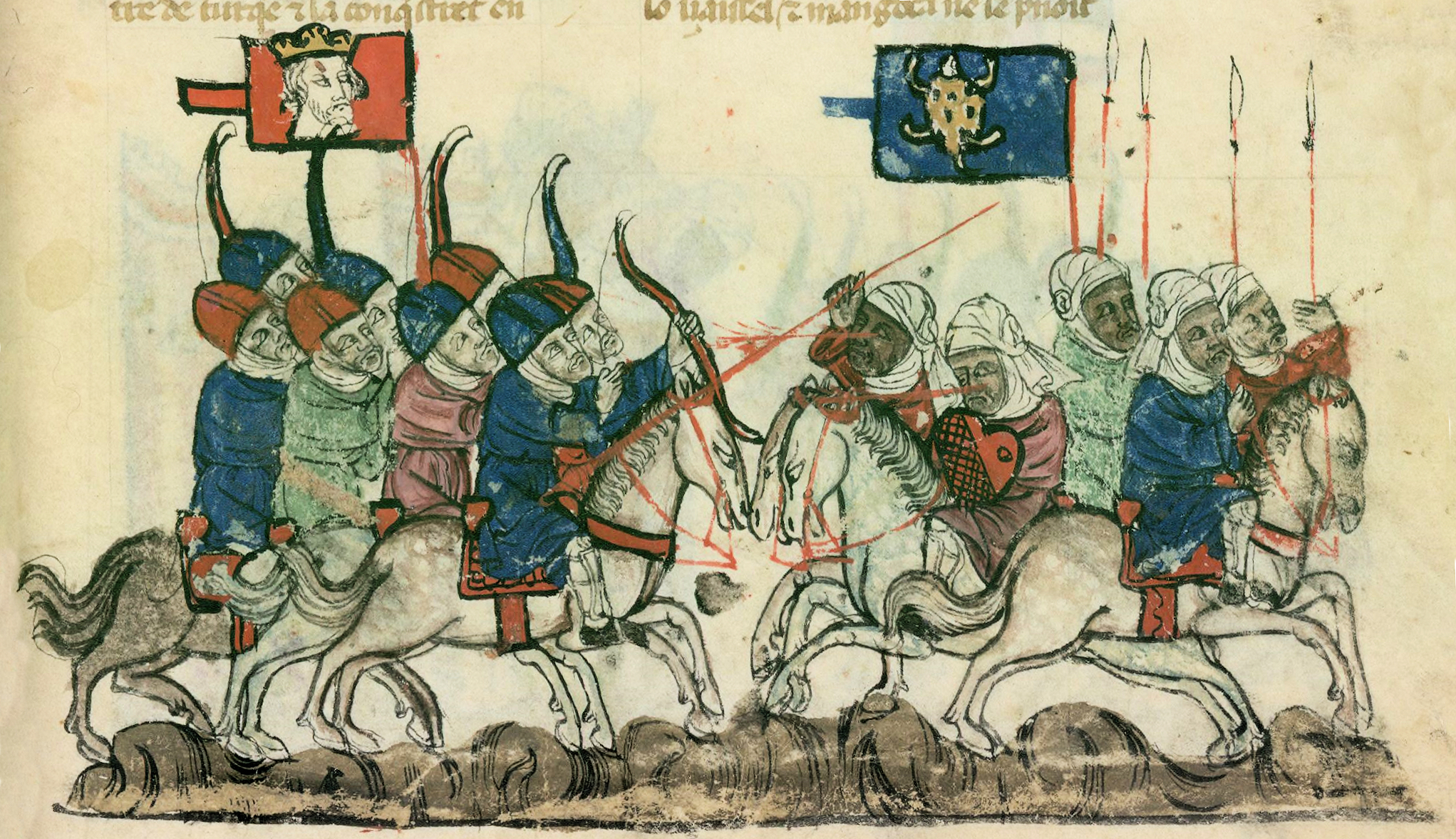
Manuscript depicting the Mongols chasing away the horsemen of Rum at Cosadac. From the Fleur des histoires d'orient, by Hayton of Corycus.

Following the catastrophic Seljuk defeat at the Battle of Köse Dağ by the invading Mongol Empire, and the subsequent deterioration of the state of Rum, the new Sultan Kaykhusraw II reached out to Emperor John III Vatatzes in order to renew the 1230 treaty his father had signed a decade prior. The two rulers met at Tripolis in late 1243 or early 1244, greeted one another in friendly terms, and renewed the treaty, in order to better counter the shared Mongol threat in the east. George Akropolites remarked in his encomium of the emperor:

Yet the Persian, who used to tear up a Roman treaty [when it suited his purposes], is [now] frightened into friendly observance [of such an agreement], and he both returns and "coughs up" the royal monies he earlier extorted from us when he held power. Moreover, he brings his children to you, and, seeing [the resulting] settlements of his own kin [inside your empire], in a novel twist-[despite] being wounded of spirit-he applauds you, the plunderer [of his domains], calling you deliverer and proclaiming you his savior. He even holds out your singularly strong hand as a threat to the arrogant Tartar expedition, relying upon the terror you evoke as his protector.

== Bibliography ==
- George Akropolites: The History. Translated by Macrides, Ruth. Oxford University Press. 2007. ISBN 978-0-19-921067-1.
- Korobeinikov, Dimitri (2014). Byzantium and the Turks in the Thirteenth Century. Oxford: Oxford University Press. ISBN 978-0-19-870826-1.
- Langdon, John S. (1994). Byzantium's Last Imperial Offensive in Asia Minor: The Documentary Evidence for and Hagiographical Lore About John III Ducas Vatatzes' Crusade Against the Turks, 1222 or 1225 to 1231. New York: A.D. Caratzas.
- Shukurov, Rustam (2016). The Byzantine Turks, 1204–1461. BRILL. ISBN 9789004307759.
- Vryonis, Speros (1971). The Decline of Medieval Hellenism in Asia Minor and the Process of Islamization from the Eleventh through the Fifteenth Century. University of California Press. ISBN 0-520-01597-5.
- Wilksman, Juho (2026). Military History of Byzantine Rome, 1204-1261. Pen and Sword. ISBN 978 1 39904 762 3.
