= John Ises =

John Ises (Greek: Ἱωάννης Ἴσης; fl. 1221–36) was a senior military commander of the Empire of Nicaea, with the rank of protostrator.

He is first documented in a chrysobull issued in 1221 by the Nicaean emperor Theodore I Laskaris for the Monastery of Saint John the Theologian on Patmos. He is next mentioned by George Akropolites in ca. 1224, when the inhabitants of Adrianople sent envoys to Nicaea, calling upon the emperor John III Vatatzes to liberate them from Latin rule. Vatatzes sent Ises, along with John Kammytzes, at the head of an army. The city was easily captured, but soon after in late 1224 or early 1225, the ruler of Epirus, Theodore Komnenos Doukas, a rival of Vatatzes who also claimed the imperial title, appeared before the city. Theodore managed to win over the inhabitants, and Ises and Kammytzes agreed to leave the city on guarantee of safe passage. Ises is then mentioned for the last time in another document in 1236.

== Sources ==
- Guilland, Rodolphe (1967). "Le Protostrator". Recherches sur les institutions byzantines [Studies on the Byzantine Institutions]. Berliner byzantinische Arbeiten 35 (in French). Vol. I. Berlin and Amsterdam: Akademie-Verlag & Adolf M. Hakkert. pp. 478–497. OCLC 878894516.
- Macrides, Ruth (2007). George Akropolites: The History – Introduction, Translation and Commentary. Oxford: Oxford University Press. ISBN 978-0-19-921067-1.
