= John Kammytzes =

- Ἱωάννης Καμμύτζης
- Relatives: Manuel Kammytzes (relative)
- Military career
- Allegiance: Empire of Nicaea
- Rank: Megas hetaireiarches
- Commands: Army sent to Adrianople under John III Vatatzes
- Known for: Refusing homage to Theodore Komnenos Doukas
- Conflicts: Campaign for Adrianople (1224–1225)

John Kammytzes (Greek: Ἱωάννης Καμμύτζης; fl. 1224/25) was a senior military commander in the Empire of Nicaea, holding the rank of megas hetaireiarches.

His early life remains unknown. However, he was a member of the prominent aristocratic Kam[m]ytzes clan and related to Manuel Kammytzes, who served as protostrator under the Angelos emperors. He is solely mentioned by George Akropolites in ca. 1224, when the inhabitants of Adrianople sent envoys to Nicaea, calling upon the emperor John III Vatatzes to liberate them from Latin rule. Vatatzes sent Kammytzes, along with the protostrator John Ises, at the head of an army. The city fell quickly, but shortly thereafter, in late 1224 or early 1225, Theodore Komnenos Doukas, the ruler of Epirus and a rival of Vatatzes who also claimed the imperial title, appeared before the city with his forces. Theodore won over the inhabitants, and Ises and Kammytzes agreed to leave the city on guarantee of safe passage. Kammytzes is said to have infuriated Theodore when he failed to dismount and do homage to him as emperor as he was leaving the city, and the Epirote ruler insulted him. As a reward for this display of loyalty, Vatatzes named Kammytzes megas hetaireiarches.

== Sources ==
- Karlin-Hayter, Patricia (1974). "L'hétériarque. L'évolution de son rôle du "De Cerimoniis" au "Traité des Offices"". Jahrbuch der Österreichischen Byzantinistik (in French). 23: 101–143.
- Macrides, Ruth (2007). George Akropolites: The History – Introduction, Translation and Commentary. Oxford: Oxford University Press. ISBN 978-0-19-921067-1.
