= Hellenization in the Byzantine Empire =

Spread of ancient Greek culture, religion, and language in the Eastern Roman Empire

Hellenisation in the Byzantine Empire describes the spread and intensification of ancient Greek culture, religion and language in the Roman Empire and which forms the basis of modern historians calling this later period the Byzantine Empire. The theory of Hellenisation generally applies to the influence of foreign cultures subject to Greek influence or occupation, which includes the ethnic and cultural homogenisation which took place throughout the life of the Byzantine Empire (330-1453).

== Naming ==
Whilst the noun 'Hellene' refers simply to what is ‘Greek’, Hellenisation comes from the word Hellazein. This refers to the adoption of Greek identity, culture and language — “to speak Greek or identify with the Greeks”.

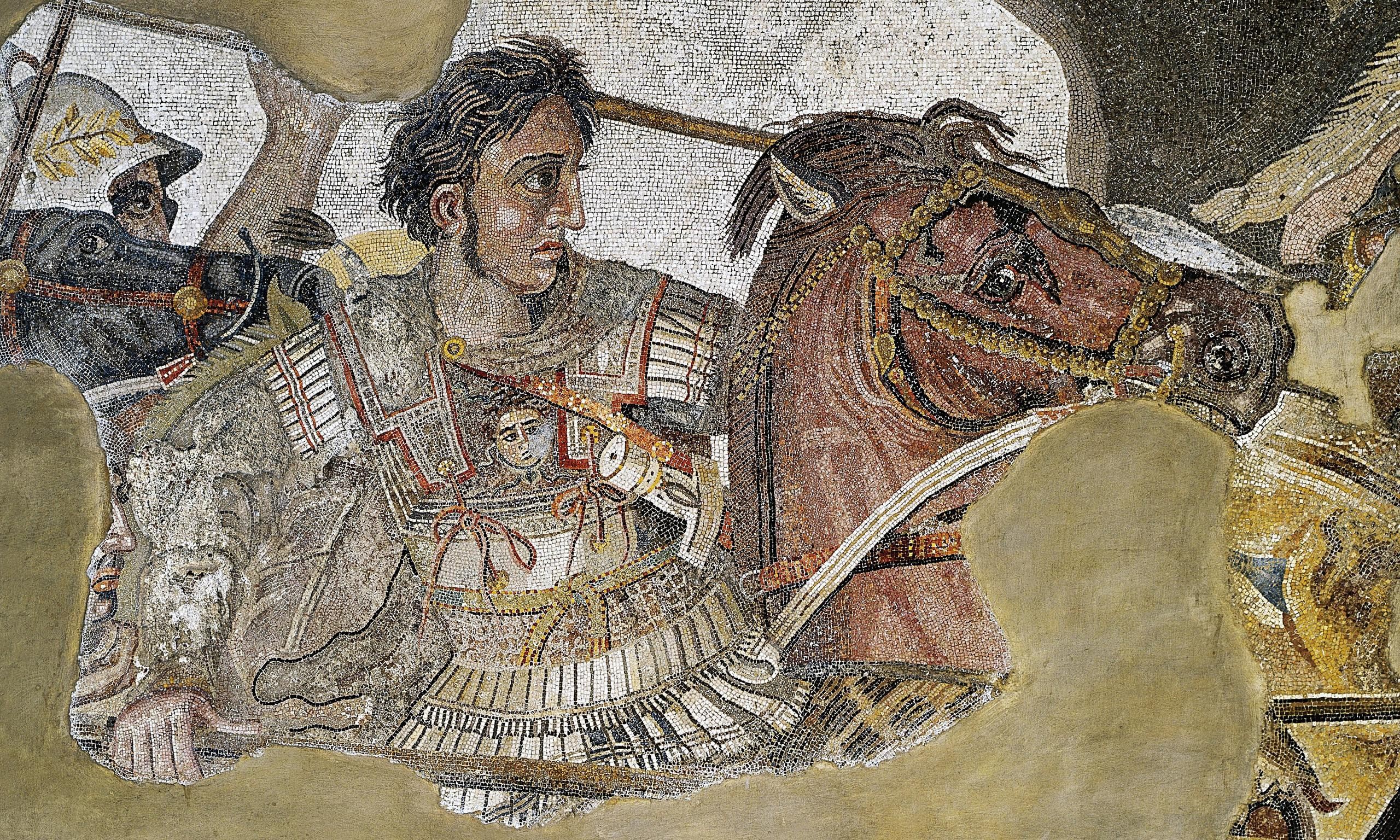
Macedonian King Alexander the Great's various conquests of the Eastern Mediterranean and Southwest Asia were among the first instances of Hellenisation in the ancient world

The Hellenistic period following the campaigns of Alexander the Great in the fourth century is widely associated with the term. However, the wider academic consensus acknowledges its central role in the formulation and transformation of the Byzantine Empire throughout the over one thousand years of its existence.

== Background ==
Following the division of the Empire by the Emperor Diocletian in 286, the Emperor Constantine the Great (324 to 337) conquered rivals to become Emperor of both Eastern and Western halves of the empire. This led to the moving of the Roman capital to the founded city of Constantinople in 330. Making significant changes to the Roman Empire, Constantine legalised Christianity and later converted himself — subsequently leading to a distinct Christian culture. This characterised the Byzantine Empire following the demise of the Western Roman Empire in 476.

Byzantines continued to identify as Roman, and the pronoun ‘Byzantine’ was not used from the beginning. The term is an anachronism which developed in later times derived from the term ‘Byzantium’. This is also the Greek word for Constantinople, the empire’s capital. Despite these Roman Imperial roots, the geographically and largely Hellenic Byzantine Empire witnessed multiple periods of Hellenisation and a departure from its Latin associations from its founding in 330 to its fall in 1453.

Following periods of instability and division between East and West the Roman Senate sent the regalia of the Western Empire to Eastern Emperor Zeno in 476, acknowledging Constantinople as the sole seat of the Roman Empire and Roman Emperor. What followed was a gradually intensifying process of political, cultural and eventually linguistic Hellenisation.

== Change of Imperial Administrative Language from Latin to Greek ==
From the start of the Roman Empire, there was never an official language but Latin and Greek were the main languages. During the principate, knowledge of Greek had been useful to pass the requirements to be an educated noble, and knowledge of Latin was useful for a career in the military, government, or law. Latin had experienced a period of spreading from the second century BCE, and especially in the western provinces, but not as much in the eastern provinces. In the east, Greek was the dominant language, a legacy of the Hellenistic period. Greek was also the language of the Christian Church and trade. Most of the emperors were bilingual but had a preference for Latin in the public sphere for political reasons, a practice that first started during the Punic Wars.

Following Diocletian's reforms in the 3rd century CE, there was a decline in the knowledge of Greek in the West, with Latin reasserted as the language of power in the East. Greek's influence grew, when Arcadius in 397 allowed judges to issue decisions in Greek, Theodosius II in 439 expanded its use in legal procedures, 448 the first law, and the 460s when Leo I legislated in it. Justinian I's Corpus Juris Civilis, a compilation of mostly Roman jurists, was written almost entirely in Latin. However, the laws issued after 534, with Justinian's Novellae Constitutiones, were in Greek and Latin which marks when the government switched officially. Greek for a time became diglossic with the spoken language, known as Koine (later, Demotic Greek), used alongside an older written form (Attic Greek) until Koine won out as the spoken and written standard.

Latin had begun to evolve in the 4th century. It later fragmented into the incipient romance languages in the 8th century CE, following the collapse of the West with the Muslim invasions that broke the connection between speakers.

== Hellenism and Christianity ==
The impact of Christianity following its legitimisation as the official state religion of Rome under Constantine in the 4th century contributed key impacts for the empire and its Hellenistic character. For example, the theological debates in the Christian Church increased the importance of the Greek language, in turn making it highly dependent on Hellenic thought. It enabled philosophy like Neoplatonism to loom large on Christian theology. Anthony Kaldellis views Christianity as "bringing no economic, social, or political changes to the state other than being more deeply integrated into it".

There were varying clashes between the two ideals — Hellenism and Christianity — which were often deemed ‘incompatible’. As Byzantine historian Dvornik notes, the Hellenistic theory of Divine Kingship was reconciled with the Byzantine concept of a single Universal Ruler who “imitated” and personified the Divine Ruler in Heaven. A fusion of Hellenistic doctrines, occurred as to justify this incorporation of Hellenistic and often pagan-associated themes into the heavily Christian society. Such elements included the classical philosophers Plato, Philo and Greek Stoics. Lactanitus and Clement of Alexandria also served as key contributors to the theory, that was solidified and instituted by Byzantine Eusebius of Caesarea in a finalistic and concluding doctrine. This was consistently characterised through the assimilation of neoclassical and Christian themes into Byzantine artwork.

The widespread attempts to reconcile Hellenistic cultural outlets with Christianity were however often questioned and repelled in an outwardly devoutly Christian-dominated culture. The case of Byzantine monk and Hellenistic revivalist Michael Psellos raised serious questions concerning his religious beliefs and the suggestion of their incompatibility with his reverence for Hellenistic cultural egresses. For example, according to Byzantinist Anthony Kaldellis: "In 1054 he [Psellos] was accused by the future Patriarch John Xiphilinos, of forsaking Christ to follow Plato."

== The Byzantine Renaissance ==
The Byzantine Renaissance, also known as the Macedonian Renaissance, marked a philosophic, artistic and literary resurgence of Hellenistic classical culture occurring between the years 867 to 1056. This central cultural aspect of Hellenisation in Byzantium spanned from artistic and architectural styles and mediums appropriated by the Byzantines from Hellenic antiquity, to the poetic, theatrical and historiographical modes of writing and expression associated with ancient Greek literature, idolism and philosophy. This includes the Neoclassical revivals of Psellos and his predilection for Plato and other pagan (often Neoplatonic) philosophers.

=== Cultural resurgence and growing neoclassical tradition ===
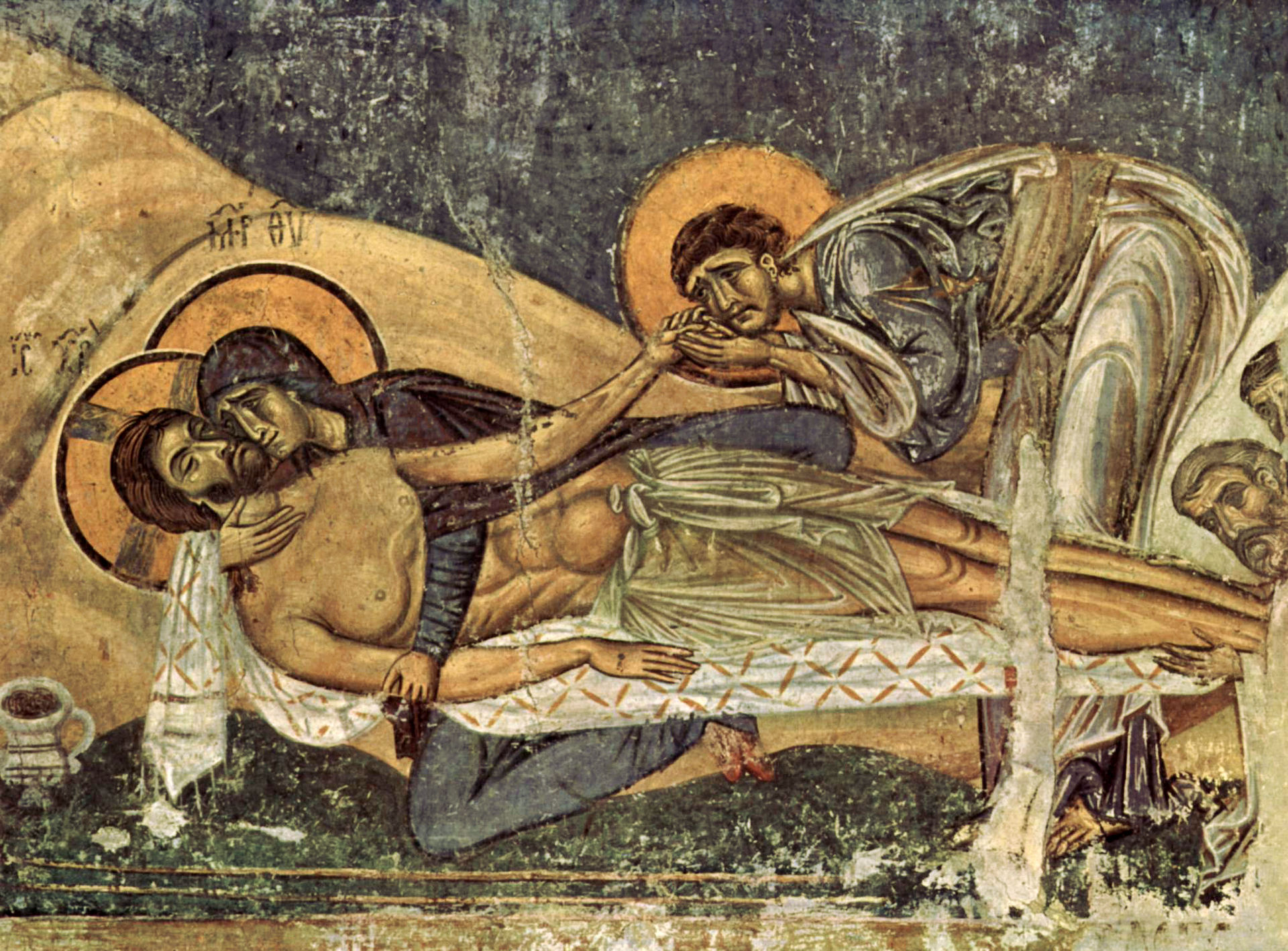
Frescoe located in Nerezi near Skopje (1164), with a unique blend of high humanity, Greek Tragedy, humanity, Christianity and Realism.

Before the reforms in the 7th century, Latin was the imperial language of government, administration and law whilst Ancient Greek served as the language of its literature and culture. Shortly following the anti-Hellenic and conservative Christian Iconoclasm of the previous dynasty, the ascent of Basil I marked the start of the Macedonian Dynasty in 867 and a rise of Neoclassical Byzantine Greek revival. Due to the rise of Imperial Byzantine power and successful military campaigns against Arab forces, a bolstering of the Empire's treasuries and an economic boom led to greater cultural and artistic preoccupation and neoclassical sentiment.

=== In Historiography and Literature ===
The resurgence of cultural Greek-identifying in the Byzantine Empire during the Byzantine Renaissance and its unprecedented enamour with classical Greece (until the later Italian and Northern Renaissance’s) is made clear by the 15th century Byzantine scholar Apostolis:

". . . Did you understand therefore how great a difference there is between the Greek and the European [\'Vestern] fathers in theology and in the other branches of philosophy? Who can be compared with Orpheus, Homer, and Stesichorus in poetry; who with Plotinus, Proclus, and Porphyry; with Arius, Origen, and Eusebius, men [i.e., heretics] who have split the seam of Christ's garment? Who can be compared with Cyril, Gregory, and Basil; who, in the field of grammar, can equal or approach Herodian, Apollonius, and Trypho…do you not understand that Athens alone of all Greece was able to give birth to more philosophers than all Italy had or has? Now, however, I admit, we are the remnants of the Greeks, a view with which you of course agree willingly."

==== The Alexiad: Anna Komnene ====
This Hellenising veneration of Classical Greek culture is clearly seen in Byzantine literature. This particularly includes the historical works of princess, physician and historian Anna Komnene of the Komnenos Dynasty of the 12th century. In her esteemed historical work recounting the Crusades of the 12th century which threatened Byzantium's lands in the East, The Alexiad utilises clear classical Greek styles of epic poetry and rhetoric, associated with Homer and a historiographical "empirical spirit" of historians such as Thucydides, striving to derive historical accounts from first hand experience. Modern scholarship has drawn causal links to Greek mythology's influences in her work. As historian Lenora Neville notes:

"...in its title, Alexiad, and frequent Homeric vocabulary and imagery, it brings the archaic epics to mind. The characterization of Alexios as a wily sea captain steering the empire through constant storms with guile and courage strongly recalls Odysseus. Both in its epic cast and in other factors discussed below...the Alexiad is hence an unusual work that defies the expectations of readers who anticipate another volume in the tradition of classicizing Greek prose historiography."

Originally written in Greek in the 12th century (1148) and initially edited in 1651, the Alexiad depicts the events of the Crusades against the grain of common forms of historiography during the period. Written from a first hand, personable perspective and voice, the Alexiad dramatically acknowledges feelings and opinions of the events in a style emblematic of Homer's Iliad and other classical Greek styles of expression.

== Notes ==
=== Secondary sources ===
- Bryce, James (1901). Studies in History and Jurisprudence, Vol. 1. New York: Oxford University Press. ISBN 978-1-4021-9046-9.
- Jones, A. H. M. (1986). The Later Roman Empire 284–602. Vol. II. Oxford: Basil Blackwell.
- Kaldellis, Anthony (2023). The New Roman Empire: A History of Byzantium. New York: Oxford University Press. doi:10.1093/oso/9780197549322.001.0001. ISBN 978-0197549322.
- McDonnell, Myles Anthony (2006). Roman Manliness: Virtus and the Roman Republic. Cambridge: Cambridge University Press. ISBN 978-0-521-82788-1.
- Millar, Fergus (2006). A Greek Roman Empire: Power and Belief under Theodosius II (408–450). Berkeley and Los Angeles: University of California Press. ISBN 978-0-520-24703-1.
- Oikonomides, Nikos (1999). "L᾽"Unilinguisme" Officiel de Constantinople Byzantine". Byzantina Symmeikta (in French). 13: 9–22. doi:10.12681/byzsym.857. ISSN 1105-1639.
- Rochette, Bruno (2011). "Language Policies in the Roman Republic and Empire". A Companion to the Latin Language. pp. 549–563. doi:10.1002/9781444343397.ch30. hdl:2268/35932. ISBN 9781405186056. Archived from the original on 9 February 2024.
- Rochette, Bruno (2018). "Was there a Roman linguistic imperialism during the Republic and the early Principate?". Lingue e Linguaggio (1/2018): 107–128. doi:10.1418/90426. ISSN 1720-9331. Archived from the original on 4 October 2023.
- Rochette, Bruno (2023). Mullen, Alex (ed.). "The Attitude of the Roman Emperors towards Language Practices". Social Factors in the Latinization of the Roman West (1 ed.). Oxford: Oxford Academic. doi:10.1093/oso/9780198887294.003.001 (inactive 12 July 2025). ISBN 978-0-19-888729-4. Archived from the original on 22 December 2023.
- Sedlar, Jean W. (1994). East Central Europe in the Middle Ages, 1000–1500. Vol. III. Seattle: University of Washington Press. ISBN 978-0-295-97290-9.
- Treadgold, Warren (1997). A History of the Byzantine State and Society. Stanford, California: Stanford University Press. ISBN 0-8047-2630-2.
- Wallace-Hadrill, A. (1998). "To Be Roman, Go Greek Thoughts on Hellenization at Rome". Bulletin of the Institute of Classical Studies. Supplement (71): 79–91. ISSN 2398-3264. JSTOR 43767621. Archived from the original on 28 December 2023.
