= Plutonium (disambiguation) =

Plutonium is a radioactive chemical element with symbol Pu and atomic number 94.

Plutonium may also refer to:

- a ploutonion (Latin: plutonium), any of several places where the Greco-Roman god Pluto was worshipped, particularly
  - Pluto's Gate, the plutonium near the hot springs at Pamukkale in Turkey (ancient Phrygian Hierapolis)
- Plutonium, a genus of centipedes
- Plutonium, a fictional drug depicted in Clark Ashton Smith's "The Plutonium Drug"
- Plutonium Nyborg, a fictional drug in the film Heavy Metal

== See also ==
- Pu (disambiguation)
- Pluto (disambiguation)
- Isotopes of plutonium
