= Honaz =

- District and municipality
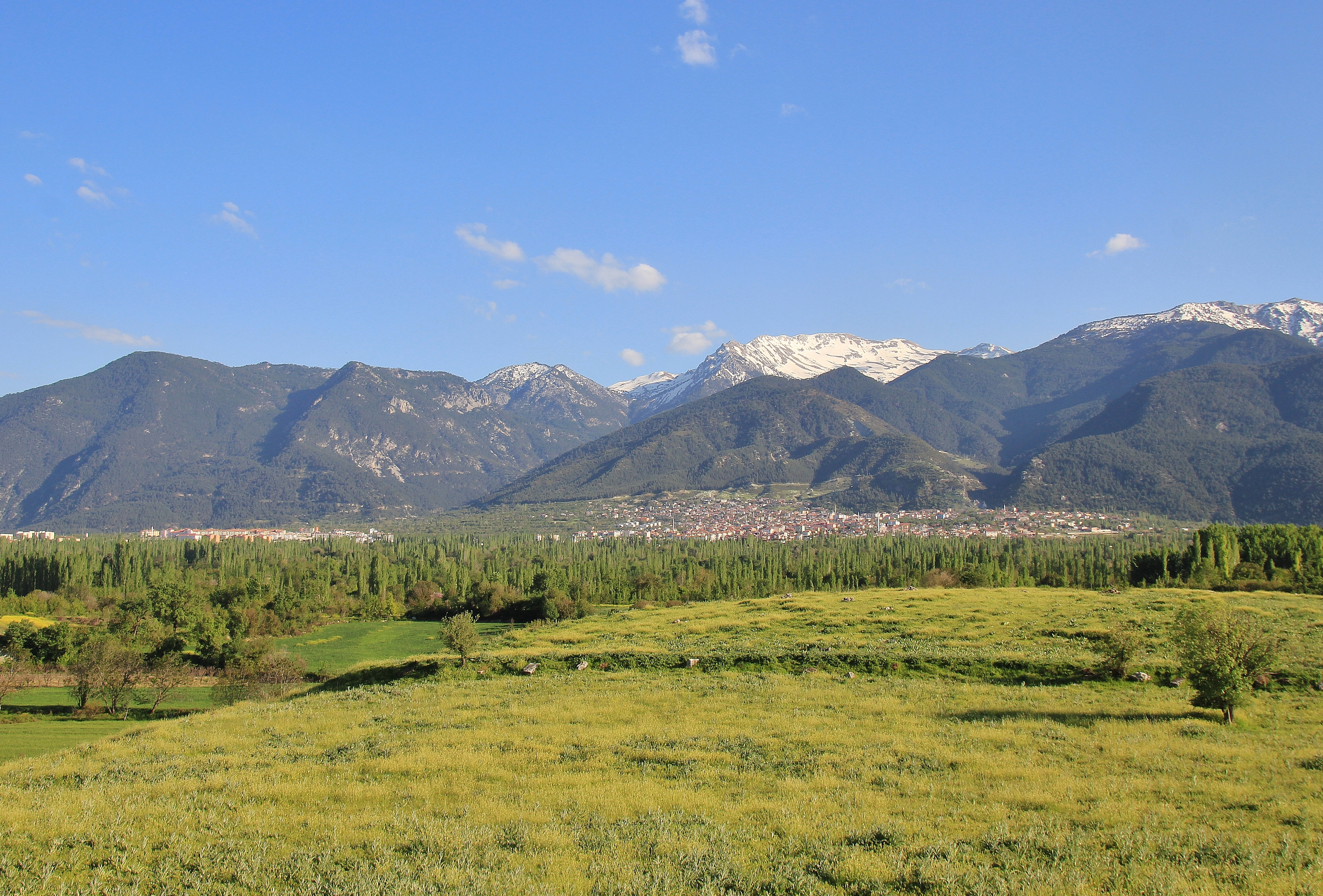

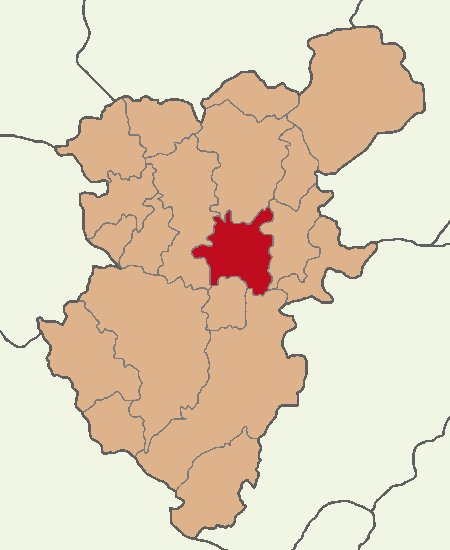
- Map showing Honaz District in Denizli Province

- Location within Turkey Location within Turkey Aegean
- Coordinates: 37°45′28″N 29°15′51″E
- Country: Turkey
- Province: Denizli

Government
  - Mayor: Yüksel Kepenek (CHP)
- Area: 449 km^{2} (173 sq mi)
- Population (2022): 34,074
  - Density: 75.9/km^{2} (197/sq mi)
- Time zone: UTC+3 (TRT)
- Postal code: 20330
- Area code: 0258
- Website: www.honaz.bel.tr

Honaz (also known as Khonaz or Cadmus) is a municipality and district of Denizli Province, Turkey. Its area is 449 km^{2}, and its population is 34,074 (2022).

Honaz is about 20 km (12 mi) east of the city of Denizli on the slopes of the mountain of the same name – Mount Honaz (Honaz Dağı). The mountain is the highest peak in Turkey's Aegean Region (2517 m). Just north of Honaz is Honaz Stream (Honaz Çayı), known in ancient times as the Lycus.

== History ==
=== Classical Age ===
In antiquity it was known as Colossae. At 500 BC Colossae was founded by the Phrygians, and then passed into the hands of the Ancient Greeks. Herodotus and Xenophon both record the passage of Greek and Persian armies though here during the Persian Wars, at that time it was a large Phrygian city. A few ruins of the ancient city remain. Like many other ancient cities of the region, Colossae was destroyed by earthquakes, with little surviving.

==== Byzantine period ====
In the Byzantine period its name was Chonae. The city was distinguished in 858 as a Metropolitan See and possibly served as the capital of the Thracesian Theme from the 7th to the 11th century. The Byzantines also built the Church of Archangel Michael, one of the most important churches in Anatolia. The settlement decreased in importance because of Arab raids but it soon recovered and became a vital economic and religious center.

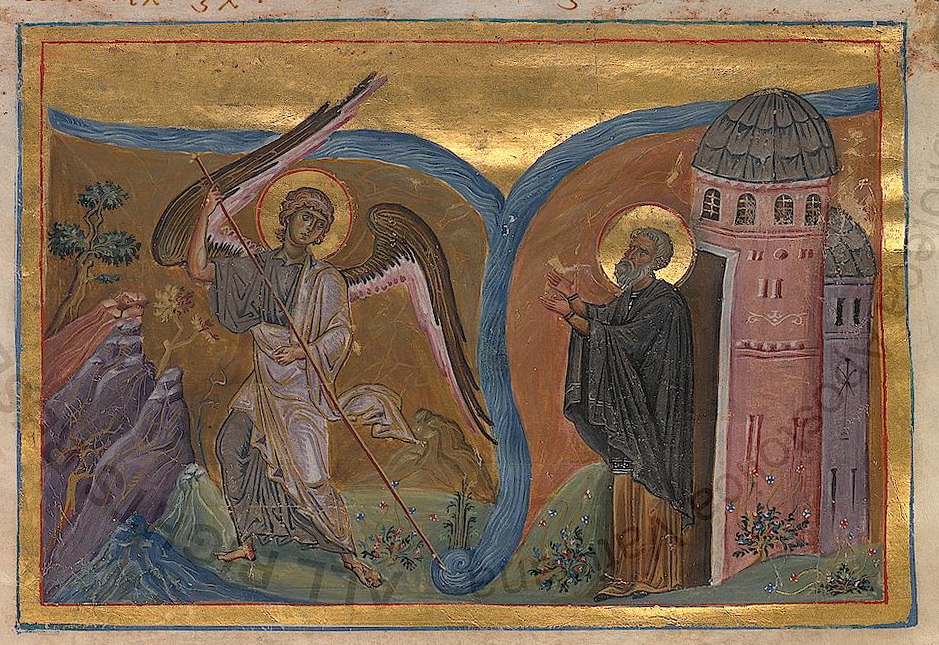
Miracle of the Archangel Michael at Colossae (Menologion of Basil II, c. 1000 AD)

In 1070 Chonae was sacked by the Seljuk Afshin, who plundered the Church of Archangel Michael and turned it into a horse stable. The residents of the city attempted to escape in a nearby cave close to a river, but the water level rose and flooded the cave, drowning all the survivors there. Chonae was retaken during the Komnenian period And during the reign of Manuel I Komnenos it prospered as a frontier town, a trading and pilgrimage venue for both Christians and Muslims. The forces of Louis VII of France, en route to the Holy Land as part of the Second Crusade, were attacked here by the Turks in the battle of Mount Cadmus of 1148. The Byzantine chronicler Niketas Choniates and his brother Saint Michael Choniates were natives of the town.

Chonae was plundered twice by local warlords backed by the Turks, by Theodoros Mankaphas in the late 1180s and by Pseudo-Alexios in 1192, in which the Turks destroyed the mosaics, the altar, and then the rest of the Church of Archangel Michael. The settlement finally fell to the Seljuks soon afterwards. Kaykhusraw I promised to return it to the Byzantines, but in view of the collapse of imperial power caused by the Fourth Crusade and the Latin conquest of Constantinople, he decided to assign it to his father-in-law, the Byzantine renegade Manuel Maurozomes. The latter held it as an autonomous lordship together with Laodikeia, near present-day Denizli, from 1205 until his death around 1230. Theodore I Laskaris came to accept the event in a 1206 agreement with Kaykhusraw I. In 1257 Chonae (along with Laodikeia and the two fortresses of Sakaina and Ypsele) were given to the Empire of Nicaea by Sultan Kaykaus II in exchange for military support in regaining Iconium, but only a few years later the city was lost to Turkomans.

There is a Seljuk fortress in Honaz, and the Murat Mosque which dates back to the reign of Ottoman Sultan Murat II (imperabat 1404–1451).

=== Modern period ===
In the 20th century, Honaz was one of the places where the Vallahades or Valaades (ethnic Greek Muslims from southwest Greek Macedonia) were forced to resettle during the Population exchange between Greece and Turkey of 1922–23.

== Composition ==
There are 22 neighbourhoods in Honaz District:

- Afşinbey
- Akbaş
- Aşağıdağdere
- Aydınlar
- Cumhuriyet
- Dereçiftlik
- Emirazizli
- Gürleyik
- Haydar
- Hisar
- Hürriyet
- Kaklık
- Karaçay
- Karateke
- Kızılyer
- Kocabaş
- Menteşe
- Ovacık
- Sapaca
- Yeni
- Yokuşbaşı
- Yukarıdağdere

== Honaz today ==
Today the economy of Honaz is centred on growing cherries, 80% of the crop being exported from Turkey, generating up to 35 million dollars of income per annum. There is an annual cherry festival in the town. Tomatoes and other fruits and vegetables are grown too including a local variety of oleaster.

Honaz is also the homeland of a number of well-known pehlivans (oil wrestlers) including the 3-time national champion Hüseyin Çokal.

In the nearby depending township of Kaklık, there is a large cave called "Kaklık Cave" or "Kaklık Mağarası" which attracts visitors from all over the country. A spring that spurts out on the surface only to flow back underground shortly afterwards through the cave in cascading layers of limestone and travertine caused Kaklık to appear very much like a subterranean Pamukkale.

== Sources ==
- Klaus Belke, Norbert Mersich, Phrygien und Pisidien, Tabula Imperii Byzantini VII, Wien 1990, s. 309–311.
- O City of Byzantium, Annals of Niketas Choniates, ed. Harry J. Magoulias, Detroit, MI 1984.
- Claude Cahen, The Formation of Turkey. The Seljukid Sultanate of Rum: Eleventh to Fourteenth Century, Harlow 2001.
