= Sapaca =

Sapaca can refer to:

- Sapaca, Honaz
- Sapaca, Kastamonu
