= Akbaş, Honaz =

Village in Turkey

Akbaş
- Neighbourhood
- Location in Turkey Akbaş (Turkey Aegean)
- Coordinates: 37.7459°N 29.4169°E
- Country: Turkey
- Province: Denizli
- District: Honaz
- Population (2022): 676
- Time zone: UTC+3 (TRT)

Akbaş is a neighbourhood in the municipality and district of Honaz, Denizli Province in Turkey. Its population is 676 (2022).
