= Menteşe, Honaz =

Village in Turkey

Menteşe
- Neighbourhood
- Country: Turkey
- Province: Denizli
- District: Honaz
- Population (2022): 353
- Time zone: UTC+3 (TRT)

Menteşe is a neighbourhood in the municipality and district of Honaz, Denizli Province in Turkey. Its population is 353 (2022).
