= Ovacık, Honaz =

Village in Turkey

Ovacık
- Neighbourhood
- Country: Turkey
- Province: Denizli
- District: Honaz
- Population (2022): 379
- Time zone: UTC+3 (TRT)

Ovacık is a neighbourhood in the municipality and district of Honaz, Denizli Province in Turkey. Its population is 379 (2022).
