= Kocabaş =

- Neighbourhood
- Location in Turkey Kocabaş (Turkey Aegean)
- Coordinates: 37°49′N 29°19′E
- Country: Turkey
- Province: Denizli
- District: Honaz
- Elevation: 445 m (1,460 ft)
- Population (2022): 934
- Time zone: UTC+3 (TRT)
- Postal code: 20330
- Area code: 0258

Kocabaş is a neighbourhood of the municipality and district of Honaz, Denizli Province, Turkey. Its population is 934 (2022). Before the 2013 reorganisation, it was a town (belde).

It is situated in the plains of Büyük Menderes River (historical Maeander). The distance to Honaz is 12 kilometres (7.5 mi) and to Denizli is 26 kilometres (16 mi). Although the fertile area round Kocabaş was always populated in the historical ages, the town in the open plains is a relatively recent settlement probably because of the security reasons.
