= Aydınlar, Honaz =

Village in Turkey

Aydınlar
- Neighbourhood
- Location in Turkey Aydınlar (Turkey Aegean)
- Coordinates: 37.7391°N 29.3588°E
- Country: Turkey
- Province: Denizli
- District: Honaz
- Population (2022): 454
- Time zone: UTC+3 (TRT)

Aydınlar is a neighbourhood in the municipality and district of Honaz, Denizli Province in Turkey. Its population is 454 (2022).
