= Karaçay, Honaz =

Village in Turkey

Karaçay
- Neighbourhood
- Location in Turkey Karaçay (Turkey Aegean)
- Coordinates: 37°41′10″N 29°25′5″E
- Country: Turkey
- Province: Denizli
- District: Honaz
- Population (2022): 934
- Time zone: UTC+3 (TRT)

Karaçay is a neighbourhood of the municipality and district of Honaz, Denizli Province, Turkey. Its population is 934 (2022). Before the 2013 reorganisation, it was a town (belde).
