= Kaklık =

- Neighbourhood
- Location in Turkey Kaklık (Turkey Aegean)
- Coordinates: 37°49′48″N 29°24′54″E
- Country: Turkey
- Province: Denizli
- District: Honaz
- Elevation: 500 m (1,600 ft)
- Population (2022): 4,909
- Time zone: UTC+3 (TRT)
- Postal code: 20240
- Area code: 0258

Kaklık is a neighbourhood of the municipality and district of Honaz, Denizli Province, Turkey. Its population is 4,909 (2022). Before the 2013 reorganisation, it was a town (belde).

== Geography ==
Kaklık is situated in the plain which is named Kaklık plain. It is on both the state highway D.320 and the railroad. The distance to Honaz is 11 km (6.8 mi) and to Denizli is 35 km (22 mi).

== History ==
Kaklık is an old (14th century ?) settlement. The name of the settlement probably refers to partridges (Turkish: keklik) which are abundant around. In the 11th century, the settlement was a part of Seljuks of Turkey. After it was captured by the Crusades, it was returned to Seljuks in 1206. In 1423 it was incorporated into Ottoman Empire. After the First World War, during the partition of Turkey the settlement was offered to Italia, but it was occupied by Greek forces. After the Turkish War of Independence, the town was returned to Turkey. Following the construction of the highway in 1936, Kaklık flourished and in 1971 it was declared a seat of township.

== Economy ==
Situated in the fertile plain, the town's economy depends on agriculture. Cereal, cotton, sugar beet and anise are among the more important crops. Travertine mining is another profitable activity. Kaklık Cave, to the north of the town is a touristic cave.
