= Kızılyer, Honaz =

Village in Turkey

Kızılyer
- Neighbourhood
- Location within Turkey Location within Turkey Aegean
- Coordinates: 37°47′N 29°20′E
- Country: Turkey
- Province: Denizli
- District: Honaz
- Population (2022): 1,094
- Time zone: UTC+3 (TRT)

Kızılyer is a neighbourhood of the municipality and district of Honaz, Denizli Province, Turkey. Its population is 1,094 (2022). Before the 2013 reorganisation, it was a town (belde).
