= Yukarıdağdere, Honaz =

Village in Turkey

Yukarıdağdere
- Neighbourhood
- Location in Turkey Yukarıdağdere (Turkey Aegean)
- Coordinates: 37°47′N 29°24′E
- Country: Turkey
- Province: Denizli
- District: Honaz
- Population (2022): 173
- Time zone: UTC+3 (TRT)

Yukarıdağdere is a neighbourhood in the municipality and district of Honaz, Denizli Province in Turkey. Its population is 173 (2022).
