= Afşinbey, Honaz =

Village in Turkey

Afşinbey
- Neighbourhood
- Location in Turkey Afşinbey (Turkey Aegean)
- Coordinates: 37°45′47″N 29°16′44″E
- Country: Turkey
- Province: Denizli
- District: Honaz
- Population (2024): 2,872
- Time zone: UTC+3 (TRT)

Afşinbey is a neighbourhood in the municipality and district of Honaz, Denizli Province in Turkey. Its population is 2,872 (2024).
