= Gürleyik, Honaz =

Village in Turkey

Gürleyik
- Neighbourhood
- Location in Turkey Gürleyik (Turkey Aegean)
- Coordinates: 37°48′54″N 29°15′43″E
- Country: Turkey
- Province: Denizli
- District: Honaz
- Population (2022): 1,345
- Time zone: UTC+3 (TRT)

Gürleyik is a neighbourhood in the municipality and district of Honaz, Denizli Province in Turkey. Its population is 1,345 (2022).
