= Aşağıdağdere, Honaz =

Village in Turkey

Aşağıdağdere
- Neighbourhood
- Location in Turkey Aşağıdağdere (Turkey Aegean)
- Coordinates: 37°49′N 29°24′E
- Country: Turkey
- Province: Denizli
- District: Honaz
- Population (2022): 596
- Time zone: UTC+3 (TRT)

Aşağıdağdere is a neighbourhood in the municipality and district of Honaz, Denizli Province in Turkey. Its population is 596 (2022).
