= Karateke, Honaz =

Village in Turkey

Karateke
- Neighbourhood
- Location in Turkey Karateke (Turkey Aegean)
- Coordinates: 37°45′25″N 29°13′08″E
- Country: Turkey
- Province: Denizli
- District: Honaz
- Population (2022): 1,208
- Time zone: UTC+3 (TRT)

Karateke is a neighbourhood in the municipality and district of Honaz, Denizli Province in Turkey. Its population is 1,208 (2022).
