= Emirazizli, Honaz =

Village in Turkey

Emirazizli
- Neighbourhood
- Location in Turkey Emirazizli (Turkey Aegean)
- Coordinates: 37°46′N 29°14′E
- Country: Turkey
- Province: Denizli
- District: Honaz
- Population (2022): 378
- Time zone: UTC+3 (TRT)

Emirazizli is a neighbourhood, in the municipality and district of Honaz, the Denizli Province in Turkey. Its population is 378 (2022).
