= Kaklık Cave =

Turkish visitor attraction in Denizli Province

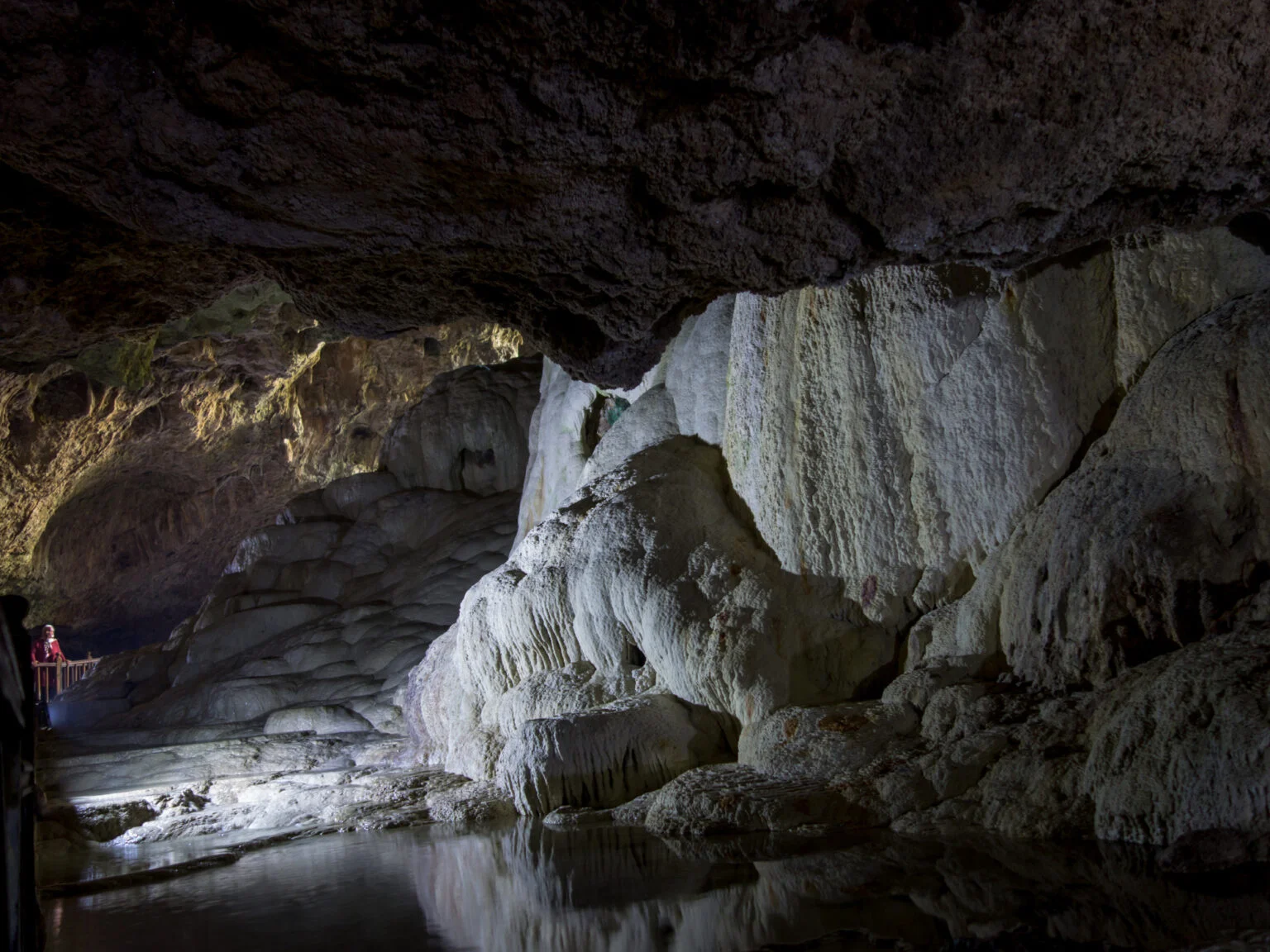
Kaklik Cave travertines

Kaklık Cave is a touristic cave in Turkey.

== Location ==
The cave is in Kaklık town of Denizli Province at 37°52′24″N 29°23′7″E Its distance to Denizli is about 30 kilometres (19 mi). Visitors to the cave follow the highway to east and in Kaklık town they turn to north. The cave was opened to visits in 2002. There are a small amphitheatre, a swimming pool and a cafeteria in and around the cave.

== The cave ==
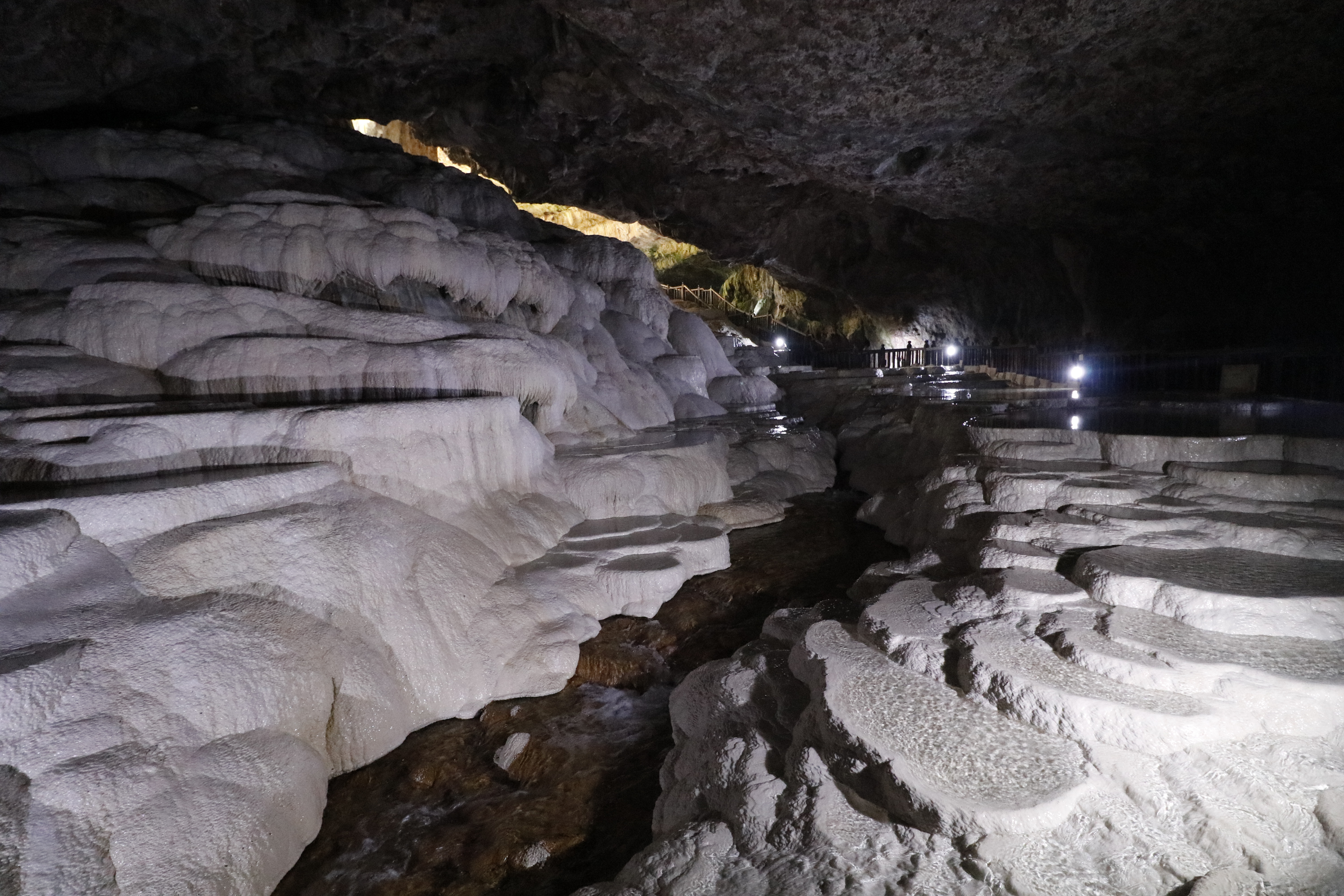
Kaklık Cave

The cave is full of dripstones, stalactites and stalagmites. There are also travertine formations and a small thermal lake at the bottom of the cave. The cave was formed by rift ponor. It is popularly called small Pamukkale referring to Pamukkale, a well known touristic place to the west of the cave.

== Hyrochemical characteristics of the lake ==
According to the governor of Denizli Province the Hyrochemical characterisrtics of the lake water is as follows

Acidity (Ph):6.85
Water hardness:116.9
Amonium:None
Chlorine (active): None
Calcium: 286.17 mgr/lt
Magnesium:110.62 mgr/lt
