= Ploutonion =

Sanctuary specially dedicated to the ancient Greek god Plouton

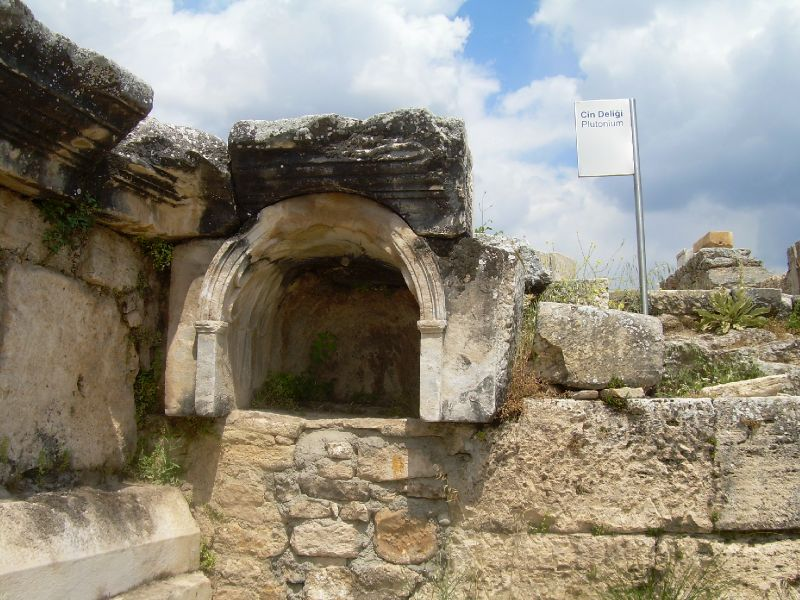
Pluto's Gate ("Old Plutonion" adjacent to the Temple of Apollo) at Hierapolis

A ploutonion (Ancient Greek: Πλουτώνιον, lit. "Place of Plouton") is a sanctuary specially dedicated to the ancient Greek god Plouton (i.e. Hades). Only a few such shrines are known from classical sources, usually at locations that produce poisonous emissions and were considered to represent an entrance to the underworld.

Archeologists study these sites to better understand history. In studying these sites more is also learnt about ancient sources that speak of them.

These sites provide additional information about mythological history from looking at the inscriptions. There is also mythological history through the ancient sources that speak of ploutonions.

== Instances ==
Map of modern day Greece (blue) and Turkey (red) that depicts the ancient ploutonion sites.

At Eleusis, the ploutonion was near the north entrance to the sacred district (temenos). It was built by Peisistratos in the 6th century BC and rebuilt two centuries later, when the Eleusinian Mysteries were at the height of their influence. The cave was the traditional site of the birth of the Divine Child Ploutos.

The Greek geographer Strabo mentioned three sites as having a ploutonion. One was on a hill between Tralleis and Nysa. This ploutonion was located in a village called Acharaca. Its precinct encompassed a sacred grove, a temple dedicated to Plouton and Persephone, and an adjoining cave called the Charonion, after the ferryman of the dead. According to Strabo, it "possesses some singular physical properties" and served as a shrine for healing and a dream oracle (incubation). This cave healed people who were left there over many days with no food. This cave is deadly and off limits for everyone who is not sick or a person who has the healing powers of the gods.

Pluto's Gate, the ploutonion at Phrygian Hierapolis (modern Pamukkale in Turkey), was connected to the local cult of Cybele. Inhaling its vapours was said to be lethal to all living things except the Galli, the goddess's eunuch priests. During the Roman Imperial era, the cult of Apollo subsumed existing religious sites there, including the ploutonion. Archaeological excavations in the 1960s showed that the ploutonion had been located within the sacred precinct of Apollo: "it consisted of a natural opening along a wall of travertine, leading to a grotto in which streams of hot water gushed forth to release a noxious exhalation". This site was also associated with a dream oracle; the Neoplatonist Damascius dreamed that he was Attis in the company of the Great Mother.

Strabo further records that Lake Avernus in Italy had been taken as a ploutonion because the gases it produced were so noxious that they overwhelmed birds flying overhead. According to earlier sources, he says, this was the oracle of the dead (nekumanteion) sought by Odysseus in Book 11 of the Odyssey; Strabo, however, seems not to have himself regarded Avernus as a ploutonion.

== Archeology ==
At the site of Hierapolis the ploutonion (Pluto's Gate) was built above a cave during the early Imperial period. Hot waters and poison gas come out of this cave. There was a lot of information learnt at this site about the building structures and how the environment impacted the material over time. The excavations done at this site have uncovered the entire ploutonion, the sanctuary of Pluto. A grotto and theatre were found that are repersented in primary sources from antiquity. The arched opening on the ploutonion had an entrance to the sacred cave for worship practices, and the theatre was used for sacred rituals. Strabo talks about this ploutonion in depth which touches on both the archeological aspects of the sanctuary but also the mythological. This site has the most archealogical work doccumented for it out of the ploutonion sites.

== Mythology ==
The ploutonion site at Hierapolis (Pluto's Gate) has carvings with dedications to both the god Pluto and the goddess Kore. This site was thought as an entrance to the underworld and is the place where Hades brought Kore into his domain in the abduction myth.

The Hierapolis ploutonion (Pluto's Gate) and the ploutonion at Acharaca have shrines to both Pluto and Kore/Persephone. While the ploutonions are a place of worship to Pluto they often worship his wife as well.

The ploutonion at Acharaca focused on Kore and Pluto's marriage. The followers would worship their unity and this worship links to the abduction of Persephone myth. The location of this ploutonion lines up with the Homeric description of where part of the abduction of Persephone took place.

== See also ==
- Avernus
- Gates of Hell
- Pluto's Gate (the ploutonion at Hierapolis)
- Thermopylae
- Necromanteion of Acheron
- Yomotsu Hirasaka
