= Pamukkale =

Natural site in Denizli Province in southwestern Turkey

UNESCO World Heritage Site
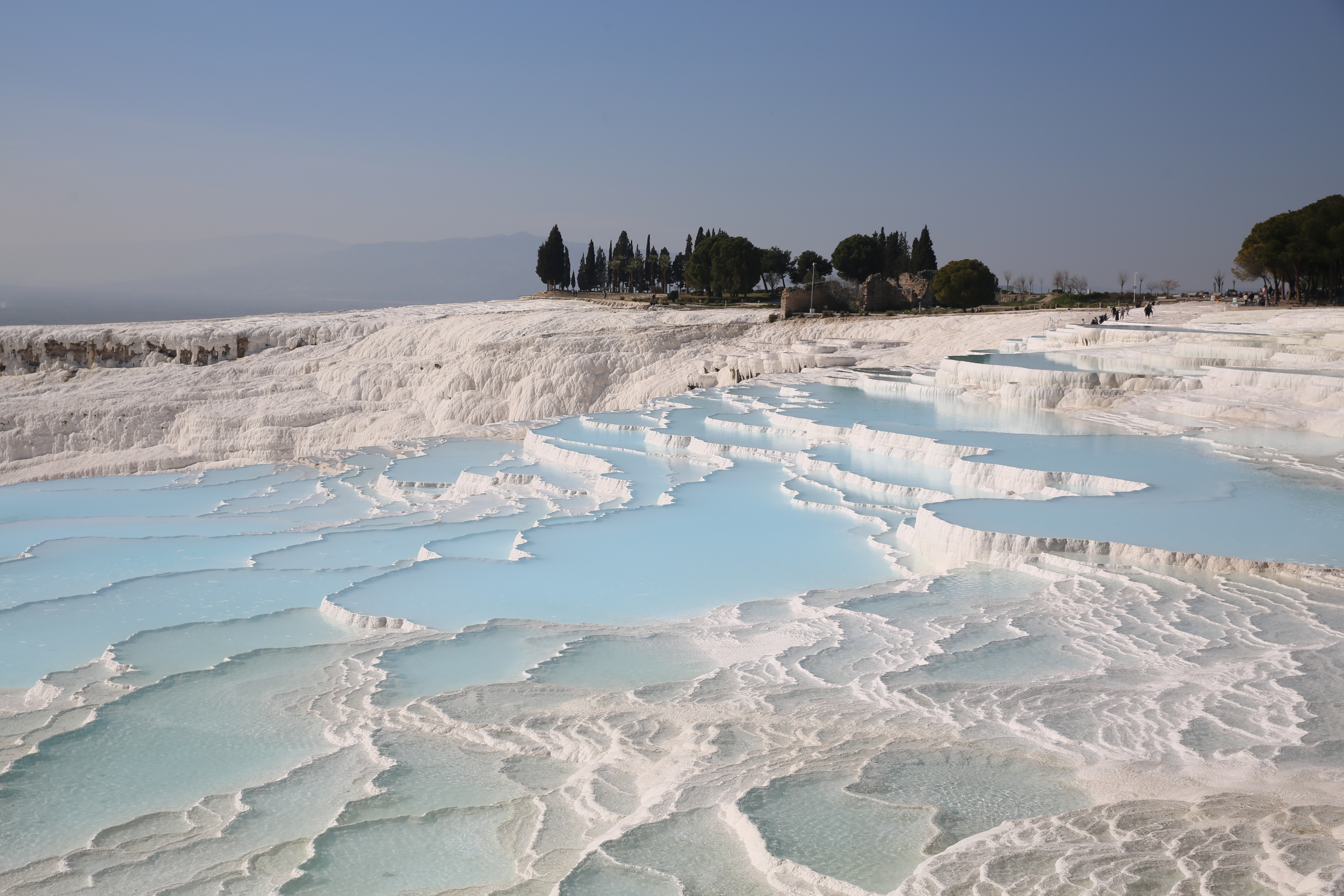
- Panoramic view of travertine at Pamukkale

- Location within Turkey
- Official name: Hierapolis-Pamukkale
- Location: Denizli Province, Turkey
- Criteria: Cultural and Natural: (iii)(iv)(vii)
- Reference: 485
- Inscription: 1988 (12th Session)
- Area: 1,077 ha (4.16 sq mi)
- Website: www.pamukkale.gov.tr/en
- Coordinates: 37°55′26″N 29°07′24″E

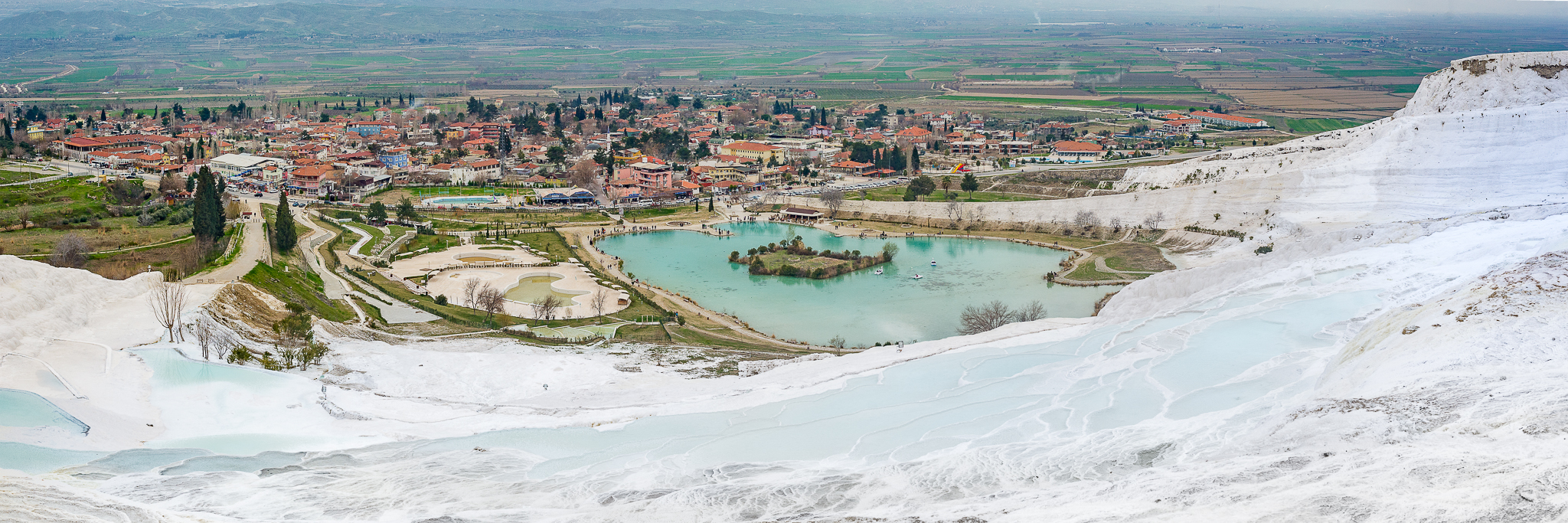
Panoramic view of travertine terraces at Pamukkale

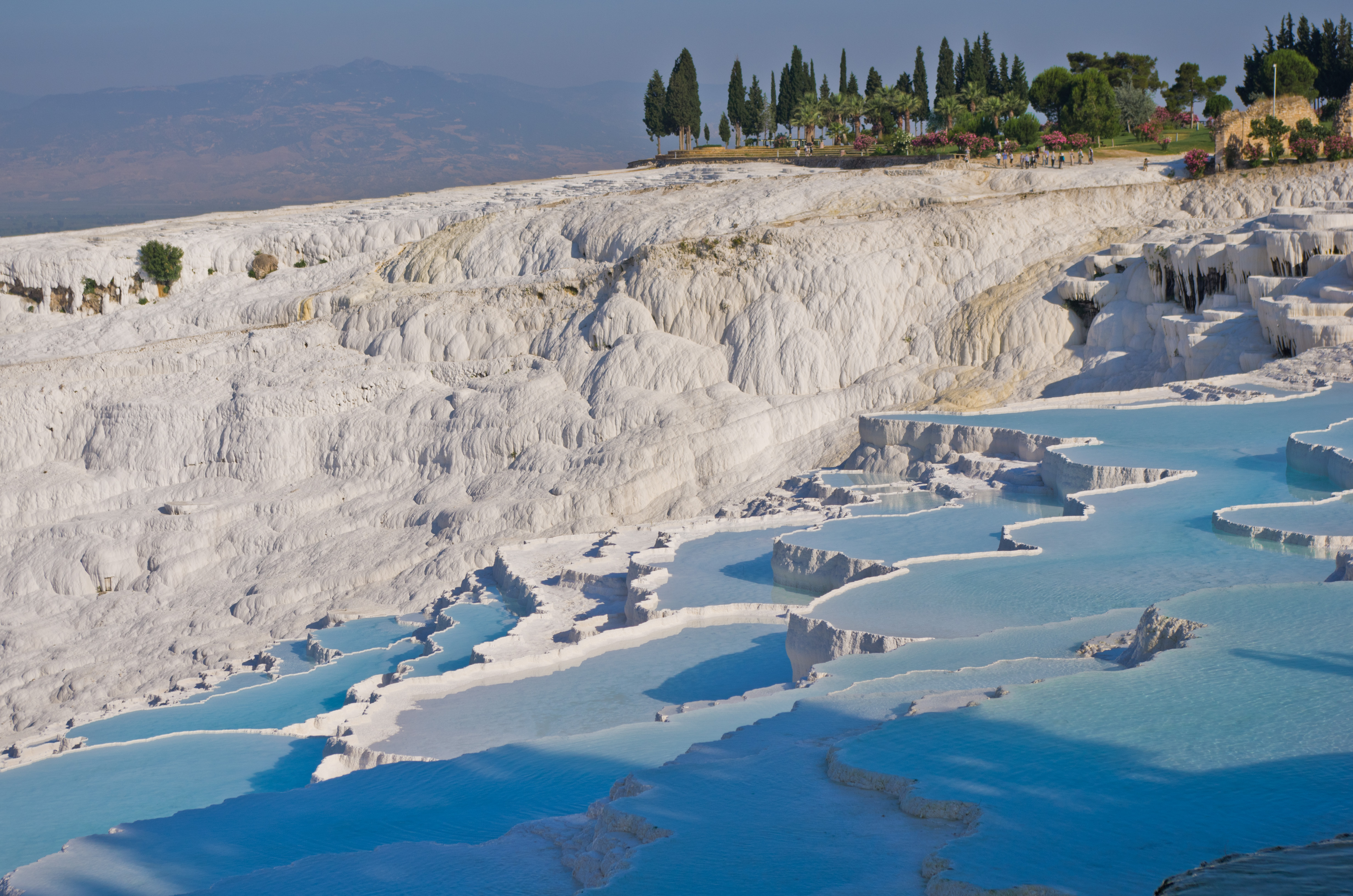
Pamukkale sinter terraces

Pamukkale, (Turkish pronunciation: [pa.mukˈka.le]) meaning "cotton castle" in Turkish, is a natural site in Denizli Province in southwestern Turkey. The area is famous for a carbonate mineral left by the flowing of thermal spring water. It is located in Turkey's Inner Aegean region, in the River Menderes valley, which has a temperate climate for most of the year.

The ancient Greek city of Hierapolis was built on top of the travertine formation which is in total about 2,700 metres (8,860 ft) long, 600 m (1,970 ft) wide and 160 m (525 ft) high. It can be seen from the hills on the opposite side of the valley in the town of Denizli, 20 km away. This area has been drawing visitors to its thermal springs since the time of classical antiquity. The Turkish name refers to the surface of the shimmering, snow-white limestone, shaped over millennia by calcite-rich springs. Dripping slowly down the mountainside, mineral-rich waters collect in and cascade down the mineral terraces, into pools below.

It was added as a UNESCO World Heritage Site in 1988 along with Hierapolis.

== Geology ==
Pamukkale's terraces are made of travertine, a sedimentary rock deposited by mineral water from the hot springs. In this area, there are 17 hot springs with temperatures ranging from 35 °C (95 °F) to 100 °C (212 °F). The water that emerges from the spring is transported 320 metres (1,050 ft) to the head of the travertine terraces and deposits calcium carbonate on a section 60 to 70 metres (200 to 230 ft) long covering an expanse of 24 metres (79 ft) to 30 metres (98 ft). When the water, supersaturated with calcium carbonate, reaches the surface, carbon dioxide de-gasses from it, and calcium carbonate is deposited. Calcium carbonate is deposited by the water as a soft gel which eventually crystallizes into travertine.

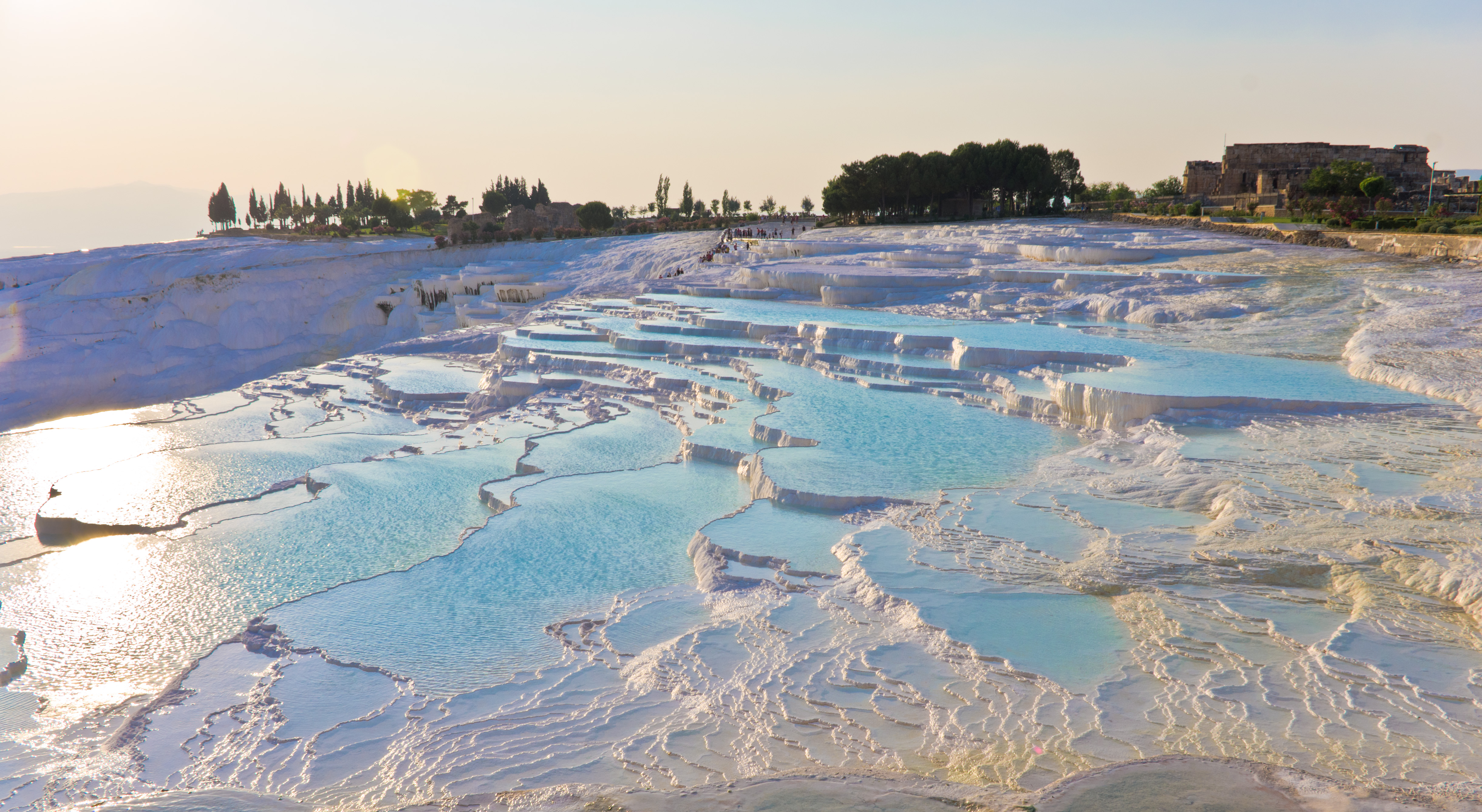
Panoramic view of travertine

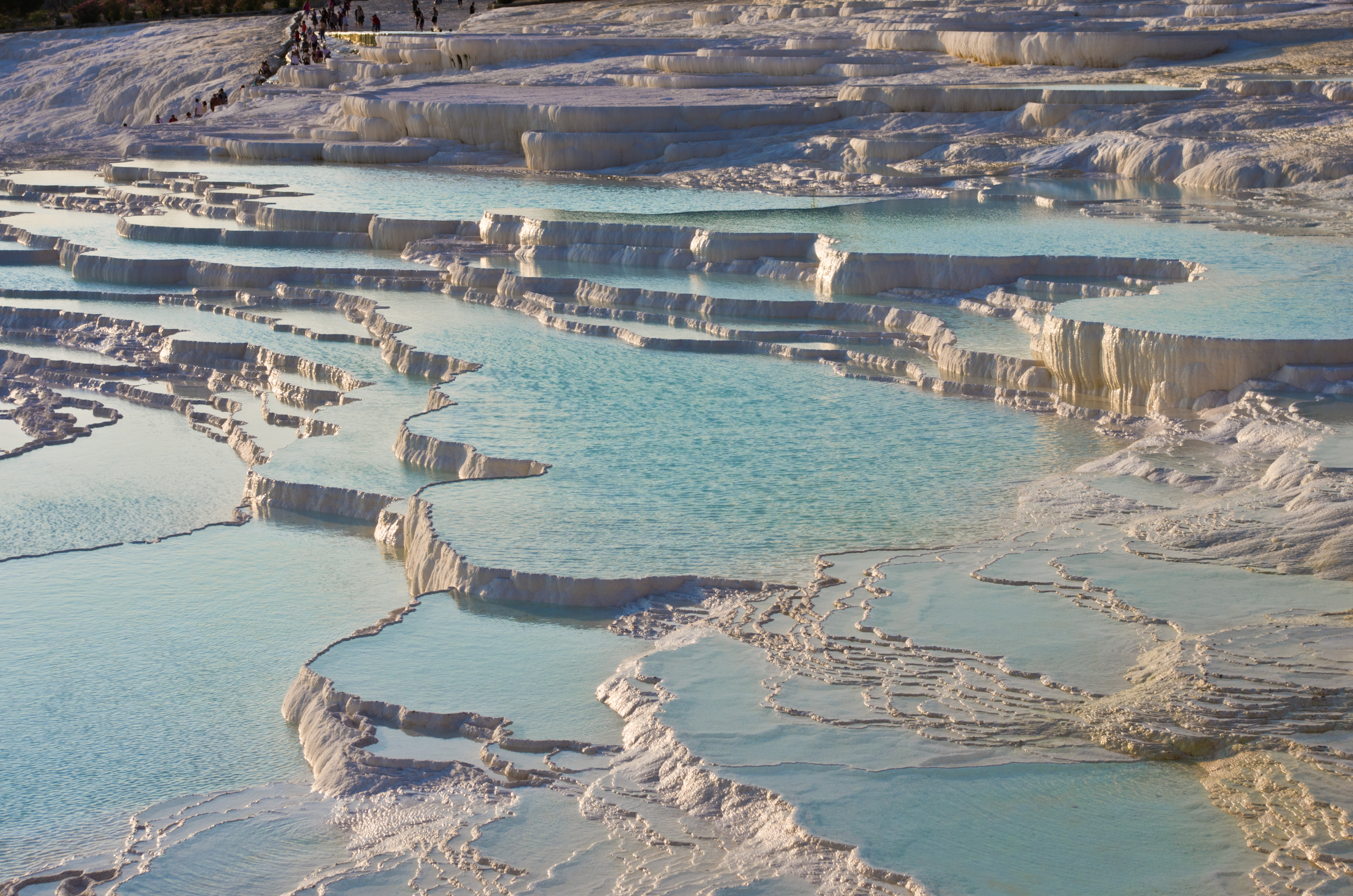
Travertine terrace formations

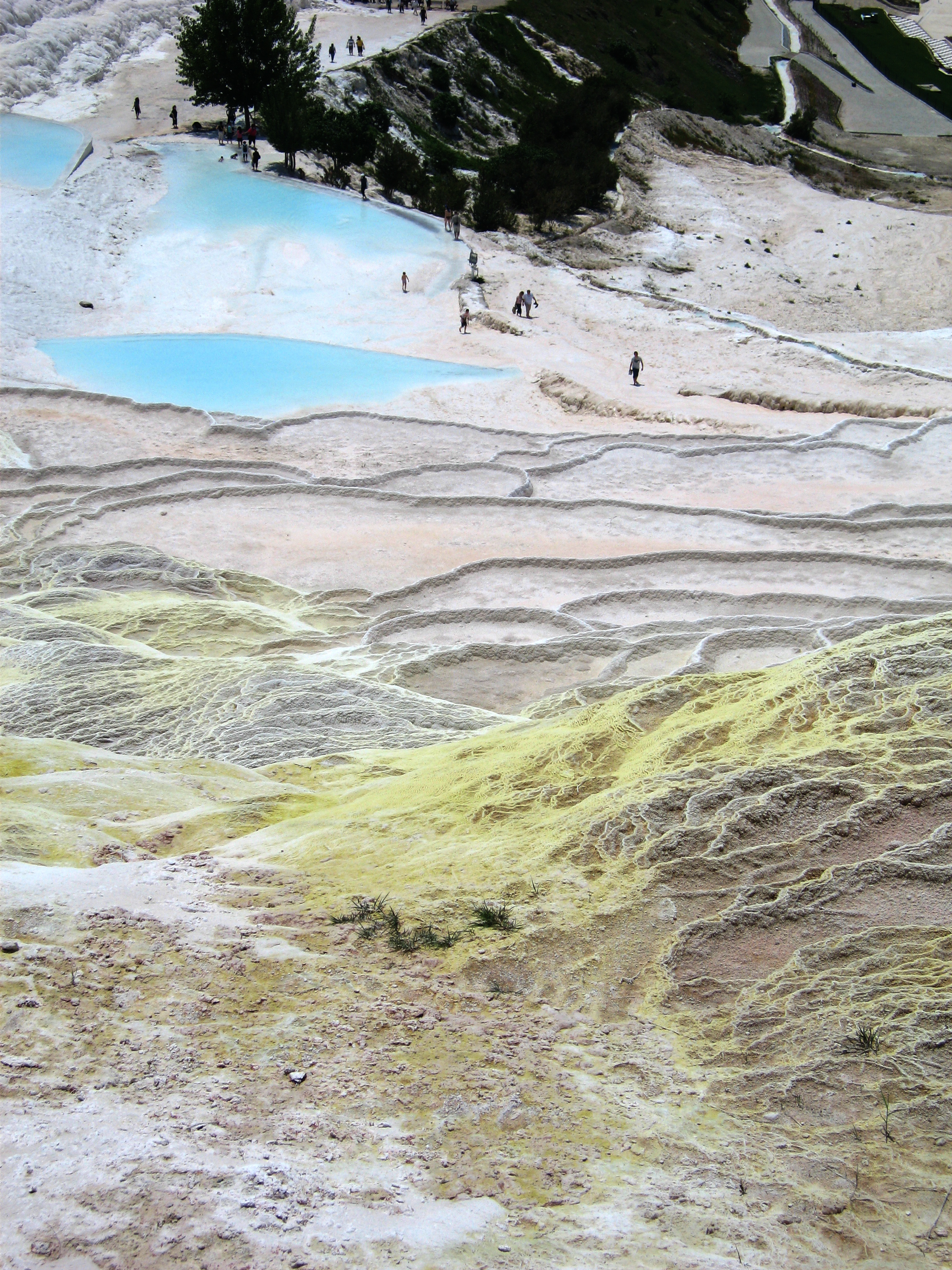
Travertine terraces at a hot spring at Pamukkale

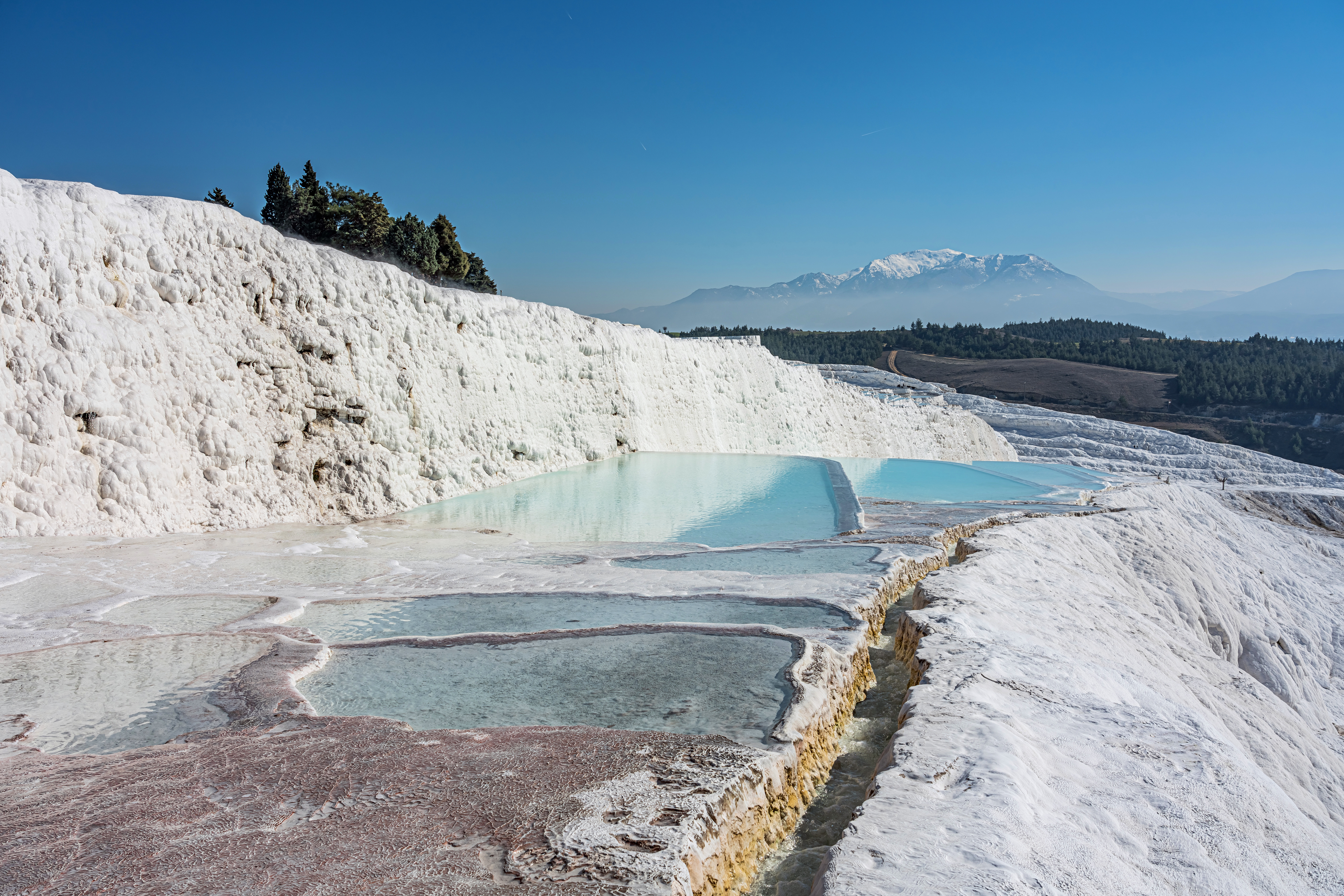
White Terraces (natural travertine formations and hot pools) in Pamukkaleü,

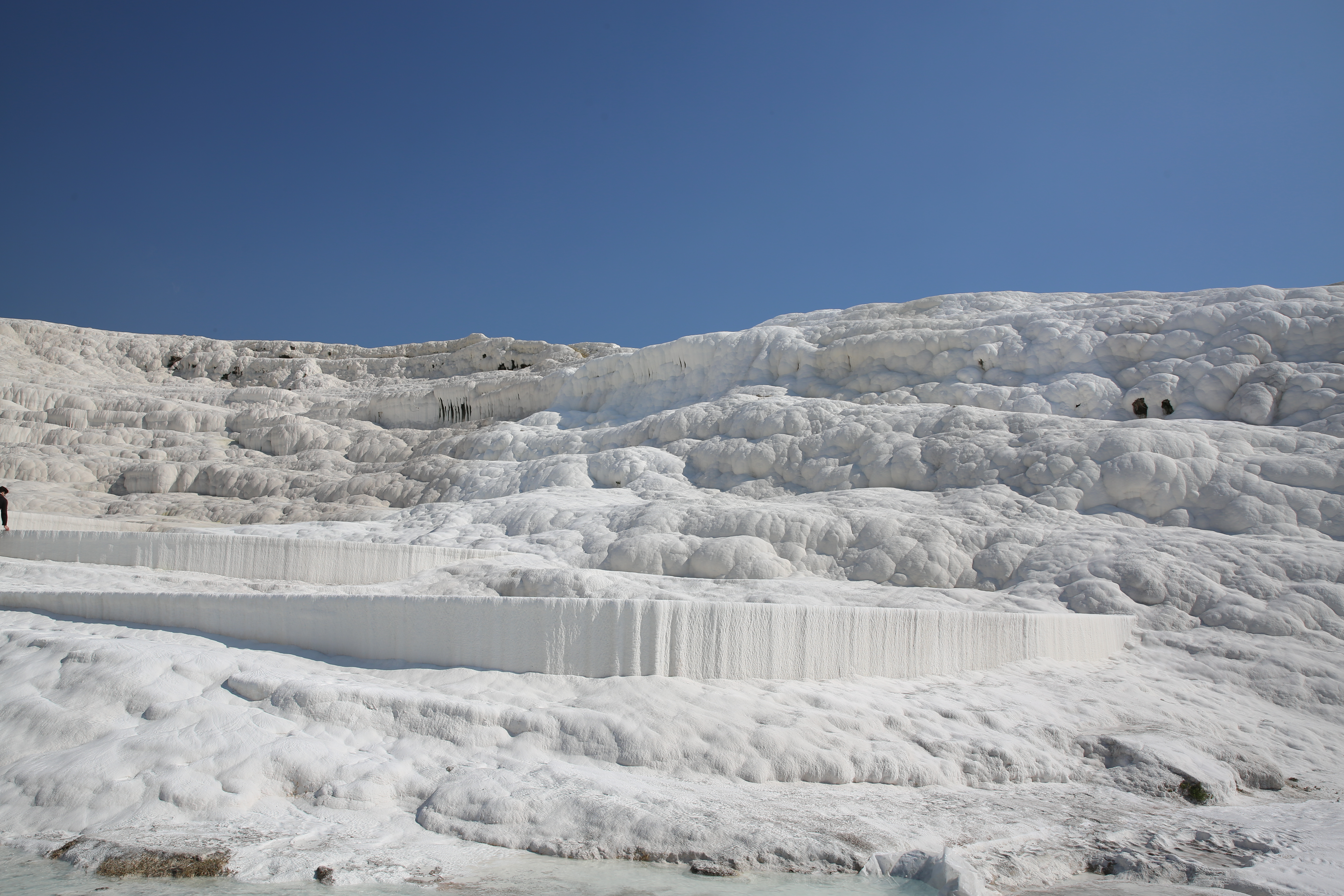
Travertine terraces and calcium formations in Pamukkale

== History ==
There are only a few historical facts known about the origin of the city. No traces of the presence of Hittites or Persians have been found.

=== Iron Age ===
==== Phrygian period ====
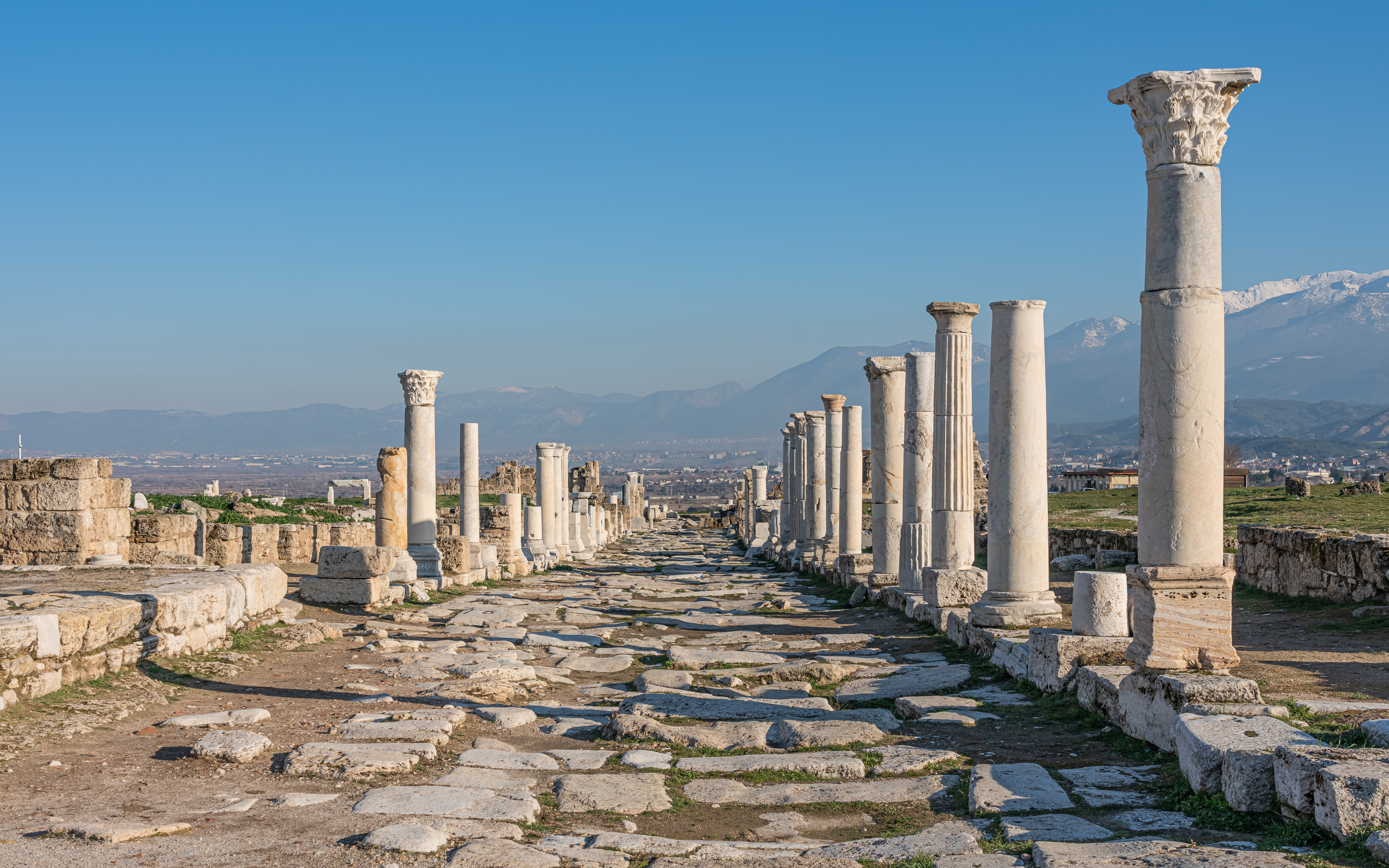
Colonnaded street in Laodicea on the Lycus.

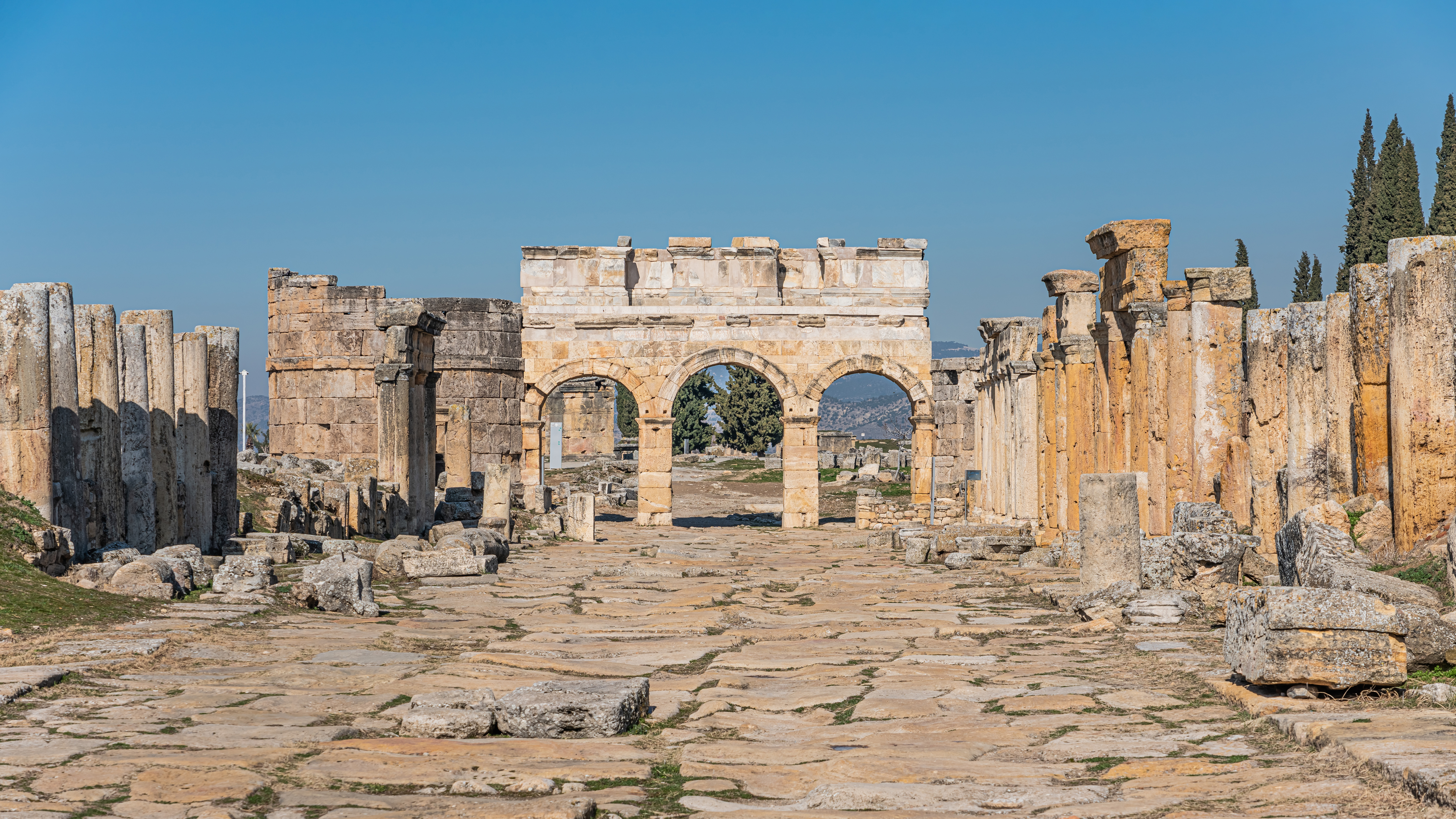
Archaeological site of Hierapolis in Pamukkale. The photo shows the Frontinus (or Domitian) Gate at Frontinus Street.

The Phrygians built a temple, probably in the first half of the 7th century BC. This temple, originally used by the citizens of the nearby town of Laodicea, would later form the centre of Hierapolis.

=== Classical Age ===
==== Hellenistic period ====
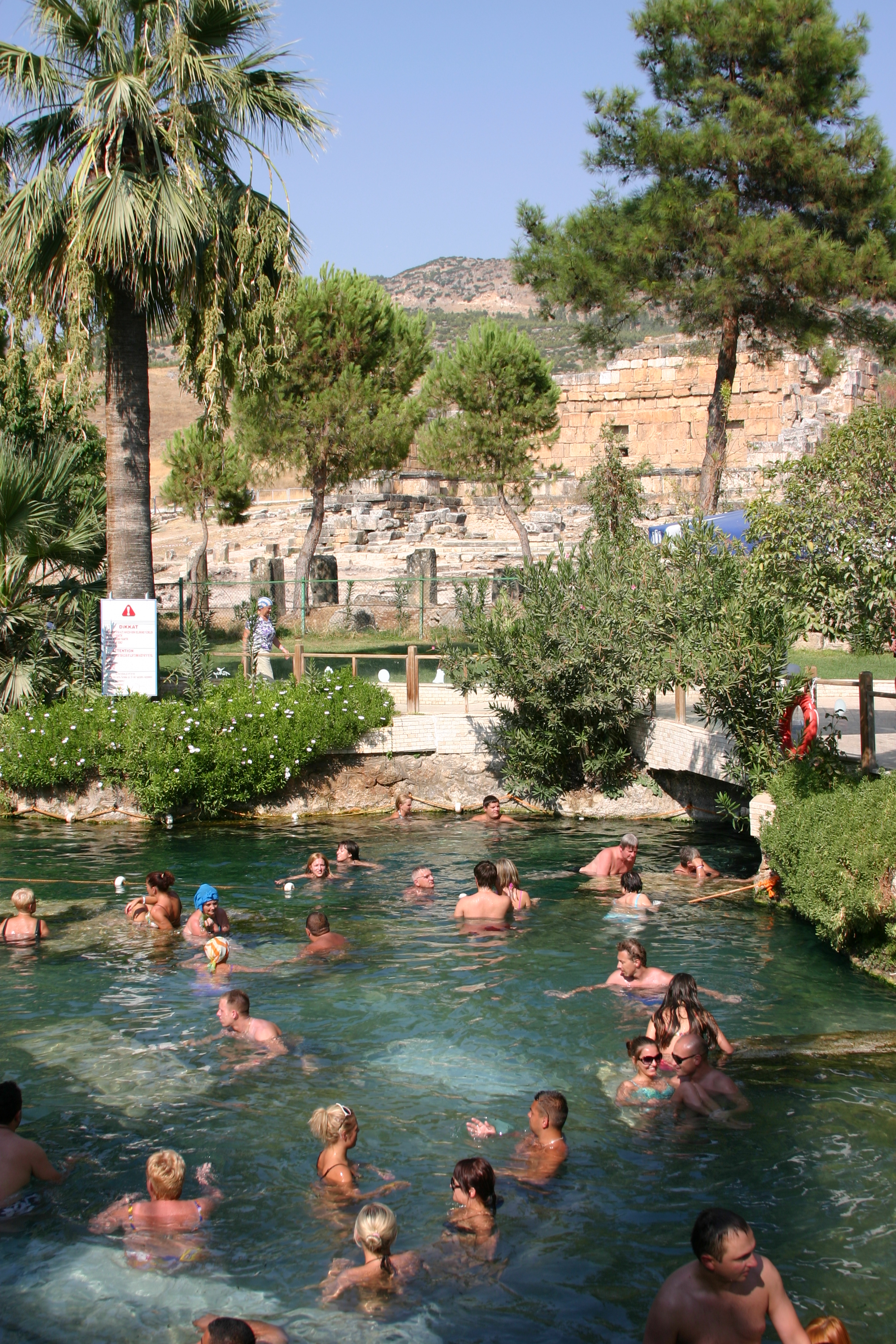
Pools inside the archeological site

Hierapolis was founded as a thermal spa early in the 2nd century BC within the sphere of the Seleucid Empire. Antiochus the Great sent 2,000 Jewish families to Lydia and Phrygia from Babylon and Mesopotamia, later joined by more from Judea. The Jewish congregation grew in Hierapolis and has been estimated as high as 50,000 in 62 BC. Hierapolis became a healing centre where doctors used the thermal springs as a treatment for their patients. The city began minting bronze coins in the 2nd century BC. These coins give the name Hieropolis. It remains unclear whether this name referred to the original temple (ἱερόν, hieron) or honoured Hiera, the wife of Telephus, son of Heracles and the Mysian princess Auge. This name eventually changed into Hierapolis ("holy city").

==== Roman period ====
In 133 BC, when Attalus III died, he bequeathed his kingdom to Rome. Hierapolis thus became part of the Roman province of Asia. In AD 17, during the rule of Emperor Tiberius, a major earthquake destroyed the city.

Through the influence of the Christian Apostle Paul, a church was founded here while he was at Ephesus. The Christian Apostle Philip spent the last years of his life here. The town's Martyrium was alleged to have been built upon the spot where Philip was crucified in AD 80. His daughters were also said to have acted as prophetesses in the region. During the 4th century, the Christians filled Pluto's Gate (a ploutonion) with stones, suggesting that Christianity had become the dominant religion and had begun displacing other faiths in the area. Originally a see of Phrygia Pacatiana, the Byzantine Emperor Justinian raised the bishop of Hierapolis to the rank of metropolitan in 531. The Roman baths were transformed to a Christian basilica. During the Byzantine period, the city continued to flourish and also remained an important centre for Christianity.

=== Museum ===
The museum contains historical artifacts from Hierapolis, as well as those from Laodiceia, Colossae, Tripolis, Attuda and other towns of the Lycos (Çürüksu) valley. The museum also has a section devoted to artifacts found at Beycesultan Hüyük that includes examples of Bronze Age craft. Artifacts from the Caria, Pisidia and Lydia regions are also on display. The museum's exhibition space consists of three halls of the vaulted Hierapolis Bath buildings and the open-air areas in the eastern side which are known to have been used as the library and gymnasium. The artifacts in open exhibition space are mostly marble and stone.

== Tourism and conservation ==
Pamukkale is one of the most visited natural sites in Turkey, attracting more than two million visitors annually. Tourists can bathe in designated thermal pools, including the famous Cleopatra’s Pool, where ancient marble columns lie submerged. To protect the delicate travertine terraces, UNESCO and local authorities regulate the water flow and periodically close certain sections, allowing the formations to regenerate naturally. These efforts aim to preserve Pamukkale’s unique landscape for future generations while supporting the local economy through sustainable tourism.

== World Heritage Site ==
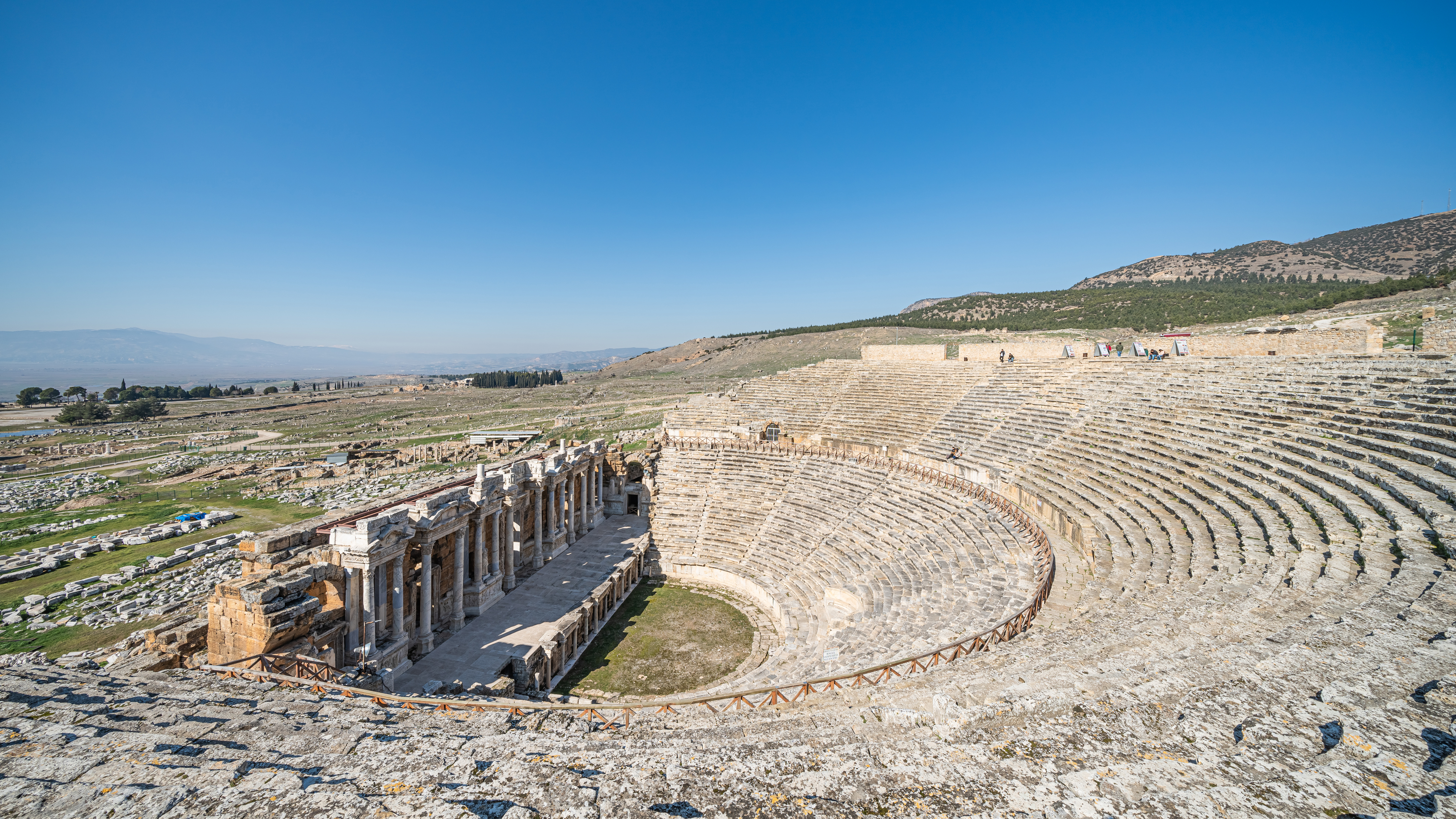
The Theatre of Hierapolis

Pamukkale is recognized as a World Heritage Site together with Hierapolis. Hierapolis-Pamukkale was made a World Heritage Site in 1988. It is a tourist attraction because of this status and its natural beauty.

== Sister cities ==
The city of Pamukkale has two sister cities:

- Eger, Hungary
- Las Vegas, United States

== Similar places ==
These locations are also well known for their travertine formations:

- Badab-e Surt in Iran
- Mammoth Hot Springs in the United States
- Pink and White Terraces in New Zealand
- Hierve el Agua in Mexico
- Bagni San Filippo in Siena, Italy
- Baishuitai in China
- Tatev in Armenia
- Terme di Saturnia in Italy
- Huanglong Scenic and Historic Interest Area in Sichuan, China
- Kaklik Cave in Denizli, Turkey
