= Ploutonion at Hierapolis =

Ancient shrine to god Pluto in Turkey

Pluto's Gate
- Πλουτωνειον (Ancient Greek) (in Ancient Greek); Plutonium (Latin) (in Latin)
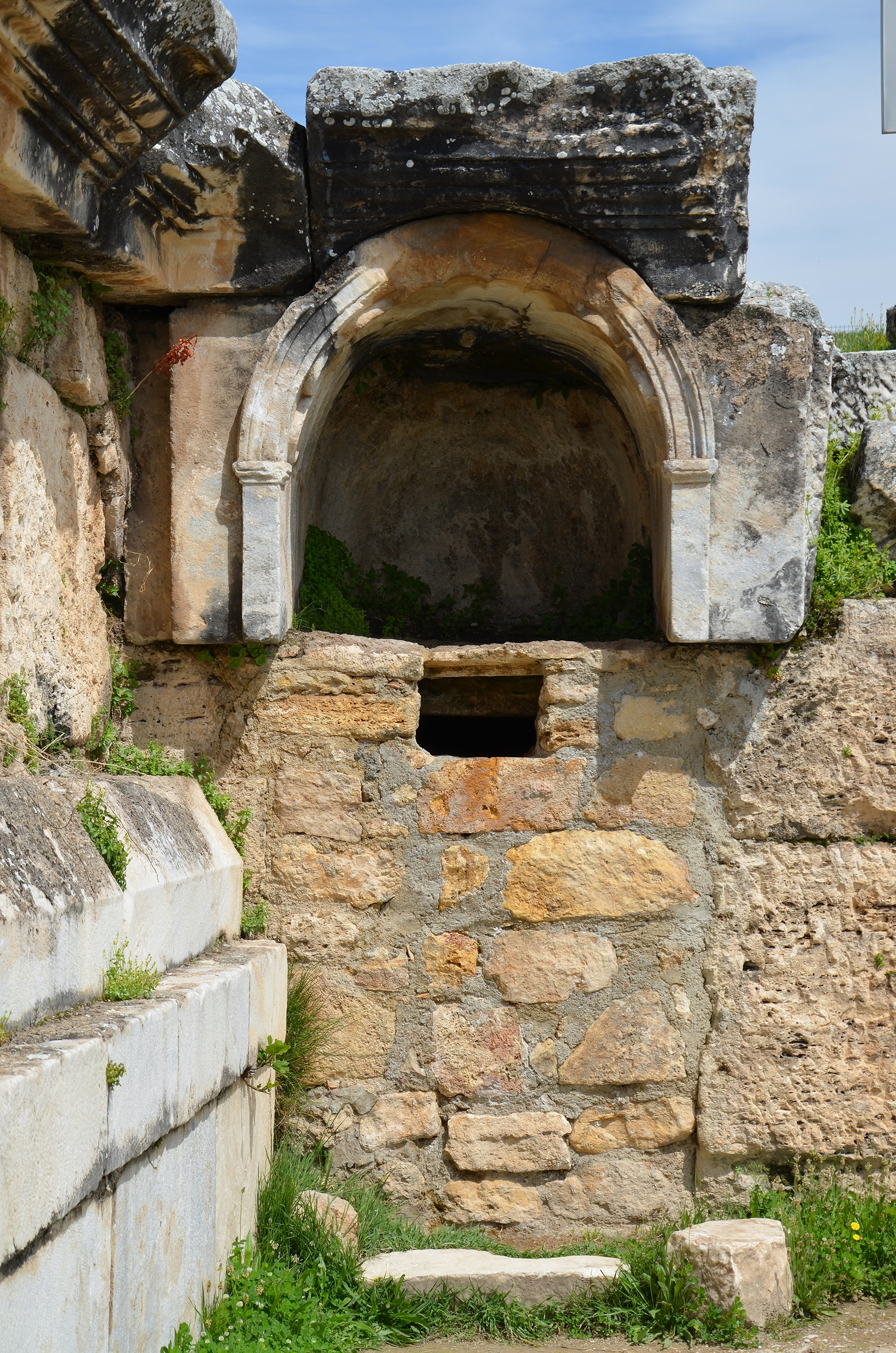
- The ruins of the Old Ploutonion adjacent to the Temple of Apollo, the New Ploutonion is located some 200m east.

- Location within Turkey
- 37°55′36.48″N 29°07′36.53″E
- Type: Sanctuary of Pluto
- Cultures: Ancient Greek, Ancient Roman
- Location: Pamukkale, Denizli Province, Turkey
- Region: Phrygia
- Part of: Hierapolis

History
- Built: 2nd century BC
- Abandoned: 6th century AD

Site notes
- Material: Stone
- Excavation dates: ? - March 2013
- Archaeologists: Francesco D'Andria
- Condition: Ruined

The Ploutonion at Hierapolis (Ancient Greek: Πλουτώνειον Ploutōneion, lit "Place of Pluto"; Latin: Plutonium) or Pluto's Gate was a ploutonion (a religious site dedicated to the god Pluto) in the ancient city of Hierapolis near Pamukkale in modern Turkey's Denizli Province. The site was discovered in 1965 by Italian archaeologists, who published reports on their excavations throughout the decade. Following the studies carried out on site in 1998, a geologist of the Italian National Research Council, Luigi Piccardi, recognized that the origin of both the Ploutonion and of the nearby Apollo's Oracle of Hierapolis was linked to the existence of the surface trace of a seismic fault, on which both sanctuaries were purposely built and which was revered as Gateway of Hades. In 2013, it was further explored by Italian archaeologists led by Francesco D'Andria, a professor of archaeology at the University of Salento. As part of a restoration project, a replica of the marble statue of Hades and Cerberus has been restored to its original place. The statue is known to have been there in ancient times.

== History ==
Though the exact age of the site is currently unknown, the nearby city of Hierapolis was founded around the year 190 BC by the King of Pergamum, Eumenes II.

The site is built on top of a cave which emits toxic gases, hence its use as a ritual passage to the underworld. Ritual animal sacrifices were common at the site. Animals would be thrown into the cave and pulled back out with ropes that had been tied to them. Archaeologists noted that the fumes emitted from the cavern still maintain their deadly properties as they recorded passing birds, attracted by the warm air, suffocated after breathing the toxic fumes.

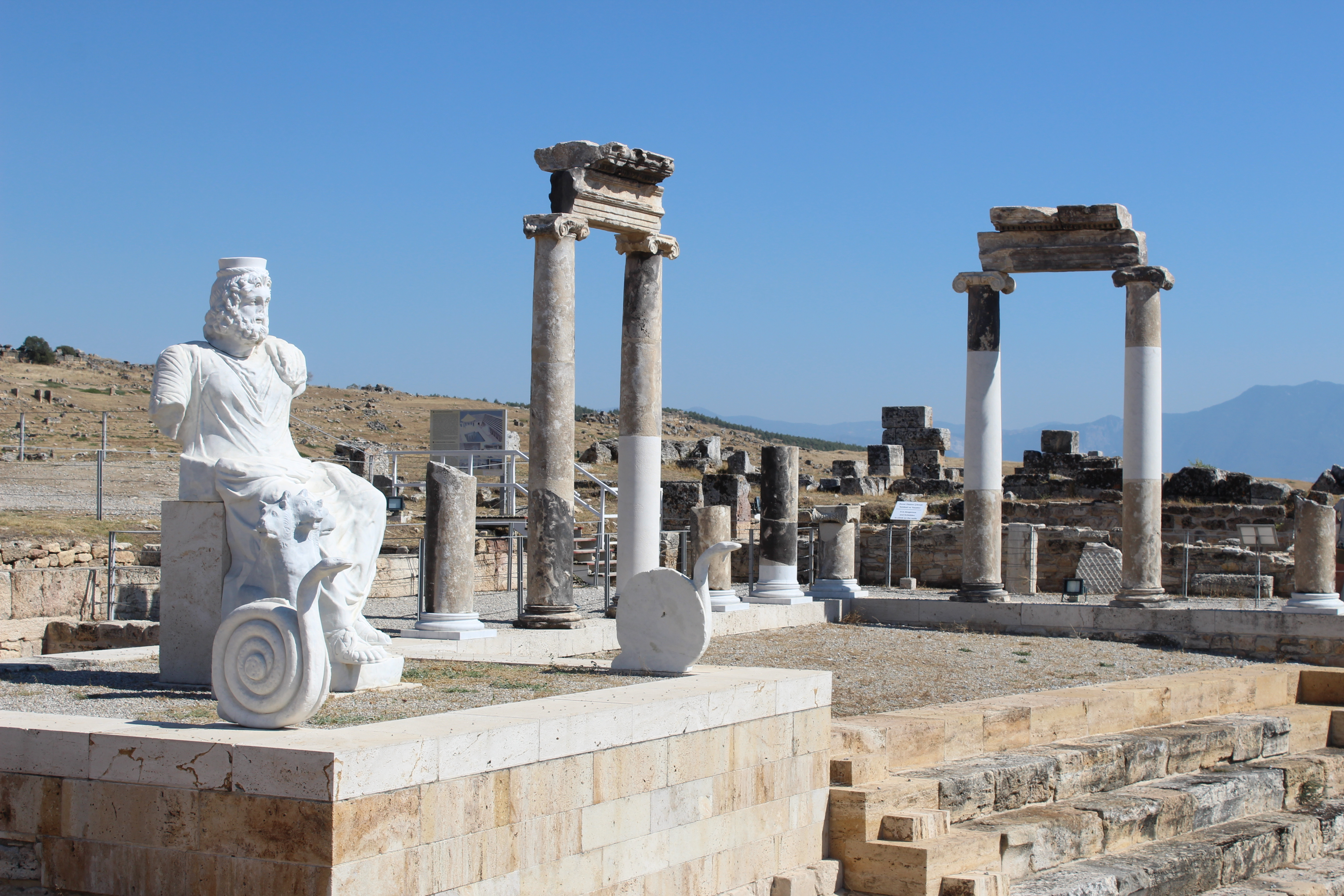
Statue of Pluto

The Ploutonion was described by several ancient writers including Strabo, Cassius Dio and Damascius. It is a small cave, just large enough for one person to enter through a fenced entrance, beyond which stairs go down, and from which emerges suffocating carbon dioxide gas caused by underground geologic activity. Behind the 3 square metres (32 sq ft) roofed chamber is a deep cleft in the rock, through which fast-flowing hot water passes, releasing a sharp-smelling gas. Because the gas was lethal, it was thought that the gas was sent by Pluto, god of the underworld.

During the early years of the town, the castrated priests of Cybele known as the Galli descended into the Ploutonion, crawled over the floor to pockets of oxygen or held their breath. Carbon dioxide is heavier than air and so tends to settle in hollows. They then came up to show that they were immune to the gas. People believed a miracle had happened and that therefore the priests were infused with superior powers and had divine protection.

An enclosed area of 2,000 square metres (22,000 sq ft) stood in front of the entrance. It was covered by a thick layer of suffocating gas, killing everyone who dared to enter this area. The priests sold birds and other animals to the visitors, so that they could try out how deadly this enclosed area was. Visitors could (for a fee) ask questions of the oracle of Pluto. This provided a considerable source of income for the temple. The entrance to the Ploutonion was closed off during the Christian times.

The ancient historian Strabo described the gate as follows:

Any animal that passes inside meets instant death. I threw in sparrows and they immediately breathed their last and fell.

=== Destruction ===
Archaeological evidence suggests that the site was fully functional until the 4th century AD, but remained a place of sporadic visitation by visitors for the next two centuries. The temple was destroyed in the 6th century AD by earthquakes.
