= List of populated places in Aydın Province =

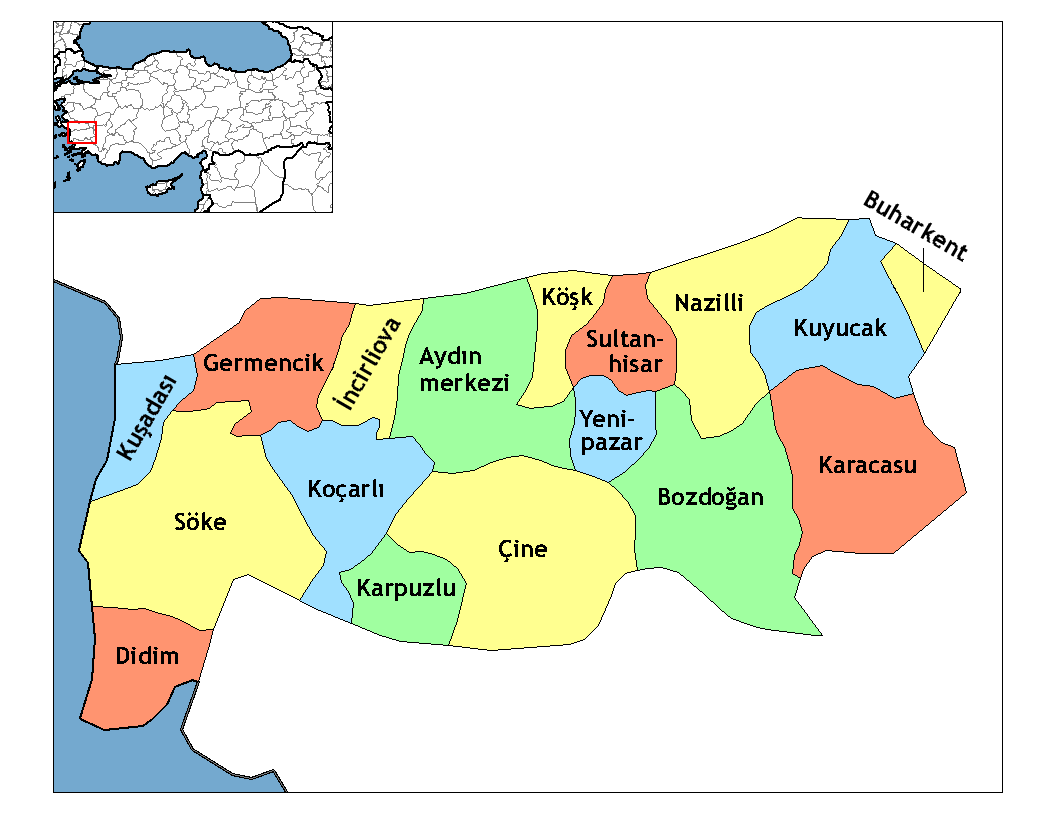
Aydın Province

Below is the list of populated places in Aydın Province, Turkey by the districts. In the following lists first place in each list is the administrative center of the district.

== Aydın ==
- Aydın
- Alanlı, Aydın
- Alatepe, Aydın
- Ambarcık, Aydın
- Armutlu, Aydın
- Aşağıkayacık, Aydın
- Bademli, Aydın
- Balıkköy, Aydın
- Baltaköy, Aydın
- Böcek, Aydın
- Çayyüzü, Aydın
- Çeştepe, Aydın
- Çiftlikköy, Aydın
- Dağeymiri, Aydın
- Dalama, Aydın
- Danişment, Aydın
- Dereköy, Aydın
- Doğan, Aydın
- Eğrikavak, Aydın
- Emirdoğan, Aydın
- Gödrenli, Aydın
- Gölcük, Aydın
- Gölhisar, Aydın
- Gözpınar, Aydın
- Horozköy, Aydın
- Işıklı, Aydın
- İlyasdere, Aydın
- İmamköy, Aydın
- Kadıköy, Aydın
- Kalfaköy, Aydın
- Karahayıt, Aydın
- Karaköy, Aydın
- Kardeşköy, Aydın
- Kenger, Aydın
- Kırıklar, Aydın
- Kızılcaköy, Aydın
- Kocagür, Aydın
- Konuklu, Aydın
- Kozalaklı, Aydın
- Kuloğullar, Aydın
- Kuyucular, Aydın
- Kuyulu, Aydın
- Mesutlu, Aydın
- Musluca, Aydın
- Ortaköy, Aydın
- Ovaeymir, Aydın
- Pınardere, Aydın
- Savrandere, Aydın
- Serçeköy, Aydın
- Sıralılar, Aydın
- Şahnalı, Aydın
- Şevketiye, Aydın
- Tepecik, Aydın
- Tepeköy, Aydın
- Terziler, Aydın
- Umurlu, Aydın
- Yağcılar, Aydın
- Yeniköy (Dalama), Aydın
- Yeniköy, Aydın
- Yılmazköy, Aydın
- Yukarıkayacık, Aydın
- Zeytinköy, Aydın

== Bozdoğan ==
- Bozdoğan
- Akseki, Bozdoğan
- Akyaka, Bozdoğan
- Alamut, Bozdoğan
- Alhisar, Bozdoğan
- Altıntaş, Bozdoğan
- Amasya, Bozdoğan
- Asma, Bozdoğan
- Başalan, Bozdoğan
- Çamlıdere, Bozdoğan
- Dutağaç, Bozdoğan
- Dömen, Bozdoğan
- Güney, Bozdoğan
- Güneyyaka, Bozdoğan
- Güre, Bozdoğan
- Güvenir, Bozdoğan
- Haydere, Bozdoğan
- Hışımlar, Bozdoğan
- Kakkalan, Bozdoğan
- Kamışlar, Bozdoğan
- Karaahmetler, Bozdoğan
- Kavaklı, Bozdoğan
- Kazandere, Bozdoğan
- Kemer, Bozdoğan
- Kılavuzlar, Bozdoğan
- Kızılca, Bozdoğan
- Kızıltepe, Bozdoğan
- Konaklı, Bozdoğan
- Koyuncular, Bozdoğan
- Körteke, Bozdoğan
- Olukbaşı, Bozdoğan
- Osmaniye, Bozdoğan
- Örencik, Bozdoğan
- Örentaht, Bozdoğan
- Örmepınar, Bozdoğan
- Örtülü, Bozdoğan
- Pınarlı, Bozdoğan
- Seki, Bozdoğan
- Sırma, Bozdoğan
- Tütüncüler, Bozdoğan
- Yaka, Bozdoğan
- Yazıkent, Bozdoğan
- Yenice, Bozdoğan
- Yeniköy, Bozdoğan
- Yeşilçam, Bozdoğan
- Ziyaretli, Bozdoğan

== Buharkent ==
- Buharkent
- Ericek, Buharkent
- Feslek Gelenbe, Buharkent
- Gündoğan, Buharkent
- Kızıldere, Buharkent
- Muratdağı, Buharkent
- Ortakçı, Buharkent
- Savcıllı, Buharkent

== Çine ==
- Çine
- Akçaova, Çine
- Akdam, Çine
- Alabayır, Çine
- Altınabat, Çine
- Altınova, Çine
- Bağlarbaşı, Çine
- Bahçearası, Çine
- Bedirler, Çine
- Bereket, Çine
- Bölüntü, Çine
- Bucak, Çine
- Camızağılı, Çine
- Cumalı, Çine
- Çaltı, Çine
- Çatak, Çine
- Çöğürlük, Çine
- Dereli, Çine
- Doğanyurt, Çine
- Dorumlar, Çine
- Dutluoluk, Çine
- Elderesi, Çine
- Esentepe, Çine
- Eskiçine, Çine
- Evciler, Çine
- Gökyaka, Çine
- Hacıpaşalar, Çine
- Hallaçlar, Çine
- Hasanlar, Çine
- İbrahimkavağı, Çine
- Kabalar, Çine
- Kabataş, Çine
- Kadılar, Çine
- Kahraman, Çine
- Karahayıt, Çine
- Karakollar, Çine
- Karanfiller, Çine
- Karğı, Çine
- Kasar, Çine
- Kavşıt, Çine
- Kırkışık, Çine
- Kırksakallar, Çine
- Kızılgüney, Çine
- Kirazderesi, Çine
- Kuruköy, Çine
- Mutaflar, Çine
- Ovacık, Çine
- Özeren, Çine
- Sağlık, Çine
- Saraçlar, Çine
- Sarıköy, Çine
- Sarnıç, Çine
- Seferler, Çine
- Soğukoluk, Çine
- Söğütçük, Çine
- Subaşı, Çine
- Taşoluk, Çine
- Tatarmemişler, Çine
- Tepeköy, Çine
- Topçam, Çine
- Umurköy, Çine
- Ünlüce, Çine
- Yağcılar, Çine
- Yeniköy, Çine
- Yeşilköy, Çine
- Yolboyu, Çine
- Yörükler, Çine

== Didim ==
- Didim
- Akbük, Didim
- Akköy, Didim
- Ak-Yeniköy, Didim
- Balat, Didim
- Batıköy, Didim
- Denizköy, Didim
- Yalıköy, Didim

== Germencik ==
- Germencik
- Abdurrahmanlar, Germencik
- Alangüllü, Germencik
- Balatçık, Germencik
- Bozköy, Germencik
- Çamköy, Germencik
- Çarıklar, Germencik
- Dağkaraağaç, Germencik
- Dağyeni, Germencik
- Dampınar, Germencik
- Dereköy, Germencik
- Gümüşköy, Germencik
- Gümüşyeniköy, Germencik
- Habibler, Germencik
- Hıdırbeyli, Germencik
- Karaağaçlı, Germencik
- Kızılcagedik, Germencik
- Kızılcapınar, Germencik
- Meşeli, Germencik
- Moralı, Germencik
- Mursallı, Germencik
- Naipli, Germencik
- Neşetiye, Germencik
- Ortaklar, Germencik
- Ömerbeyli, Germencik
- Reisköy, Germencik
- Selatin, Germencik
- Tekin, Germencik
- Turanlar, Germencik
- Uzunkum, Germencik
- Üzümlü, Germencik

== İncirliova ==
- * İncirliova
- * Acarlar, İncirliova
- * Akçeşme, İncirliova
- * Arpadere, İncirliova
- * Arzular, İncirliova
- * Beyköy, İncirliova
- * Dereağzı, İncirliova
- * Eğrek, İncirliova
- * Erbeyli, İncirliova
- * Gerenkova, İncirliova
- * Hacıaliobası, İncirliova
- * Hamitler, İncirliova
- * İkizdere, İncirliova
- * İsafakılar, İncirliova
- * Karabağ, İncirliova
- * Karagözler, İncirliova
- * Köprüova, İncirliova
- * Osmanbükü, İncirliova
- * Palamutköy, İncirliova
- * Sandıklı, İncirliova
- * Sınırteke, İncirliova
- * Şirindere, İncirliova
- * Yazıdere, İncirliova

== Karacasu ==
- Karacasu
- Alemler, Karacasu
- Aşağıgörle, Karacasu
- Ataeymir, Karacasu
- Ataköy, Karacasu
- Bahçeköy, Karacasu
- Bingeç, Karacasu
- Çamarası, Karacasu
- Çamköy, Karacasu
- Dedeler, Karacasu
- Dereköy, Karacasu
- Dikmen, Karacasu
- Esençay, Karacasu
- Geyre, Karacasu
- Görle, Karacasu
- Güzelbeyli, Karacasu
- Güzelköy, Karacasu
- Hacıhıdırlar, Karacasu
- Işıklar, Karacasu
- Karabağlar, Karacasu
- Karacaören, Karacasu
- Nargedik, Karacasu
- Palamutçuk, Karacasu
- Tekeliler, Karacasu
- Tepecik, Karacasu
- Yaykın, Karacasu
- Yazır, Karacasu
- Yenice, Karacasu
- Yeniköy, Karacasu
- Yeşilköy, Karacasu
- Yeşilyurt, Karacasu
- Yolaltı, Karacasu
- Yolüstü, Karacasu

== Karpuzlu ==
- Karpuzlu
- Abak, Karpuzlu
- Akçaabat, Karpuzlu
- Cumalar, Karpuzlu
- Çobanisa, Karpuzlu
- Ektirli, Karpuzlu
- Gölcük, Karpuzlu
- Güney, Karpuzlu
- Hatıpkışla, Karpuzlu
- Işıklar, Karpuzlu
- Koğuk, Karpuzlu
- Meriçler, Karpuzlu
- Mutluca, Karpuzlu
- Ovapınarı, Karpuzlu
- Ömerler, Karpuzlu
- Şenköy, Karpuzlu
- Tekeler, Karpuzlu
- Ulukonak, Karpuzlu
- Umcular, Karpuzlu
- Yağşılar, Karpuzlu

== Koçarlı ==
- Koçarlı
- Akmescit, Koçarlı
- Bağarcık, Koçarlı
- Bağcılar, Koçarlı
- Bıyıklı, Koçarlı
- Birci, Koçarlı
- Boğaziçi, Koçarlı
- Boydere, Koçarlı
- Büyükdere, Koçarlı
- Cincin, Koçarlı
- Çakırbeyli, Koçarlı
- Çakmar, Koçarlı
- Çallı, Koçarlı
- Çeşmeköy, Koçarlı
- Çulhalar, Koçarlı
- Dedeköy, Koçarlı
- Dereköy, Koçarlı
- Esentepe, Koçarlı
- Evsekler, Koçarlı
- Gaffarlar, Koçarlı
- Gözkaya, Koçarlı
- Güdüşlü, Koçarlı
- Hacıhamzalar, Koçarlı
- Halilbeyli, Koçarlı
- Haydarlı, Koçarlı
- Karaağaç, Koçarlı
- Karacaören, Koçarlı
- Karadut, Koçarlı
- Kasaplar, Koçarlı
- Kızılcabölük, Koçarlı
- Kızılkaya, Koçarlı
- Kullar, Koçarlı
- Kuşlarbelen, Koçarlı
- Mersinbelen, Koçarlı
- Orhaniye, Koçarlı
- Sapalan, Koçarlı
- Satılar, Koçarlı
- Sobuca, Koçarlı
- Şahinciler, Koçarlı
- Şenköy, Koçarlı
- Taşköy, Koçarlı
- Tekeli, Koçarlı
- Tığıllar, Koçarlı
- Timinciler, Koçarlı
- Yağcıdere, Koçarlı
- Yağhanlı, Koçarlı
- Yeniköy, Koçarlı
- Zeytinköy, Koçarlı

== Köşk ==
- Köşk
- Ahatlar, Köşk
- Akçaköy, Köşk
- Baklaköy, Köşk
- Başçayır, Köşk
- Beyköy, Köşk
- Cumadere, Köşk
- Cumayanı, Köşk
- Çiftlikköy, Köşk
- Gökkiriş, Köşk
- Gündoğan, Köşk
- Güzelköy, Köşk
- Ilıdağ, Köşk
- Karatepe, Köşk
- Ketenyeri, Köşk
- Kıran, Köşk
- Kızılcaköy, Köşk
- Kızılcayer, Köşk
- Koçak, Köşk
- Menteşeler, Köşk
- Mezeköy, Köşk
- Ovaköy, Köşk
- Sarıçam, Köşk
- Uzundere, Köşk
- Yavuzköy, Köşk

== Kuşadası ==
- Kuşadası
- Caferli, Kuşadası
- Çınarköy, Kuşadası
- Davutlar, Kuşadası
- Güzelçamlı, Kuşadası
- Kirazlı, Kuşadası
- Soğucak, Kuşadası
- Yaylaköy, Kuşadası
- Yeniköy, Kuşadası

== Kuyucak ==
- Kuyucak
- Aksaz, Kuyucak
- Azizabat, Kuyucak
- Başaran, Kuyucak
- Belenova, Kuyucak
- Beşeylül, Kuyucak
- Bucakköy, Kuyucak
- Çamdibi, Kuyucak
- Çobanisa, Kuyucak
- Dereköy, Kuyucak
- Gencelli, Kuyucak
- Gencellidere, Kuyucak
- Horsunlu, Kuyucak
- İğdecik, Kuyucak
- Karapınar, Kuyucak
- Kayran, Kuyucak
- Kurtuluş, Kuyucak
- Musakolu, Kuyucak
- Ovacık, Kuyucak
- Ören, Kuyucak
- Pamucak, Kuyucak
- Pamukören, Kuyucak
- Sarıcaova, Kuyucak
- Taşoluk, Kuyucak
- Yamalak, Kuyucak
- Yaylalı, Kuyucak
- Yeşildere, Kuyucak
- Yöre, Kuyucak
- Yukarıyakacık, Kuyucak

== Nazili ==
- Nazilli
- Akpınar, Nazilli
- Aksu, Nazilli
- Apaklar, Nazilli
- Aşağıörencik, Nazilli
- Aşağıyakacık, Nazilli
- Bağcıllı, Nazilli
- Bayındır, Nazilli
- Beğerli, Nazilli
- Bekirler, Nazilli
- Bereketli, Nazilli
- Bozyurt, Nazilli
- Çatak, Nazilli
- Çaylı, Nazilli
- Çobanlar, Nazilli
- Dallıca, Nazilli
- Demirciler, Nazilli
- Dereağzı, Nazilli
- Derebaşı, Nazilli
- Dualar, Nazilli
- Durasıllı, Nazilli
- Esenköy, Nazilli
- Esentepe, Nazilli
- Eycelli, Nazilli
- Gedik, Nazilli
- Gedikaltı, Nazilli
- Güzelköy, Nazilli
- Hamidiye, Nazilli
- Hamzallı, Nazilli
- Hasköy, Nazilli
- Haydarlı, Nazilli
- Hisarcık, Nazilli
- Işıklar, Nazilli
- İsabeyli, Nazilli
- Kahvederesi, Nazilli
- Karahallı, Nazilli
- Kardeşköy, Nazilli
- Kaşıkçılar, Nazilli
- Kavacık, Nazilli
- Kestel, Nazilli
- Ketendere, Nazilli
- Ketenova, Nazilli
- Kırcaklı, Nazilli
- Kızıldere, Nazilli
- Kocakesik, Nazilli
- Kozdere, Nazilli
- Kuşçular, Nazilli
- Mescitli, Nazilli
- Ocaklı, Nazilli
- Ovacık, Nazilli
- Pirlibey, Nazilli
- Rahmanlar, Nazilli
- Sailer, Nazilli
- Samailli, Nazilli
- Sevindikli, Nazilli
- Sinekçiler, Nazilli
- Şimşelli, Nazilli
- Toygar, Nazilli
- Uzunçam, Nazilli
- Yalınkuyu, Nazilli
- Yazırlı, Nazilli
- Yellice, Nazilli
- Yukarıörencik, Nazilli

== Söke ==
- Söke
- Ağaçlı, Söke
- Akçakaya, Söke
- Akçakonak, Söke
- Argavlı, Söke
- Arslanyaylası, Söke
- Atburgazı, Söke
- Avcılar, Söke
- Avşar, Söke
- Bağarası, Söke
- Bayırdamı, Söke
- Burunköy, Söke
- Çalıköy, Söke
- Çalışlı, Söke
- Çavdar, Söke
- Demirçay, Söke
- Doğanbey, Söke
- Gölbent, Söke
- Güllübahçe, Söke
- Güneyyaka, Söke
- Güzeltepe, Söke
- Karaatlı, Söke
- Karacahayıt, Söke
- Karakaya, Söke
- Kaygıllı, Söke
- Kisir, Söke
- Köprüalan, Söke
- Nalbantlar, Söke
- Özbaşı, Söke
- Pamukçular, Söke
- Sarıkemer, Söke
- Savuca, Söke
- Sayrakçı, Söke
- Sazlı, Söke
- Serçin, Söke
- Sofular, Söke
- Tuzburgazı, Söke
- Yamaç, Söke
- Yenidoğan, Söke
- Yeniköy, Söke
- Yeşilköy, Söke
- Yuvaca, Söke

== Sultanhisar ==
- Sultanhisar
- Atça, Sultanhisar
- Demirhan, Sultanhisar
- Eskihisar, Sultanhisar
- Güvendik, Sultanhisar
- İncealan, Sultanhisar
- Kabaca, Sultanhisar
- Kavaklı, Sultanhisar
- Kılavuzlar, Sultanhisar
- Malgaçemir, Sultanhisar
- Malgaçmustafa, Sultanhisar
- Salavatlı, Sultanhisar
- Uzunlar, Sultanhisar
- Yağdere, Sultanhisar

== Yenipazar ==
- Yenipazar
- Alhan, Yenipazar
- Alioğullar, Yenipazar
- Çavdar, Yenipazar
- Çulhan, Yenipazar
- Dereköy, Yenipazar, Aydın
- Direcik, Yenipazar
- Donduran, Yenipazar
- Eğridere, Yenipazar
- Hacıköseler, Yenipazar
- Hamzabali, Yenipazar
- Karacaören, Yenipazar
- Karaçakal, Yenipazar
- Koyunlar, Yenipazar
- Paşaköy, Yenipazar

== Recent development ==
According to Law act no 6360, all Turkish provinces with a population more than 750 000, were renamed as metropolitan municipality. Furthermore, the central district was renamed as Efeler. All districts in those provinces became second level municipalities and all villages in those districts were renamed as a neighborhoods . Thus the villages listed above are officially neighborhoods of Aydın.
