= Esentepe =

Esentepe may refer to the following places:

== Cyprus ==
- Esentepe, Turkish name of Agios Amvrosios, Kyrenia

== Turkey ==
- Esentepe, Adıyaman
- Esentepe, Alanya
- Esentepe, Çine
- Esentepe, Cumayeri
- Esentepe, Dikili
- Esentepe, Düzce
- Esentepe, Kayapınar
- Esentepe, Koçarlı
- Esentepe, Merzifon
- Esentepe, Nazilli
- Esentepe, Ortaköy
- Esentepe, Şişli, a neighborhood in Şişli district of Istanbul province
- Esentepe, Vezirköprü
