= Yeşilköy (disambiguation) =

Yeşilköy (formerly San Stefano) is a neighbourhood in Bakırköy district of Istanbul, Turkey.

Yeşilköy (literally "green village" in Turkish) may also refer to:

- Yeşilköy, Akçakoca
- Yeşilköy, Bayramiç
- Yeşilköy, Biga
- Yeşilköy, Bolu, a village in Bolu district of Bolu Province, Turkey
- Yeşilköy, Borçka, a village in Borçka district of Artvin Province, Turkey
- Yeşilköy, Çine, a village in Çine district of Aydın Province, Turkey
- Yeşilköy, Ergani
- Yeşilköy, Finike, a village in Finike district of Antalya Province, Turkey
- Yeşilköy, Hatay, a town in Dörtyol district of Hatay Province, Turkey
- Yeşilköy, Haymana, a village in Haymana district of Ankara Province, Turkey
- Yeşilköy, Hopa, a village in Hopa district of Artvin Province, Turkey
- Yeşilköy, İvrindi, a village in Balıkesir Province, Turkey
- Yeşilköy, Karacasu, a village in Karacasu district of Aydın Province, Turkey
- Yeşilköy, Kargı
- Yeşilköy, Kaş, a village in Kaş district of Antalya Province, Turkey
- Yeşilköy, Keşan
- Yeşilköy, Kızılcahamam, a village in tKızılcahamam district of Ankara Province, Turkey
- Yeşilköy, Kovancılar
- Yeşilköy, Kumluca, a village in Kumluca district of Antalya Province, Turkey
- Yeşilköy, Mut, a village in Mut district of Mersin Province, Turkey
- Yeşilköy, Silvan
- Yeşilköy, Sivrihisar, a village in Sivrihisar district of Eskişehir Province, Turkey
- Yeşilköy, Söke, a village in Söke district of Aydın Province, Turkey
- Yeşilköy, Tavas
- Yeşilköy, Yenice
- Yeşilköy, Yumurtalık, a village in Yumurtalık district of Adana Province, Turkey
- Agios Andronikos (Yeşilköy), a village in northern Cyprus

== Other uses ==
- Yeşilköy Feneri, a lighthouse in Yeşilköy, Istanbul
- Yeşilköy International Airport, former name of Atatürk International Airport in Istanbul
