= Taşoluk =

Taşoluk (literally "rock trough" in Turkish) may refer to the following places in Turkey:

- Taşoluk, Bolu, a village in the district of Bolu, Bolu Province
- Taşoluk, Çine, a village in the district of Çine, Aydın Province
- Taşoluk, Kuyucak, a village in the district of Kuyucak, Aydın Province
- Taşoluk, Gülnar, a village in the district of Gülnar, Mersin Province
- Taşoluk, Sinanpaşa, a village in the district of Sinanpaşa, Afyonkarahisar Province

== See also ==
- Taşoluk Dam
