= Dereli (disambiguation) =

Dereli is a town and district of Giresun Province, Turkey.

Dereli (Turkic: "of/with creeks") may also refer to:

== People ==
- Abdurrahman Dereli (born 1981), Turkish footballer
- Emel Dereli (born 1996), Turkish female shot putter
- Selçuk Dereli (born 1969), Turkish football referee
- Tekin Dereli (born 1949), Turkish theoretical physicist

== Places ==
- Dərəli, a village in the Zangilan Rayon of Azerbaijan
- Dereli, Beypazarı, a village in the district of Beypazarı, Ankara Province, Turkey
- Dereli, Çine, a village in the district of Çine, Aydın Province, Turkey
- Dereli, Döşemealtı, a village in the district of Antalya, Antalya Province, Turkey
- Dereli, Gercüş, a village in the district of Gercüş, Batman Province, Turkey
- Dereli, Gölpazarı, a village in the district of Gölpazarı, Bilecik Province, Turkey
- Dereli, Ulus, a village in the district of Ulus, Bartın Province, Turkey
