= Akdam =

Akdam may refer to the following places in Turkey:

- Akdam, Alanya, a village in the district of Alanya, Antalya Province
- Akdam, Ceyhan, a village in the district of Ceyhan, Adana Province
- Akdam, Çine, a village in the district of Çine, Aydın Province
- Akdam, Kozan, a village in the district of Kozan, Adana Province
- Akdam, Yüreğir, a village in the district of Yüreğir, Adana Province
