= Çatak (disambiguation) =

Çatak is a district of Van Province, Turkey.

Çatak may also refer to the following places in Turkey:

- Çatak, Alaca
- Çatak, Alaplı, a village in the Alaplı District of the Zonguldak Province
- Çatak, Altınyayla
- Çatak, Aziziye
- Çatak, Buldan
- Çatak, Çine, a village in Çine district of Aydın Province
- Çatak, Çorum
- Çatak, Gönen, a village
- Çatak, Hınıs
- Çatak, Ilgaz
- Çatak, Nazilli, a village in Nazilli district of Aydın Province
- Çatak, Oltu
- Çatak, Osmancık
- Çatak, Refahiye
- Çatak, Saimbeyli, a village in Saimbeyli district of Adana Province
- Çatak, Silifke, a village in Silifke district of Mersin Province

Çatak Dam is a dam in the Kastamonu Province of Turkey
