= Cumali =

Cumali may refer to:

- Cumalı, Bilecik, Turkey
- Cumalı, Bozkurt, Turkey
- Cumalı, Çine, Turkey
- Cumalı, Gelibolu, Turkey
- Cumalı, İhsaniye, Turkey
- Cumali, Ortaköy, Turkey
- Cumalı, Serik, Turkey

== People ==
- Cumali (Turkish name), list of people with the name
