= Kabataş =

Kabataş may refer to:

- Kabataş, Beyoğlu, a quarter in the European part of Istanbul, Turkey
  - Kabataş (Istanbul Metro), a funicular railway station
- Kabataş, Çine, a village in Aydın Province, Turkey
- Kabataş, Kemaliye, a village in Erzincan Province, Turkey
- Kabataş, Ordu, a town and district of Ordu Province, Turkey
- Kabataş Erkek Lisesi, a historic high school in the Ortaköy neighborhood of Istanbul, Turkey
