= Orta, Karpuzlu =

Village in Turkey

Orta
- Neighbourhood
- Location in Turkey Orta (Turkey Aegean)
- Coordinates: 37°33′27″N 27°49′56″E
- Country: Turkey
- Province: Aydın
- District: Karpuzlu
- Population (2024): 246
- Time zone: UTC+3 (TRT)

Orta is a neighbourhood in the municipality and district of Karpuzlu, Aydın Province, Turkey. Its population is 246 (2024).
