= Kızıldere =

Kızıldere is a Turkish word meaning "red creek" and may refer to:

== Places ==
- Kızıldere, Buharkent, a village in Buharkent district of Aydın Province, Turkey
- Kızıldere, Ceyhan, a village in Ceyhan district of Adana Province, Turkey
- Kızıldere, Kırıkkale, a populated place in Kırıkkale Province, Turkey
- Kızıldere, Nazilli, a village in Nazilli district of Aydın Province, Turkey
- Kızıldere, the former name of Ataköy, Almus in Tokat Province, the village where Mahir Çayan and nine other leftist militants were killed by soldiers on 30 March 1972
- Kızıldere, Mersin is a river in Mersin, turkey

== Other uses ==
- Kızıldere Geothermal Power Plant, at Kızıldere village of Sarayköy district in Denizli Province, Turkey
