= İstiklal, Buharkent =

Village in Turkey

İstiklal
- Neighbourhood
- Location in Turkey İstiklal (Turkey Aegean)
- Coordinates: 37°58′15″N 28°44′19″E
- Country: Turkey
- Province: Aydın
- District: Buharkent
- Population (2024): 2,112
- Time zone: UTC+3 (TRT)

İstiklal is a neighbourhood in the municipality and district of Buharkent, Aydın Province, Turkey. Its population is 2,112 (2024).
