= Hükümet, Yenipazar =

Village in Turkey

Hükümet
- Neighbourhood
- Country: Turkey
- Province: Aydın
- District: Yenipazar
- Population (2024): 2,175
- Time zone: UTC+3 (TRT)

Hükümet is a neighbourhood in the municipality and district of Yenipazar, Aydın Province, Turkey. Its population is 2,175 (2024).
