= Yolboyu =

Yolboyu can refer to:

- Yolboyu, Çine
- Yolboyu, Oltu
