= Zafer, Buharkent =

Village in Turkey

Zafer
- Neighbourhood
- Location in Turkey Zafer (Turkey Aegean)
- Coordinates: 37°57′54″N 28°43′53″E
- Country: Turkey
- Province: Aydın
- District: Buharkent
- Population (2024): 1,340
- Time zone: UTC+3 (TRT)

Zafer is a neighbourhood in the municipality and district of Buharkent, Aydın Province, Turkey. Its population is 1,340 (2024).
