= Sarıköy =

Sarıköy may refer to:

- Sarıköy, Gönen, a village in the District of Gönen, Balıkesir Province, Turkey, site of ancient Zeleia
- Sarıköy, Başmakçı, a village in the District of Başmakçı, Afyonkarahisar Province, Turkey
- Sarıköy, Bismil
- Sarıköy, Çine, a village in the District of Çine, Aydın Province, Turkey
- Sarıköy, Merzifon, a village in the District of Merzifon, Amasya Province, Turkey
