= Ünlüce =

Ünlüce can refer to:

- Ünlüce, Çine
- Ünlüce, Hınıs
- Ünlüce, Tut
- Ünlüce, Yüreğir
