= Tütünlük, Karpuzlu =

Village in Turkey

Tütünlük
- Neighbourhood
- Location in Turkey Tütünlük (Turkey Aegean)
- Coordinates: 37°33′16″N 27°49′44″E
- Country: Turkey
- Province: Aydın
- District: Karpuzlu
- Population (2024): 276
- Time zone: UTC+3 (TRT)

Tütünlük is a neighbourhood in the municipality and district of Karpuzlu, Aydın Province, Turkey. Its population is 276 (2024).
