= Altınova (disambiguation) =

Altınova is a town and district of Yalova Province, Turkey.

Altınova (literally "golden plains" in Turkish) may refer to:

- Altınova, Elazığ, an important archaeological site in the Altınova plain of the Elazığ Province
- Altınova, Ayvalık, a neighbourhood in the district of Ayvalık, Balıkesir Province
- Altınova, Evciler, a village in the district of Evciler, Afyonkarahisar Province
- Altınova, Çine, a village in the district of Çine, Aydın Province
- Altınova, Karaisalı, a village in the district of Karaisalı, Adana Province
- Altınova, Tavas

It may also refer to:

- Altınova, Cyprus, a village in north-eastern Cyprus, better known by its Greek name, Agios Iakovos
