= Kamilpaşa, Buharkent =

Village in Turkey

Kamilpaşa
- Neighbourhood
- Location in Turkey Kamilpaşa (Turkey Aegean)
- Coordinates: 37°57′56″N 28°44′57″E
- Country: Turkey
- Province: Aydın
- District: Buharkent
- Population (2024): 2,059
- Time zone: UTC+3 (TRT)

Kamilpaşa is a neighbourhood in the municipality and district of Buharkent, Aydın Province, Turkey. Its population is 2,059 (2024).
