= Üçeylül, Buharkent =

Village in Turkey

Üçeylül
- Neighbourhood
- Location in Turkey Üçeylül (Turkey Aegean)
- Coordinates: 37°57′47″N 28°44′46″E
- Country: Turkey
- Province: Aydın
- District: Buharkent
- Population (2024): 1,646
- Time zone: UTC+3 (TRT)

Üçeylül is a neighbourhood in the municipality and district of Buharkent, Aydın Province, Turkey. Its population is 1,646 (2024).
