= Yenimahalle, Karpuzlu =

Village in Turkey

Yenimahalle
- Neighbourhood
- Location in Turkey Yenimahalle (Turkey Aegean)
- Coordinates: 37°33′28″N 27°50′08″E
- Country: Turkey
- Province: Aydın
- District: Karpuzlu
- Population (2024): 1,106
- Time zone: UTC+3 (TRT)

Yenimahalle is a neighbourhood in the municipality and district of Karpuzlu, Aydın Province, Turkey. Its population is 1,106 (2024).
