= Dorumlar =

Dorumlar may refer to:

- Dorumlar, Çine, a village in Aydın Province, Turkey
- Dorumlar, Serik, a village in Antalya Province, Turkey
