= Menderes, Buharkent =

Village in Turkey

Menderes
- Neighbourhood
- Location in Turkey Menderes (Turkey Aegean)
- Coordinates: 37°57′32″N 28°44′29″E
- Country: Turkey
- Province: Aydın
- District: Buharkent
- Population (2024): 514
- Time zone: UTC+3 (TRT)

Menderes is a neighbourhood in the municipality and district of Buharkent, Aydın Province, Turkey. Its population is 514 (2024).
