= Kayaburnu, Buharkent =

Village in Turkey

Kayaburnu
- Neighbourhood
- Location in Turkey Kayaburnu (Turkey Aegean)
- Coordinates: 37°59′1″N 28°44′48″E
- Country: Turkey
- Province: Aydın
- District: Buharkent
- Population (2024): 397
- Time zone: UTC+3 (TRT)

Kayaburnu is a neighbourhood in the municipality and district of Buharkent, Aydın Province, Turkey. Its population is 397 (2024).
