= Yörükler =

Yörükler may refer to:

- Yörükler, 19 Mayıs, a neighbourhood in Samsun Province, Turkey
- Yörükler, Çine, a neighbourhood in Aydın Province, Turkey
- Yörükler, Geyve, a neighbourhood in Sakarya Province, Turkey
