= Umurköy =

Umurköy can refer to:

- Umurköy, Çine
- Umurköy, Silvan
