= Sarnıç =

Sarnıç or Sarnıçköy may refer to:

- Sarnıç, Biga, a village in Çanakkale Province, Turkey
- Sarnıç, Çine, a neighbourhood in Aydın Province, Turkey
- Sarnıç, Pazaryeri, a village in Bilecik Province, Turkey
- Sarnıç, Ulus, a village in Bartın Province, Turkey
- Sarnıç railway station, on the İZBAN commuter system in Gaziemir, Izmir Province, Turkey
