= Çine Dam =

Coordinates: 37.4947°N 28.1297°E

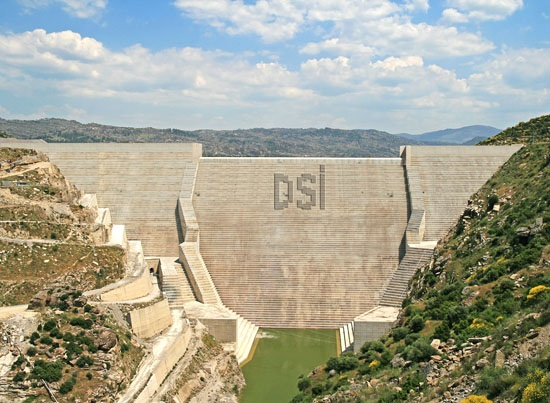
- The initials DSİ are for Devlet Su İşleri, State Hydraulic Works
- Location: Turkey
- Construction began: 1995
- Opening date: 2013

Dam and spillways
- Impounds: Çine River
- Height (foundation): 136.5 m (448 ft)
- Length: 362 m (1,188 ft)

Reservoir
- Creates: Cine Reservoir
- Total capacity: 160 cubic hectometers

Power Station
- Installed capacity: 47.2 MW
- Annual generation: 118 GWh

Çine Dam is a dam in Aydın province in western Turkey, about 15 km (9 mi) SSE of the town of Çine. The development was backed by the Turkish State Hydraulic Works. It is the first major roller compacted concrete dam in Turkey. At its height of 136.5 m, Çine Dam is one of the highest dams in the world.

== See also ==
- List of dams and reservoirs in Turkey
