= Saraçlar =

Saraçlar can refer to:

- Saraçlar, Çine
- Saraçlar, Kargı
