= Söğütçük =

Söğütçük can refer to the following villages in Turkey:

- Söğütçük, Çine
- Söğütcük, Gölpazarı
- Söğütcük, Ilgaz
- Söğütcük, Korkuteli
- Söğütçük, Savaştepe
