= Sağlık =

Sağlık (literally "health") is a Turkish word and may refer to:

- Sağlık, Aksaray, a town in Aksaray Province, Turkey
- Sağlık, Çine, a village in Aydın Province, Turkey
- Sağlık, Meram, a town in Konya Province, Turkey
- Sağlık, Refahiye
- Sağlık, Silvan

== People with the surname ==
- Enes Sağlık (born 1991), Belgian-Turkish footballer
- Erkan Sağlık (born 1985), Turkish footballer
- Mahir Sağlık (born 1983), Turkish footballer

== Other ==
- Ellerine Sağlık, the debut album by Yalın, released in 2004
