= Bayraktepe, Karpuzlu =

Village in Turkey

Bayraktepe
- Neighbourhood
- Location in Turkey Bayraktepe (Turkey Aegean)
- Coordinates: 37°33′52″N 27°50′18″E
- Country: Turkey
- Province: Aydın
- District: Karpuzlu
- Population (2024): 425
- Time zone: UTC+3 (TRT)

Bayraktepe is a neighbourhood in the municipality and district of Karpuzlu, Aydın Province, Turkey. Its population is 425 (2024).
