= Bağlarbaşı =

Bağlarbaşı (literally "head of the gardens") is a Turkish place name that may refer to the following places in Turkey:

- Bağlarbaşı, Gölbaşı, a village in the district of Gölbaşı, Adıyaman Province
- Bağlarbaşı, Çine, a village in the district of Çine, Aydın Province
- Bağlarbaşı, Üsküdar, a neighborhood of Üsküdar, Istanbul
- Bağlarbaşı, Arnas, a village in the district of Midyat, Mardin Province
  - Bağlarbaşı (Istanbul Metro), a railway station
