= Koğuk =

Koğuk can refer to:

- Koğuk, Bismil
- Koğuk, Karpuzlu
