= Doğu, Yenipazar =

Village in Turkey

Doğu
- Neighbourhood
- Location in Turkey Doğu (Turkey Aegean)
- Coordinates: 37°49′19″N 28°12′04″E
- Country: Turkey
- Province: Aydın
- District: Yenipazar
- Population (2024): 1,119
- Time zone: UTC+3 (TRT)

Doğu is a neighbourhood in the municipality and district of Yenipazar, Aydın Province, Turkey. Its population is 1,119 (2024).
