= İbrahimkavağı, Çine =

İbrahimkavağı
- Neighbourhood
- Location in Turkey İbrahimkavağı (Turkey Aegean)
- Coordinates: 37°41′N 28°11′E
- Country: Turkey
- Province: Aydın
- District: Çine
- Population (2022): 449
- Time zone: UTC+3 (TRT)

İbrahimkavağı is a neighbourhood in the municipality and district of Çine, Aydın Province, Turkey. Its population is 449 (2022).
