= Güneyköy, Karpuzlu =

Güneyköy
- Neighbourhood
- Location in Turkey Güneyköy (Turkey Aegean)
- Coordinates: 37°33′47″N 27°54′54″E
- Country: Turkey
- Province: Aydın
- District: Karpuzlu
- Population (2022): 194
- Time zone: UTC+3 (TRT)

Güneyköy (also: Güney) is a neighbourhood in the municipality and district of Karpuzlu, Aydın Province, Turkey. Its population is 194 (2022).
