= Bedirler, Çine =

Bedirler
- Neighbourhood
- Location in Turkey Bedirler (Turkey Aegean)
- Coordinates: 37.7091°N 27.8689°E
- Country: Turkey
- Province: Aydın
- District: Çine
- Population (2022): 148
- Time zone: UTC+3 (TRT)

Bedirler is a neighbourhood in the municipality and district of Çine, Aydın Province, Turkey. Its population is 148 (2022).
