= Çulhan, Yenipazar =

Çulhan
- Neighbourhood
- Location in Turkey Çulhan (Turkey Aegean)
- Coordinates: 37°48′25″N 28°09′29″E
- Country: Turkey
- Province: Aydın
- District: Yenipazar
- Population (2022): 180
- Time zone: UTC+3 (TRT)

Çulhan is a neighbourhood in the municipality and district of Yenipazar, Aydın Province, Turkey. Its population is 180 (2022).
