= Ericek, Buharkent =

Ericek
- Neighbourhood
- Country: Turkey
- Province: Aydın
- District: Buharkent
- Population (2022): 226
- Time zone: UTC+3 (TRT)

Ericek is a neighbourhood in the municipality and district of Buharkent, Aydın Province, Turkey. Its population is 226 (2022).
