= Ortakçı, Buharkent =

Ortakçı
- Neighbourhood
- Location in Turkey Ortakçı (Turkey Aegean)
- Coordinates: 37°58′23″N 28°43′16″E
- Country: Turkey
- Province: Aydın
- District: Buharkent
- Population (2022): 1,096
- Time zone: UTC+3 (TRT)

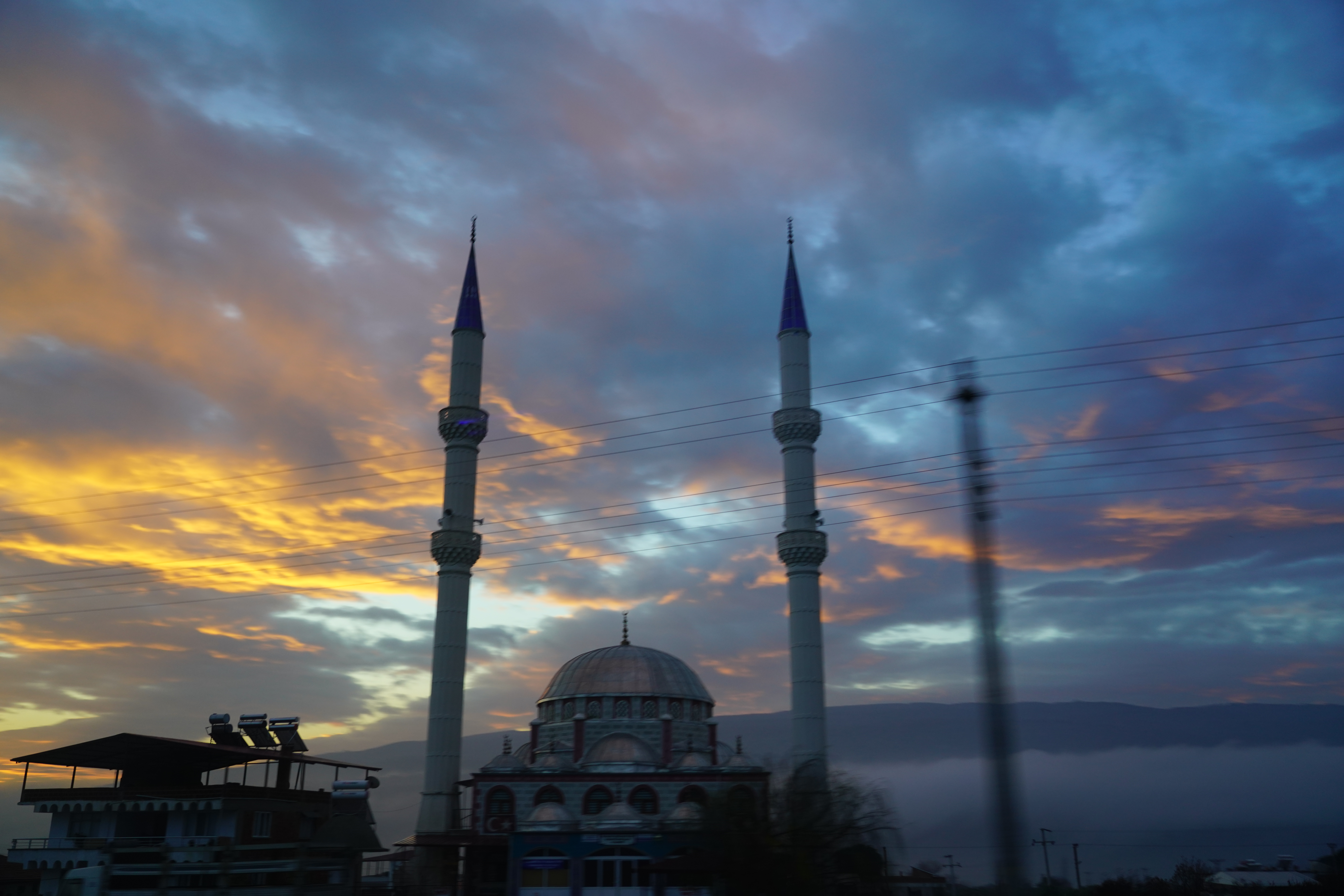
Kadı Hüseyin Ergünhan Mosque, Ortakçı, Buharkent

Ortakçı is a neighbourhood in the municipality and district of Buharkent, Aydın Province, Turkey. Its population is 1,096 (2022).
