= Karaçakal, Yenipazar =

Karaçakal
- Neighbourhood
- Location in Turkey Karaçakal (Turkey Aegean)
- Coordinates: 37°48′N 28°13′E
- Country: Turkey
- Province: Aydın
- District: Yenipazar
- Population (2022): 126
- Time zone: UTC+3 (TRT)

Karaçakal is a neighbourhood in the municipality and district of Yenipazar, Aydın Province, Turkey. Its population is 126 (2022).
