= Ovapınarı, Karpuzlu =

Ovapınarı
- Neighbourhood
- Location in Turkey Ovapınarı (Turkey Aegean)
- Coordinates: 37°31′N 27°51′E
- Country: Turkey
- Province: Aydın
- District: Karpuzlu
- Population (2022): 481
- Time zone: UTC+3 (TRT)

Ovapınarı is a neighbourhood in the municipality and district of Karpuzlu, Aydın Province, Turkey. Its population is 481 (2022).
