= Hallaçlar, Çine =

Hallaçlar
- Neighbourhood
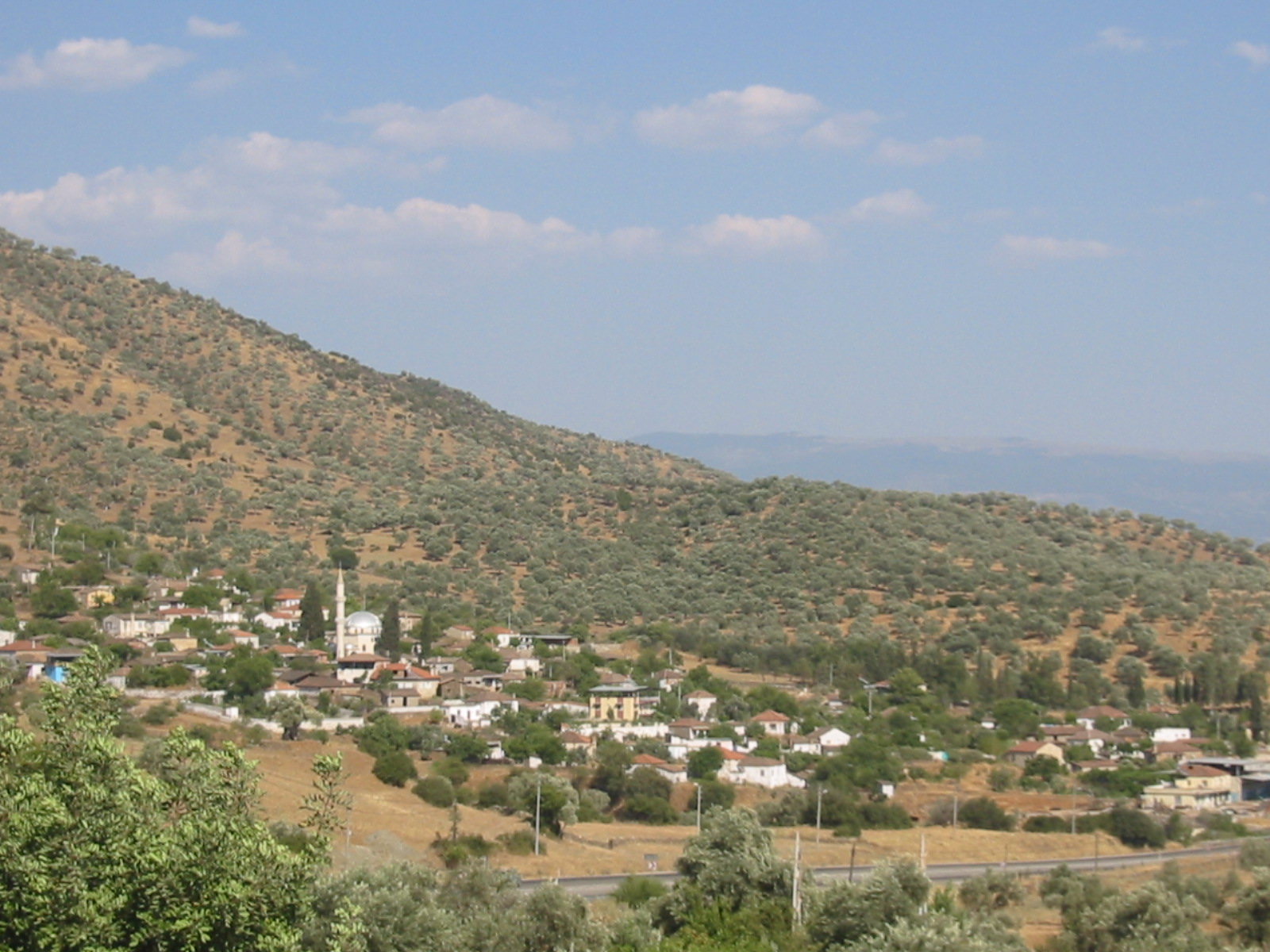

- Location within Turkey Location within Turkey Aegean
- Coordinates: 37°42′47″N 27°56′13″E
- Country: Turkey
- Province: Aydın
- District: Çine
- Population (2022): 269
- Time zone: UTC+3 (TRT)

Hallaçlar is a neighbourhood in the municipality and district of Çine, Aydın Province, Turkey. Its population is 269 (2022).
