= Yahşiler, Karpuzlu =

Yahşiler
- Neighbourhood
- Location in Turkey Yahşiler (Turkey Aegean)
- Coordinates: 37°32′38″N 27°46′01″E
- Country: Turkey
- Province: Aydın
- District: Karpuzlu
- Population (2022): 476
- Time zone: UTC+3 (TRT)

Yahşiler (also: Yağşılar) is a neighbourhood in the municipality and district of Karpuzlu, Aydın Province, Turkey. Its population is 476 (2022).
