= Kasar, Çine =

Kasar
- Neighbourhood
- Location in Turkey Kasar (Turkey Aegean)
- Coordinates: 37.7264°N 28.0047°E
- Country: Turkey
- Province: Aydın
- District: Çine
- Population (2022): 264
- Time zone: UTC+3 (TRT)

Kasar is a neighbourhood in the municipality and district of Çine, Aydın Province, Turkey. Its population is 264 (2022).
