= Muratdağı, Buharkent =

Muratdağı
- Neighbourhood
- Location in Turkey Muratdağı (Turkey Aegean)
- Coordinates: 38°01′55″N 28°44′6″E
- Country: Turkey
- Province: Aydın
- District: Buharkent
- Population (2022): 50
- Time zone: UTC+3 (TRT)

Muratdağı is a neighbourhood in the municipality and district of Buharkent, Aydın Province, Turkey. Its population is 50 (2022).
