= Akçaabat, Karpuzlu =

Akçaabat
- Neighbourhood
- Location in Turkey Akçaabat (Turkey Aegean)
- Coordinates: 37°37′05″N 27°47′16″E
- Country: Turkey
- Province: Aydın
- District: Karpuzlu
- Population (2022): 417
- Time zone: UTC+3 (TRT)

Akçaabat is a neighbourhood in the municipality and district of Karpuzlu, Aydın Province, Turkey. Its population is 417 (2022).
