= Karanfiller, Çine =

Karanfiller
- Neighbourhood
- Location in Turkey Karanfiller (Turkey Aegean)
- Coordinates: 37°44′N 28°00′E
- Country: Turkey
- Province: Aydın
- District: Çine
- Population (2022): 66
- Time zone: UTC+3 (TRT)

Karanfiller is a neighbourhood in the municipality and district of Çine, Aydın Province, Turkey. Its population is 66 (2022).
