= Kırksakallar, Çine =

Kırksakallar
- Neighbourhood
- Location in Turkey Kırksakallar (Turkey Aegean)
- Coordinates: 37°32′N 28°08′E
- Country: Turkey
- Province: Aydın
- District: Çine
- Population (2022): 264
- Time zone: UTC+3 (TRT)

Kırksakallar is a neighbourhood in the municipality and district of Çine, Aydın Province, Turkey. Its population is 264 (2022).
