= Direcik, Yenipazar =

Direcik
- Neighbourhood
- Location in Turkey Direcik (Turkey Aegean)
- Coordinates: 37°50′10″N 28°16′41″E
- Country: Turkey
- Province: Aydın
- District: Yenipazar
- Population (2022): 336
- Time zone: UTC+3 (TRT)

Direcik is a neighbourhood in the municipality and district of Yenipazar, Aydın Province, Turkey. Its population is 336 (2022).
