= Cumalar, Karpuzlu =

Cumalar
- Neighbourhood
- Location in Turkey Cumalar (Turkey Aegean)
- Coordinates: 37°34′5″N 27°46′55″E
- Country: Turkey
- Province: Aydın
- District: Karpuzlu
- Population (2022): 163
- Time zone: UTC+3 (TRT)

Cumalar is a neighbourhood in the municipality and district of Karpuzlu, Aydın Province, Turkey. Its population is 163 (2022).
