= Tatarmemişler, Çine =

Tatarmemişler
- Neighbourhood
- Location in Turkey Tatarmemişler (Turkey Aegean)
- Coordinates: 37°36′N 28°06′E
- Country: Turkey
- Province: Aydın
- District: Çine
- Population (2022): 277
- Time zone: UTC+3 (TRT)

Tatarmemişler is a neighbourhood in the municipality and district of Çine, Aydın Province, Turkey. Its population is 277 (2022).
