= Bahçearası, Çine =

Bahçearası
- Neighbourhood
- Location in Turkey Bahçearası (Turkey Aegean)
- Coordinates: 37°42′N 27°54′E
- Country: Turkey
- Province: Aydın
- District: Çine
- Population (2022): 476
- Time zone: UTC+3 (TRT)

Bahçearası is a neighbourhood in the municipality and district of Çine, Aydın Province, Turkey. Its population is 476 (2022).
