= Elderesi, Çine =

Elderesi
- Neighbourhood
- Location in Turkey Elderesi (Turkey Aegean)
- Coordinates: 37°42′N 28°08′E
- Country: Turkey
- Province: Aydın
- District: Çine
- Population (2022): 349
- Time zone: UTC+3 (TRT)

Elderesi is a neighbourhood in the municipality and district of Çine, Aydın Province, Turkey. Its population is 349 (2022).
