= Camızağılı, Çine =

Camızağılı
- Neighbourhood
- Location in Turkey Camızağılı (Turkey Aegean)
- Coordinates: 37°33′18″N 28°00′43″E
- Country: Turkey
- Province: Aydın
- District: Çine
- Population (2022): 443
- Time zone: UTC+3 (TRT)

Camızağılı is a neighbourhood in the municipality and district of Çine, Aydın Province, Turkey. Its population is 443 (2022).
