= Kabalar, Çine =

Kabalar
- Neighbourhood
- Location in Turkey Kabalar (Turkey Aegean)
- Coordinates: 37.490014°N 28.078635°E
- Country: Turkey
- Province: Aydın
- District: Çine
- Population (2022): 230
- Time zone: UTC+3 (TRT)

Kabalar is a neighbourhood in the municipality and district of Çine, Aydın Province, Turkey. Its population is 230 (2022).
