= Feslek, Buharkent =

Feslek
- Neighbourhood
- Location in Turkey Feslek (Turkey Aegean)
- Coordinates: 37°57′29″N 28°41′2″E
- Country: Turkey
- Province: Aydın
- District: Buharkent
- Population (2022): 895
- Time zone: UTC+3 (TRT)

Feslek is a neighbourhood of the municipality and district of Buharkent, Aydın Province, Turkey. Its population is 895 (2022).
