= Ulukonak, Karpuzlu =

Ulukonak
- Neighbourhood
- Location in Turkey Ulukonak (Turkey Aegean)
- Coordinates: 37.6000°N 27.8333°E
- Country: Turkey
- Province: Aydın
- District: Karpuzlu
- Population (2022): 606
- Time zone: UTC+3 (TRT)

Ulukonak is a neighbourhood in the municipality and district of Karpuzlu, Aydın Province, Turkey. Its population is 606 (2022).
