= Kargı, Çine =

Kargı
- Neighbourhood
- Location in Turkey Kargı (Turkey Aegean)
- Coordinates: 37°33′36″N 27°59′56″E
- Country: Turkey
- Province: Aydın
- District: Çine
- Population (2022): 306
- Time zone: UTC+3 (TRT)

Kargı is a neighbourhood in the municipality and district of Çine, Aydın Province, Turkey. Its population is 306 (2022).
