= Gökyaka, Çine =

Gökyaka
- Neighbourhood
- Location in Turkey Gökyaka (Turkey Aegean)
- Coordinates: 37.6333°N 27.9333°E
- Country: Turkey
- Province: Aydın
- District: Çine
- Population (2022): 559
- Time zone: UTC+3 (TRT)

Gökyaka is a neighbourhood in the municipality and district of Çine, Aydın Province, Turkey. Its population is 559 (2022).
