= Çaltı, Çine =

Çaltı
- Neighbourhood
- Location in Turkey Çaltı (Turkey Aegean)
- Coordinates: 37.6500°N 28.0333°E
- Country: Turkey
- Province: Aydın
- District: Çine
- Population (2022): 931
- Time zone: UTC+3 (TRT)

Çaltı is a neighbourhood in the municipality and district of Çine, Aydın Province, Turkey. Its population is 931 (2022).
