= Umcular, Karpuzlu =

Umcular
- Neighbourhood
- Location in Turkey Umcular (Turkey Aegean)
- Coordinates: 37°34′N 27°46′E
- Country: Turkey
- Province: Aydın
- District: Karpuzlu
- Population (2022): 296
- Time zone: UTC+3 (TRT)

Umcular is a neighbourhood in the municipality and district of Karpuzlu, Aydın Province, Turkey. Its population is 296 (2022).
