= Kırkışık, Çine =

Kırkışık
- Neighbourhood
- Location in Turkey Kırkışık (Turkey Aegean)
- Coordinates: 37°40′N 28°04′E
- Country: Turkey
- Province: Aydın
- District: Çine
- Population (2022): 171
- Time zone: UTC+3 (TRT)

Kırkışık is a neighbourhood in the municipality and district of Çine, Aydın Province, Turkey. Its population is 171 (2022).
