= Hatıpkışla, Karpuzlu =

Hatıpkışla
- Neighbourhood
- Location in Turkey Hatıpkışla (Turkey Aegean)
- Coordinates: 37°31′N 27°50′E
- Country: Turkey
- Province: Aydın
- District: Karpuzlu
- Population (2022): 558
- Time zone: UTC+3 (TRT)

Hatıpkışla is a neighbourhood in the municipality and district of Karpuzlu, Aydın Province, Turkey. Its population is 558 (2022).
