= Akçaova =

- Neighbourhood
- Location in Turkey Akçaova (Turkey Aegean)
- Coordinates: 37°30′22″N 28°01′41″E
- Country: Turkey
- Province: Aydın
- District: Çine
- Elevation: 230 m (750 ft)
- Population (2022): 2,105
- Time zone: UTC+3 (TRT)
- Postal code: 09520
- Area code: 0256

Akçaova (literally "white plains") is a neighbourhood of the municipality and district of Çine, Aydın Province, Turkey. Its population is 2,105 (2022). Before the 2013 reorganisation, it was a town (belde). It is situated in the plains to the south west of Çine Creek a tributary of Büyükmenderes River. The distance to Çine is 16 kilometres (9.9 mi) and to Aydın is 52 kilometres (32 mi). The earlier name of the settlement was Akçaoba ("white tribe") referring to the nomadic Turkmen founders of the settlement in 1820s. In 1969, the settlement was declared a seat of township. Main economic activity is olive groves and cattle breeding. There is an integrated meat plant in the town.
