= Abak, Karpuzlu =

Abak
- Neighbourhood
- Location in Turkey Abak (Turkey Aegean)
- Coordinates: 37°37′N 27°52′E
- Country: Turkey
- Province: Aydın
- District: Karpuzlu
- Population (2022): 432
- Time zone: UTC+3 (TRT)

Abak is a neighbourhood in the municipality and district of Karpuzlu, Aydın Province, Turkey. Its population is 432 (2022).
