= Yağcılar, Çine =

Yağcılar
- Neighbourhood
- Location in Turkey Yağcılar (Turkey Aegean)
- Coordinates: 37.5656°N 28.0606°E
- Country: Turkey
- Province: Aydın
- District: Çine
- Population (2022): 279
- Time zone: UTC+3 (TRT)

Yağcılar is a neighbourhood in the municipality and district of Çine, Aydın Province, Turkey. Its population is 279 (2022).
