= Kahraman, Çine =

Kahraman
- Neighbourhood
- Location in Turkey Kahraman (Turkey Aegean)
- Coordinates: 37.6000°N 28.0333°E
- Country: Turkey
- Province: Aydın
- District: Çine
- Population (2022): 1,003
- Time zone: UTC+3 (TRT)

Kahraman is a neighbourhood in the municipality and district of Çine, Aydın Province, Turkey. Its population is 1,003 (2022).
