= Eskiçine, Çine =

Eskiçine
- Neighbourhood
- Location in Turkey Eskiçine (Turkey Aegean)
- Coordinates: 37°32′13″N 28°04′015″E
- Country: Turkey
- Province: Aydın
- District: Çine
- Population (2022): 612
- Time zone: UTC+3 (TRT)

Eskiçine is a neighbourhood in the municipality and district of Çine, Aydın Province, Turkey. Its population is 612 (2022).
