= Karacaören, Yenipazar =

Karacaören
- Neighbourhood
- Location in Turkey Karacaören (Turkey Aegean)
- Coordinates: 37.7339°N 28.1667°E
- Country: Turkey
- Province: Aydın
- District: Yenipazar
- Population (2022): 588
- Time zone: UTC+3 (TRT)

Karacaören is a neighbourhood in the municipality and district of Yenipazar, Aydın Province, Turkey. Its population is 588 (2022).
