= Ovacık, Çine =

Ovacık
- Neighbourhood
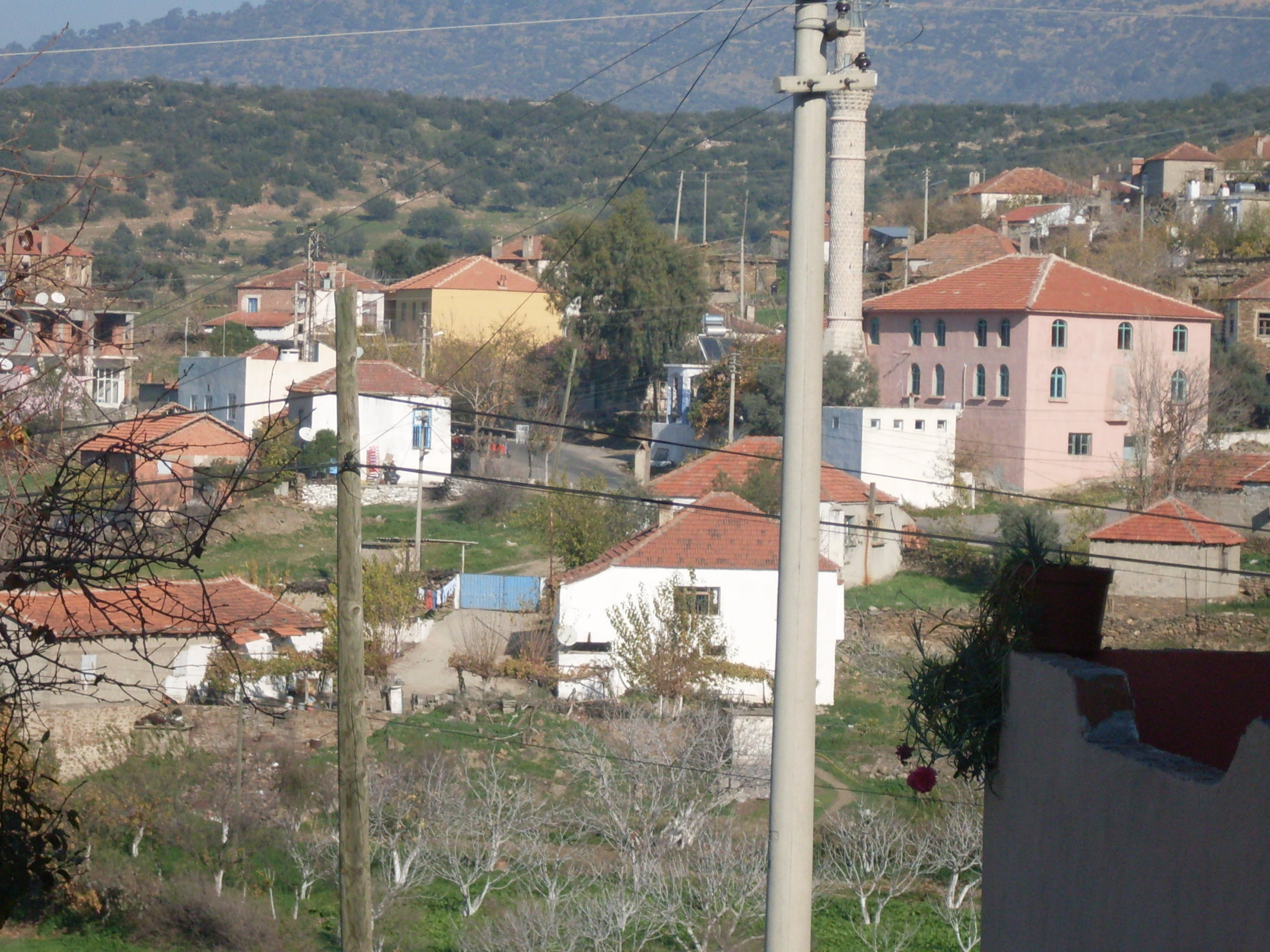

- Location within Turkey Location within Turkey Aegean
- Coordinates: 37.5333°N 28.1000°E
- Country: Turkey
- Province: Aydın
- District: Çine
- Population (2022): 519
- Time zone: UTC+3 (TRT)

Ovacık is a neighbourhood in the municipality and district of Çine, Aydın Province, Turkey. Its population is 519 (2022).
