= Kavşıt, Çine =

Kavşıt
- Neighbourhood
- Location in Turkey Kavşıt (Turkey Aegean)
- Coordinates: 37.6500°N 28.1333°E
- Country: Turkey
- Province: Aydın
- District: Çine
- Population (2022): 503
- Time zone: UTC+3 (TRT)

Kavşıt is a neighbourhood in the municipality and district of Çine, Aydın Province, Turkey. Its population is 503 (2022).
