= Topçam, Çine =

Topçam
- Neighbourhood
- Country: Turkey
- Province: Aydın
- District: Çine
- Population (2022): 704
- Time zone: UTC+3 (TRT)

Topçam is a neighbourhood in the municipality and district of Çine, Aydın Province, Turkey. Its population is 704 (2022).
