= Evciler, Çine =

Evciler
- Neighbourhood
- Location in Turkey Evciler (Turkey Aegean)
- Coordinates: 37°35′53″N 28°03′43″E
- Country: Turkey
- Province: Aydın
- District: Çine
- Population (2022): 2,468
- Time zone: UTC+3 (TRT)

Evciler is a neighbourhood in the municipality and district of Çine, Aydın Province, Turkey. Its population is 2,468 (2022).
