= Mutaflar, Çine =

Mutaflar
- Neighbourhood
- Location in Turkey Mutaflar (Turkey Aegean)
- Coordinates: 37°36′40″N 28°05′20″E
- Country: Turkey
- Province: Aydın
- District: Çine
- Population (2022): 1,224
- Time zone: UTC+3 (TRT)

Mutaflar is a neighbourhood in the municipality and district of Çine, Aydın Province, Turkey. Its population is 1,224 (2022).
