= Karahayıt, Çine =

Karahayıt
- Neighbourhood
- Country: Turkey
- Province: Aydın
- District: Çine
- Population (2022): 245
- Time zone: UTC+3 (TRT)

Karahayıt is a neighbourhood in the municipality and district of Çine, Aydın Province, Turkey. Its population is 245 (2022).
