= Mutluca, Karpuzlu =

Mutluca
- Neighbourhood
- Country: Turkey
- Province: Aydın
- District: Karpuzlu
- Population (2022): 94
- Time zone: UTC+3 (TRT)

Mutluca is a neighbourhood in the municipality and district of Karpuzlu, Aydın Province, Turkey. Its population is 94 (2022).
