= Hasanlar, Çine =

Hasanlar
- Neighbourhood
- Country: Turkey
- Province: Aydın
- District: Çine
- Population (2022): 80
- Time zone: UTC+3 (TRT)

Hasanlar is a neighbourhood in the municipality and district of Çine, Aydın Province, Turkey. Its population is 80 (2022).
