= Savcıllı, Buharkent =

Savcıllı
- Neighbourhood
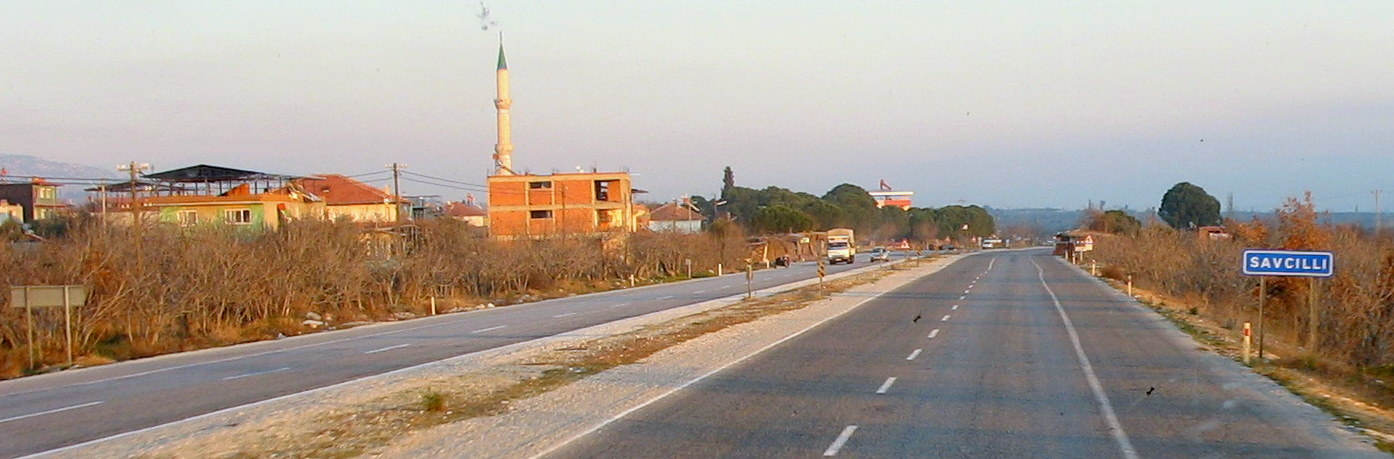

- Location within Turkey Location within Turkey Aegean
- Coordinates: 37°57′N 28°46′E
- Country: Turkey
- Province: Aydın
- District: Buharkent
- Population (2022): 1,804
- Time zone: UTC+3 (TRT)

Savcıllı is a neighbourhood in the municipality and district of Buharkent, Aydın Province, Turkey. Its population is 1,804 (2022).
