= Hacıköseler, Yenipazar =

Hacıköseler
- Neighbourhood
- Location in Turkey Hacıköseler (Turkey Aegean)
- Coordinates: 37°41′N 28°08′E
- Country: Turkey
- Province: Aydın
- District: Yenipazar
- Population (2022): 377
- Time zone: UTC+3 (TRT)

Hacıköseler is a neighbourhood in the municipality and district of Yenipazar, Aydın Province, Turkey. Its population is 377 (2022).
