= Hamzabalı, Yenipazar =

Hamzabalı
- Neighbourhood
- Location in Turkey Hamzabalı (Turkey Aegean)
- Coordinates: 37°48′07″N 28°07′16″E
- Country: Turkey
- Province: Aydın
- District: Yenipazar
- Population (2022): 782
- Time zone: UTC+3 (TRT)

Hamzabalı is a neighbourhood in the municipality and district of Yenipazar, Aydın Province, Turkey. Its population is 782 (2022).
