= Dereköy, Yenipazar, Aydın =

Dereköy
- Neighbourhood
- Location in Turkey Dereköy (Turkey Aegean)
- Coordinates: 37°48′22″N 28°08′56″E
- Country: Turkey
- Province: Aydın
- District: Yenipazar
- Population (2022): 404
- Time zone: UTC+3 (TRT)

Dereköy is a neighbourhood in the municipality and district of Yenipazar, Aydın Province, Turkey. Its population is 404 (2022).
