= Meriçler, Karpuzlu =

Meriçler
- Neighbourhood
- Location in Turkey Meriçler (Turkey Aegean)
- Coordinates: 37.5583°N 27.7192°E
- Country: Turkey
- Province: Aydın
- District: Karpuzlu
- Population (2022): 302
- Time zone: UTC+3 (TRT)

Meriçler is a neighbourhood in the municipality and district of Karpuzlu, Aydın Province, Turkey. Its population is 302 (2022).
