= Karpuzlu =

- District and municipality
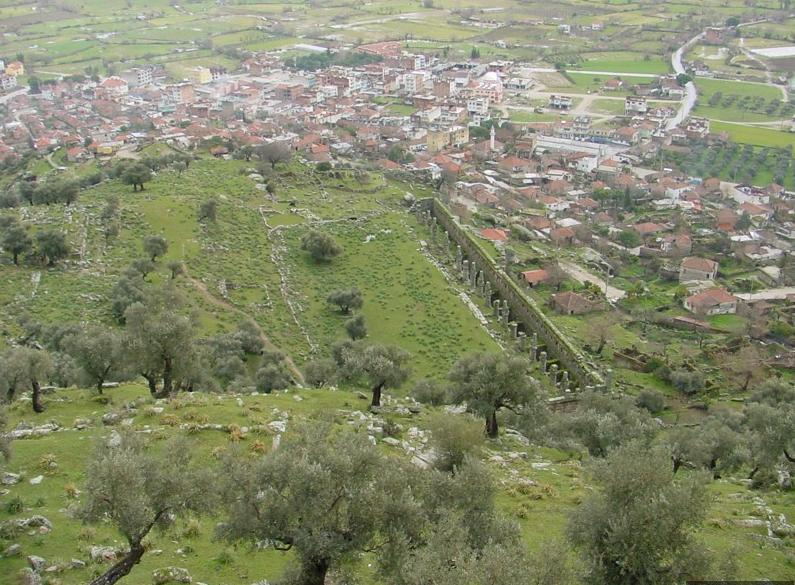

- Map showing Karpuzlu District in Aydın Province

- Location within Turkey Location within Turkey Aegean
- Coordinates: 37°33′33″N 27°50′04″E
- Country: Turkey
- Province: Aydın

Government
  - Mayor: Hilmi Dönmez (MHP)
- Area: 286 km^{2} (110 sq mi)
- Population (2022): 10,590
  - Density: 37.0/km^{2} (95.9/sq mi)
- Time zone: UTC+3 (TRT)
- Postal code: 09540
- Area code: 0256
- Website: www.karpuzlu.bel.tr

Karpuzlu (Turkish: [kaɾˈpuzɫu]) is a municipality and district of Aydın Province, Turkey. Its area is 286 km^{2}, and its population is 10,590 (2022). It is 56 km (35 mi) from the city of Aydın. It became a district centre after separation from Çine in 1990.

Karpuzlu is reached by turning off the road from Aydın to Çine. There is infrequent public transport (by minibus) from both towns to Karpuzlu, which can also be reached by the mountain road from Bodrum or Milas. This latter route is popular with tourists on "jeep safaris" coming to see the ruins of Alinda.

The town is partially situated on the slopes of a hill on the top of which can be seen the well-preserved ruins of the ancient acropolis of Alinda.

The modern district of Karpuzlu covers part of the Çine plain that is part of the southern reaches of the fertile Menderes River (Maeander) valley. The main crops are cotton, corn and many other grains and vegetables.

Karpuzlu (former Demircidere) itself is a very small town of 2,300 people.

== Composition ==
There are 23 neighbourhoods in Karpuzlu District:

- Abak
- Akçaabat
- Bayraktepe
- Çobanisa
- Cumalar
- Ektirli
- Gölcük
- Güneyköy
- Hatıpkışla
- Işıklar
- Kovuk
- Meriçler
- Mutluca
- Ömerler
- Orta
- Ovapınarı
- Şenköy
- Tekeler
- Tütünlük
- Ulukonak
- Umcular
- Yahşiler
- Yenimahalle

== See also ==
- Alinda
- Gülkız Ürbül
