= Tekeler, Karpuzlu =

Tekeler
- Neighbourhood
- Location in Turkey Tekeler (Turkey Aegean)
- Coordinates: 37°32′22″N 27°47′08″E
- Country: Turkey
- Province: Aydın
- District: Karpuzlu
- Population (2022): 1,899
- Time zone: UTC+3 (TRT)

Tekeler is a neighbourhood in the municipality and district of Karpuzlu, Aydın Province, Turkey. Its population is 1,899 (2022).
