= Ömerler, Karpuzlu =

Ömerler
- Neighbourhood
- Country: Turkey
- Province: Aydın
- District: Karpuzlu
- Population (2022): 381
- Time zone: UTC+3 (TRT)

Ömerler is a neighbourhood in the municipality and district of Karpuzlu, Aydın Province, Turkey. Its population is 381 (2022).
