= Tepeköy, Çine =

Tepeköy
- Neighbourhood
- Country: Turkey
- Province: Aydın
- District: Çine
- Population (2022): 134
- Time zone: UTC+3 (TRT)

Tepeköy is a neighbourhood in the municipality and district of Çine, Aydın Province, Turkey. Its population is 134 (2022).
