= Gölcük, Karpuzlu =

Gölcük
- Neighbourhood
- Location in Turkey Gölcük (Turkey Aegean)
- Coordinates: 37.5833°N 27.8333°E
- Country: Turkey
- Province: Aydın
- District: Karpuzlu
- Population (2022): 606
- Time zone: UTC+3 (TRT)

Gölcük is a neighbourhood in the municipality and district of Karpuzlu, Aydın Province, Turkey. Its population is 606 (2022).
