= Ektirli, Karpuzlu =

Neighborhood in Aydın, Turkey

Ektirli
- Neighbourhood
- Location in Turkey Ektirli (Turkey Aegean)
- Coordinates: 37°36′22″N 27°50′35″E
- Country: Turkey
- Province: Aydın
- District: Karpuzlu
- Population (2022): 345
- Time zone: UTC+3 (TRT)

Ektirli is a neighborhood in the municipality and district of Karpuzlu, Aydın Province, Turkey. In 2022, the population was 345.
