= Yeniköy, Çine =

Yeniköy
- Neighbourhood
- Country: Turkey
- Province: Aydın
- District: Çine
- Population (2022): 503
- Time zone: UTC+3 (TRT)

Yeniköy is a neighbourhood in the municipality and district of Çine, Aydın Province, Turkey. Its population is 503 (2022). The village is inhabited by Tahtacı.
