= Soğukoluk, Çine =

Soğukoluk
- Neighbourhood
- Location in Turkey Soğukoluk (Turkey Aegean)
- Coordinates: 37.5167°N 27.9167°E
- Country: Turkey
- Province: Aydın
- District: Çine
- Population (2022): 449
- Time zone: UTC+3 (TRT)

Soğukoluk is a neighbourhood in the municipality and district of Çine, Aydın Province, Turkey. Its population is 449 (2022). The village is inhabited by Tahtacı.
