= Bölüntü, Çine =

Bölüntü
- Neighbourhood
- Location in Turkey Bölüntü (Turkey Aegean)
- Coordinates: 37°33′N 27°56′E
- Country: Turkey
- Province: Aydın
- District: Çine
- Population (2022): 223
- Time zone: UTC+3 (TRT)

Bölüntü is a neighbourhood in the municipality and district of Çine, Aydın Province, Turkey. Its population is 223 (2022).
