= Alhan, Yenipazar =

Alhan
- Neighbourhood
- Location in Turkey Alhan (Turkey Aegean)
- Coordinates: 37°48′36″N 28°09′58″E
- Country: Turkey
- Province: Aydın
- District: Yenipazar
- Population (2022): 109
- Time zone: UTC+3 (TRT)

Alhan is a neighbourhood in the municipality and district of Yenipazar, Aydın Province, Turkey. Its population is 109 (2022).
