= Alioğullar, Yenipazar =

Alioğullar
- Neighbourhood
- Location in Turkey Alioğullar (Turkey Aegean)
- Coordinates: 37°45′32″N 28°14′46″E
- Country: Turkey
- Province: Aydın
- District: Yenipazar
- Population (2022): 246
- Time zone: UTC+3 (TRT)

Alioğullar is a neighbourhood in the municipality and district of Yenipazar, Aydın Province, Turkey. Its population is 246 (2022).
