= Hacıpaşalar, Çine =

Hacıpaşalar
- Neighbourhood
- Location in Turkey Hacıpaşalar (Turkey Aegean)
- Coordinates: 37°30′N 28°13′E
- Country: Turkey
- Province: Aydın
- District: Çine
- Population (2022): 310
- Time zone: UTC+3 (TRT)

Hacıpaşalar is a neighbourhood in the municipality and district of Çine, Aydın Province, Turkey. Its population is 310 (2022).
