= Donduran, Yenipazar =

Donduran
- Neighbourhood
- Location in Turkey Donduran (Turkey Aegean)
- Coordinates: 37°50′N 28°15′E
- Country: Turkey
- Province: Aydın
- District: Yenipazar
- Population (2022): 1,019
- Time zone: UTC+3 (TRT)

Donduran is a neighbourhood in the municipality and district of Yenipazar, Aydın Province, Turkey. Its population is 1,019 (2022).
