= Çöğürlük, Çine =

Çöğürlük
- Neighbourhood
- Location in Turkey Çöğürlük (Turkey Aegean)
- Coordinates: 37°39′53″N 27°55′57″E
- Country: Turkey
- Province: Aydın
- District: Çine
- Population (2022): 251
- Time zone: UTC+3 (TRT)

Çöğürlük is a neighbourhood in the municipality and district of Çine, Aydın Province, Turkey. Its population is 251 (2022).
