= Eğridere, Yenipazar =

Eğridere
- Neighbourhood
- Location in Turkey Eğridere (Turkey Aegean)
- Coordinates: 37.7500°N 28.1500°E
- Country: Turkey
- Province: Aydın
- District: Yenipazar
- Population (2022): 330
- Time zone: UTC+3 (TRT)

Eğridere is a neighbourhood in the municipality and district of Yenipazar, Aydın Province, Turkey. Its population is 330 (2022).
