= Kızılgüney, Çine =

Kızılgüney
- Neighbourhood
- Location in Turkey Kızılgüney (Turkey Aegean)
- Coordinates: 37.70°N 28.05°E
- Country: Turkey
- Province: Aydın
- District: Çine
- Population (2022): 56
- Time zone: UTC+3 (TRT)

Kızılgüney is a neighbourhood in the municipality and district of Çine, Aydın Province, Turkey. Its population is 56 (2022).
