= Işıklar, Karpuzlu =

Işıklar
- Neighbourhood
- Location in Turkey Işıklar (Turkey Aegean)
- Coordinates: 37.5167°N 27.8000°E
- Country: Turkey
- Province: Aydın
- District: Karpuzlu
- Population (2022): 131
- Time zone: UTC+3 (TRT)

Işıklar is a neighbourhood in the municipality and district of Karpuzlu, Aydın Province, Turkey. Its population is 131 (2022).
