= Bereket, Çine =

Bereket
- Neighbourhood
- Location in Turkey Bereket (Turkey Aegean)
- Coordinates: 37.6800°N 28.0869°E
- Country: Turkey
- Province: Aydın
- District: Çine
- Population (2022): 280
- Time zone: UTC+3 (TRT)

Bereket is a neighbourhood in the municipality and district of Çine, Aydın Province, Turkey. Its population is 280 (2022).
