= Kuruköy, Çine =

Kuruköy
- Neighbourhood
- Country: Turkey
- Province: Aydın
- District: Çine
- Population (2022): 740
- Time zone: UTC+3 (TRT)

Kuruköy is a neighbourhood in the municipality and district of Çine, Aydın Province, Turkey. Its population is 740 (2022).
