= Koyunlar, Yenipazar =

Koyunlar
- Neighbourhood
- Location in Turkey Koyunlar (Turkey Aegean)
- Coordinates: 37°45′N 28°14′E
- Country: Turkey
- Province: Aydın
- District: Yenipazar
- Population (2022): 383
- Time zone: UTC+3 (TRT)

Koyunlar is a neighbourhood in the municipality and district of Yenipazar, Aydın Province, Turkey. Its population is 383 (2022).
