= Karakollar, Çine =

Karakollar
- Neighbourhood
- Location in Turkey Karakollar (Turkey Aegean)
- Coordinates: 37°37′N 28°02′E
- Country: Turkey
- Province: Aydın
- District: Çine
- Population (2022): 1,611
- Time zone: UTC+3 (TRT)

Karakollar is a neighbourhood in the municipality and district of Çine, Aydın Province, Turkey. Its population is 1,611 (2022).
