= Bucak, Çine =

Bucak
- Neighbourhood
- Location in Turkey Bucak (Turkey Aegean)
- Coordinates: 37.6667°N 28.0167°E
- Country: Turkey
- Province: Aydın
- District: Çine
- Population (2022): 194
- Time zone: UTC+3 (TRT)

Bucak (also: Bucakköy) is a neighbourhood in the municipality and district of Çine, Aydın Province, Turkey. Its population is 194 (2022).
