= Özeren, Çine =

Özeren
- Neighbourhood
- Location in Turkey Özeren (Turkey Aegean)
- Coordinates: 37°42′N 27°59′E
- Country: Turkey
- Province: Aydın
- District: Çine
- Population (2022): 95
- Time zone: UTC+3 (TRT)

Özeren is a neighbourhood in the municipality and district of Çine, Aydın Province, Turkey. Its population is 95 (2022).
