= Kadılar, Çine =

Kadılar
- Neighbourhood
- Location in Turkey Kadılar (Turkey Aegean)
- Coordinates: 37.5000°N 27.9833°E
- Country: Turkey
- Province: Aydın
- District: Çine
- Population (2022): 153
- Time zone: UTC+3 (TRT)

Kadılar is a neighbourhood in the municipality and district of Çine, Aydın Province, Turkey. Its population is 153 (2022).
