= Doğanyurt, Çine =

Doğanyurt
- Neighbourhood
- Location in Turkey Doğanyurt (Turkey Aegean)
- Coordinates: 37.593°N 27.985°E
- Country: Turkey
- Province: Aydın
- District: Çine
- Population (2022): 419
- Time zone: UTC+3 (TRT)

Doğanyurt (formerly: Araphisar) is a neighbourhood in the municipality and district of Çine, Aydın Province, Turkey. Its population is 419 (2022).

Doğanyurt is 9 kilometres (5.6 mi) from the district seat, Çine, and 47 kilometres (29 mi) from the province seat, Aydin. The ruins of ancient Alabanda are found in the village and the surrounding fields.
