= Alabayır, Çine =

Alabayır
- Neighbourhood
- Location in Turkey Alabayır (Turkey Aegean)
- Coordinates: 37.5333°N 28.1667°E
- Country: Turkey
- Province: Aydın
- District: Çine
- Population (2022): 540
- Time zone: UTC+3 (TRT)

Alabayır is a neighbourhood in the municipality and district of Çine, Aydın Province, Turkey. Its population is 540 (2022).
