= Çavdar, Yenipazar =

Çavdar
- Neighbourhood
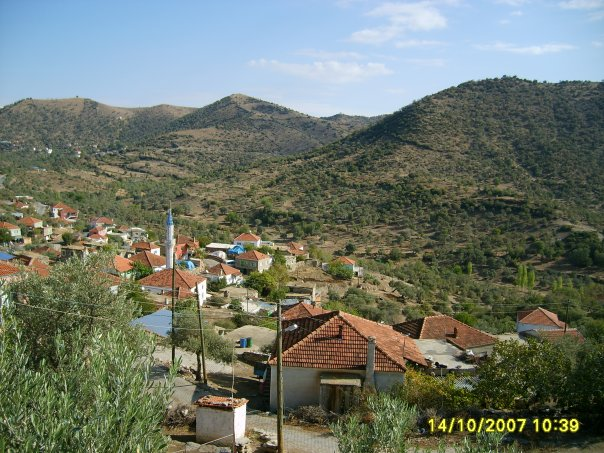

- Location within Turkey Location within Turkey Aegean
- Country: Turkey
- Province: Aydın
- District: Yenipazar
- Population (2022): 616
- Time zone: UTC+3 (TRT)

Çavdar (also: Çavdarköy) is a neighbourhood of 616 people (as of 2022) in the municipality and district of Yenipazar, Aydın Province, Turkey.
