= Paşaköy, Yenipazar =

Paşaköy
- Neighbourhood
- Country: Turkey
- Province: Aydın
- District: Yenipazar
- Population (2022): 325
- Time zone: UTC+3 (TRT)

Paşaköy is a neighbourhood in the municipality and district of Yenipazar, Aydın Province, Turkey. Its population is 325 (2022).
