= Seferler, Çine =

Seferler
- Neighbourhood
- Location in Turkey Seferler (Turkey Aegean)
- Coordinates: 37.5167°N 27.9667°E
- Country: Turkey
- Province: Aydın
- District: Çine
- Population (2022): 678
- Time zone: UTC+3 (TRT)

Seferler is a neighbourhood in the municipality and district of Çine, Aydın Province, Turkey. Its population is 678 (2022).
