= Çobanisa, Karpuzlu =

Çobanisa
- Neighbourhood
- Location in Turkey Çobanisa (Turkey Aegean)
- Coordinates: 37.5500°N 27.8833°E
- Country: Turkey
- Province: Aydın
- District: Karpuzlu
- Population (2022): 575
- Time zone: UTC+3 (TRT)

Çobanisa is a neighbourhood in the municipality and district of Karpuzlu, Aydın Province, Turkey. Its population is 575 (2022).
