= Dutluoluk, Çine =

Dutluoluk
- Neighbourhood
- Location in Turkey Dutluoluk (Turkey Aegean)
- Coordinates: 37°38′N 28°06′E
- Country: Turkey
- Province: Aydın
- District: Çine
- Population (2022): 327
- Time zone: UTC+3 (TRT)

Dutluoluk is a neighbourhood in the municipality and district of Çine, Aydın Province, Turkey. Its population is 327 (2022). The village is inhabited by Tahtacı.
