= Akdam, Çine =

Akdam
- Neighbourhood
- Location in Turkey Akdam (Turkey Aegean)
- Coordinates: 37.5587°N 27.9820°E
- Country: Turkey
- Province: Aydın
- District: Çine
- Population (2022): 59
- Time zone: UTC+3 (TRT)

Akdam is a neighbourhood in the municipality and district of Çine, Aydın Province, Turkey. Its population is 59 (2022).
