= Yolboyu, Çine =

Yolboyu
- Neighbourhood
- Location in Turkey Yolboyu (Turkey Aegean)
- Coordinates: 37.6333°N 28.0333°E
- Country: Turkey
- Province: Aydın
- District: Çine
- Population (2022): 527
- Time zone: UTC+3 (TRT)

Yolboyu is a neighbourhood in the municipality and district of Çine, Aydın Province, Turkey. Its population is 527 (2022).
