= Umur, Çine =

Umur
- Neighbourhood
- Location in Turkey Umur (Turkey Aegean)
- Coordinates: 37°32′N 28°02′E
- Country: Turkey
- Province: Aydın
- District: Çine
- Population (2022): 593
- Time zone: UTC+3 (TRT)

Umur (also: Umurköy) is a neighbourhood in the municipality and district of Çine, Aydın Province, Turkey. Its population is 593 (2022).
