= Sarıköy, Çine =

Sarıköy
- Neighbourhood
- Country: Turkey
- Province: Aydın
- District: Çine
- Population (2022): 176
- Time zone: UTC+3 (TRT)

Sarıköy is a neighbourhood in the municipality and district of Çine, Aydın Province, Turkey. Its population is 176 (2022).
