= Ünlüce, Çine =

Ünlüce
- Neighbourhood
- Location in Turkey Ünlüce (Turkey Aegean)
- Coordinates: 37.6667°N 28.0500°E
- Country: Turkey
- Province: Aydın
- District: Çine
- Population (2022): 132
- Time zone: UTC+3 (TRT)

Ünlüce is a neighbourhood in the municipality and district of Çine, Aydın Province, Turkey. Its population is 132 (2022).
