= Taşoluk, Kuyucak =

Taşoluk
- Neighbourhood
- Country: Turkey
- Province: Aydın
- District: Kuyucak
- Population (2022): 383
- Time zone: UTC+3 (TRT)

Taşoluk is a neighbourhood in the municipality and district of Kuyucak, Aydın Province, Turkey. Its population is 383 (2022).
