= Esentepe, Çine =

Esentepe
- Neighbourhood
- Country: Turkey
- Province: Aydın
- District: Çine
- Population (2022): 180
- Time zone: UTC+3 (TRT)

Esentepe is a neighbourhood in the municipality and district of Çine, Aydın Province, Turkey. Its population is 180 (2022).
