= Taşoluk, Çine =

Taşoluk
- Neighbourhood
- Location in Turkey Taşoluk (Turkey Aegean)
- Coordinates: 37.666°N 27.862°E
- Country: Turkey
- Province: Aydın
- District: Çine
- Population (2022): 46
- Time zone: UTC+3 (TRT)

Taşoluk is a neighbourhood in the municipality and district of Çine, Aydın Province, Turkey. Its population is 46 (2022).
