= Buharkent =

- District and municipality
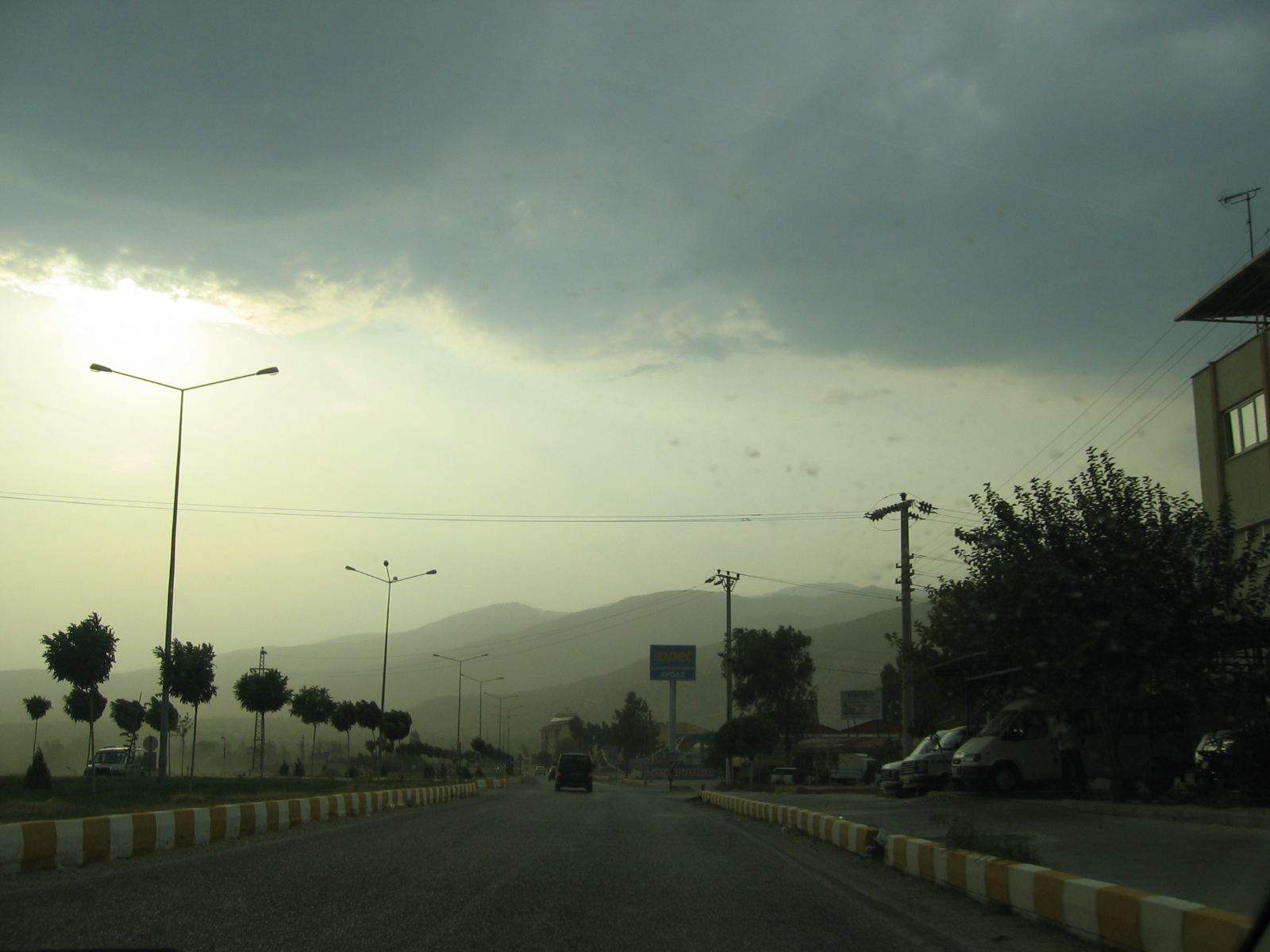
- road through Buharkent

- Map showing Buharkent District in Aydın Province

- Location within Turkey Location within Turkey Aegean
- Coordinates: 37°57′42″N 28°44′32″E
- Country: Turkey
- Province: Aydın

Government
  - Mayor: Mehmet Erol (AKP)
- Area: 124 km^{2} (48 sq mi)
- Population (2022): 13,022
  - Density: 105/km^{2} (272/sq mi)
- Time zone: UTC+3 (TRT)
- Postal code: 09670
- Area code: 0256
- Website: www.buharkent.bel.tr

Buharkent is a municipality and district of Aydın Province, Turkey. Its area is 124 km^{2}, and its population is 13,022 (2022). It is 86 km east of the city of Aydın, on the road and the railway line to Denizli.

The area is in the valley of the Büyük Menderes River with mountains to the north including the 1724 m Karlıkdede. The district is known for its hot springs and geothermal energy, indeed Turkey's first geothermal power station was built here in 1984. However the local economy depends on agriculture especially cotton, figs and grapes.

The name Buharkent means steam city and was given in recognition of the power station, it was previously called Burhaniye.

== Composition ==
There are 14 neighbourhoods in Buharkent District:

- Ericek
- Feslek
- Gelenbe
- Gündoğan
- İstiklal
- Kamilpaşa
- Kayaburnu
- Kızıldere
- Menderes
- Muratdağı
- Ortakçı
- Savcıllı
- Üçeylül
- Zafer

== Education ==
There are 1 kindergartens, 6 primary schools, 3 secondary schools, 3 high schools, 1 public education center affiliated with the Ministry of National Education in the district.
