= Kovuk, Karpuzlu =

Kovuk
- Neighbourhood
- Location in Turkey Kovuk (Turkey Aegean)
- Coordinates: 37.5333°N 27.8333°E
- Country: Turkey
- Province: Aydın
- District: Karpuzlu
- Population (2022): 454
- Time zone: UTC+3 (TRT)

Kovuk (also: Koğuk) is a neighbourhood in the municipality and district of Karpuzlu, Aydın Province, Turkey. Its population is 454 (2022).
