= Yenipazar, Aydın =

Yenipazar
- District and municipality
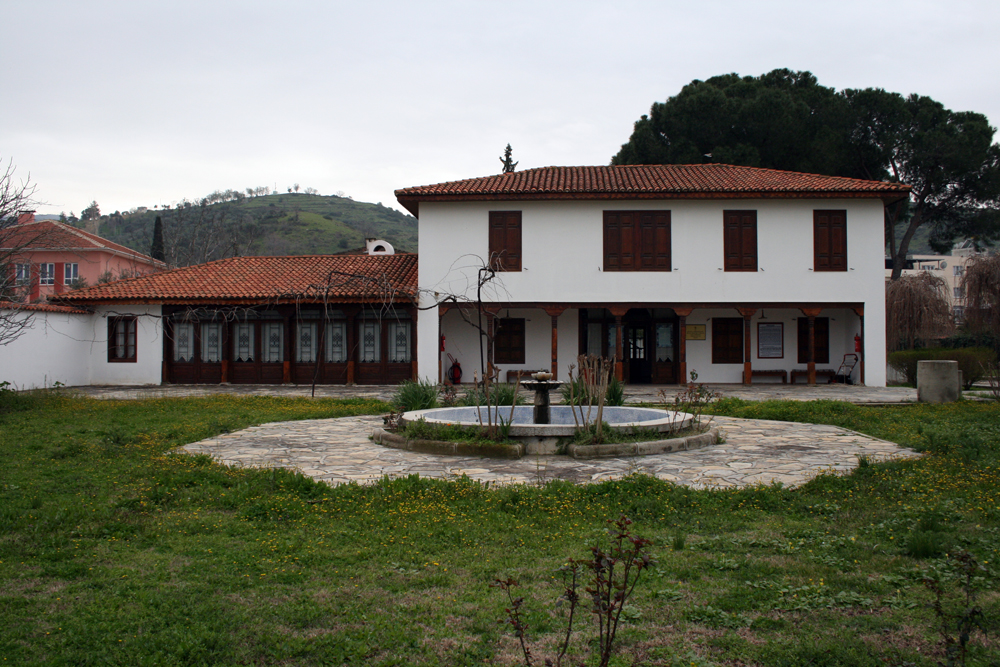

- Map showing Yenipazar District in Aydın Province

- Location within Turkey Location within Turkey Aegean
- Coordinates: 37°49′37″N 28°11′51″E
- Country: Turkey
- Province: Aydın

Government
  - Mayor: Malik Ercan (AKP)
- Area: 245 km^{2} (95 sq mi)
- Population (2022): 11,863
  - Density: 48.4/km^{2} (125/sq mi)
- Time zone: UTC+3 (TRT)
- Postal code: 09350
- Area code: 0256

Yenipazar (Turkish for "new market") is a municipality and district of Aydın Province, Turkey. Its area is 245 km^{2}, and its population is 11,863 (2022). It is 45 km (28 mi) from the city of Aydın on the road to Denizli.

Yenipazar itself is a quiet rural town providing university, high and elementary school education and other facilities to the surrounding districts. The student population created new income opportunities for the residents of this small town. However, in the last two decades, the population has declined as people move to Turkey's larger cities for higher education and in search for job opportunities. On the top of that, Yenipazar is selected as one of the Cittaslow towns, which is an organization whose goals include improving the quality of life in towns by slowing down its overall pace of the cities all around the world. The local cuisine includes a delicious flat-bread pizza called pide. Social life is also impacted from the student population.

== Composition ==
There are 18 neighbourhoods in Yenipazar District:

- Alhan
- Alioğullar
- Çarşı
- Çavdar
- Çulhan
- Dereköy
- Direcik
- Doğu
- Donduran
- Eğridere
- Hacıköseler
- Hamzabalı
- Hükümet
- Karaçakal
- Karacaören
- Koyunlar
- Paşaköy
- Yeni

== Places of interest ==
- The house of prominent local Turkish War of Independence resistance leader Yörük Ali Efe is now a museum to his life and career.
- Yenipazar Stadium has been hosting amateur local football games.
