= Kızıldere, Buharkent =

Kızıldere
- Neighbourhood
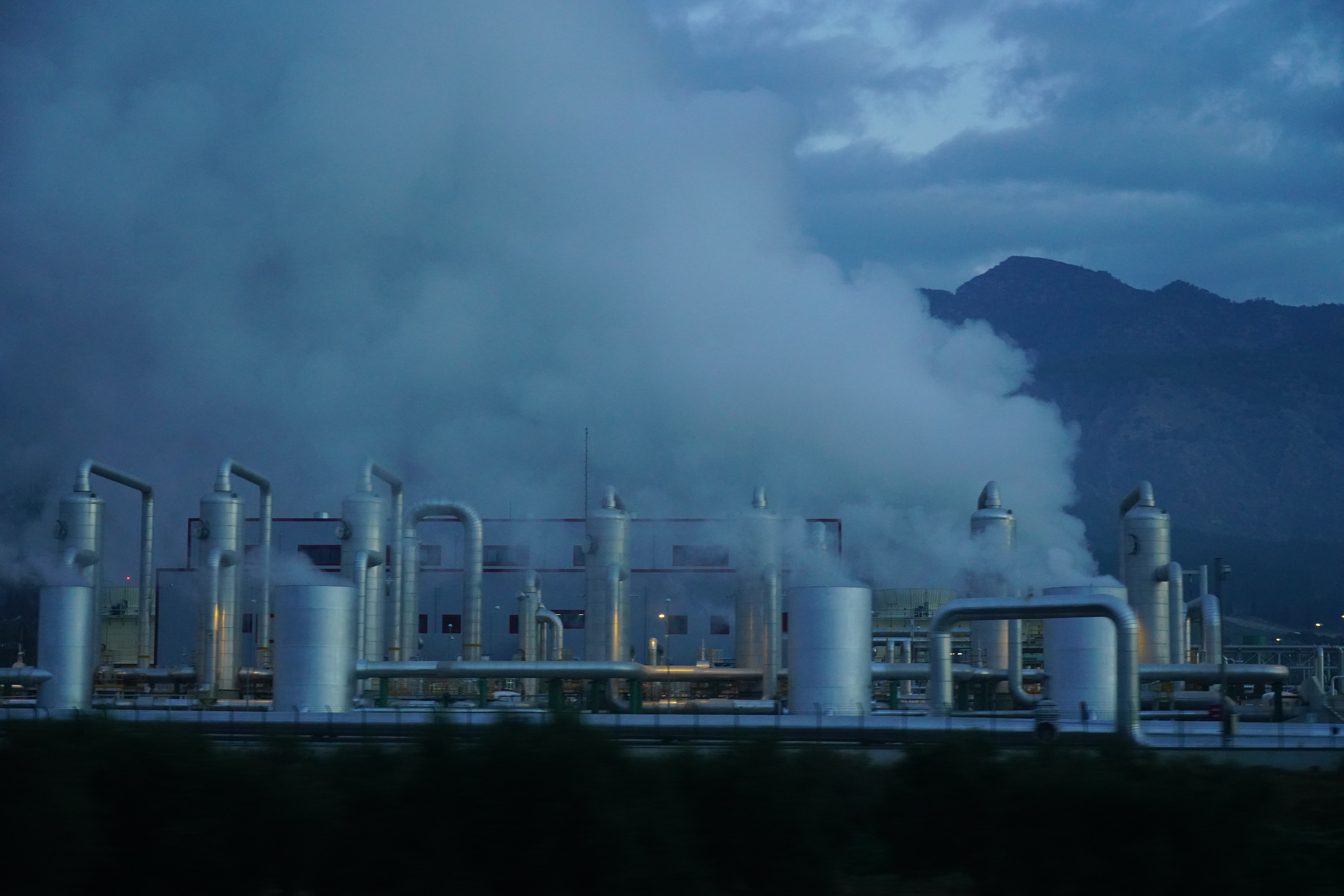
- Kızıldere Geothermal Power Plant

- Location within Turkey Location within Turkey Aegean
- Coordinates: 37.9700°N 28.8050°E
- Country: Turkey
- Province: Aydın
- District: Buharkent
- Population (2022): 559
- Time zone: UTC+3 (TRT)

Kızıldere is a neighbourhood in the municipality and district of Buharkent, Aydın Province, Turkey. Its population is 559 (2022).
