= Sarnıç, Çine =

Sarnıç
- Neighbourhood
- Location in Turkey Sarnıç (Turkey Aegean)
- Coordinates: 37.6667°N 28.1000°E
- Country: Turkey
- Province: Aydın
- District: Çine
- Population (2022): 209
- Time zone: UTC+3 (TRT)

Sarnıç (also: Sarnıçköy) is a neighbourhood in the municipality and district of Çine, Aydın Province, Turkey. Its population is 209 (2022).
