= Söğütçük, Çine =

Söğütçük
- Neighbourhood
- Location in Turkey Söğütçük (Turkey Aegean)
- Coordinates: 37.4903°N 28.1169°E
- Country: Turkey
- Province: Aydın
- District: Çine
- Population (2022): 97
- Time zone: UTC+3 (TRT)

Söğütçük is a neighbourhood in the municipality and district of Çine, Aydın Province, Turkey. Its population is 97 (2022).
