= Çatak, Çine =

Village in Aydın Province, Turkey

Çatak
- Neighbourhood
- Country: Turkey
- Province: Aydın
- District: Çine
- Population (2022): 171
- Time zone: UTC+3 (TRT)

Çatak is a neighbourhood in the municipality and district of Çine, Aydın Province, Turkey. Its population is 171 (2022).
