= Yörükler, Çine =

Yörükler
- Neighbourhood
- Country: Turkey
- Province: Aydın
- District: Çine
- Population (2022): 147
- Time zone: UTC+3 (TRT)

Yörükler is a neighbourhood in the municipality and district of Çine, Aydın Province, Turkey. Its population is 147 (2022).

== History ==
While it was previously a village as an administrative division, it became a neighbourhood after the law change in 2012.
