= Çatak, Nazilli =

Çatak
- Neighbourhood
- Location in Turkey Çatak (Turkey Aegean)
- Coordinates: 38°2′3″N 28°19′0″E
- Country: Turkey
- Province: Aydın
- District: Nazilli
- Population (2022): 159
- Time zone: UTC+3 (TRT)

Çatak is a neighbourhood in the municipality and district of Nazilli, Aydın Province, Turkey. Its population is 159 (2022). A mountainous village, it lies near the border with İzmir Province.
