= Cumalı, Çine =

Cumalı
- Neighbourhood
- Location in Turkey Cumalı (Turkey Aegean)
- Coordinates: 37.6750°N 27.9964°E
- Country: Turkey
- Province: Aydın
- District: Çine
- Population (2022): 453
- Time zone: UTC+3 (TRT)

Cumalı is a neighbourhood in the municipality and district of Çine, Aydın Province, Turkey. Its population is 453 (2022).
