= Bağlarbaşı, Çine =

Bağlarbaşı
- Neighbourhood
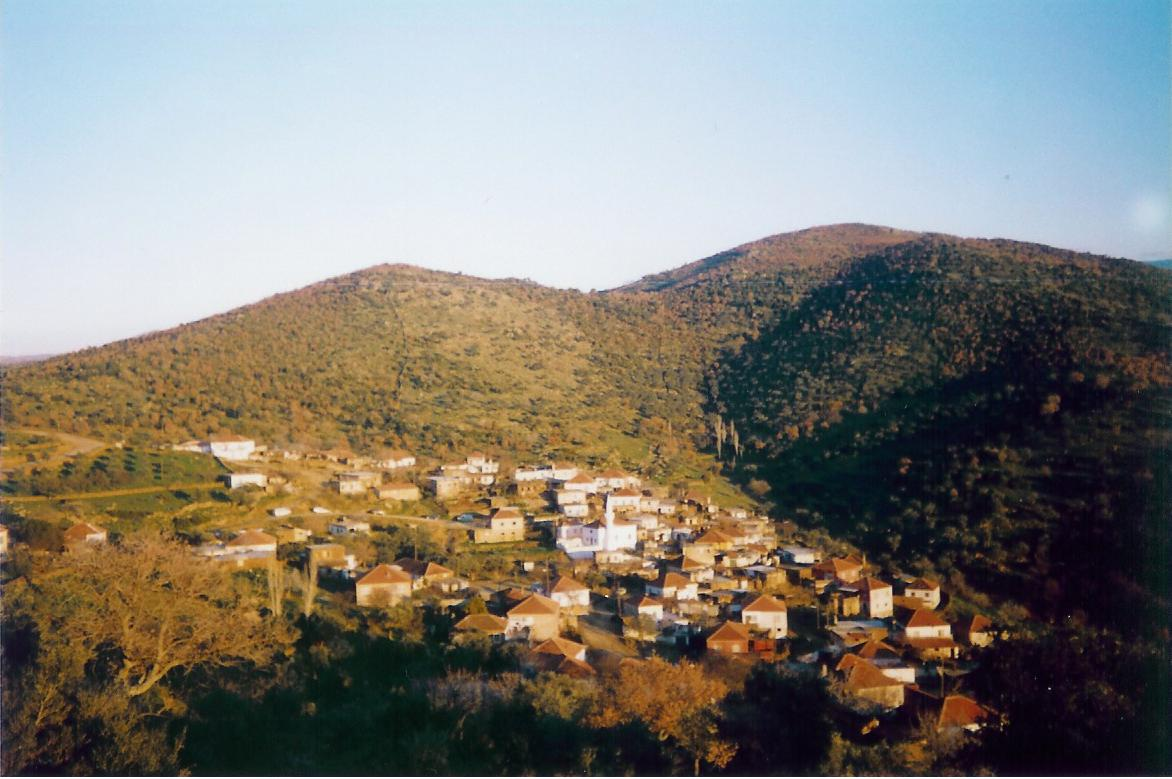

- Location within Turkey Location within Turkey Aegean
- Coordinates: 37.7079°N 28.0605°E
- Country: Turkey
- Province: Aydın
- District: Çine
- Population (2022): 107
- Time zone: UTC+3 (TRT)

Bağlarbaşı is a neighbourhood in the municipality and district of Çine, Aydın Province, Turkey. Its population is 107 (2022).
