= Dereli, Çine =

Dereli
- Neighbourhood
- Location in Turkey Dereli (Turkey Aegean)
- Coordinates: 37.5500°N 27.9500°E
- Country: Turkey
- Province: Aydın
- District: Çine
- Population (2022): 90
- Time zone: UTC+3 (TRT)

Dereli is a neighbourhood in the municipality and district of Çine, Aydın Province, Turkey. Its population is 90 (2022).
