= Dərəli =

- Location within Azerbaijan
- Coordinates: 39°10′49″N 46°26′35″E
- Country: Azerbaijan
- District: Zangilan
- Time zone: UTC+4 (AZT)
  - Summer (DST): UTC+5 (AZT)

Dərəli is a village in the Zangilan Rayon of Azerbaijan.
