= Saraçlar, Çine =

Saraçlar
- Neighbourhood
- Location in Turkey Saraçlar (Turkey Aegean)
- Coordinates: 37.6267°N 27.9261°E
- Country: Turkey
- Province: Aydın
- District: Çine
- Population (2022): 468
- Time zone: UTC+3 (TRT)

Saraçlar is a neighbourhood in the municipality and district of Çine, Aydın Province, Turkey. Its population is 468 (2022).
