= Kabataş, Çine =

Kabataş
- Neighbourhood
- Location in Turkey Kabataş (Turkey Aegean)
- Coordinates: 37.5667°N 27.9833°E
- Country: Turkey
- Province: Aydın
- District: Çine
- Population (2022): 378
- Time zone: UTC+3 (TRT)

Kabataş is a neighbourhood in the municipality and district of Çine, Aydın Province, Turkey. Its population is 378 (2022).
