= Cumali (Turkish name) =

Cumali (and its variant Cumalı) is a masculine given name and a surname. People with the name include:

== Given name ==
- Cumali Bişi (born 1993), Turkish footballer

== Surname ==
- Necati Cumalı (1921–2001), Turkish writer
