= Sağlık, Çine =

Sağlık
- Neighbourhood
- Location in Turkey Sağlık (Turkey Aegean)
- Coordinates: 37.5167°N 27.9500°E
- Country: Turkey
- Province: Aydın
- District: Çine
- Population (2022): 161
- Time zone: UTC+3 (TRT)

Sağlık is a neighbourhood in the municipality and district of Çine, Aydın Province, Turkey. Its population is 161 (2022).
