= Altınova, Çine =

Altınova
- Neighbourhood
- Location in Turkey Altınova (Turkey Aegean)
- Coordinates: 37.6885°N 27.9982°E
- Country: Turkey
- Province: Aydın
- District: Çine
- Population (2022): 280
- Time zone: UTC+3 (TRT)

Altınova is a neighbourhood in the municipality and district of Çine, Aydın Province, Turkey. Its population is 280 (2022).
