= Akdam, Alanya =

Akdam
- Neighbourhood
- Location in Turkey
- Coordinates: 36.6397°N 31.8044°E
- Country: Turkey
- Province: Antalya
- District: Alanya
- Population (2022): 1,371
- Time zone: UTC+3 (TRT)

Akdam is a neighbourhood in the municipality and district of Alanya, Antalya Province, Turkey. Its population is 1,371 (2022). It lies about 25.8 km, or 16.0 miles from the resort town of Alanya.
