= Yeşilköy, Söke =

Yeşilköy
- Neighbourhood
- Location in Turkey Yeşilköy (Turkey Aegean)
- Coordinates: 37.5756°N 27.4647°E
- Country: Turkey
- Province: Aydın
- District: Söke
- Population (2022): 254
- Time zone: UTC+3 (TRT)

Yeşilköy is a neighbourhood in the municipality and district of Söke, Aydın Province, Turkey. Its population is 254 (2022).
