= Çine =

- District and municipality
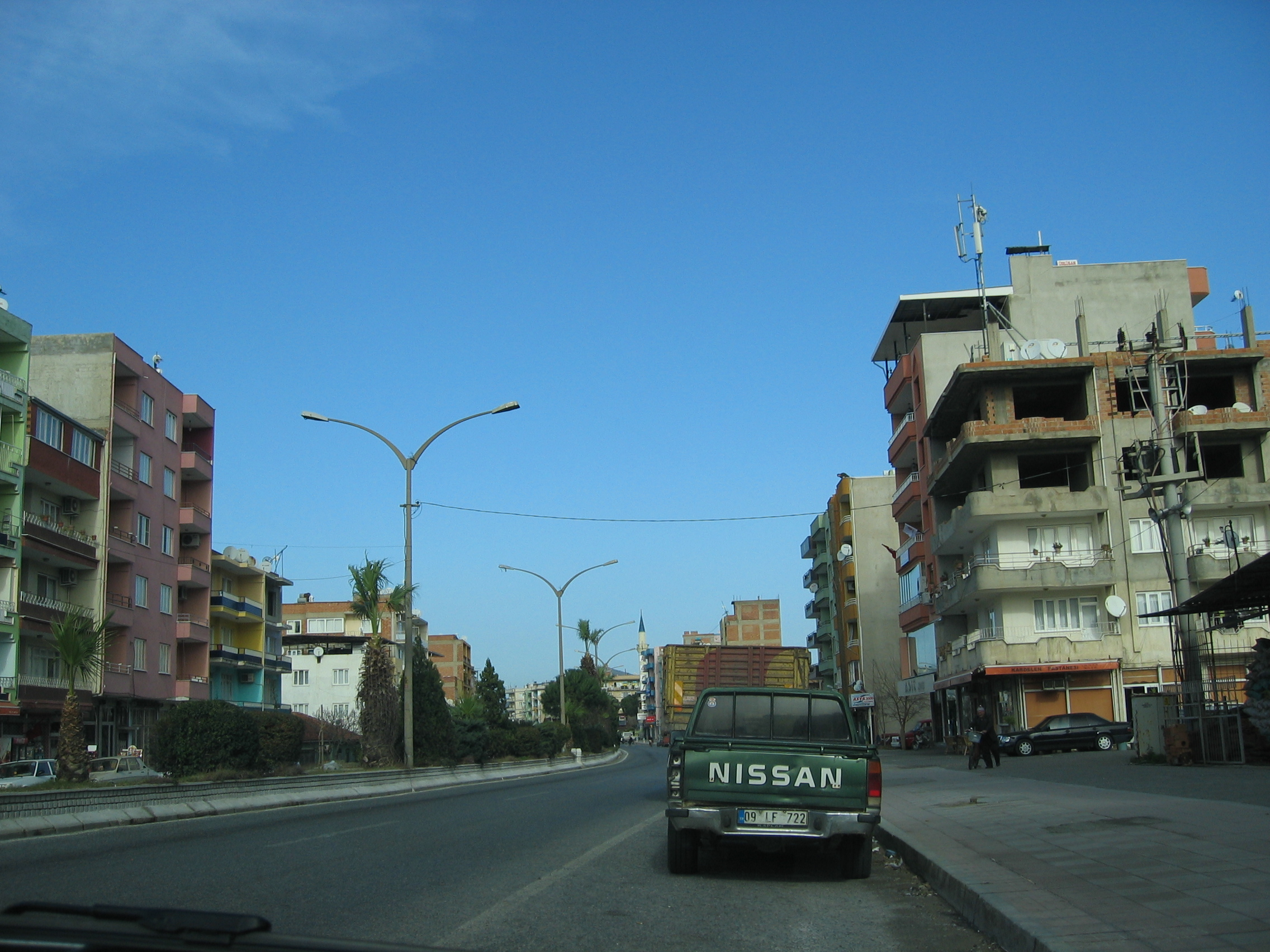

- Map showing Çine District in Aydın Province

- Location within Turkey Location within Turkey Aegean
- Coordinates: 37°36′42″N 28°03′41″E
- Country: Turkey
- Province: Aydın

Government
  - Mayor: Enver Salih Dinçer (CHP)
- Area: 820 km^{2} (320 sq mi)
- Population (2022): 48,466
  - Density: 59/km^{2} (150/sq mi)
- Time zone: UTC+3 (TRT)
- Postal code: 09500
- Area code: 0256
- Website: www.cine.bel.tr

Çine is a municipality and district of Aydın Province, Turkey. Its area is 820 km^{2}, and its population is 48,466 (2022). It is 38 km (24 mi) from the city of Aydın, on the road to Muğla.

== History ==
Throughout the ages this area has belonged to the Ionians, Caria, Lydians, Persia, Ancient Rome and Byzantium, was viciously fought over by the Seljuk Turks and Byzantines, eventually ending up in the hands of the Anatolian beylik of the Menteşe. The original settlement is 8 km south of the modern town.

In 1426 the area was brought into the Ottoman Empire by Murat II. From 1867 until 1922, Çine was part of Aidin Vilayet. The town grew in the 19th century when following the Russo-Turkish War of 1877-1878 displaced Turks from Russia were resettled here by Sultan Abdul Hamid II. The town was destroyed by fire in 1900 and rebuilt.

== Geography ==
Formerly known as Kıroba, Çine is an attractive rural district in the southern part of the valley of the Büyük Menderes River, on the southern flank of Madran mountain. The local economy depends on mining of quartz and amethyst, forestry and agriculture. The Çine Dam and its hydro-electric power station were completed in 2013. The local cuisine features köfte and fish.

== Composition ==
There are 72 neighbourhoods in Çine District:

- Akçaova
- Akdam
- Alabayır
- Altınabat
- Altınova
- Bağlarbaşı
- Bahçearası
- Bedirler
- Bereket
- Bölüntü
- Bucak
- Çaltı
- Camızağılı
- Çatak
- Çöğürlük
- Cumalı
- Cumhuriyet
- Dereli
- Doğanyurt
- Dorumlar
- Dutluoluk
- Elderesi
- Esentepe
- Eskiçine
- Evciler
- Gökyaka
- Hacıpaşalar
- Hallaçlar
- Hamitabat
- Hasanlar
- İbrahimkavağı
- Kabalar
- Kabataş
- Kadılar
- Kahraman
- Karahayıt
- Karakollar
- Karanfiller
- Kargı
- Kasar
- Kavşıt
- Kirazderesi
- Kırkışık
- Kırksakallar
- Kızılgüney
- Kuruköy
- Mutaflar
- Ovacık
- Özeren
- Sağlık
- Saraçlar
- Sarıköy
- Sarıoğlu
- Sarnıç
- Seferler
- Şevketiye
- Soğancılar
- Soğukoluk
- Söğütçük
- Subaşı
- Taşoluk
- Tatarmemişler
- Tepeköy
- Topçam
- Umur
- Ünlüce
- Yağcılar
- Yeni
- Yeniköy
- Yeşilköy
- Yolboyu
- Yörükler

== Education ==
There are 3 kindergartens, 25 primary schools, 5 secondary schools, 9 high schools, 1 public education center, 1 vocational training center, 1 science and art center, and 1 special education practice center affiliated with the Ministry of National Education in the district.
