= Aydın Province =

Province of Turkey

Coordinates: 37°43′42″N 27°56′14″E

Aydın Province Aydın İli
- Province and metropolitan municipality
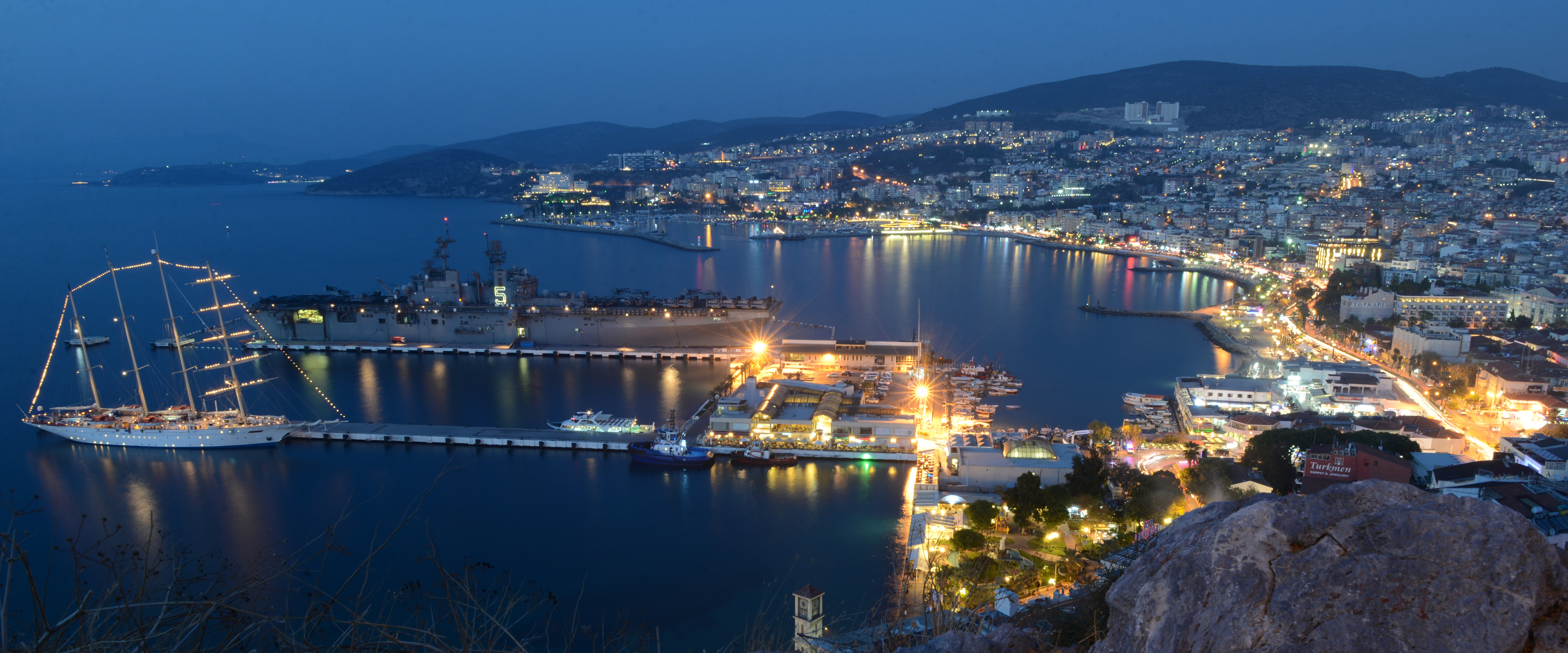

- Location of the province within Turkey
- Country: Turkey
- Seat: Aydın

Government
  - Mayor: Özlem Çerçioğlu (AKP)
  - Vali: Osman Varol
- Area: 8,116 km^{2} (3,134 sq mi)
- Population (2022): 1,148,241
  - Density: 141.5/km^{2} (366.4/sq mi)
- Time zone: UTC+3 (TRT)
- Area code: 0256
- Website: www.aydin.bel.tr www.aydin.gov.tr

Aydın Province (Turkish: Aydın ili) is a province and metropolitan municipality of southwestern Turkey, located in the Aegean Region. Its area is 8,116 km^{2}, and its population is 1,148,241 (2022). The provincial capital is the city of Aydın. Other towns in the province include the summer seaside resorts of Didim and Kuşadası.

== Geography ==
Neighboring provinces are Manisa to the north east, İzmir to the north, Denizli to the east, Muğla to the south.

The central and western parts of the province are fertile plains watered by the largest river in the Aegean region the Büyük Menderes River, with the Aydın Mountains to the north and the Menteşe Mountains to the south. The western end of the province is the Aegean coast with Lake Bafa a major feature of the Menderes delta area. The climate is typical of the Aegean region, very hot in summer. The Germencik region contains a number of hot springs.

=== Districts ===

Aydın province is divided into 17 districts:

- Bozdoğan
- Buharkent
- Çine
- Didim
- Efeler (central)
- Germencik
- Incirliova
- Karacasu
- Karpuzlu
- Koçarlı
- Köşk
- Kuşadası
- Kuyucak
- Nazilli
- Söke
- Sultanhisar
- Yenipazar

=== Flora ===
Much of the countryside is a mix of fig, olive and citrus trees, especially figs.

== Economy ==
The major sources of income are agriculture and tourism.

=== Tourism ===
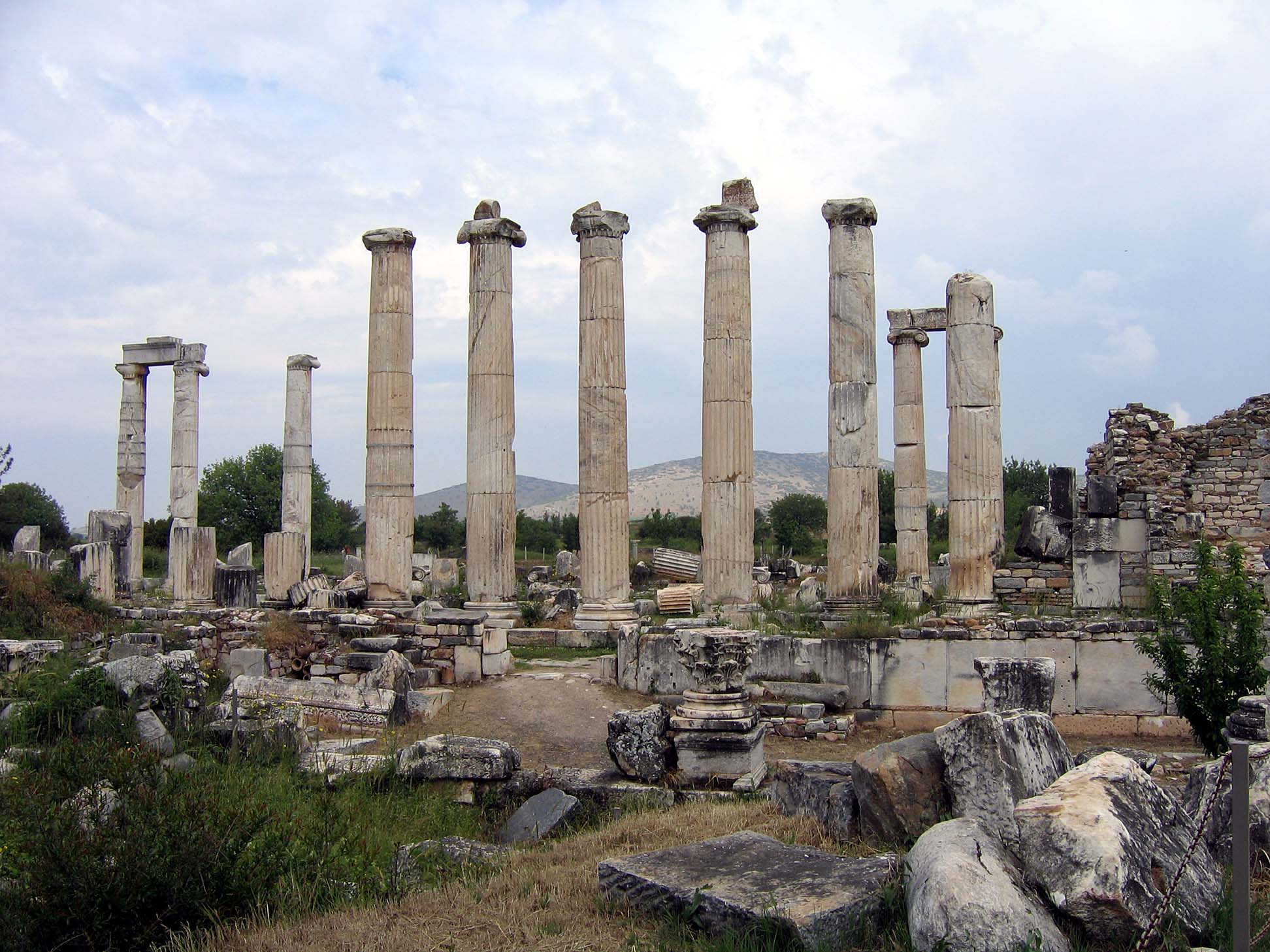
Temple of Aphrodite in Aphrodisias

The coastal towns of Didim and Kuşadası in particular are tourist resorts. Kuşadası is near to the Dilek Peninsula - Büyük Menderes Delta National Park, while Didim has a temple of Apollo, beaches, and the ancient ruins of Miletos nearby. The province contains archeological sites, including the ancient Carian cities of Alinda and Alabanda.

=== Agriculture ===
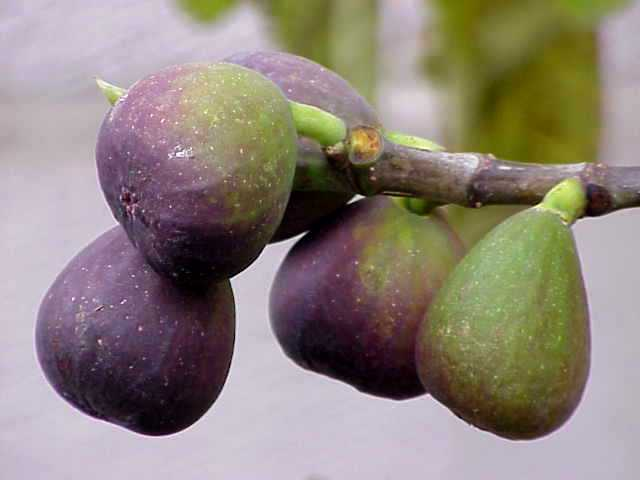
Aydın figs

Aydın is Turkey's leading producer of figs and exports dried figs worldwide. The very name by which the fruit was called in the world markets was "Smyrna figs" until recently, due to the preponderance of figs exported from İzmir over other species of the genus. But İzmir got the name by being the center for the wholesale trade and exports, while in fact the fruit was traditionally cultivated in Aydın. The term used within Turkey is "Aydın figs" (Turkish: Aydın inciri). Turkey's yearly production of roughly 50,000 tons of dried figs, is almost all from Aydın, Within Aydın province, the best figs are reputed to be grown in Germencik. Aydın produces olives from the varieties of Memecik, Manzanilla, and Gemlik, as well as chestnuts, cotton, citrus fruits, water melons and other fruits.

Orange and tangerine cultivation has increased in Aydın in recent years.

=== Industry ===
Aydın has some light industry

Adnan Menderes University was built in the city of Aydın in 1990s and has branches throughout the province.

== Places of interest ==
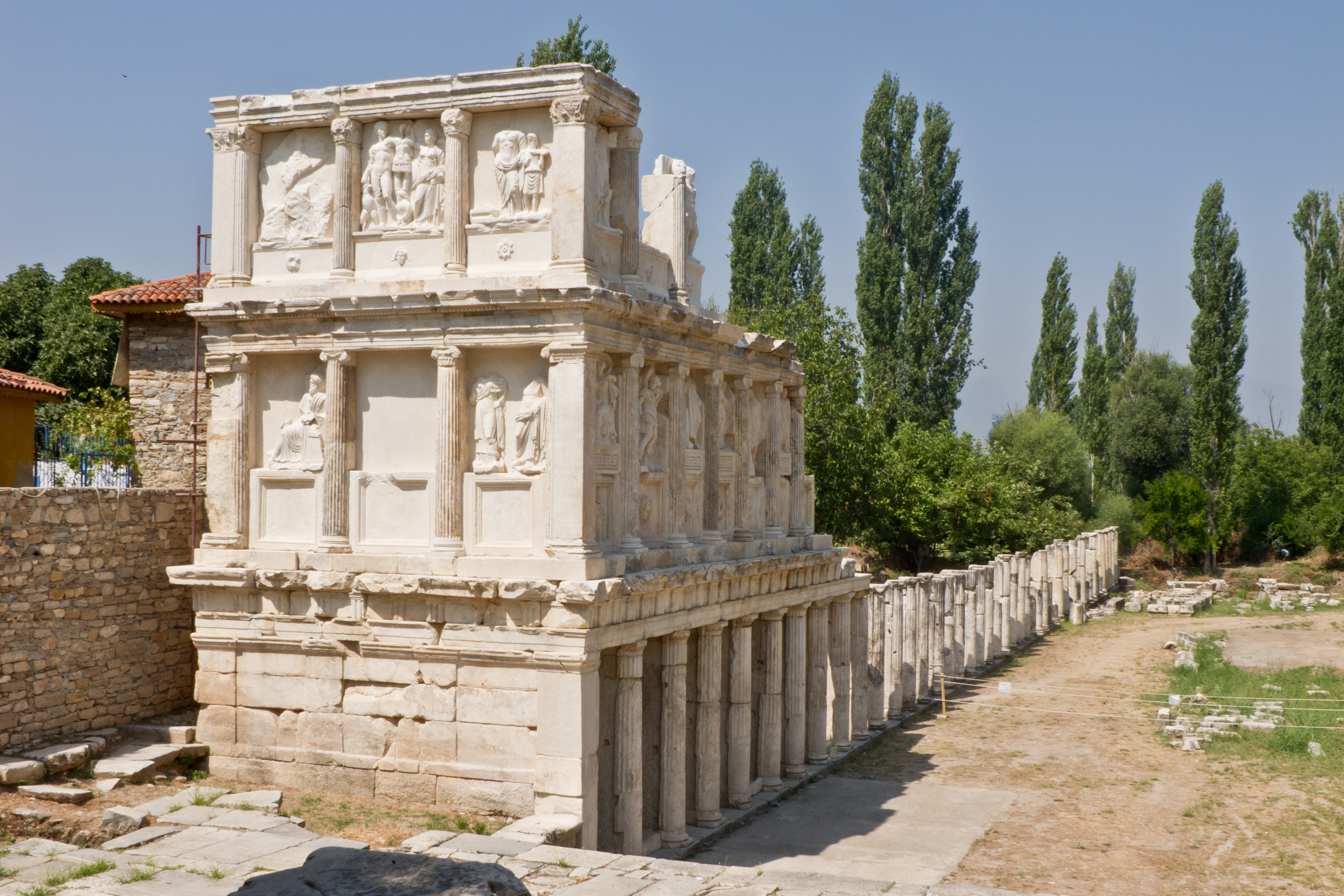
The Sebasteion of Aphrodisias

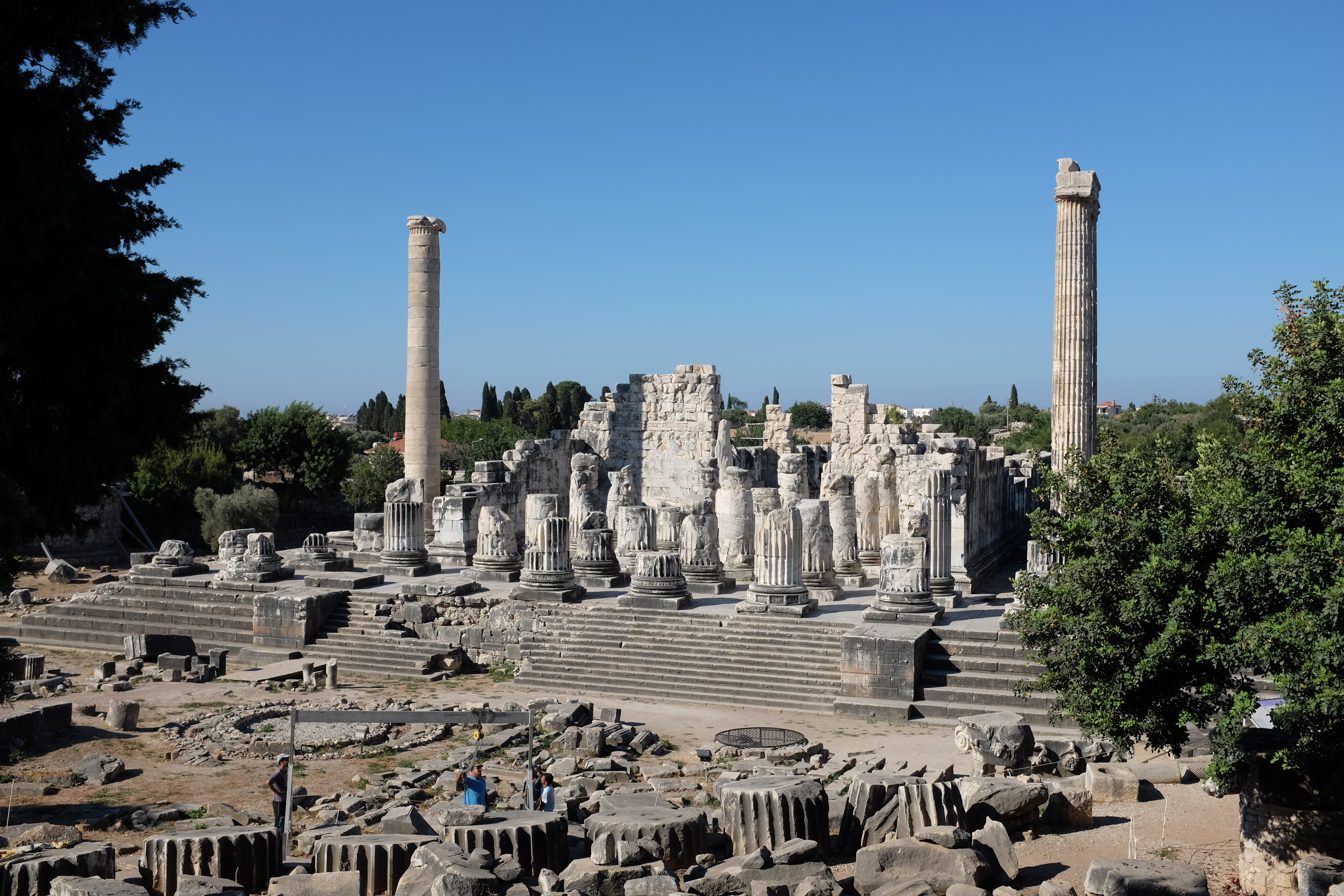
Temple of Apollo in Didyma

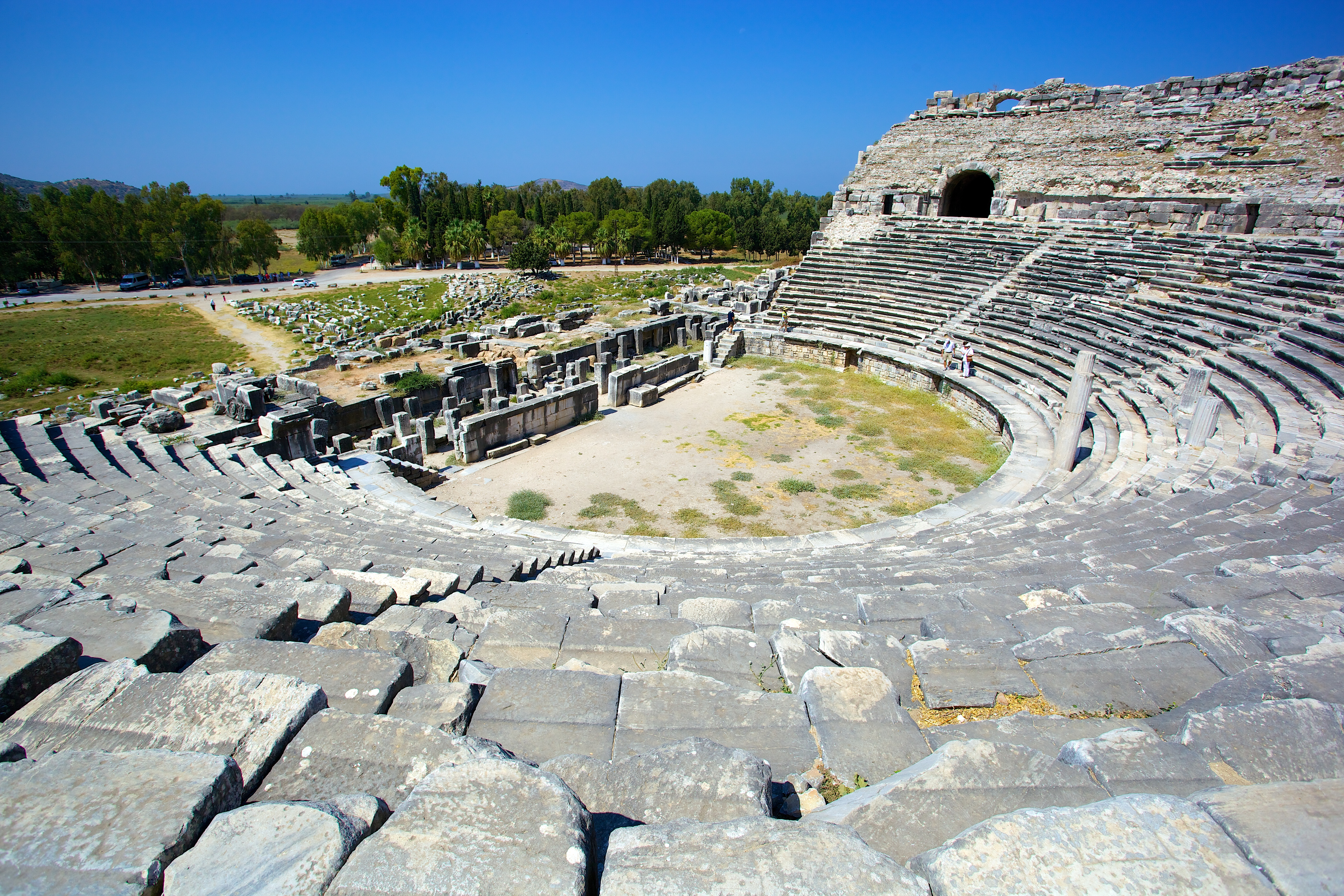
Ancient theatre of Miletus

The city of Aydın has a number of antique ruins and Ottoman period mosques. The province's countryside and scenery include a stretch of the Aegean coast and a number of historic sites including:

- Didim coastal resort with large temple of Apollo and nearby
  - Miletus ruins of an Ancient Greek city
    - Ilyas Bey Complex, a cultural heritage of Turkey built in 1403
- Kuşadası coastal resort, near to the Dilek Peninsula - Büyük Menderes Delta National Park
- Kirazli - a traditional Turkish village with old stone houses
- Alinda - ancient ruins
- Harpasa - ancient city in Nazilli and Arpaz Castle, also known as Arpaz Beyler Mansion.
- Alabanda - ancient ruins
- Magnesia ad Maeandrum - ancient ruins, on the Ortaklar-Söke road in Germencik
- Nysa - another ruined Carian city, in Sultanhisar
- Aphrodisias - more ancient ruins, including tombs, friezes and sculpture, in Karacasu
- Priene - another ruin, near Söke
- Mycale Mountains

== Culture ==
Aydın is the home of the Zeybek folk art. This involves a special type of war dance which is performed in a ring to resemble birds. The Zeybek is performed to sounds of the Kiteli and other Turkish folk instruments.

The folk songs of Aydın are famously short, indeed a popular saying in the Aegean region to get someone to stop talking, is Keep it short, make it an Aydın tune.

The cuisine features the typical Turkish pastries, Aegean cuisine (vegetable dishes with olive oil), köfte and kebab.

== Transport ==
=== Roads ===
İzmir to Aydın motorway, Motorway O-31, was built in the 1990s and is the city's main thoroughfare. An extension of this motorway to Denizli is currently under construction, with longer-term plans to extend it to Antalya.

=== Railway ===
There is a passenger train service passing through Aydın, connecting the city to İzmir and Denizli. This passenger train runs five trains per day.

== See also ==
- List of populated places in Aydın Province
