= Mastaura =

Mastaura may refer to:

- Mastaura (Caria)
- Mastaura (Lycia)
