= Altıntaş, Nazilli =

Village in Turkey

Altıntaş
- Neighbourhood
- Location within Turkey Location within Turkey Aegean
- Coordinates: 37°55′02″N 28°19′37″E
- Country: Turkey
- Province: Aydın
- District: Nazilli
- Population (2024): 2,602
- Time zone: UTC+3 (TRT)

Altıntaş is a neighbourhood in the municipality and district of Nazilli, Aydın Province, Turkey. Its population is 2,602 (2024).

Altıntaş is the city centre of Nazilli and was previously known as Pazarköy and later Upper Nazilli. The neighbourhood includes historic buildings such as the Koca Mosque and Dokuzun Hamam, dating to the Ottoman period, as well as Uzun Çarşı, the main bazaar of the district. The railway station of Nazilli is also located in Altıntaş.

The station, located on the İzmir–Eğirdir railway line and serving as the starting point of the closed Sümerbank Branch railway line, the station was built by the Ottoman Railway Company (ORC) and entered service in 1881.

On 30 December 2022, 8 people were killed after a gas explosion occurred in the kitchen of a restaurant in Altıntaş.

== Gallery ==
Gallery

The station

Altıntaş, Railway crossing and tower.
