= List of ancient amphitheatres in Turkey =

Below is the list of ancient amphitheatres in Turkey.

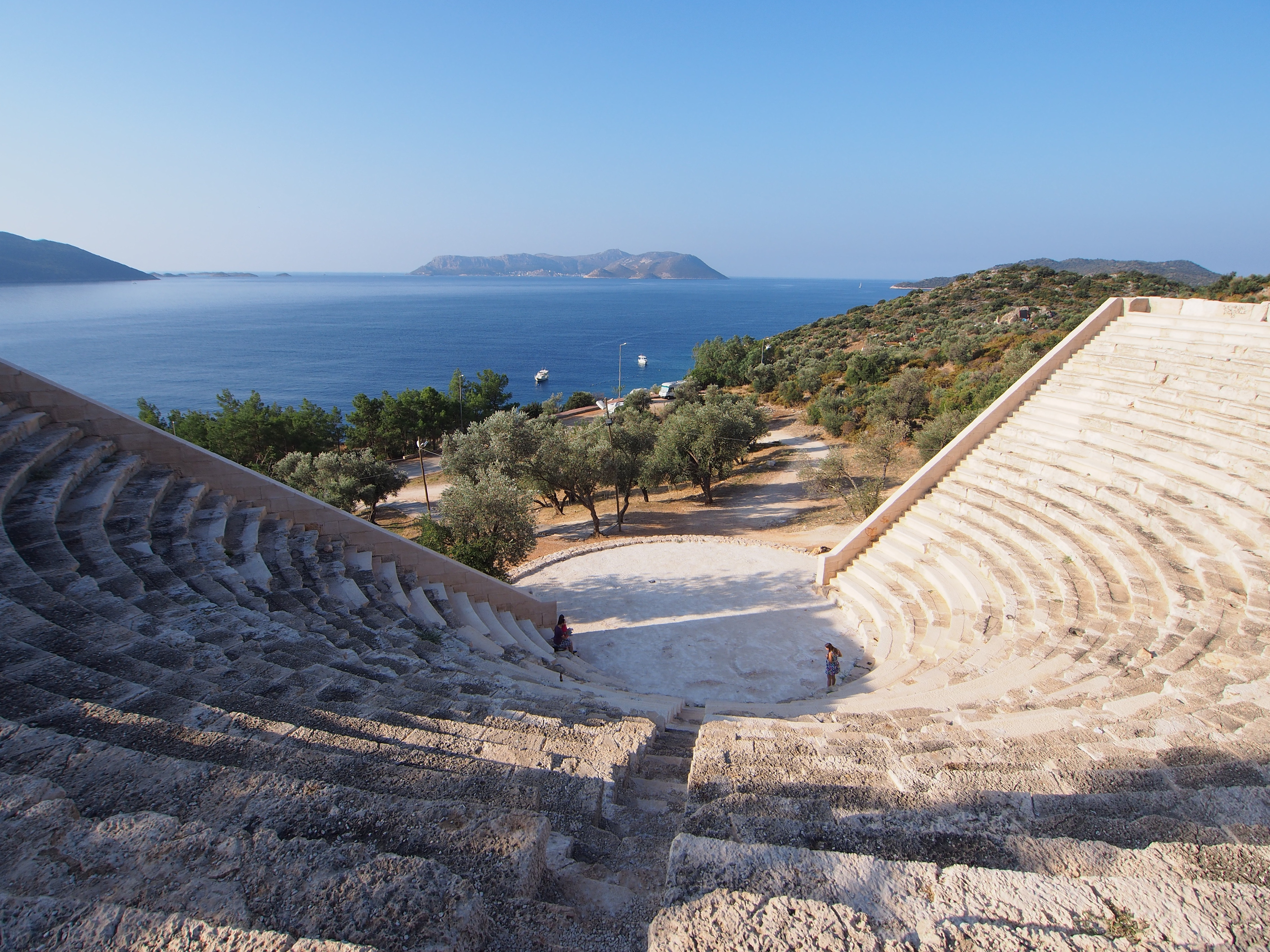
Antiphellus

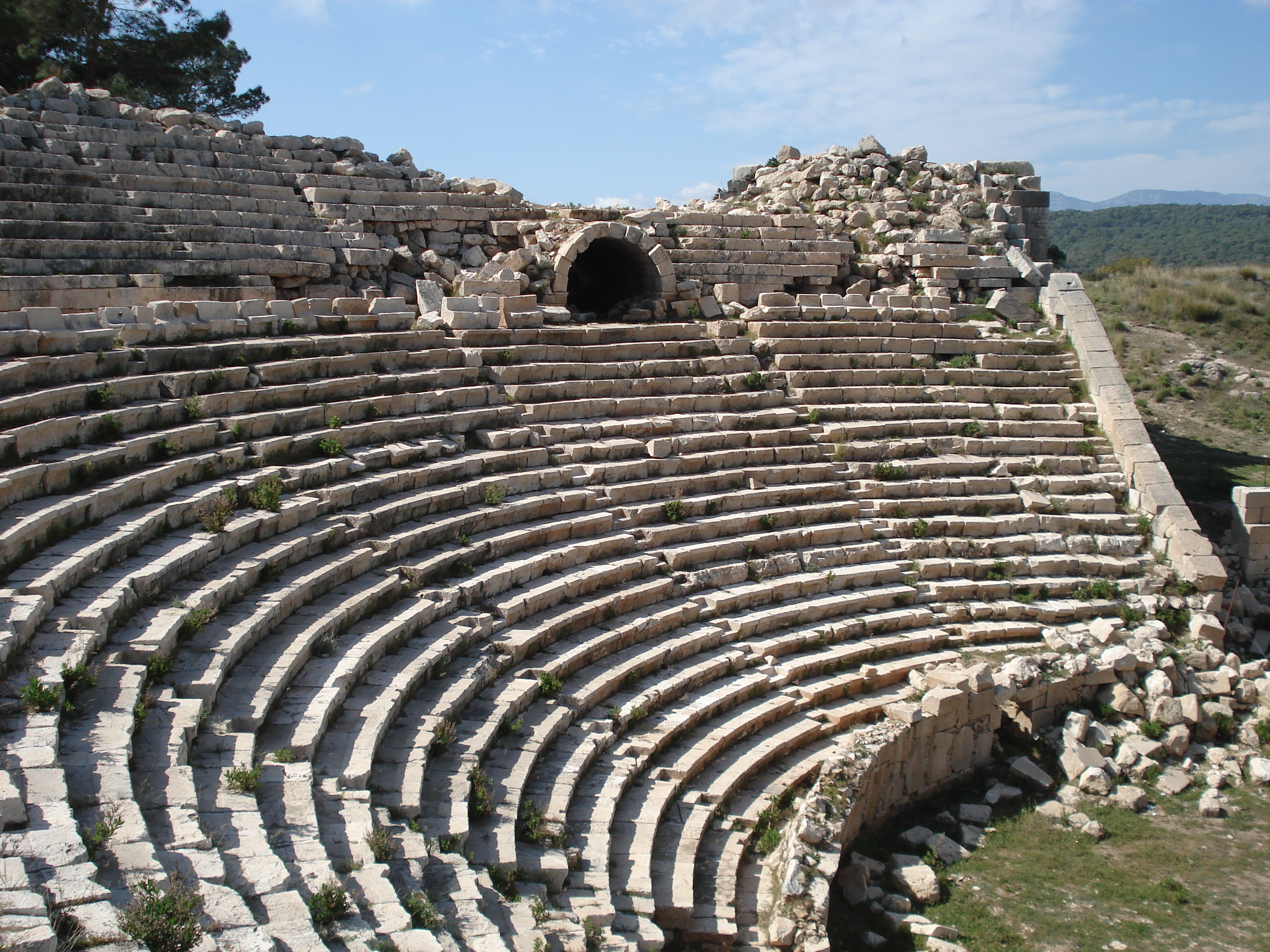
Patara

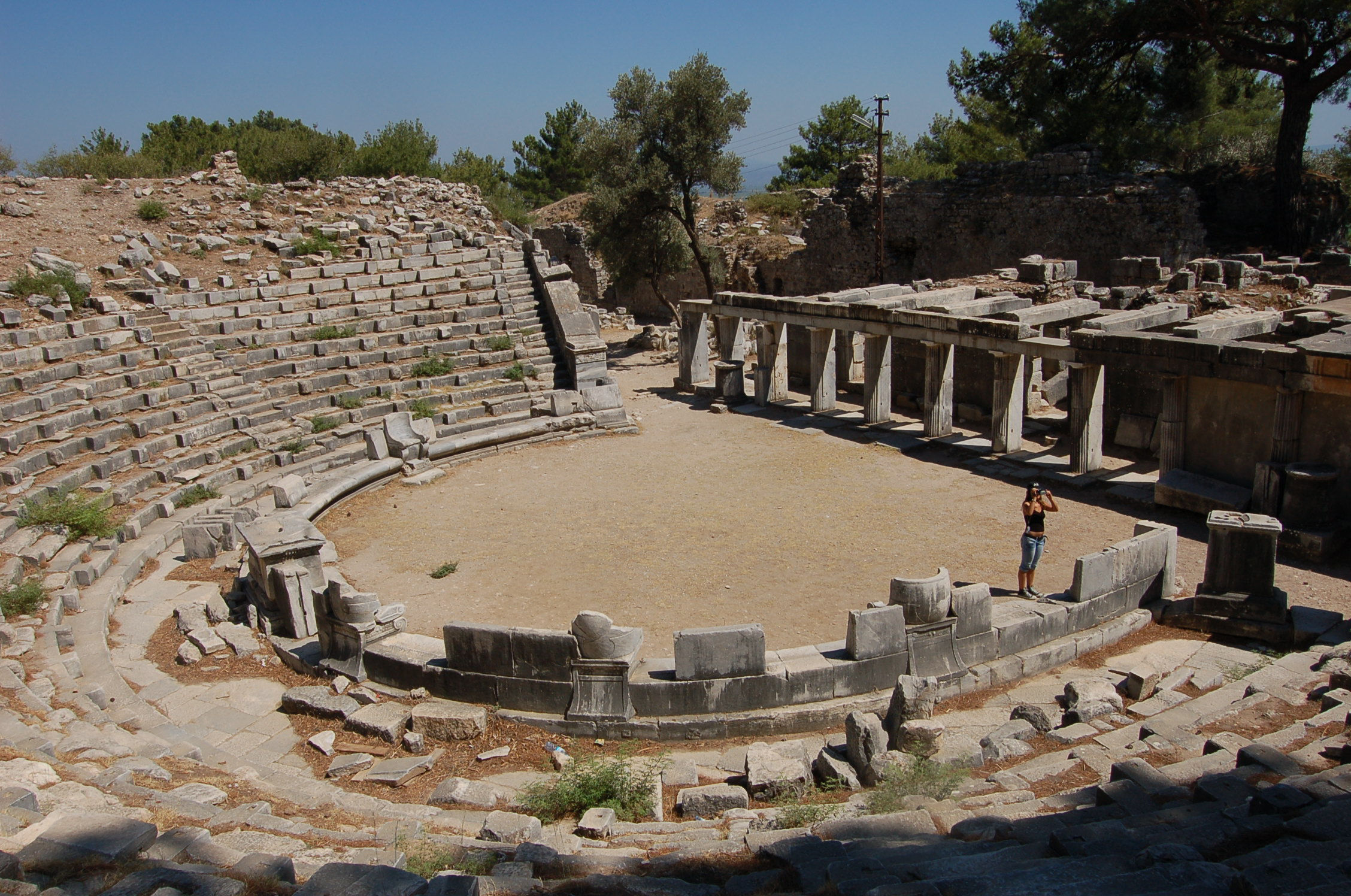
Priene

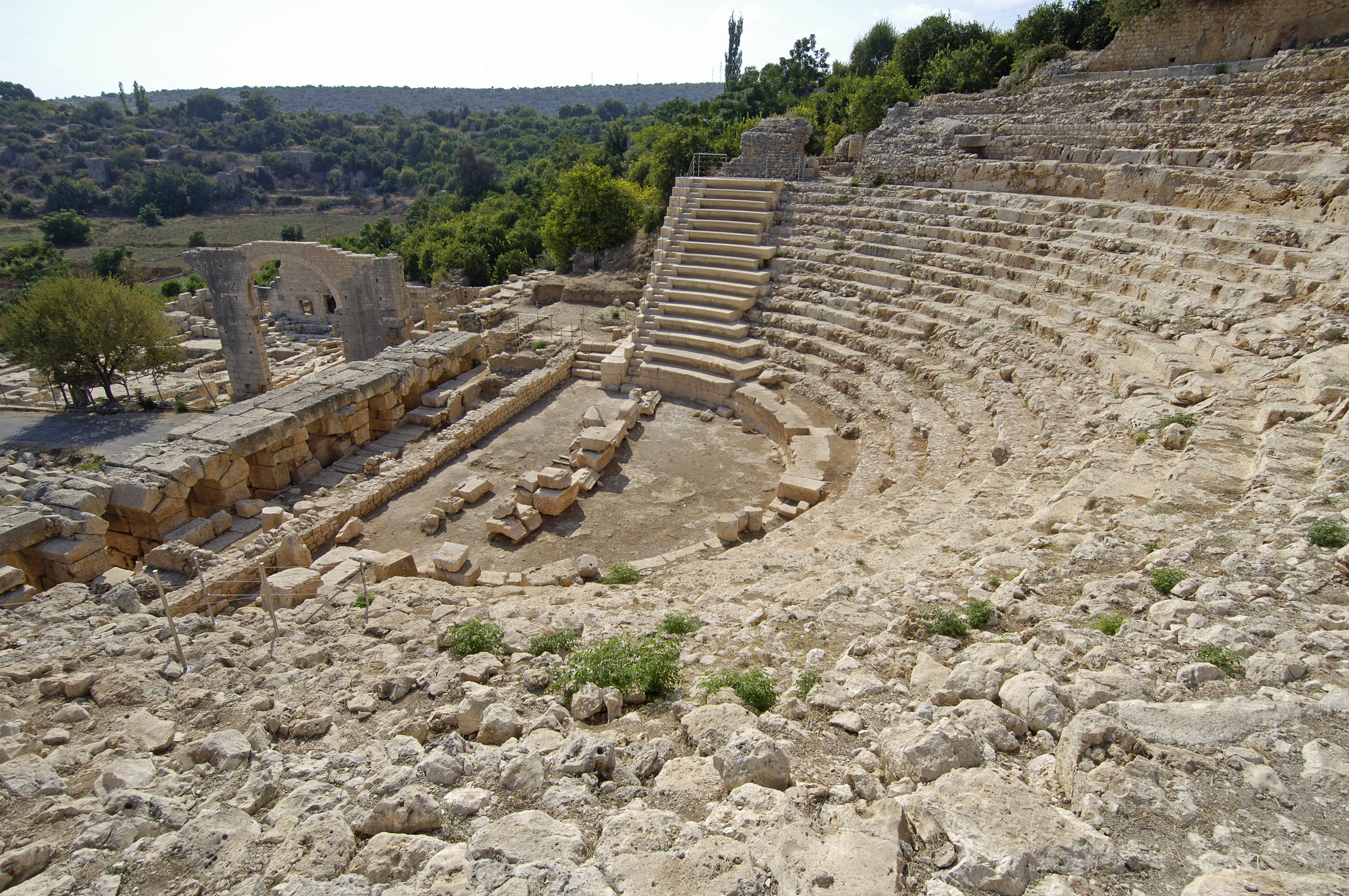
Elaiussa Sebaste

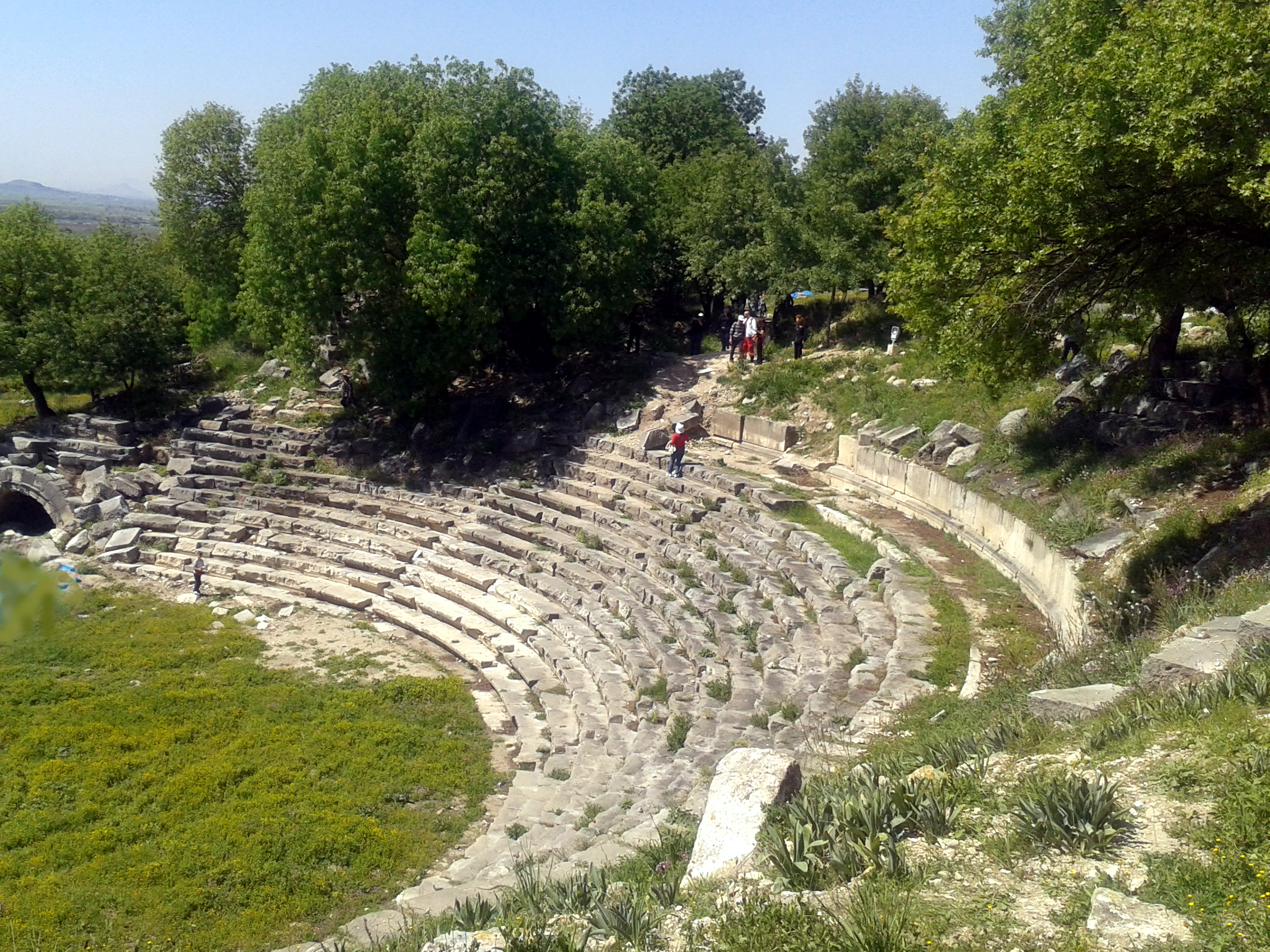
Castabala

Ancient city	Province	Period
Anazarbus	Adana Province	Roman
Apamea	Afyonkarahisar Province	Roman
Antiphellus	Antalya Province	Hellenistic
Arycanda	Antalya Province	Hellenistic
Aspendos	Antalya Province	Hellenistic
Myra	Antalya Province	Hellenistic
Patara	Antalya Province	Roman
Perga	Antalya Province	Hellenistic
Side	Antalya Province	Hellenistic
Termessos	Antalya Province	Hellenistic
Xanthos	Antalya Province	Roman
Aphrodisias	Aydın Province	Hellenistic
Miletus	Aydın Province	Hellenistic
Priene	Aydın Province	Hellenistic
Mastaura	Aydın Province	Roman
Cyzicus	Balıkesir Province	Roman
Kibyra	Burdur Province	Roman
Sagalassos	Burdur Province	Hellenistic
Nicaea	Bursa Province	Roman
Alexandria Troas	Çanakkale Province	Hellenistic
Assos	Çanakkale Province	Hellenistic
Troy	Çanakkale Province	Hellenistic
Hierapolis	Denizli Province	Hellenistic
Laodikeia	Denizli Province	Hellenistic
Ephesus	İzmir Province	Hellenistic
Kyme	İzmir Province	Hellenistic
Myrina (Mysia)	İzmir Province	Hellenistic
Phocaea	İzmir Province	Hellenistic
Pergamon	İzmir Province	Roman
Pitane	İzmir Province	Hellenistic
Aizanoi	Kütahya Province	Roman
Aigai	Manisa Province	Hellenistic
Sardis	Manisa Province	Hellenistic
Anemurium	Mersin Province	Roman
Diokaesareia	Mersin Province	Roman
Elaiussa Sebaste	Mersin Province	Roman
Halikarnas	Muğla Province	Hellenistic
Knidos	Muğla Province	Hellenistic
Letoon	Muğla Province	Hellenistic
Pinara	Muğla Province	Hellenistic
Stratonicea	Muğla Province	Hellenistic
Telmessus	Muğla Province	Hellenistic
Castabala	Osmaniye Province	Roman
