= Aydın Adnan Menderes University =

Public university in Aydın, Turkey

- Aydın Adnan Menderes Üniversitesi
- Former name: Adnan Menderes University
- Type: Public
- Established: 1992; 34 years ago
- Rector: Bülent Kent
- Location: Aydın, Turkey; 37.8547°N 27.8547°E
- Campus: Urban
- Website: www.adu.edu.tr

University rankings

Regional – Overall
- QS Emerging Europe and Central Asia: 301-350 (2022)

Aydın Adnan Menderes University (In Turkish: Aydın Adnan Menderes Üniversitesi) is a state university founded in Aydın, Turkey in 1992. The name of the university is derived from Adnan Menderes, former Prime Minister of Turkey.

The university began its education in Efeler and Nazilli in 1992 with five faculties (Science-Literature, Nazilli School of Economics and Administrative Sciences, Medicine, Veterinary, and Agriculture faculties), three institutes, the School of Tourism and Hotel Management, and the School of Vocational Studies in Söke. Currently, the university has 21 faculties, 3 institutes, a State Conservatory, 19 Vocational Schools, and 36 Application and Research Centers.

Today, it continues its activities across 17 different locations including Efeler, Çakmar, Işıklı, İsabeyli, Didim, Nazilli, Çine, Karacasu, Kuşadası, Atça, Sultanhisar, Yenipazar, Söke, Davutlar, Bozdoğan, Köşk, and Buharkent.

In the 2023–2024 academic year, a total of 48,414 students were enrolled, including 18,717 associate degree, 26,100 undergraduate, 2,930 master's, and 667 doctoral students.

As of 2024, the university employed a total of 1,829 academic staff, including 455 professors, 250 associate professors, 376 assistant professors, 394 lecturers, and 354 research assistants.

== Units ==
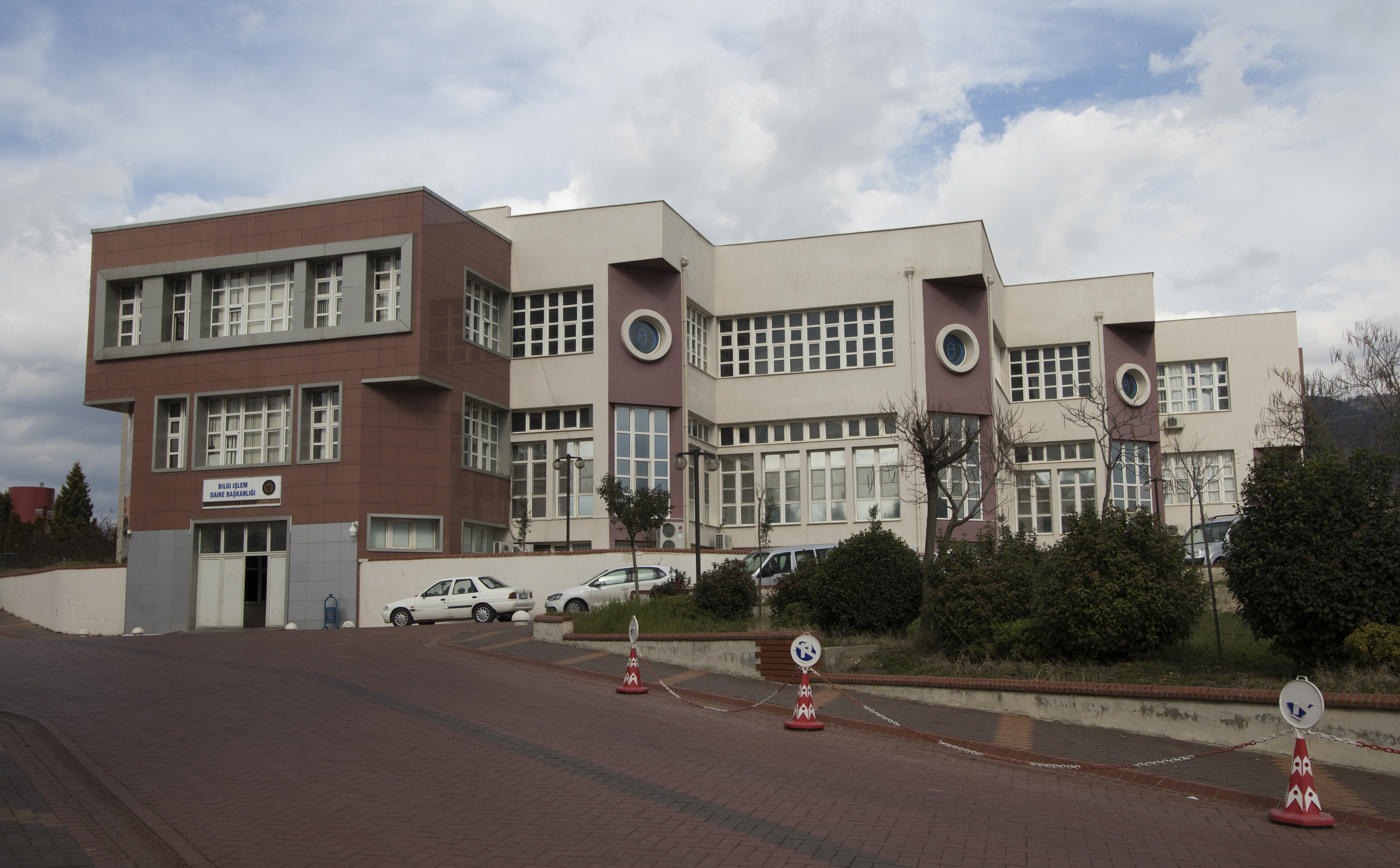
University Library

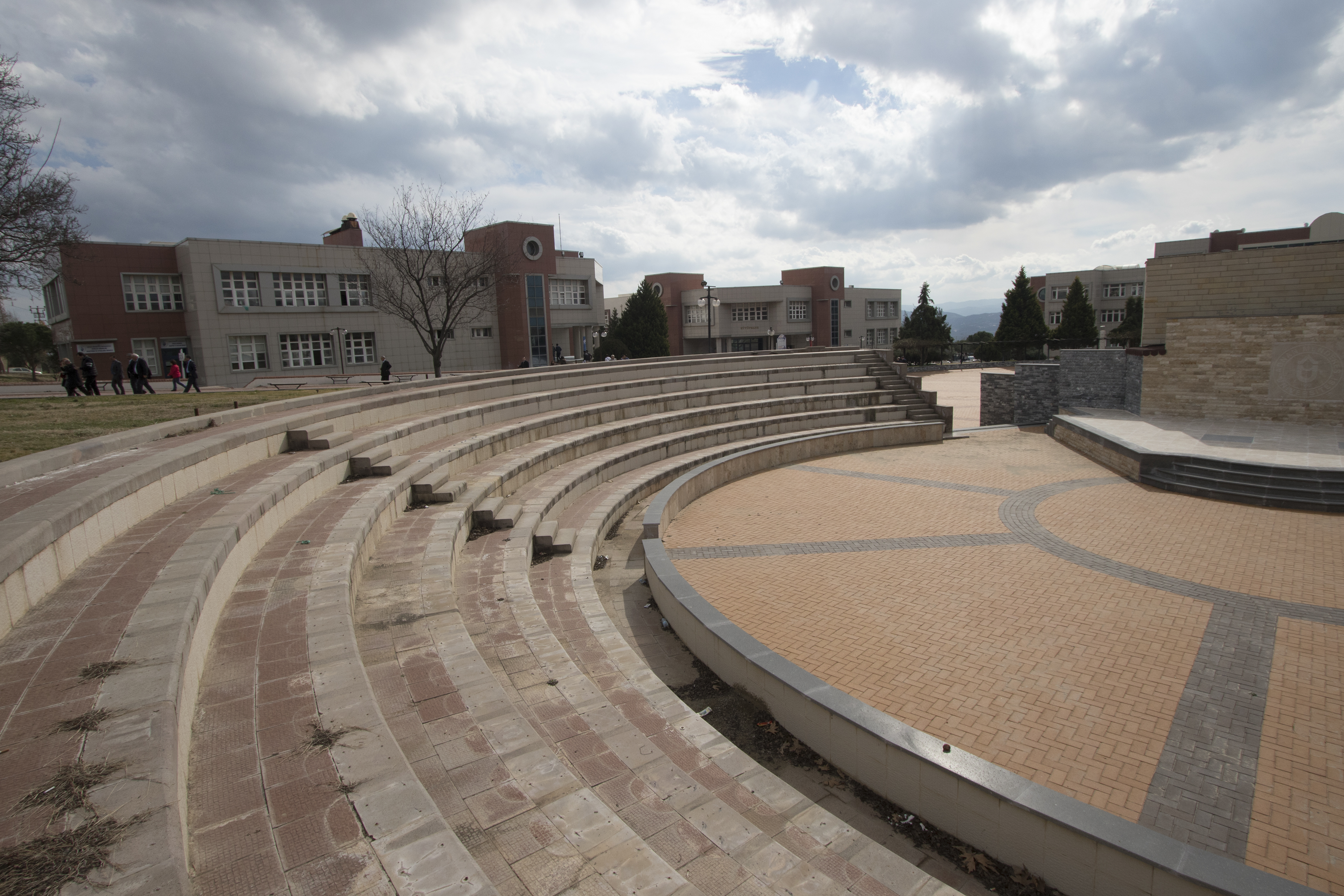
Tralleis Amphitheater

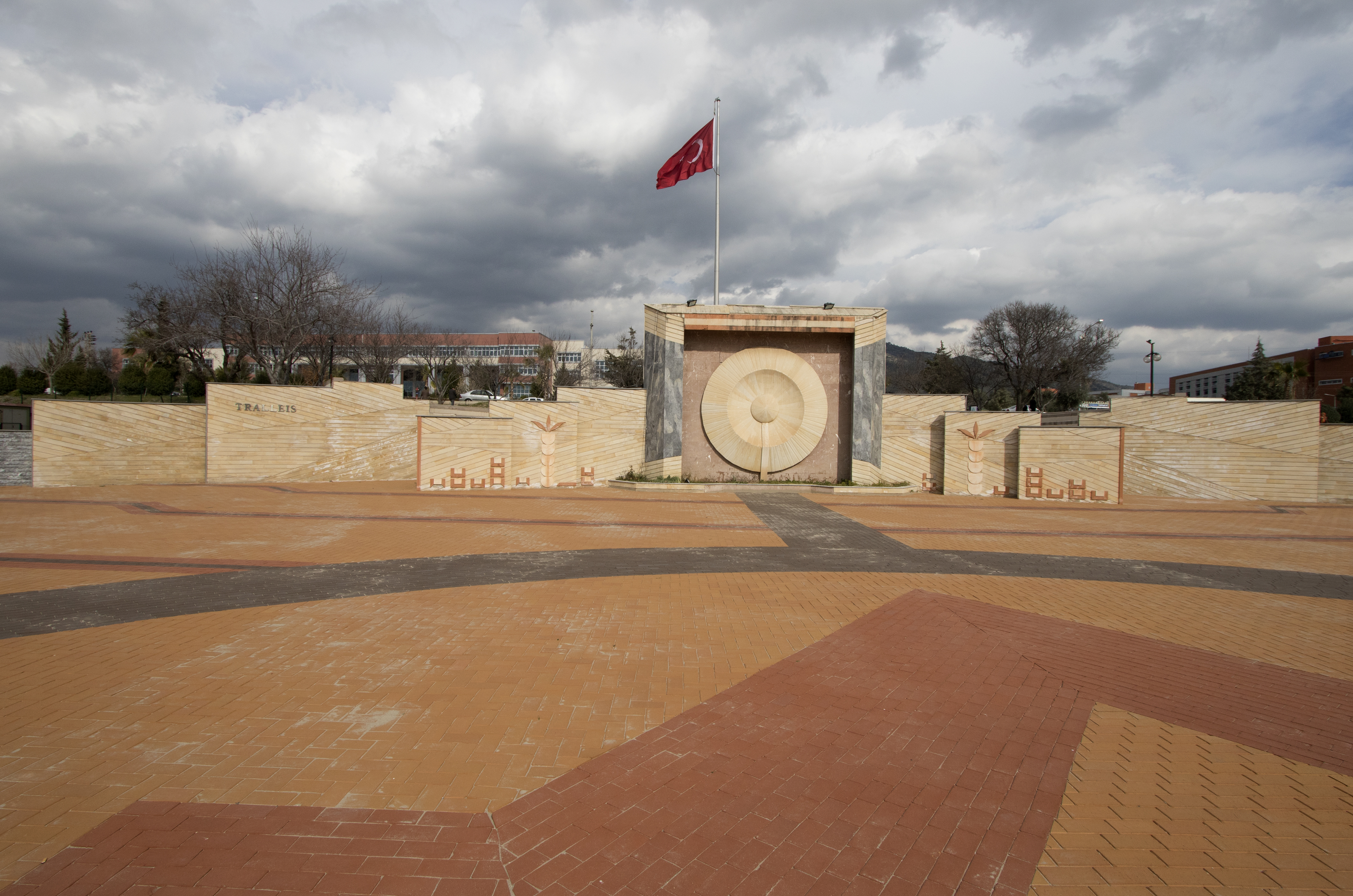
Tralleis Amphitheater

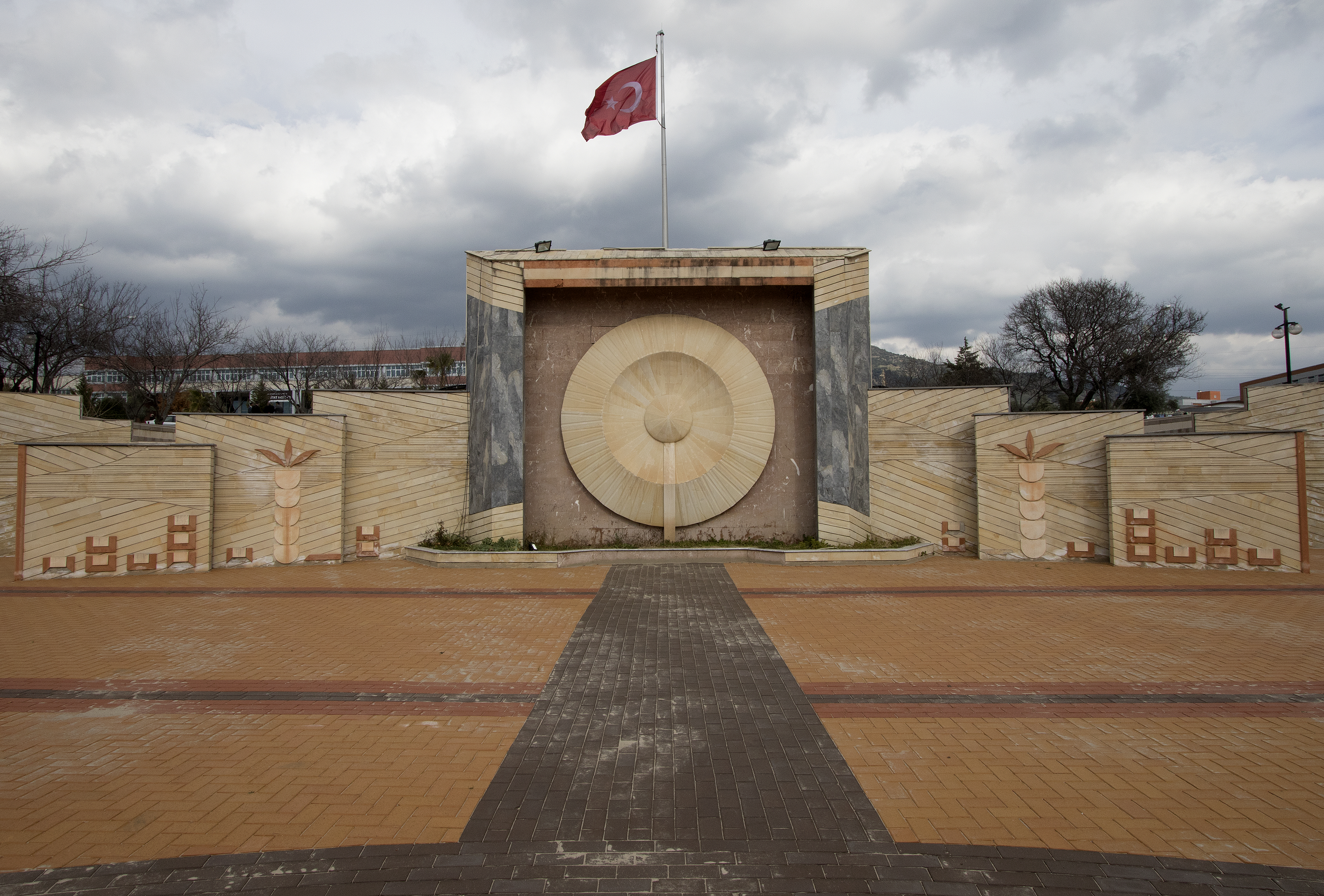
Tralleis Amphitheater

=== Faculties ===
- Tourism Faculty
- Medical School
- Faculty of Education
- Faculty of Arts and Sciences
- Nazilli Faculty of Economics and Administrative Sciences
- Faculty of veterinary medicine
- Faculty of Agriculture
- Communication faculty
- Engineering faculty
- Aydın Faculty of Economics
- Faculty of Dentistry
- Söke Business Administration Faculty
- Soke Architecture Faculty
- Kuşadası Maritime Faculty
- Faculty of Nursing
- Faculty of Health Sciences

=== Institutes ===
- Institute of Science and Technology
- Health Sciences Institute
- Institute of Social Sciences

=== Colleges ===
- High school of Physical Education and Sports
- Nazilli School of Applied Science
- Söke Health School
- School of Foreign Languages
- Nazilli State Conservatory

=== Vocational Schools ===
- Atça Vocational School
- Aydın Vocational School
- Aydin Health Services Vocational School
- Bozdoğan Vocational School
- Çine Vocational School
- Didim Vocational School
- Karacasu Vocational School
- Kuyucak Vocational School
- Cooperative Vocational School
- Nazilli Vocational School
- Nazilli Health Services Vocational School
- Söke Vocational School
- Söke Health Services Vocational School
- Sultanhisar Vocational School
- Yenipazar Vocational School
- Buharkent Vocational School

== See also ==
- Adnan Menderes
- List of universities in Turkey
