= Sümerbank =

- Traded as: BİST: SUMER; BİST: OYBNK; BİST: TNBNK

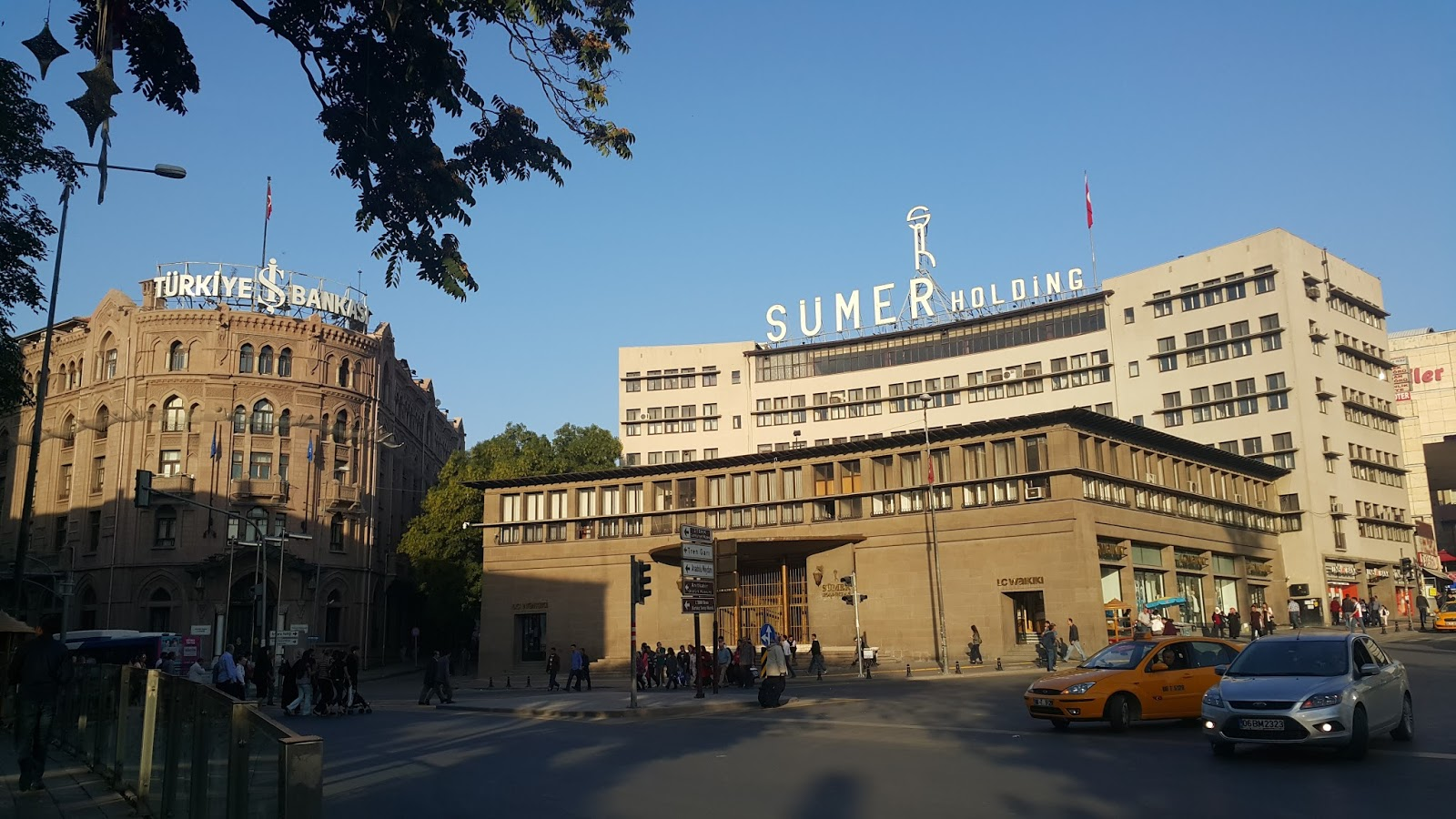
Sümerbank in Ankara

Sümerbank was a Turkish bank and industrial holding company established in 1933 and originally owned by the Turkish state, now part of Oyak Bank. On 11 January 2002, Oyak Bank acquired Sümerbank and the combined bank is now known under the Oyak Bank name.

== History ==
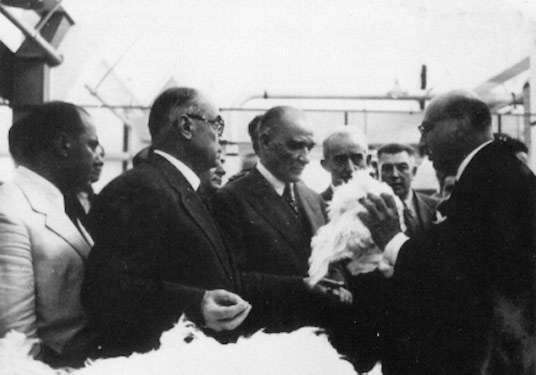
Atatürk (center) accompanied by Bayar (to his left) and İnönü (to his right) at the Sümerbank Textile Factory in Nazilli, October 9, 1937.

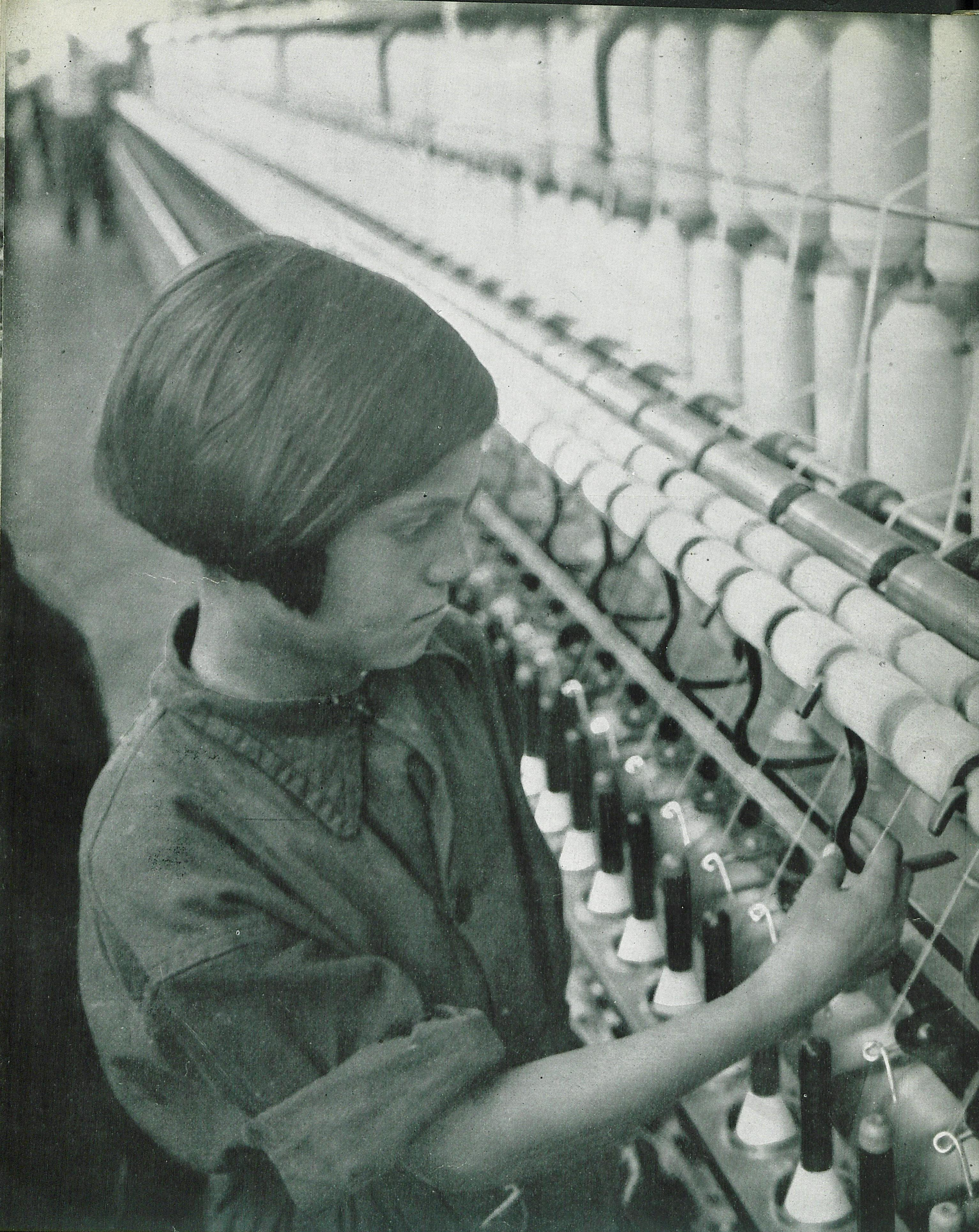
A Sümerbank factory in 1937

Sümerbank Textile Factory was established in 1933 as a state owned bank for funding the construction of textile factories and the development of the textile industry in Turkey. A year earlier, in 1932, President Mustafa Kemal Atatürk and Prime Minister İsmet İnönü had secured a foreign credit loan worth 8.5 million Turkish liras from the Soviet Union (which offered the lowest interest rates to Turkey in that period) for the construction of Sümerbank's first textile factory in Kayseri. The first textile production plant in Kayseri was opened in September 1935.

The Soviet Union also provided credit loans and technical assistance for Turkey's First Five-Year Industrial Plan (Birinci Beş Yıllık Sanayi Planı, 1934–1938) which was partially influenced by the First Five-Year Economic Plan (1928–1932) of the Soviet Union. Economists and planning experts from the Soviet Union and the United States were invited to Turkey and prepared reports on how the country should use its natural resources efficiently for industrialization, and how to optimally distribute the factories and industrial plants across the country's geographical regions.

Sümerbank's textile plants produced the highest quality textiles in Turkey during the early decades of the republic, for relatively cheap prices, which enabled the citizens with low levels of income to afford decent clothing. After 11 years of consecutive wars between 1911 and 1922, namely the Italo-Turkish War (1911–1912), Balkan Wars (1912–1913), First World War (1914–1918) and the Turkish War of Independence (1919–1923), the Turkish economy was devastated and many Turks were poor. Starting from 1929, the global Great Depression, which lasted until the end of the Second World War in 1945, also badly hit the rapidly growing (since 1923) but still weak and fragile Turkish economy. Due to the lack of a strong private sector in Turkey in those years, large scale investments by the government were necessary for initiating the industrialization efforts in the country.

Sümerbank was the cornerstone of Atatürk's industrial revolution in Turkey. Sümerbank's factories and plants, which represented the state-led industrialization in the Turkish textile sector for decades, were gradually closed and sold starting from 2002, when Oyak Bank acquired Sümerbank and decided to terminate the company's operations in this field, due to the highly developed private sector and saturated market in the Turkish textile industry by the early 2000s.

== See also ==
- Sümerbank Branch
- Atatürk's reforms
- Kemalist ideology
