= Bülent Kent =

Turkish academic

Rector of Aydın Adnan Menderes University
- Incumbent
- Assumed office March 14, 2023
- Preceded by: Osman Selçuk Aldemir

Personal details
- Born: February 8, 1972 (age 54) Afyonkarahisar, Turkey
- Education: Istanbul University; University of Potsdam; Free University of Berlin

Bülent Kent (born February 8, 1972) is a Turkish academic and jurist who has served as the Rector of Aydın Adnan Menderes University since 2023.

== Life and education ==
Born in 1972 in Dinar, Afyonkarahisar, Kent graduated from the Faculty of Law at Istanbul University in 1996. After obtaining his master's degree at University of Potsdam in Germany in 2001, he received his doctorate in law from Free University of Berlin in 2005.

In 2018, he was appointed as a professor of administrative law and administrative trial law at the Faculty of Law, Social Sciences University of Ankara. In 2023, Kent was elected to the executive board of educational scholarships and activity support by the Scientific and Technological Research Council of Turkey.
