= Sümer, Nazilli =

Village in Turkey

Sümer
- Neighbourhood
- Location within Turkey Location within Turkey Aegean
- Coordinates: 37°53′56″N 28°19′23″E
- Country: Turkey
- Province: Aydın
- District: Nazilli
- Population (2024): 2,975
- Time zone: UTC+3 (TRT)

Sümer is a neighbourhood in the municipality and district of Nazilli, Aydın Province, Turkey. Its population is 2,975 (2024).
