= Yeşil, Nazilli =

Village in Turkey

Yeşil
- Neighbourhood
- Location in Turkey Yeşil (Turkey Aegean)
- Coordinates: 37°55′12″N 28°20′34″E
- Country: Turkey
- Province: Aydın
- District: Nazilli
- Population (2024): 16,086
- Time zone: UTC+3 (TRT)

Yeşil is a neighbourhood in the municipality and district of Nazilli, Aydın Province, Turkey. Its population is 16,086 (2024).
