= Bereketli, Nazilli =

Bereketli
- Neighbourhood
- Location in Turkey Bereketli (Turkey Aegean)
- Coordinates: 37.9042°N 28.4065°E
- Country: Turkey
- Province: Aydın
- District: Nazilli
- Population (2022): 482
- Time zone: UTC+3 (TRT)

Bereketli is a neighbourhood in the municipality and district of Nazilli, Aydın Province, Turkey. Its population is 482 (2022).
