= Sümerbank Branch =

Overview
- Headquarters: Nazilli
- Reporting mark: Sümerbank
- Locale: Nazilli, Turkey
- Dates of operation: 1937–1980
- Successor: TCDD

Technical
- Track gauge: 1,435 mm (4 ft 8 1/2 in)
- Length: 2.37 km (1.47 mi)

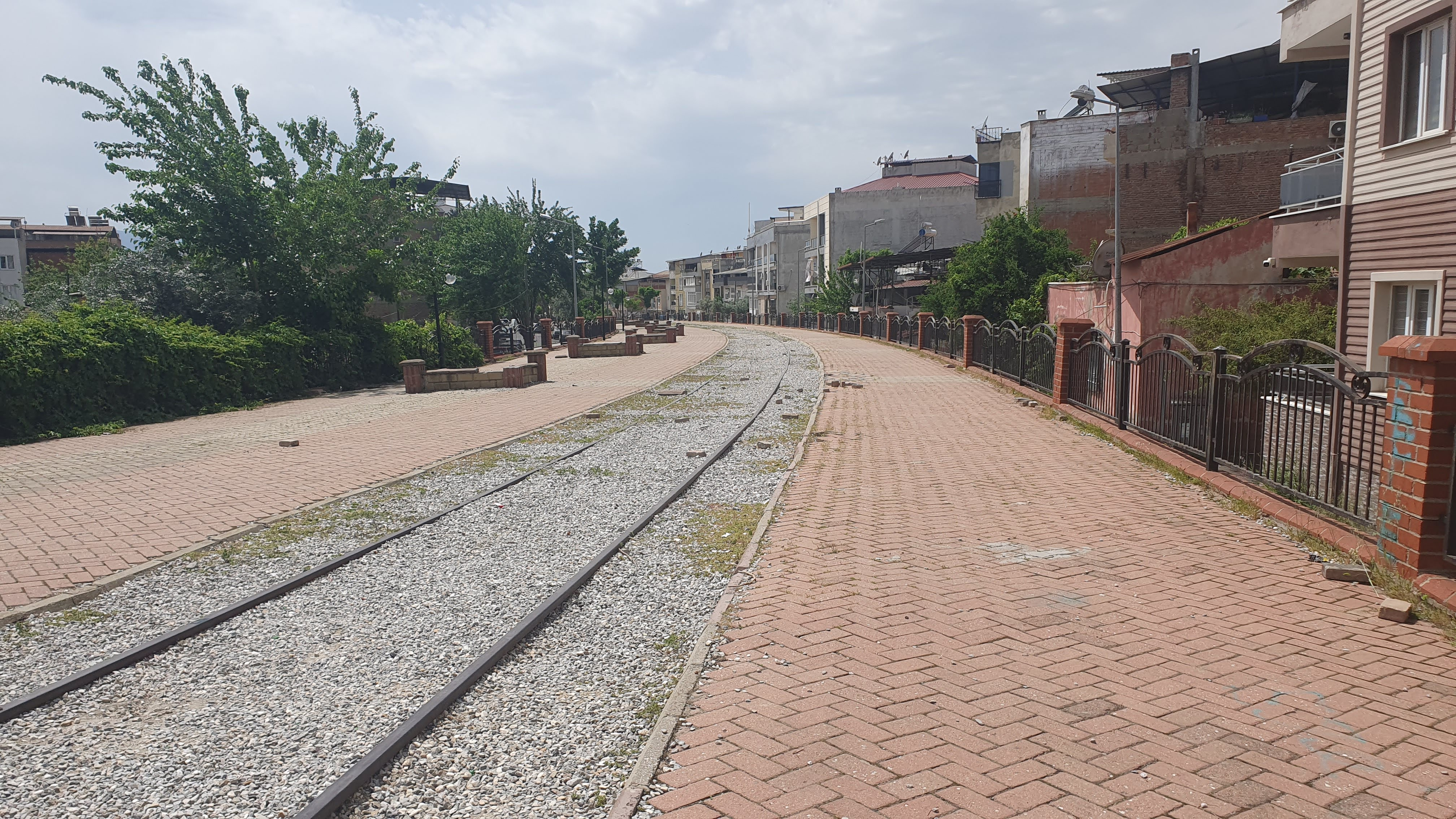

The Sümerbank Branch locally referred to as the Gıdıgıdı as in Chug chug (Turkish: Sümerbank Nazilli Banliyösu), was a short line railway operating in Nazilli, Turkey. The railway was built in 1937 to shuttle workers at the Sümerbank factory to the Nazilli railway station. Sümerbank owned and operated the railway, using a Ruston shunting engine and a single railcar from the Oriental Railway Company.

The railway was opened along with the Sümerbank factory itself. President Mustafa Kemal Atatürk, along with Prime Minister İsmet İnönü and Celal Bayar rode into Nazilli on a TCDD MAN 21-25 railbus from İzmir to open the factory. Their railcar rode into the factory on the shuttle line.
