= Kocakesik, Nazilli =

Kocakesik
- Neighbourhood
- Location in Turkey Kocakesik (Turkey Aegean)
- Coordinates: 37°58′N 28°23′E
- Country: Turkey
- Province: Aydın
- District: Nazilli
- Population (2022): 246
- Time zone: UTC+3 (TRT)

Kocakesik is a neighbourhood in the municipality and district of Nazilli, Aydın Province, Turkey. Its population is 246 (2022).
