= Hisarcık, Nazilli =

Hisarcık
- Neighbourhood
- Location in Turkey Hisarcık (Turkey Aegean)
- Coordinates: 38.0333°N 28.3833°E
- Country: Turkey
- Province: Aydın
- District: Nazilli
- Population (2022): 523
- Time zone: UTC+3 (TRT)

Hisarcık is a neighbourhood in the municipality and district of Nazilli, Aydın Province, Turkey. Its population is 523 (2022).
