= Yeşilyurt, Nazilli =

Village in Turkey

Yeşilyurt
- Neighbourhood
- Location in Turkey Yeşilyurt (Turkey Aegean)
- Coordinates: 37°54′37″N 28°20′31″E
- Country: Turkey
- Province: Aydın
- District: Nazilli
- Population (2024): 2,664
- Time zone: UTC+3 (TRT)

Yeşilyurt is a neighbourhood in the municipality and district of Nazilli, Aydın Province, Turkey. Its population is 2,664 (2024).
