= Dumlupınar, Nazilli =

Village in Turkey

Dumlupınar
- Neighbourhood
- Location in Turkey Dumlupınar (Turkey Aegean)
- Coordinates: 37°54′10″N 28°19′21″E
- Country: Turkey
- Province: Aydın
- District: Nazilli
- Population (2024): 1,331
- Time zone: UTC+3 (TRT)

Dumlupınar is a neighbourhood in the municipality and district of Nazilli, Aydın Province, Turkey. Its population is 1,331 (2024).
