= Yenisanayi, Nazilli =

Village in Turkey

Yenisanayi
- Neighbourhood
- Location in Turkey Yenisanayi (Turkey Aegean)
- Coordinates: 37°54′05″N 28°18′39″E
- Country: Turkey
- Province: Aydın
- District: Nazilli
- Population (2024): 1,244
- Time zone: UTC+3 (TRT)

Yenisanayi is a neighbourhood in the municipality and district of Nazilli, Aydın Province, Turkey. Its population is 1,244 (2024).
