= Pirlibey, Nazilli =

Pirlibey
- Neighbourhood
- Location in Turkey Pirlibey (Turkey Aegean)
- Coordinates: 37°52′N 28°26′E
- Country: Turkey
- Province: Aydın
- District: Nazilli
- Population (2022): 1,043
- Time zone: UTC+3 (TRT)

Pirlibey is a neighbourhood of the municipality and district of Nazilli, Aydın Province, Turkey. Its population is 1,043 (2022). Before the 2013 reorganisation, it was a town (belde).
