= Dualar, Nazilli =

Dualar
- Neighbourhood
- Location in Turkey Dualar (Turkey Aegean)
- Coordinates: 37°51′18″N 28°24′36″E
- Country: Turkey
- Province: Aydın
- District: Nazilli
- Population (2022): 137
- Time zone: UTC+3 (TRT)

Dualar is a neighbourhood in the municipality and district of Nazilli, Aydın Province, Turkey. Its population is 137 (2022).
