= Beğerli, Nazilli =

Beğerli
- Neighbourhood
- Location in Turkey Beğerli (Turkey Aegean)
- Coordinates: 37°45′N 28°23′E
- Country: Turkey
- Province: Aydın
- District: Nazilli
- Population (2022): 606
- Time zone: UTC+3 (TRT)

Beğerli is a neighbourhood in the municipality and district of Nazilli, Aydın Province, Turkey. Its population is 606 (2022).
