= Fatih Takmaklı =

Turkish author of photography category (born 1983)

Fatih TAKMAKLI
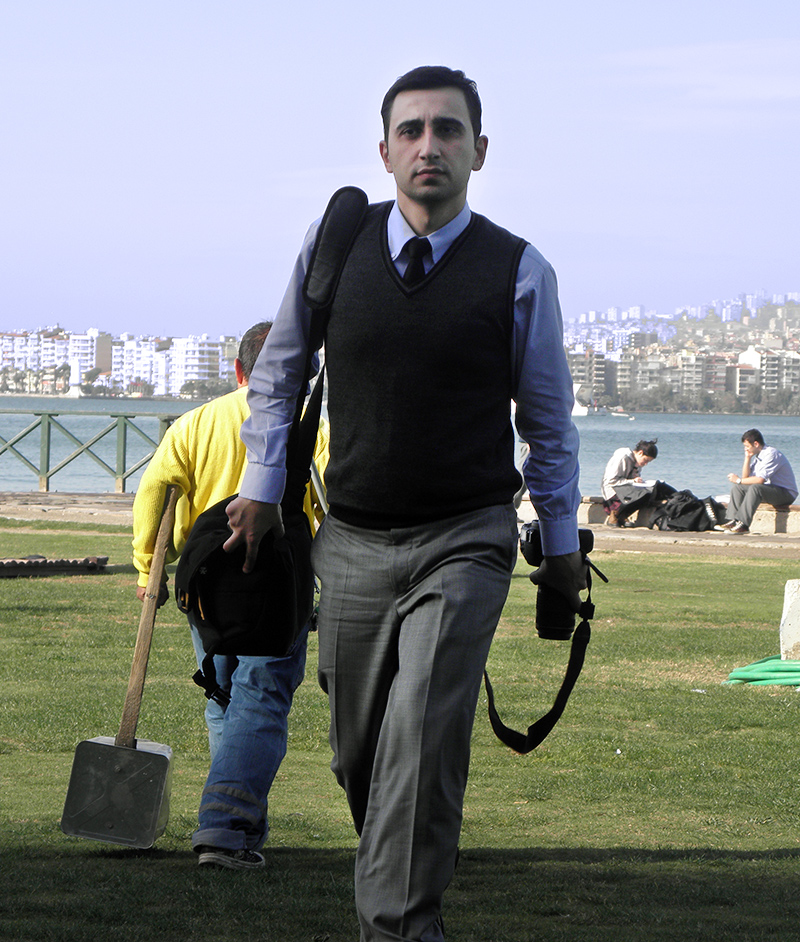
- 2015
- Born: September 5, 1983; Nazilli, Turkey
- Education: B.A., political science, international studies, and economy; Masters, management
- Occupation: Author
- Writing career
- Genres: Photography, Poetry
- Website: suustunde.com

Fatih TAKMAKLI (born September 5, 1983) is a Turkish author of photography category. He was president of the Turkish Intercultural Club while studying in the Loyola University Chicago in America and taught Turkish culture to Americans. The Club granted an award named Damen Award, a special award on behalf of university founder Arnold Damen. During his studies in the US, he also wrote a poetry book named The Love of the Rose in 2007. He also wrote and published a collection of book series named World Ship Collection starting by Modern Cruise Ships from 1931 to 2008 (World Ship Collection I). The second book of his World Ship Collection is Ferries of the World. The following third and fourth books are Modern Turkish Ships and Tall Ships: The Ladies of the Seas.

== Early life and career ==
Takmakli was born in Nazilli, Aydın, Turkey and was sent to the US by his family for high school education in St. Patrick High School. Beginning from his young ages, he started photographing vessels and cruises as a hobby. He studied in the Loyola University Chicago and graduated by 3 main subjects which are Social Science, International Relations, and Economy. He took his master's degree on the subject of management from DePaul University and had the decision of going back to Turkey during his PhD.

His interest in photography had started with a camera, which was gifted him by his cousins. An album of his photography of vessels, travel agency brochures and clippings of ships in his backpack was the base foundation of his books.

During his studies in America, he wrote the variety of books. The first one was, The Love of the Rose, an English poetry book. Takmakli has 4 series of books named World Ship Collection. Modern Cruise Ships from 1931 to 2008 (World Ship Collection I) contains over 130 photographs of cruise ships. 2nd book of the World Ship Collection is Ferries of the World published in 2008, contains 128 photographs of Washington State Ferries, UkrFerry Ferryboats, Turkish Maritime Lines, Staten Island Ferry, Lake Michigan Ferry, İstanbul Sea Bus Line, G.A. Ferries, Deniz Lines. In 2009, 3rd book of the series released; named Modern Turkish Ships, contains over 135 photographs. The last one appeared as, Tall Ships, The Ladies of the Seas contains quite a few photographs from Tall Ships Challenge arranged in Philadelphia, Tacoma and Norfolk.

In his professional life, Takmakli is currently working as the Vice General Director of Finance and Human Resources in a Turkish firm.

== Writings ==
1. Modern Cruise Ships from 1931 to 2008 (2008) (English)
2. Tall Ships: The Ladies of the Seas (2009) (English)
3. Modern Turkish Ships (2009) English)
4. The Love of the Rose (2011) (English)
5. Ferries of the World (2008) (English)
6. Su Üstünde (Afloat) - First Cover (2016) (Turkish)

== Su Üstünde (Afloat) - First Cover (2016)' ==
First Cover of Su Üstünde (Afloat) contains almost 1350 photographs, information of 100 ship company, technical information of 412 cruise ships and history from 15 countries and 60 harbors. Takmakli took every picture in his book himself and Su Üstünde (Afloat) is considered as an archive. Meaning of "Su Üstünde" is referring to the word of "afloat" in English and means "on board a ship; at sea".

Information Title	Information
Page Number	439
Publication Year	2016
Date of Issue	2016-01
Language	Turkish
Publisher	Denizler

== Personal life ==
After starting his professional working life, Takmakli got married and is the father to one daughter. Especially he stated in his last book, that he devoted Su Üstünde (Afloat) to his daughter.
