= Arslanlı, Nazilli =

Village in Turkey

Arslanlı
- Neighbourhood
- Location in Turkey Arslanlı (Turkey Aegean)
- Coordinates: 37°55′50″N 28°22′15″E
- Country: Turkey
- Province: Aydın
- District: Nazilli
- Population (2024): 1,803
- Time zone: UTC+3 (TRT)

Arslanlı is a neighbourhood in the municipality and district of Nazilli, Aydın Province, Turkey. Its population is 1,803 (2024).
