= İstiklal, Nazilli =

Village in Turkey

İstiklal
- Neighbourhood
- Location in Turkey İstiklal (Turkey Aegean)
- Coordinates: 37°54′26″N 28°18′08″E
- Country: Turkey
- Province: Aydın
- District: Nazilli
- Population (2024): 2,152
- Time zone: UTC+3 (TRT)

İstiklal is a neighbourhood in the municipality and district of Nazilli, Aydın Province, Turkey. Its population is 2,152 (2024).
