= Zafer, Nazilli =

Village in Turkey

Zafer
- Neighbourhood
- Location in Turkey Zafer (Turkey Aegean)
- Coordinates: 37°54′56″N 28°18′26″E
- Country: Turkey
- Province: Aydın
- District: Nazilli
- Population (2024): 15,514
- Time zone: UTC+3 (TRT)

Zafer is a neighbourhood in the municipality and district of Nazilli, Aydın Province, Turkey. Its population is 15,514 (2024).
