= Kızıldere, Nazilli =

Kızıldere
- Neighbourhood
- Country: Turkey
- Province: Aydın
- District: Nazilli
- Population (2022): 350
- Time zone: UTC+3 (TRT)

Kızıldere is a neighbourhood in the municipality and district of Nazilli, Aydın Province, Turkey. Its population is 350 (2022).
