= Dallıca, Nazilli =

Dallıca
- Neighbourhood
- Location in Turkey Dallıca (Turkey Aegean)
- Coordinates: 37°54′22″N 28°17′02″E
- Country: Turkey
- Province: Aydın
- District: Nazilli
- Population (2022): 3,032
- Time zone: UTC+3 (TRT)

Dallıca is a neighbourhood in the municipality and district of Nazilli, Aydın Province, Turkey. Its population is 3,032 (2022).
