= Şimşelli, Nazilli =

Şimşelli
- Neighbourhood
- Location in Turkey Şimşelli (Turkey Aegean)
- Coordinates: 38°00′N 28°21′E
- Country: Turkey
- Province: Aydın
- District: Nazilli
- Population (2022): 193
- Time zone: UTC+3 (TRT)

Şimşelli is a neighbourhood in the municipality and district of Nazilli, Aydın Province, Turkey. Its population is 193 (2022).
