= Mastaura (Lycia) =

Town in ancient Lycia

Coordinates: 36°20′05″N 29°48′54″E

Mastaura (Ancient Greek: Μάσταυρα) was a town in ancient Lycia.

It may have been located at present-day Dereağzı, some 25 km northwest of Myra, which is therefore not to be confused with Dereağzı, Nazilli or Dereağzı, İncirliova.

Dereağzı had a large domed church made of brick, which may have been the cathedral of Mastaura.

== Bishopric ==
The bishopric of Mastaura in Lycia is mentioned in Notitiae Episcopatuum of the 7th and 10th centuries as having first rank among the suffragans of the metropolitan see of Myra.

No bishop of the see is mentioned by name in extant documents, unless Baanes, who was at the Photian Council of Constantinople (879) was bishop not of Mastaura in Asia but of Mastaura in Lycia.

No longer a residential bishopric, Mastaura in Lycia is today listed by the Catholic Church as a titular see.
