= Toygar, Nazilli =

Toygar
- Neighbourhood
- Location in Turkey Toygar (Turkey Aegean)
- Coordinates: 37°49′44″N 28°21′41″E
- Country: Turkey
- Province: Aydın
- District: Nazilli
- Population (2022): 240
- Time zone: UTC+3 (TRT)

Toygar is a neighbourhood in the municipality and district of Nazilli, Aydın Province, Turkey. Its population is 240 (2022).
