= Turan, Nazilli =

Village in Turkey

Turan
- Neighbourhood
- Location in Turkey Turan (Turkey Aegean)
- Coordinates: 37°55′00″N 28°19′56″E
- Country: Turkey
- Province: Aydın
- District: Nazilli
- Population (2024): 5,889
- Time zone: UTC+3 (TRT)

Turan is a neighbourhood in the municipality and district of Nazilli, Aydın Province, Turkey. Its population is 5,889 (2024).
