= Çapahasan, Nazilli =

Village in Turkey

Çapahasan
- Neighbourhood
- Location in Turkey Çapahasan (Turkey Aegean)
- Coordinates: 37°54′06″N 28°19′40″E
- Country: Turkey
- Province: Aydın
- District: Nazilli
- Population (2024): 3,415
- Time zone: UTC+3 (TRT)

Çapahasan is a neighbourhood in the municipality and district of Nazilli, Aydın Province, Turkey. Its population is 3,415 (2024).
