= Yıldıztepe, Nazilli =

Village in Turkey

Yıldıztepe
- Neighbourhood
- Location in Turkey Yıldıztepe (Turkey Aegean)
- Coordinates: 37°55′24″N 28°18′49″E
- Country: Turkey
- Province: Aydın
- District: Nazilli
- Population (2024): 19,656
- Time zone: UTC+3 (TRT)

Yıldıztepe is a neighbourhood in the municipality and district of Nazilli, Aydın Province, Turkey. Its population is 19,656 (2024).
