= Kardeşköy, Nazilli =

Kardeşköy
- Neighbourhood
- Country: Turkey
- Province: Aydın
- District: Nazilli
- Population (2022): 145
- Time zone: UTC+3 (TRT)

Kardeşköy is a neighbourhood in the municipality and district of Nazilli, Aydın Province, Turkey. Its population is 145 (2022).
