= Ketenova, Nazilli =

Ketenova
- Neighbourhood
- Location in Turkey Ketenova (Turkey Aegean)
- Coordinates: 38°02′38″N 28°27′0″E
- Country: Turkey
- Province: Aydın
- District: Nazilli
- Population (2022): 208
- Time zone: UTC+3 (TRT)

Ketenova is a neighbourhood in the municipality and district of Nazilli, Aydın Province, Turkey. Its population is 208 (2022).
