= Karaçay, Nazilli =

Village in Turkey

Karaçay
- Neighbourhood
- Location in Turkey Karaçay (Turkey Aegean)
- Coordinates: 37°54′33″N 28°19′18″E
- Country: Turkey
- Province: Aydın
- District: Nazilli
- Population (2024): 3,341
- Time zone: UTC+3 (TRT)

Karaçay is a neighbourhood in the municipality and district of Nazilli, Aydın Province, Turkey. Its population is 3,341 (2024).
