= Yeni, Nazilli =

Village in Turkey

Yeni
- Neighbourhood
- Location in Turkey Yeni (Turkey Aegean)
- Coordinates: 37°54′44″N 28°19′00″E
- Country: Turkey
- Province: Aydın
- District: Nazilli
- Population (2024): 13,837
- Time zone: UTC+3 (TRT)

Yeni is a neighbourhood in the municipality and district of Nazilli, Aydın Province, Turkey. Its population is 13,837 (2024).
