= Aydoğdu, Nazilli =

Village in Turkey

Aydoğdu
- Neighbourhood
- Location in Turkey Aydoğdu (Turkey Aegean)
- Coordinates: 37°55′26″N 28°19′39″E
- Country: Turkey
- Province: Aydın
- District: Nazilli
- Population (2024): 6,260
- Time zone: UTC+3 (TRT)

Aydoğdu is a neighbourhood in the municipality and district of Nazilli, Aydın Province, Turkey. Its population is 6,260 (2024).
