= Aşağıyakacık, Nazilli =

Aşağıyakacık
- Neighbourhood
- Location in Turkey Aşağıyakacık (Turkey Aegean)
- Coordinates: 38°05′38″N 28°28′52″E
- Country: Turkey
- Province: Aydın
- District: Nazilli
- Population (2022): 1,397
- Time zone: UTC+3 (TRT)

Aşağıyakacık is a neighbourhood in the municipality and district of Nazilli, Aydın Province, Turkey. Its population is 1,397 (2022).
