= Haydarlı, Nazilli =

Haydarlı
- Neighbourhood
- Location in Turkey Haydarlı (Turkey Aegean)
- Coordinates: 38.0089°N 28.4533°E
- Country: Turkey
- Province: Aydın
- District: Nazilli
- Population (2022): 225
- Time zone: UTC+3 (TRT)

Haydarlı is a neighbourhood in the municipality and district of Nazilli, Aydın Province, Turkey. Its population is 225 (2022).
