= Harpasa =

City and bishopric in ancient Caria

Coordinates: 37.8058°N 28.3481°E

Harpaşa
- Arpasa
- Arpaz
- Location within Turkey
- Type: Settlement
- Periods: Arkaik Roma Hellenistik
- Cultures: Ancient Greek
- Location: Aydın, Turkey
- Region: Karya

History
- Built: 6th century BC

Site notes
- Condition: In ruins

Harpasa (Ancient Greek: Ἅρπασα) was a city and bishopric in ancient Caria in Roman Asia Minor (Asian Turkey), which only remains a Latin Catholic titular see.

== History ==
Little is known of the history of this town, situated on the east bank of the Harpasus, a tributary of the Mæander. It is mentioned by Ptolemy, by Stephanus Byzantius, by Hierocles, and by Pliny the Elder. According to Pliny, there was in the neighbourhood a rocking stone which could be set in motion by a finger-touch, whereas the force of the whole body could not move it. Stephanus of Byzantium states that the name derives from the Harpasus River (Άρπασος).

The Ancient Armenian village that resided in present-day Turkey hosts the ruined castle of Arpaz, in the district of Nazilli, nearly preserves the old name as does the Turkish form Harpaskale.

== Bishopric ==
It was important enough in the late Roman province of Caria (civil Diocese of Asia) to become a bishopric, a suffragan of the archbishopric of Stauropolis, in the sway of the Patriarchate of Constantinople. Harpasa appears in the lists of the Notitiae Episcopatuum until the 12th or 13th century.

Lequien's Oriens Christianus I, 907 mentions only four historically documented bishops :

- Phinias, who took part in the First Council of Ephesus in 431
- Zoticus, at the Council of Chalcedon 451, ? represented by the presbyter Philotheos
  - Irenæus, who adhered the heresy Monophysitism
- Leo, in Constantinople at the Council of Constantinople of 879–880 which rehabilitated Patriarch Photius I of Constantinople.

=== Titular see ===
The diocese was nominally restored (twentieth century?) by the Catholic Church as Titular bishopric of Harpasa (Latin) / Arpassa (Curiate Italian) / Harpasen(us) (Latin).

It is vacant since decades, having had the following incumbents, so far of the fitting Episcopal (lowest) rank, including an Eastern Catholic :

BIOS TO ELABORATE

- Joseph Pfluger (later Archbishop) (1911.11.30 – 1927.01.29)
- Blessed Bishop Pavel Peter Gojdic, Basilian Order of Saint Josaphat (O.S.B.M. – Byzantine Rite) (1927.03.07 – 1940.04.11)
- Bishop Stanislav Zela (1940.10.11 – 1969.12.06)

== Sources and external links ==
- GCatholic (former &) titular see
- Sophrone Pétridès, lemma 'Harpasa', in Herbermann, Charles, ed. (1913). "Harpasa". Catholic Encyclopedia. New York: Robert Appleton Company., vol. VII, New York 1910

Bibliography – ecclesiastical history

- Pius Bonifacius Gams, Series episcoporum Ecclesiae Catholicae, Leipzig 1931, p. 447
- Michel Lequien, Oriens christianus in quatuor Patriarchatus digestus, Paris 1740, vol. I, coll. 907–910
- Vincenzo Ruggiari, A historical Addendum to the episcopal Lists of Caria, in Revue des études byzantines, 1996, Volume 54, No. 54, pp. 221–234 (nptably p. 233)
