= Bekirler, Nazilli =

Bekirler
- Neighbourhood
- Location in Turkey Bekirler (Turkey Aegean)
- Coordinates: 38.0167°N 28.4333°E
- Country: Turkey
- Province: Aydın
- District: Nazilli
- Population (2022): 470
- Time zone: UTC+3 (TRT)

Bekirler is a neighbourhood in the municipality and district of Nazilli, Aydın Province, Turkey. Its population is 470 (2022).
