= Apaklar, Nazilli =

Apaklar
- Neighbourhood
- Location in Turkey Apaklar (Turkey Aegean)
- Coordinates: 38°03′N 28°18′E
- Country: Turkey
- Province: Aydın
- District: Nazilli
- Population (2022): 162
- Time zone: UTC+3 (TRT)

Apaklar is a small village within the municipality and district of Nazilli, Aydın Province, Turkey. Its population is 162 (2022).
