= Kırcaklı, Nazilli =

Kırcaklı
- Neighbourhood
- Location in Turkey Kırcaklı (Turkey Aegean)
- Coordinates: 37°50′N 28°22′E
- Country: Turkey
- Province: Aydın
- District: Nazilli
- Population (2022): 88
- Time zone: UTC+3 (TRT)

Kırcaklı is a neighbourhood in the municipality and district of Nazilli, Aydın Province, Turkey. Its population is 88 (2022).
