= Eycelli, Nazilli =

Neighbourhood in Aydın, Turkey

Eycelli
- Neighbourhood
- Location in Turkey Eycelli (Turkey Aegean)
- Coordinates: 37°59′N 28°20′E
- Country: Turkey
- Province: Aydın
- District: Nazilli
- Population (2022): 267
- Time zone: UTC+3 (TRT)

Eycelli is a neighbourhood in the municipality and district of Nazilli, Aydın Province, Turkey. Its population is 267 (2022).
