= Akpınar, Nazilli =

Akpınar
- Neighbourhood
- Location in Turkey Akpınar (Turkey Aegean)
- Coordinates: 38.0978°N 28.3477°E
- Country: Turkey
- Province: Aydın
- District: Nazilli
- Population (2022): 256
- Time zone: UTC+3 (TRT)

Akpınar is a neighbourhood in the municipality and district of Nazilli, Aydın Province, Turkey. Its population is 256 (2022).
