= Kestel, Nazilli =

Kestel
- Neighbourhood
- Location in Turkey Kestel (Turkey Aegean)
- Coordinates: 37.9333°N 28.4333°E
- Country: Turkey
- Province: Aydın
- District: Nazilli
- Population (2022): 213
- Time zone: UTC+3 (TRT)

Kestel is a neighbourhood in the municipality and district of Nazilli, Aydın Province, Turkey. Its population is 213 (2022).
