= Şirinevler, Nazilli =

Village in Turkey

Şirinevler
- Neighbourhood
- Location in Turkey Şirinevler (Turkey Aegean)
- Coordinates: 37°54′28″N 28°19′51″E
- Country: Turkey
- Province: Aydın
- District: Nazilli
- Population (2024): 5,669
- Time zone: UTC+3 (TRT)

Şirinevler is a neighbourhood in the municipality and district of Nazilli, Aydın Province, Turkey. Its population is 5,669 (2024).
