= Kurtuluş, Nazilli =

Village in Turkey

Kurtuluş
- Neighbourhood
- Location in Turkey Kurtuluş (Turkey Aegean)
- Coordinates: 37°55′11″N 28°19′52″E
- Country: Turkey
- Province: Aydın
- District: Nazilli
- Population (2024): 3,151
- Time zone: UTC+3 (TRT)

Kurtuluş is a neighbourhood in the municipality and district of Nazilli, Aydın Province, Turkey. Its population is 3,151 (2024).
