= Hamzallı, Nazilli =

Hamzallı
- Neighbourhood
- Location in Turkey Hamzallı (Turkey Aegean)
- Coordinates: 37°54′N 28°25′E
- Country: Turkey
- Province: Aydın
- District: Nazilli
- Population (2022): 714
- Time zone: UTC+3 (TRT)

Hamzallı is a neighbourhood in the municipality and district of Nazilli, Aydın Province, Turkey. Its population is 714 (2022).
