= Cumhuriyet, Nazilli =

Village in Turkey

Cumhuriyet
- Neighbourhood
- Location in Turkey Cumhuriyet (Turkey Aegean)
- Coordinates: 37°54′44″N 28°19′52″E
- Country: Turkey
- Province: Aydın
- District: Nazilli
- Population (2024): 6,812
- Time zone: UTC+3 (TRT)

Cumhuriyet is a neighbourhood in the municipality and district of Nazilli, Aydın Province, Turkey. Its population is 6,812 (2024).
