= Aşağıörencik, Nazilli =

Aşağıörencik
- Neighbourhood
- Location in Turkey Aşağıörencik (Turkey Aegean)
- Coordinates: 38.0077°N 28.3253°E
- Country: Turkey
- Province: Aydın
- District: Nazilli
- Population (2022): 474
- Time zone: UTC+3 (TRT)

Aşağıörencik is a neighbourhood in the municipality and district of Nazilli, Aydın Province, Turkey. Its population is 474 (2022).
