= Bağcıllı, Nazilli =

Bağcıllı
- Neighbourhood
- Location in Turkey Bağcıllı (Turkey Aegean)
- Coordinates: 38°03′N 28°24′E
- Country: Turkey
- Province: Aydın
- District: Nazilli
- Population (2022): 866
- Time zone: UTC+3 (TRT)

Bağcıllı is a neighbourhood in the municipality and district of Nazilli, Aydın Province, Turkey. Its population is 866 (2022).
