= Nazlı =

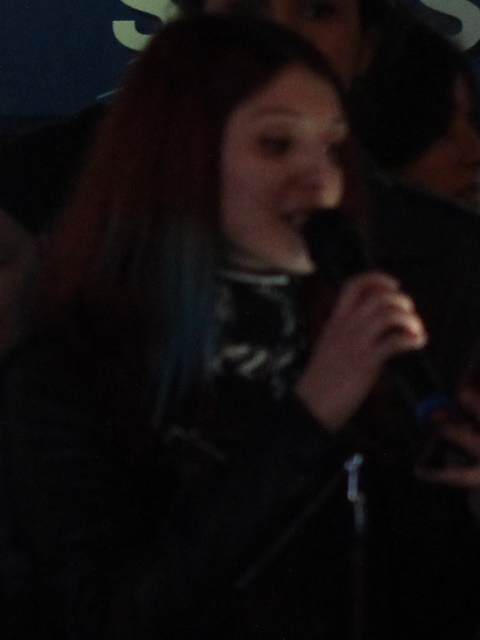
Nazlı Ece Mutlu, the Communist Party of Türkiye's (TKP) mayoral candidate for Antalya Metropolitan Municipality

Nazlı is a common feminine Turkish given name. It means "delicate" or "gracious" in Turkish.

== Etymology ==
Naz is a Persian word for "coy", "coquetr", and "lı" is a Turkish suffix meaning 'to have'. So it means "the one who is delicate and coy.

== People ==
=== Given name ===
- Nazlı Çağla Dönertaş (born 1991), Turkish yachtracer
- Nazlı Çelik (born 1977), Turkish TV presenter
- Nazlı Deniz Kuruoğlu (born 1960), Turkish ballet dancer and former Miss Turkey winner
- Nazlı Ecevit (1900–1985), Turkish painter
- Nazlı Ilıcak (born 1944), Turkish journalist
- Nazlı Mengi (born 1988), Turkish singer
- Nazli Moawad, Egyptian political science professor
- Nazlı Sabri (1894–1978), queen consort of Egypt, of Turkish descent
- Nazlı Savranbaşı (born 2003), Turkish female artistic gymnast
- Nazlı Süleyman (born 1974), Australian councillor
- Nazlı Nəcəfova (1908–1977), Azerbaijani pioneer in women's education
- Nazli Tabatabai-Khatambakhsh (born 1977), Iranian Libretto PGR, Prof. of Dramatic Writing, Assoc
- Nazlı Tolga (born 1979), Dutch journalist of Turkish descent
- Princess Nazli Fazl (1853–1913), Egyptian princess of Turkish descent

== See also ==
- Nazilli, Turkish town said to be named after a woman called Nazlı
