= Yaylapınar, Nazilli =

Yaylapınar
- Neighbourhood
- Location in Turkey Yaylapınar (Turkey Aegean)
- Coordinates: 37°59′2″N 28°15′18″E
- Country: Turkey
- Province: Aydın
- District: Nazilli
- Population (2022): 797
- Time zone: UTC+3 (TRT)

Yaylapınar (formerly: Sinekçiler) is a neighbourhood in the municipality and district of Nazilli, Aydın Province, Turkey. Its population is 797 (2022).
