= Çaylı, Nazilli =

Çaylı
- Neighbourhood
- Country: Turkey
- Province: Aydın
- District: Nazilli
- Population (2022): 465
- Time zone: UTC+3 (TRT)

Çaylı is a neighbourhood in the municipality and district of Nazilli, Aydın Province, Turkey. Its population is 465 (2022).
