= Yalınkuyu, Nazilli =

Yalınkuyu
- Neighbourhood
- Location in Turkey Yalınkuyu (Turkey Aegean)
- Coordinates: 37°56′N 28°25′E
- Country: Turkey
- Province: Aydın
- District: Nazilli
- Population (2022): 196
- Time zone: UTC+3 (TRT)

Yalınkuyu is a neighbourhood in the municipality and district of Nazilli, Aydın Province, Turkey. Its population is 196 (2022).
