= Ketendere, Nazilli =

Ketendere
- Neighbourhood
- Location in Turkey Ketendere (Turkey Aegean)
- Coordinates: 38.0108°N 28.3581°E
- Country: Turkey
- Province: Aydın
- District: Nazilli
- Population (2022): 359
- Time zone: UTC+3 (TRT)

Ketendere is a neighbourhood in the municipality and district of Nazilli, Aydın Province, Turkey. Its population is 359 (2022).
