= İsabeyli =

- Neighbourhood
- Location in Turkey İsabeyli (Turkey Aegean)
- Coordinates: 37°54′40″N 28°15′36″E
- Country: Turkey
- Province: Aydın
- District: Nazilli
- Elevation: 140 m (460 ft)
- Population (2022): 7,829
- Time zone: UTC+3 (TRT)
- Postal code: 09800
- Area code: 0256

İsabeyli is a neighbourhood of the municipality and district of Nazilli, Aydın Province, Turkey. Its population is 7,829 (2022). Before the 2013 reorganisation, it was a town (belde).

It is between Aydın (to west) and Nazilli (to east). The distance to Nazilli is 5 kilometres (3.1 mi), to Aydın is 40 kilometres (25 mi). The name of the town refers to a certain Turkmen leader named İsa who founded the village in 1600s. The settlement was declared a seat of township in 1963. A part of Adnan Menderes University (Aydın University) campus is in İsabeyli.
