= Bayındır, Nazilli =

Bayındır
- Neighbourhood
- Location in Turkey Bayındır (Turkey Aegean)
- Coordinates: 37°59′17″N 28°22′37″E
- Country: Turkey
- Province: Aydın
- District: Nazilli
- Population (2022): 676
- Time zone: UTC+3 (TRT)

Bayındır is a neighbourhood in the municipality and district of Nazilli, Aydın Province, Turkey. Its population is 676 (2022).
