= Ocaklı, Nazilli =

Ocaklı
- Neighbourhood
- Location in Turkey Ocaklı (Turkey Aegean)
- Coordinates: 37°55′59″N 28°16′55″E
- Country: Turkey
- Province: Aydın
- District: Nazilli
- Population (2022): 1,234
- Time zone: UTC+3 (TRT)

Ocaklı is a neighbourhood in the municipality and district of Nazilli, Aydın Province, Turkey. Its population is 1,234 (2022).
