= Aksu, Nazilli =

Aksu
- Neighbourhood
- Location in Turkey Aksu (Turkey Aegean)
- Coordinates: 38.0757°N 28.3305°E
- Country: Turkey
- Province: Aydın
- District: Nazilli
- Population (2022): 830
- Time zone: UTC+3 (TRT)

Aksu is a neighbourhood in the municipality and district of Nazilli, Aydın Province, Turkey, with a population of 830 people (2022).
