= Rahmanlar, Nazilli =

Rahmanlar
- Neighbourhood
- Location in Turkey Rahmanlar (Turkey Aegean)
- Coordinates: 38°2′53″N 28°22′34″E
- Country: Turkey
- Province: Aydın
- District: Nazilli
- Population (2022): 192
- Time zone: UTC+3 (TRT)

Rahmanlar is a neighbourhood in the municipality and district of Nazilli, Aydın Province, Turkey. Its population is 192 (2022).
