= Demirciler, Nazilli =

Demirciler
- Neighbourhood
- Location in Turkey Demirciler (Turkey Aegean)
- Coordinates: 37.9764°N 28.4397°E
- Country: Turkey
- Province: Aydın
- District: Nazilli
- Population (2022): 732
- Time zone: UTC+3 (TRT)

Demirciler is a neighbourhood in the municipality and district of Nazilli, Aydın Province, Turkey. Its population is 732 (2022).
