= Hamidiye, Nazilli =

Hamidiye
- Neighbourhood
- Country: Turkey
- Province: Aydın
- District: Nazilli
- Population (2022): 184
- Time zone: UTC+3 (TRT)

Hamidiye is a neighbourhood in the municipality and district of Nazilli, Aydın Province, Turkey. Its population is 184 (2022).
