= Kaşıkçılar, Nazilli =

Kaşıkçılar
- Neighbourhood
- Country: Turkey
- Province: Aydın
- District: Nazilli
- Population (2022): 113
- Time zone: UTC+3 (TRT)

Kaşıkçılar is a neighbourhood in the municipality and district of Nazilli, Aydın Province, Turkey. Its population is 113 (2022).
