= Kahvederesi, Nazilli =

Kahvederesi
- Neighbourhood
- Location in Turkey Kahvederesi (Turkey Aegean)
- Coordinates: 38°04′N 28°28′E
- Country: Turkey
- Province: Aydın
- District: Nazilli
- Population (2022): 171
- Time zone: UTC+3 (TRT)

Kahvederesi is a neighbourhood in the municipality and district of Nazilli, Aydın Province, Turkey. Its population is 171 (2022).
