= Gedikaltı, Nazilli =

Gedikaltı
- Neighbourhood
- Location in Turkey Gedikaltı (Turkey Aegean)
- Coordinates: 37°58′37″N 28°22′44″E
- Country: Turkey
- Province: Aydın
- District: Nazilli
- Population (2022): 236
- Time zone: UTC+3 (TRT)

Gedikaltı is a neighbourhood in the municipality and district of Nazilli, Aydın Province, Turkey. Its population is 236 (2022).
