= Sailer, Nazilli =

Sailer
- Neighbourhood
- Location in Turkey Sailer (Turkey Aegean)
- Coordinates: 37°57′N 28°22′E
- Country: Turkey
- Province: Aydın
- District: Nazilli
- Population (2022): 258
- Time zone: UTC+3 (TRT)

Sailer is a neighbourhood in the municipality and district of Nazilli, Aydın Province, Turkey. Its population is 258 (2022).
