= Durasıllı, Nazilli =

Durasıllı
- Neighbourhood
- Country: Turkey
- Province: Aydın
- District: Nazilli
- Population (2022): 321
- Time zone: UTC+3 (TRT)

Durasıllı is a neighbourhood in the municipality and district of Nazilli, Aydın Province, Turkey. Its population is 321 (2022).
