= Yazırlı, Nazilli =

Yazırlı
- Neighbourhood
- Location in Turkey Yazırlı (Turkey Aegean)
- Coordinates: 37°51′N 28°23′E
- Country: Turkey
- Province: Aydın
- District: Nazilli
- Population (2022): 472
- Time zone: UTC+3 (TRT)

Yazırlı is a neighbourhood in the municipality and district of Nazilli, Aydın Province, Turkey. Its population is 472 (2022).
