= Ovacık, Nazilli =

Ovacık
- Neighbourhood
- Location in Turkey Ovacık (Turkey Aegean)
- Coordinates: 38°02′17″N 28°25′52″E
- Country: Turkey
- Province: Aydın
- District: Nazilli
- Population (2022): 717
- Time zone: UTC+3 (TRT)

Ovacık is a neighbourhood in the municipality and district of Nazilli, Aydın Province, Turkey. Its population is 717 (2022).
