= Kozdere, Nazilli =

Kozdere
- Neighbourhood
- Location in Turkey Kozdere (Turkey Aegean)
- Coordinates: 38.0000°N 28.4833°E
- Country: Turkey
- Province: Aydın
- District: Nazilli
- Population (2022): 415
- Time zone: UTC+3 (TRT)

Kozdere is a neighbourhood in the municipality and district of Nazilli, Aydın Province, Turkey. Its population is 415 (2022).
