= Kavacık, Nazilli =

Kavacık
- Neighbourhood
- Location in Turkey Kavacık (Turkey Aegean)
- Coordinates: 37.9833°N 28.3167°E
- Country: Turkey
- Province: Aydın
- District: Nazilli
- Population (2022): 258
- Time zone: UTC+3 (TRT)

Kavacık is a neighbourhood in the municipality and district of Nazilli, Aydın Province, Turkey. Its population is 258 (2022).
