= Mastaura (Caria) =

Ancient town in Asia Minor

Mastaura Ancient Greek: Μάσταυρα
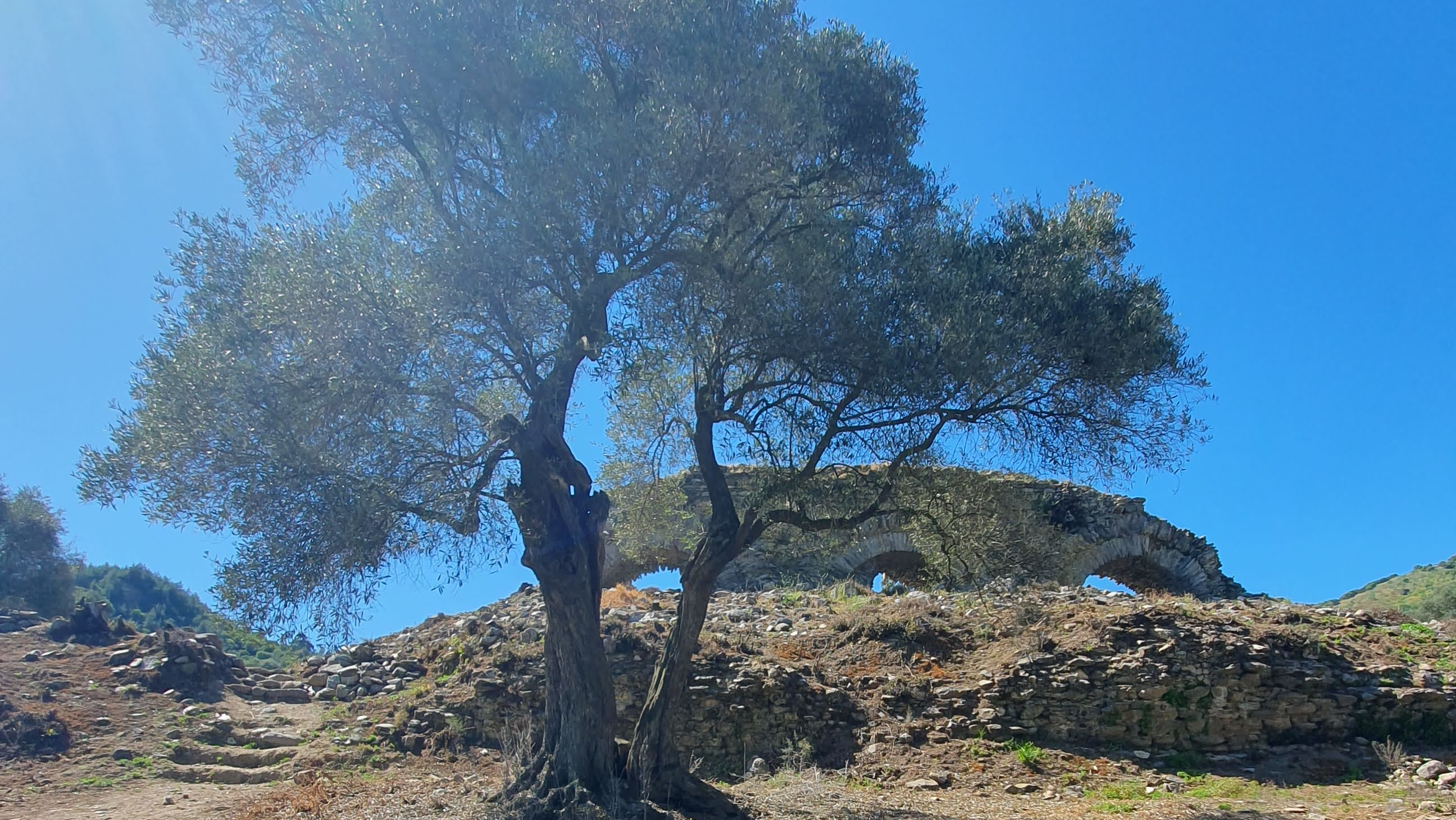
- Roman Bath ruins in the ancient city of Mastaura

- Location within Turkey
- Coordinates: 37°57′23″N 28°20′30″E
- Country: Turkey
- Province: İzmir

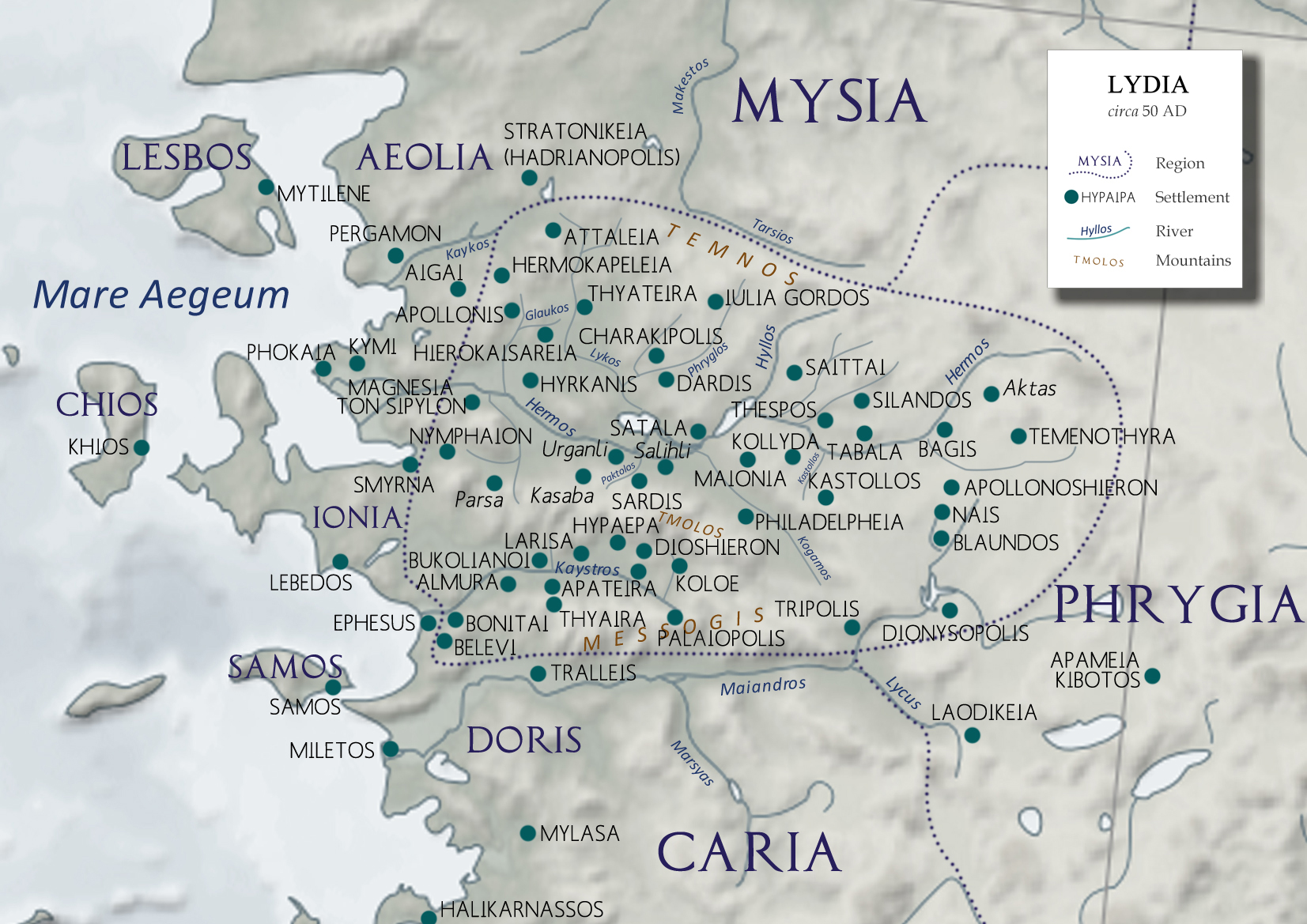
Caria and Lydia circa 50 AD (Mastaura not shown)

Mastaura (Ancient Greek: Μάσταυρα), was an ancient Greek town near Dereağzı, Nazilli in northern Caria, not to be confused with ancient Mastaura (Lycia).

Some sources speak of the town as originally belonging to Lydia, a kingdom into which Croesus (560-546 BC) briefly incorporated Caria.

Pliny the Elder mentions the town as dependent on Ephesus as its provincial capital and thus as belonging in his time (1st century AD) to the Roman province of Asia which, under the Roman Empire, incorporated Caria.

In Severan times the city became rich as evidenced by the impressive buildings.

== Name ==
Stephanus of Byzantium writes that Rhea herself was called Ma among the Lydians, where a bull was sacrificed in her honour. The city was said to have taken its name (Μάσταυρα) from this cult, being interpreted as "Ma's bull".

== Location ==
Mastaura was situated in the north of ancient Caria, at the foot of Mount Messogis, on the small river Chrysaoras, between Tralles and Tripolis.

The geographer Strabo mentions the town as being in the valley of the Maeander River.

Its site is located near Mastavra in Asian Turkey. On 16 October 1836, William Hamilton visited the ruins, then overgrown with ilex trees, brush and brambles.

== Remains ==
In 2021 the remains of a Roman-era amphitheatre dating from about 200 AD and holding up to 20,000 spectators have been discovered still standing to a considerable height. It is only the third amphitheatre to be found in Turkey.

== Coinage ==
Mastaura had the privilege of having a mint and some of its coins are extant.

== Bishopric ==
Le Quien assigns to the city four named bishops. Theodosius attended both the Council of Ephesus in 431 and the Robber Council of Ephesus in 449. His replacement Sabatius asked Bishop Hesperius of Pitanae to represent him at the Council of Chalcedon in 451. Theodorus took part in the Third Council of Constantinople in 680. Constantinus was one of the fathers of the Second Council of Nicaea in 787. To these four may be added a Baanes who was at the Photian Council of Constantinople (879), but it is unclear whether he was bishop of Mastaura in Asia or of Mastaura in Lycia.

No longer a residential bishopric, Mastaura in Asia is today listed by the Catholic Church as a titular see.
