= Pınarbaşı, Nazilli =

Village in Turkey

Pınarbaşı
- Neighbourhood
- Location in Turkey Pınarbaşı (Turkey Aegean)
- Coordinates: 37°55′49″N 28°19′13″E
- Country: Turkey
- Province: Aydın
- District: Nazilli
- Population (2024): 5,379
- Time zone: UTC+3 (TRT)

Pınarbaşı is a neighbourhood in the municipality and district of Nazilli, Aydın Province, Turkey. Its population is 5,379 (2024).
