= Sevindikli, Nazilli =

Sevindikli
- Neighbourhood
- Location in Turkey Sevindikli (Turkey Aegean)
- Coordinates: 37°53′38″N 28°23′02″E
- Country: Turkey
- Province: Aydın
- District: Nazilli
- Population (2022): 379
- Time zone: UTC+3 (TRT)

Sevindikli is a neighbourhood in the municipality and district of Nazilli, Aydın Province, Turkey. Its population is 379 (2022).
