= Yukarıörencik, Nazilli =

Yukarıörencik
- Neighbourhood
- Location in Turkey Yukarıörencik (Turkey Aegean)
- Coordinates: 38°01′30″N 28°19′34″E
- Country: Turkey
- Province: Aydın
- District: Nazilli
- Population (2022): 338
- Time zone: UTC+3 (TRT)

Yukarıörencik is a neighbourhood in the municipality and district of Nazilli, Aydın Province, Turkey. Its population is 338 (2022).
