= Karahallı, Nazilli =

Karahallı
- Neighbourhood
- Country: Turkey
- Province: Aydın
- District: Nazilli
- Population (2022): 521
- Time zone: UTC+3 (TRT)

Karahallı is a neighbourhood in the municipality and district of Nazilli, Aydın Province, Turkey. Its population is 521 (2022).
