= Bozyurt, Nazilli =

Bozyurt
- Neighbourhood
- Location in Turkey Bozyurt (Turkey Aegean)
- Coordinates: 37°56′28″N 28°20′46″E
- Country: Turkey
- Province: Aydın
- District: Nazilli
- Population (2022): 1,914
- Time zone: UTC+3 (TRT)

Bozyurt is a neighbourhood in the municipality and district of Nazilli, Aydın Province, Turkey. Its population is 1,914 (2022).
