= Social Sciences University of Ankara =

Public university in Ankara, Turkey

Ankara Social Sciences University
- Ankara Sosyal Bilimler Üniversitesi
- Type: Public
- Established: January 31, 2013
- Rector: Prof. Dr. Musa Kazım Arıcan
- Academic staff: 397 (2023)
- Students: 5,255 (2022–23)
- Undergraduates: 3,594 (2022–23)
- Postgraduates: 1,332 (2022–23)
- Doctoral students: 328 (2022–23)
- Location: Ankara, Turkey; 39°56′36.3″N 32°51′19.5″E
- Website: www.asbu.edu.tr/en

Ankara Social Sciences University (ASBU, Turkish: Ankara Sosyal Bilimler Üniversitesi) is a public university located in Ankara, Turkey. Founded in 2013, it is Turkey's first public research university specialized in social sciences.

As of the 2022–23 academic year, the university had 5,255 students, including 3,594 undergraduates, 1,332 master's students, and 328 doctoral students. The academic staff consists of 397 members.

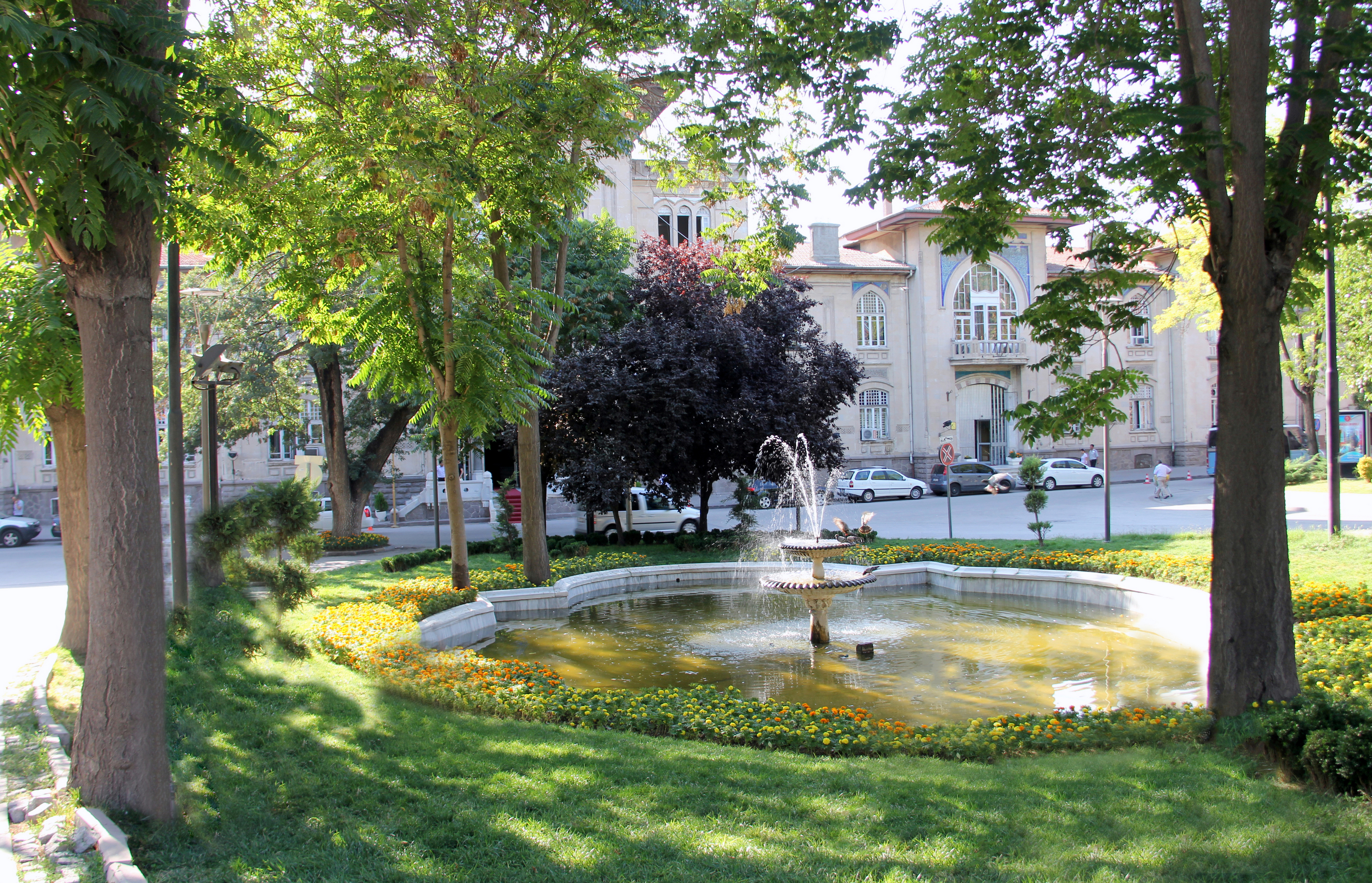
Main campus of Ankara Social Sciences University

== Academic structure ==
=== Faculties ===
- Faculty of Law
- Faculty of Theology
- Faculty of Political Sciences
- Faculty of Social and Human Sciences
- Faculty of Foreign Languages
- Faculty of Art and Design

=== Institutes ===
- Institute of Regional Studies
- Institute of Islamic Studies
- Institute of Social Sciences

=== Vocational Schools ===
- School of Foreign Languages

=== Selected undergraduate programs ===
- Turkish Language and Literature (30% English instruction)
- Law (30% English instruction)
- Theology (30% Arabic instruction)
- Sociology (English)
- History (English)
- Psychology (English)
- Economics (English)
- Business Administration (English)
- Political Science and Public Administration (English)
- International Relations (English)
- English Language and Literature (English)
- Japanese Translation and Interpreting
- Russian Translation and Interpreting

== Rectors ==
- Prof. Dr. Ömer Demir (2013–2015)
- Prof. Dr. Mehmet Barca (2015–2020)
- Prof. Dr. Musa Kazım Arıcan (2020–present)
