= Dereağzı, Nazilli =

Dereağzı
- Neighbourhood
- Location in Turkey Dereağzı (Turkey Aegean)
- Coordinates: 37.9536°N 28.3231°E
- Country: Turkey
- Province: Aydın
- District: Nazilli
- Population (2022): 235
- Time zone: UTC+3 (TRT)

Dereağzı is a neighbourhood in the municipality and district of Nazilli, Aydın Province, Turkey. Its population is 235 (2022).
