= Nazilli =

- District and municipality
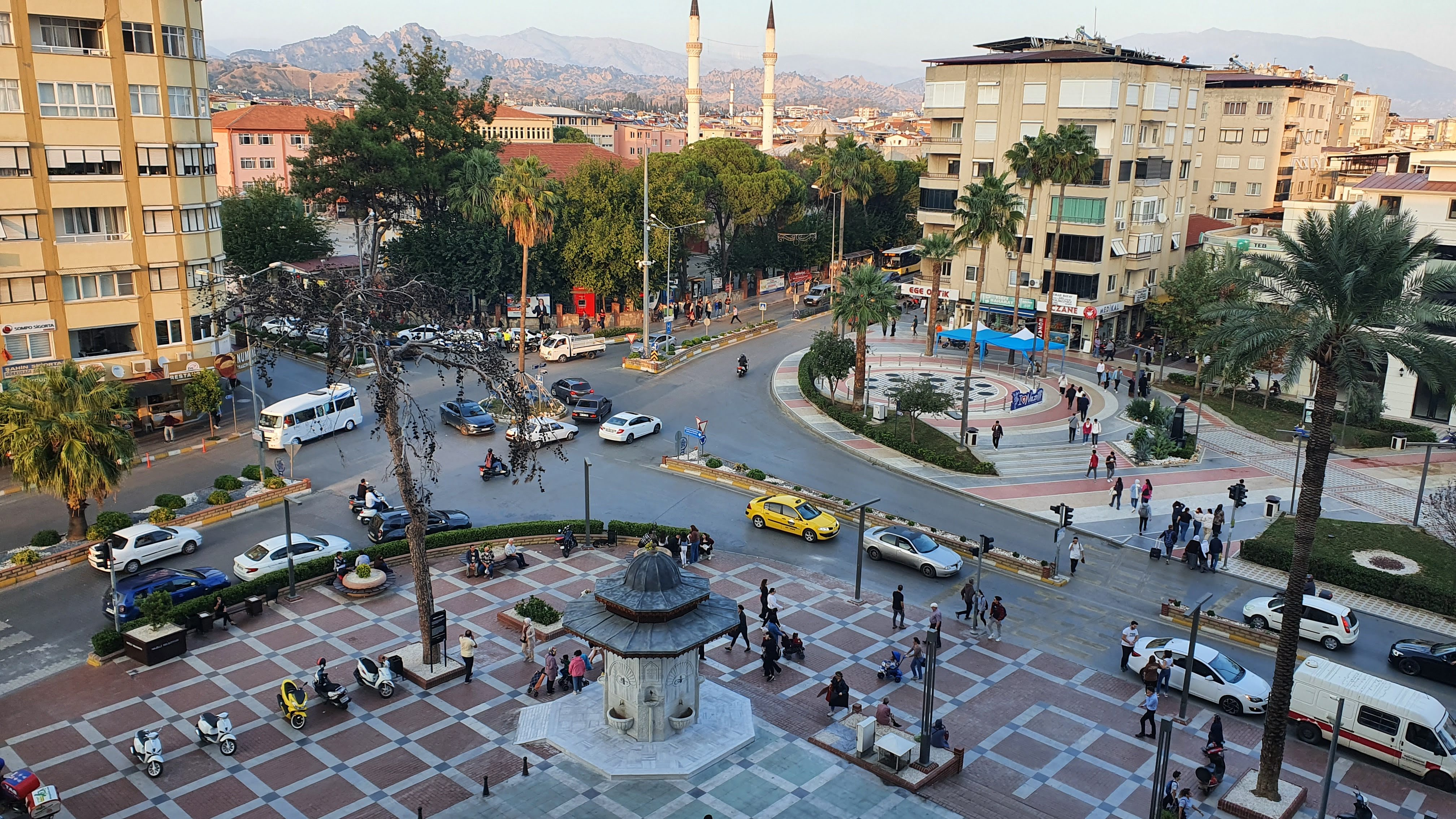
- Nazilli Municipality Square

- Logo

- Map showing Nazilli District in Aydın Province

- Location within Turkey Location within Turkey Aegean
- Coordinates: 37°54′45″N 28°19′14″E
- Country: Turkey
- Province: Aydın

Government
  - Mayor: Ertuğrul Tetik (CHP)
- Area: 691 km^{2} (267 sq mi)
- Population (2022): 162,737
  - Density: 236/km^{2} (610/sq mi)
- Time zone: UTC+3 (TRT)
- Area code: 0256
- Website: www.nazilli.bel.tr

Nazilli is a municipality and district of Aydın Province, Turkey. Its area is 691 km^{2}, and its population is 162,737 (2022). It is the second-largest city in Aydın Province, after the city of Aydın. It is 47 km (29 mi) east of Aydın, on the road to Denizli.

== Etymology ==
Nazilli is a Turkish name that has somehow evolved from the former (also Turkish) name of Pazarköy (marketplace). According to legend, the son of Aydın's governor in the Ottoman period, fell in love with a young woman from Pazarköy but was rejected by the girl's father. The young man later named the town Nazlı Ili (Nazlı's Home) after his loved one. The 17th century traveller Evliya Çelebi held that the town was named for the capriciousness ("naz") of the local women in this wealthy town. Or it could have been the name of a family of Turkomans that settled here.

Nazilli was still called Nazli by the British as of 1920.

== History ==
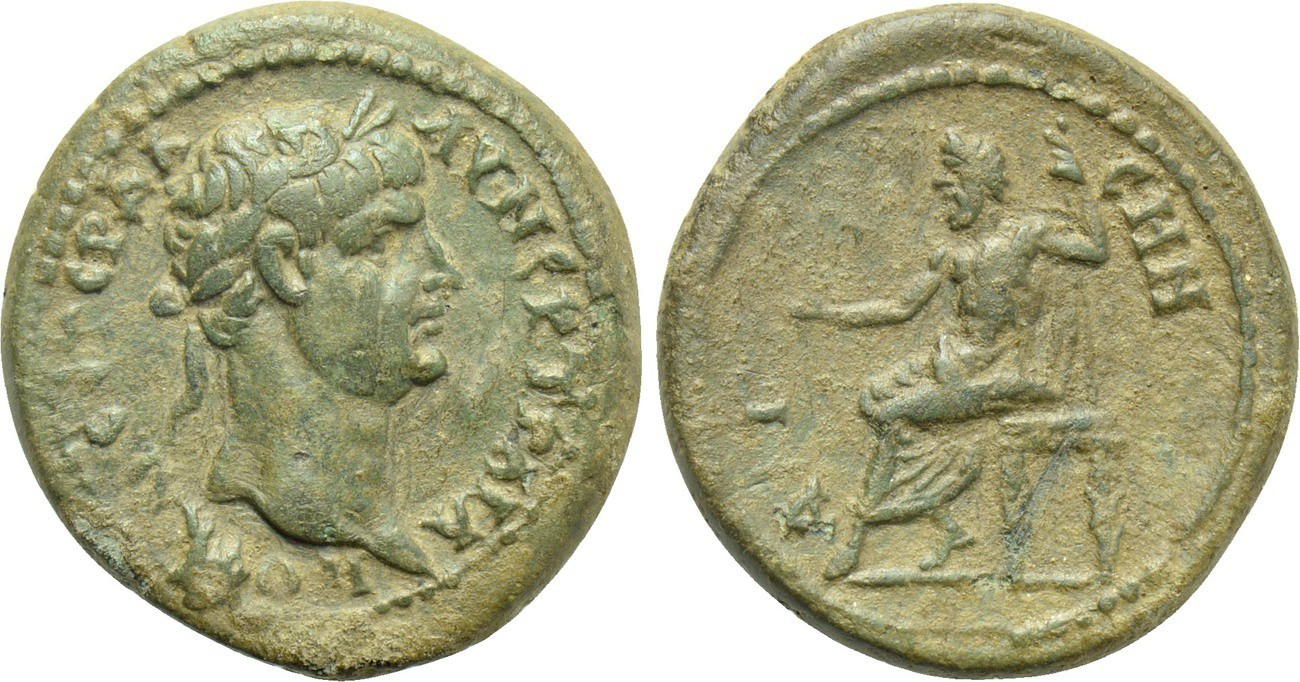
Coins from the ancient city of Harpasa (Ancient Greek: Ἅρπασα), within the borders of the Esenköy village of Aydın-Nazilli district.

These people practiced weaving and thus planted cotton in the area for this purpose. The Oghuz Turks were succeeded by the Anatolian beyliks of Menteşe (in 1280) and then Aydinids.

In 1390 Bayezid I brought the area into the Ottoman Empire. At this time, the town comprised two villages, Cuma Yeri (Friday Square) and Pazarköy (Weekday Market). The town was only later referred to as Nazliköy. In 1402 Timur defeated Bayezid at the Battle of Ankara and took control of the Aegean region, expelling the Knights Hospitaller and giving the Nazilli area back to the Aydinid family. It was quickly recovered for the Ottomans by Sultan Murad II.

From 1867 until 1922, Nazilli was part of the Aidin Vilayet of the Ottoman Empire. During the Turkish War of Independence, Nazilli was occupied by the Greek Army and came under Turkish control on September 5, 1922.

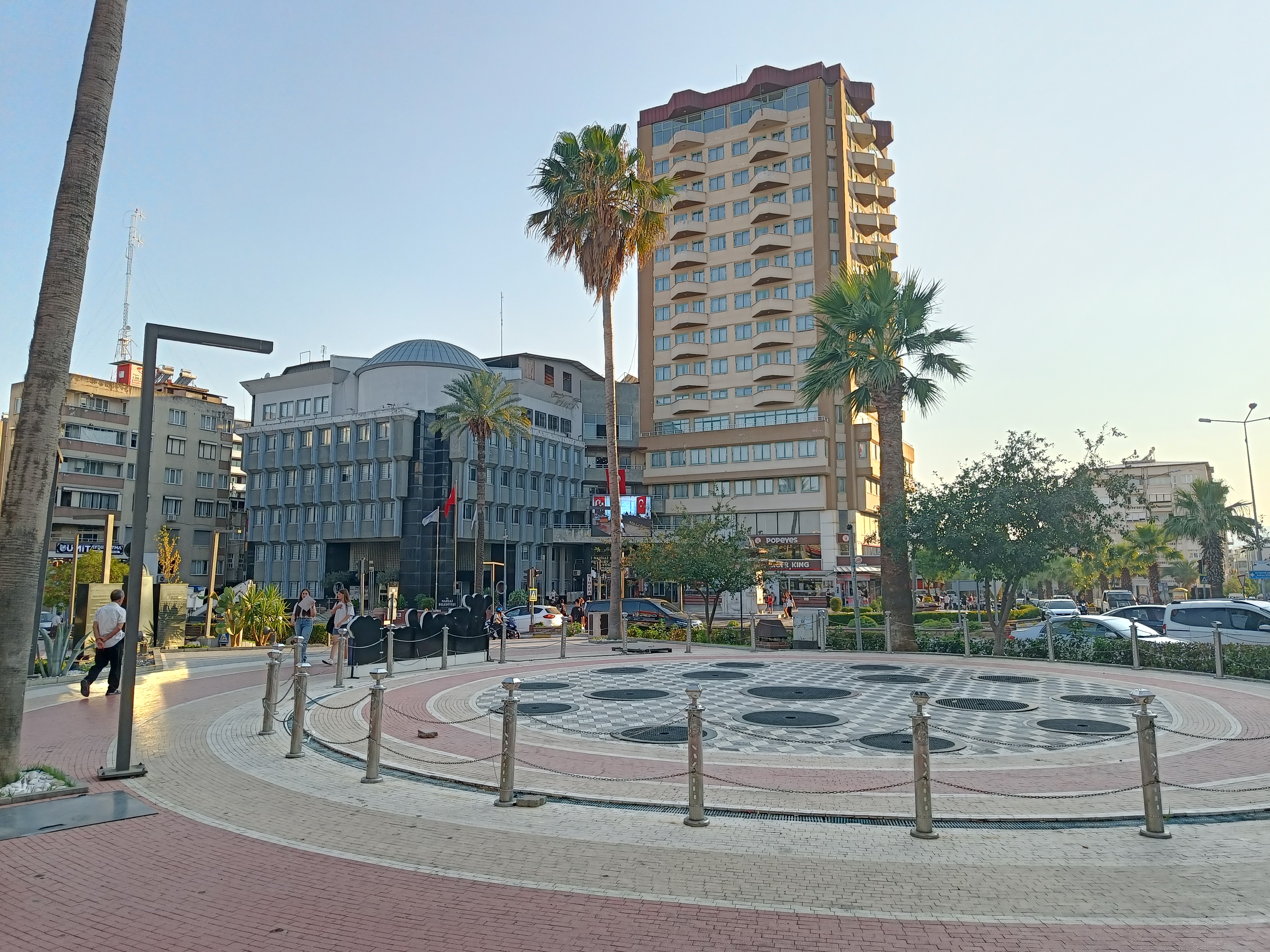
Nazilli Municipality Square

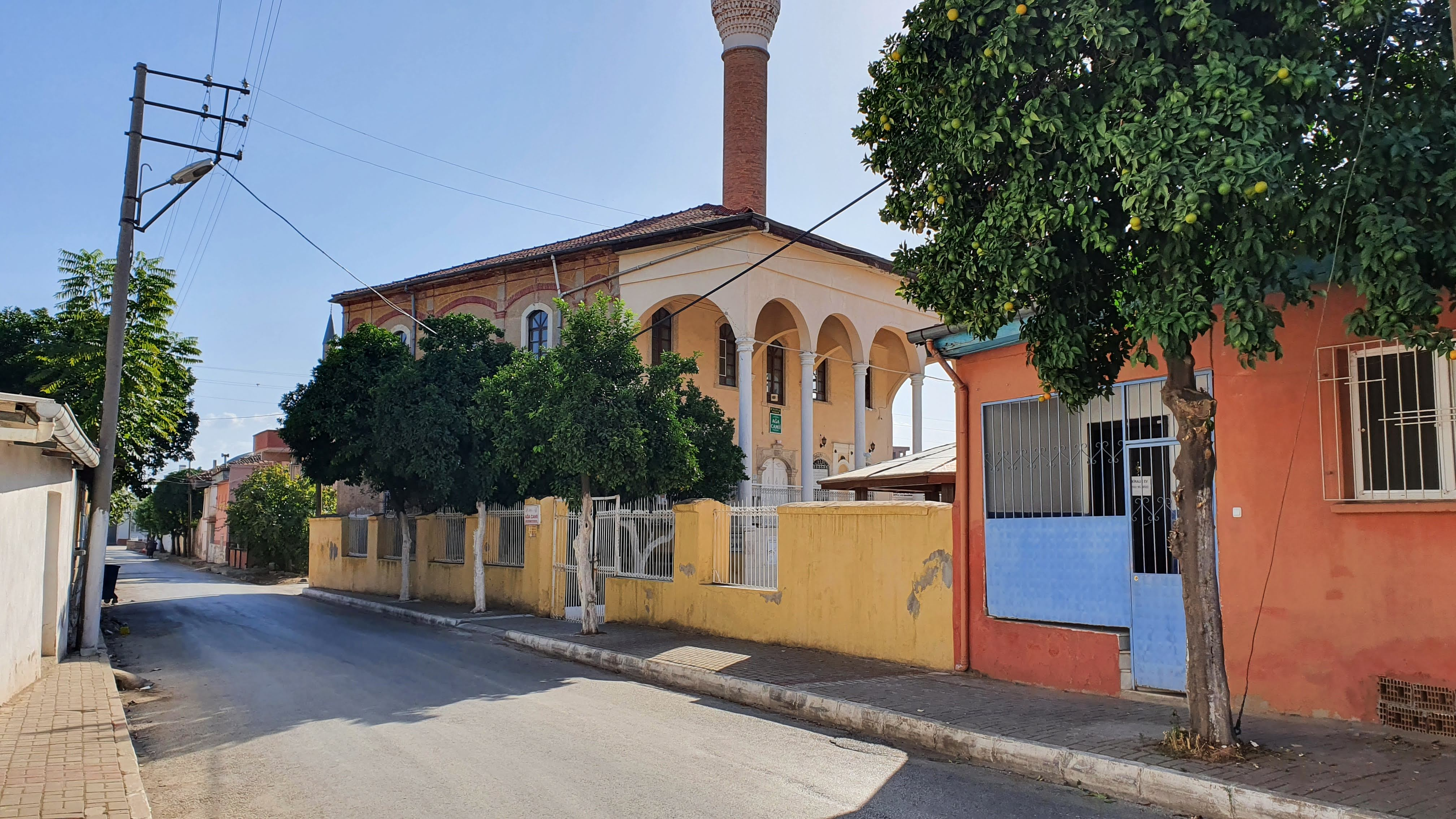
Nazilli Ağa Camii

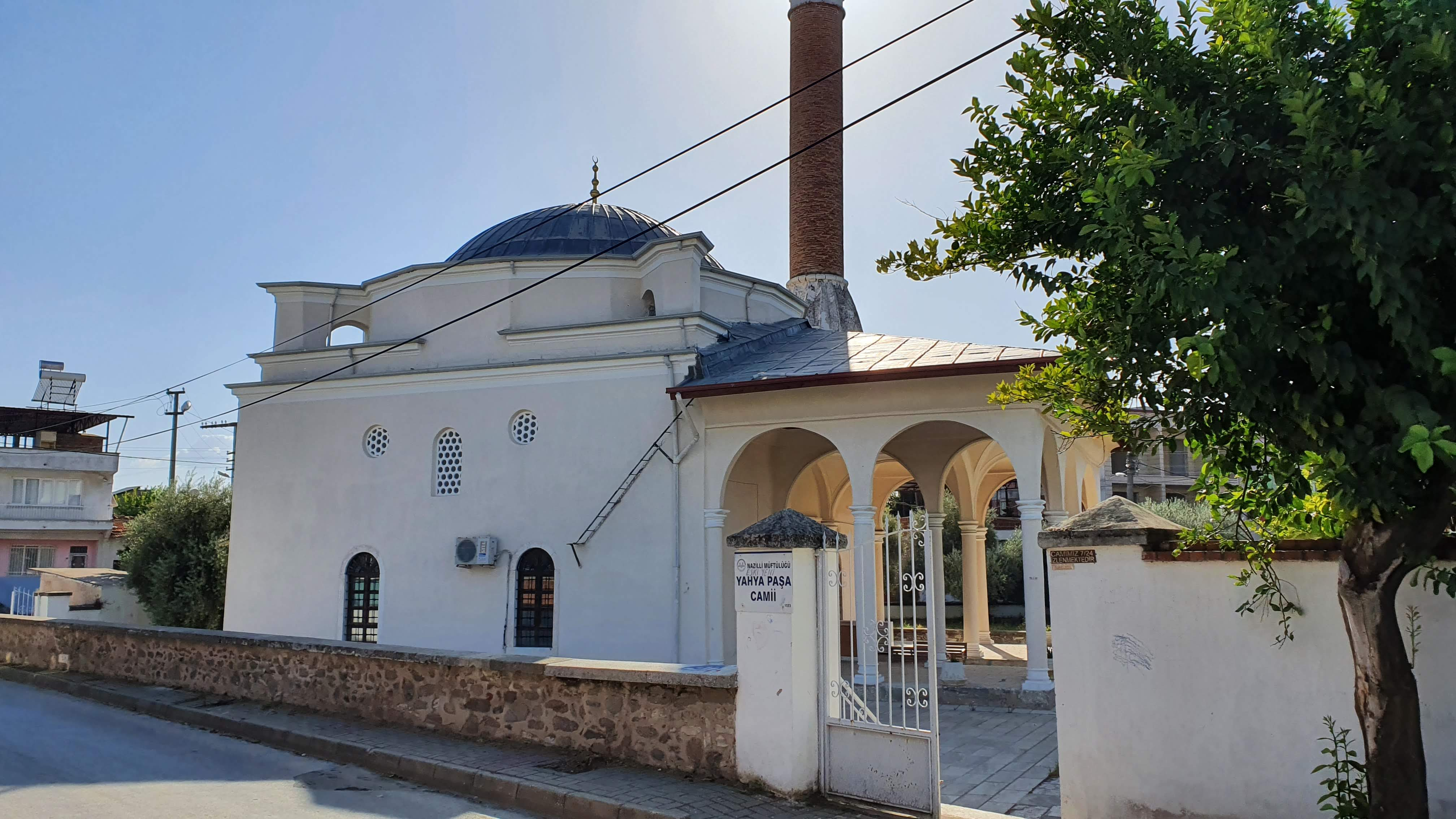
Nazilli Yahya Paşa Camii

== Geography ==
Nazilli stands on the Menderes River and much of the district is in the Menderes valley, full of citrus trees, olives and figs as well as cotton, wheat and other crops.

=== Climate ===
Climate data for Nazilli (1991–2020)
Month	Jan	Feb	Mar	Apr	May	Jun	Jul	Aug	Sep	Oct	Nov	Dec	Year
Mean daily maximum °C (°F)	12.6 (54.7)	14.6 (58.3)	18.4 (65.1)	23.2 (73.8)	28.8 (83.8)	33.8 (92.8)	37.0 (98.6)	37.0 (98.6)	32.6 (90.7)	26.6 (79.9)	19.4 (66.9)	13.9 (57.0)	24.9 (76.8)
Daily mean °C (°F)	7.2 (45.0)	8.6 (47.5)	11.6 (52.9)	15.7 (60.3)	21.0 (69.8)	26.1 (79.0)	29.1 (84.4)	28.6 (83.5)	23.9 (75.0)	18.6 (65.5)	12.4 (54.3)	8.4 (47.1)	17.7 (63.9)
Mean daily minimum °C (°F)	3.0 (37.4)	4.0 (39.2)	5.9 (42.6)	9.3 (48.7)	13.8 (56.8)	18.3 (64.9)	21.3 (70.3)	21.2 (70.2)	16.5 (61.7)	12.3 (54.1)	7.3 (45.1)	4.5 (40.1)	11.5 (52.7)
Average precipitation mm (inches)	104.77 (4.12)	85.18 (3.35)	66.61 (2.62)	51.98 (2.05)	34.84 (1.37)	16.3 (0.64)	5.53 (0.22)	7.63 (0.30)	12.56 (0.49)	41.46 (1.63)	73.77 (2.90)	102.36 (4.03)	602.99 (23.74)
Average precipitation days (≥ 1.0 mm)	8.9	7.5	6.8	6.1	5.1	2.4	2.0	1.6	2.5	3.9	6.0	9.1	61.9
Average relative humidity (%)	72.1	68.6	65.0	61.5	54.8	46.6	44.0	48.2	53.5	61.8	69.9	74.6	60.0
Source: NOAA

== Composition ==
There are 82 neighbourhoods in Nazilli District:

- Akpınar
- Aksu
- Altıntaş
- Apaklar
- Arslanlı
- Aşağıörencik
- Aşağıyakacık
- Aydoğdu
- Bağcıllı
- Bayındır
- Beğerli
- Bekirler
- Bereketli
- Bozyurt
- Çapahasan
- Çatak
- Çaylı
- Çobanlar
- Cumhuriyet
- Dallıca
- Demirciler
- Dereağzı
- Derebaşı
- Dualar
- Dumlupınar
- Durasıllı
- Esenköy
- Esentepe
- Eycelli
- Gedik
- Gedikaltı
- Güzelköy
- Hamidiye
- Hamzallı
- Hasköy
- Haydarlı
- Hisarcık
- İsabeyli
- Işıklar
- İstiklal
- Kahvederesi
- Karaçay
- Karahallı
- Kardeşköy
- Kaşıkçılar
- Kavacık
- Kestel
- Ketendere
- Ketenova
- Kırcaklı
- Kızıldere
- Kocakesik
- Kozdere
- Kurtuluş
- Kuşçular
- Mescitli
- Ocaklı
- Ovacık
- Pınarbaşı
- Pirlibey
- Prof. Muammer Aksoy
- Rahmanlar
- Sailer
- Samailli
- Sevindikli
- Şimşelli
- Şirinevler
- Sümer
- Toygar
- Turan
- Uzunçam
- Yalınkuyu
- Yaylapınar
- Yazırlı
- Yellice
- Yeni
- Yenisanayi
- Yeşil
- Yeşilyurt
- Yıldıztepe
- Yukarıörencik
- Zafer

== Economy ==
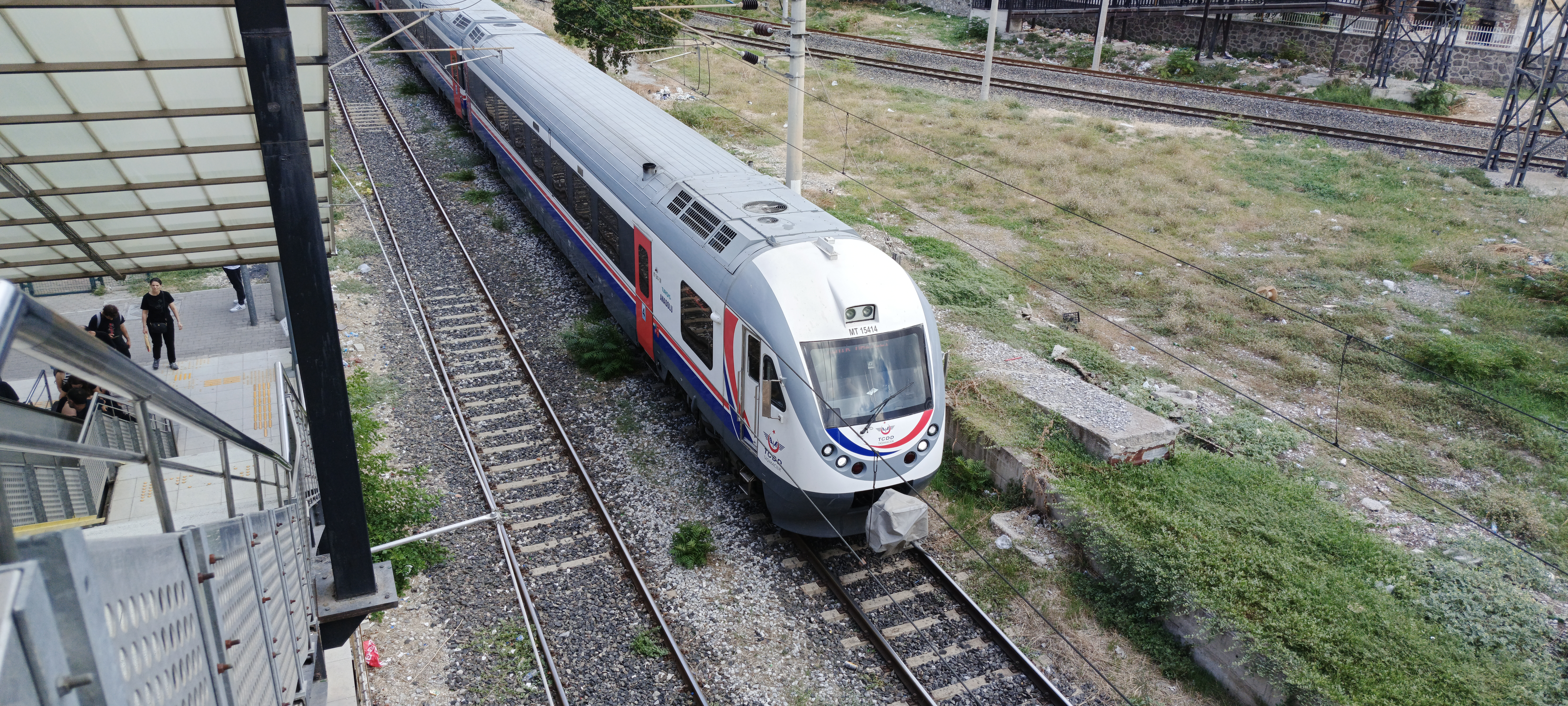
A westbound regional train to Söke

Historically, Nazilli was a producer of lignite. As of 1914, they were producing large quantities which were managed by a company from the United States. The lignite, in 1920, was described as being "deplorably bad," despite demand for it to be exported to Smyrna. Just north of Nazilli, in 1920, were reported emery mines, too. Nazilli has also been renowned for being an important dried fig producer towns of Anatolia. Petros Mengos, a Greek from Kokluca village in Smyrna, who volunteered to fight in the Greek Revolution stated that "The best figs exported from Smyrna are brought on camels, from a province sixty miles interior, called Naslée, or in Greek Ilioupolis."

== Points of Interest ==
- Arpaz Castle, also known as Arpaz Beyler Mansion.

== Notable people ==
- Fatih Takmaklı (1983-), Author

== Contemporary Nazilli ==
Nazilli today has a population of 156,748 (according to the 2018 census).

The Basmane-Nazilli Regional railway service runs between İzmir and Nazilli.
