= List of municipalities in Aydın Province =

This is the List of municipalities in Aydın Province, Turkey as of October 2007.

== Municipalities ==
List is sorted alphabetically A-Z, as Districts->Municipalities.

District	Municipality
Aydın (Merkez)	Aydın
Aydın	Çeştepe
Aydın	Dalama
Aydın	Ovaeymir
Aydın	Tepecik
Aydın	Umurlu
Bozdoğan	Bozdoğan
Bozdoğan	Yazıkent
Buharkent	Buharkent
Çine	Akçaova
Çine	Çine
Didim	Akbük
Didim	Akyeniköy
Didim	Didim
Germencik	Germencik
Germencik	Hıdırbeyli
Germencik	Mursallı
Germencik	Ortaklar
İncirliova	Acarlar
İncirliova	İncirliova
Karacasu	Ataeymir
Karacasu	Geyre
Karacasu	Karacasu
Karacasu	Yenice
Karpuzlu	Karpuzlu
Koçarlı	Bıyıklı
Koçarlı	Koçarlı
Koçarlı	Yeniköy
Köşk	Köşk
Kuşadası	Davutlar
Kuşadası	Güzelçamlı
Kuşadası	Kuşadası
Kuyucak	Başaran
Kuyucak	Horsunlu
Kuyucak	Kurtuluş
Kuyucak	Kuyucak
Kuyucak	Pamukören
Kuyucak	Yamalak
Nazilli	Arslanlı
Nazilli	İsabeyli
Nazilli	Nazilli
Nazilli	Pirlibey
Söke	Atburgazı
Söke	Bağarası
Söke	Güllübahçe
Söke	Sarıkemer
Söke	Savuca
Söke	Sazlı
Söke	Söke
Söke	Yenidoğan
Sultanhisar	Atça
Sultanhisar	Salavatlı
Sultanhisar	Sultanhisar
Yenipazar	Yenipazar

== Changes in 2014 ==
According to Law act no. 6360, belde (town) municipalities within provinces with more than 750,000 population (so called Metropolitan municipalities) were abolished as of 30 March 2014. 36 belde municipalities in the above list are now defunct. The list is kept for historical reference.
