= Azizabat, Kuyucak =

Azizabat
- Neighbourhood
- Location in Turkey Azizabat (Turkey Aegean)
- Coordinates: 37°52′N 28°34′E
- Country: Turkey
- Province: Aydın
- District: Kuyucak
- Population (2022): 530
- Time zone: UTC+3 (TRT)

Azizabat is a neighbourhood in the municipality and district of Kuyucak, Aydın Province, Turkey. Its population is 530 (2022).

A few km southeast of Azizabat lie the ruins of Antioch on the Maeander, an ancient Byzantine city, and location of the Battle of Antioch on the Meander in 1211 between the forces of the Empire of Nicea and the Seljuk Turks.
