= Bargasa (northern Caria) =

Town of ancient Caria

Coordinates: 37°37′10″N 28°24′39″E

Bargasa (Ancient Greek: Βάργασα) was an inland town in the north of ancient Caria, inhabited during Hellenistic and Roman times.

Its site is located near Haydere/Kavaklı in Asiatic Turkey.
