= Abdurrahmanlar =

Abdurrahmanlar could refer to:

- Abdurrahmanlar, Serik (in Turkey)
- Abdurrahmanlar, Germencik (in Turkey)
