= Çarıklar (disambiguation) =

Çarıklar is the name of several small settlements in Turkey:

- Çarıklar, a town in Anamur district of Mersin Province
- Çarıklar, Germencik, a village in Germencik district of Aydın Province
- Çarıklar, Köprübaşı, a village in Köprübaşı district of Manisa Province
