= Çamdibi =

Çamdibi can refer to:

- Çamdibi, Kuyucak
- Çamdibi, Refahiye
- Çamdibi (İzmir Metro)
