= Koyuncular =

Koyuncular (literally "sheepmen") is a Turkish word. It may refer to:

- Koyuncular, Bozdoğan, a village in the district of Bozdoğan, Aydın Province, Turkey
- Koyuncular, Hopa, a village in the district of Hopa, Artvin Province, Turkey

== See also ==
- Koyuncu (disambiguation)
