= Bozköy =

Bozköy may refer to the following places in Turkey:

- Bozköy, Germencik, a neighbourhood in Germencik District, Aydın Province
- Bozköy, Karaburun, a neighbourhood in Karaburun District, İzmir Province
- Bozköy, Çiftlik, a town in Çiftlik District, Niğde Province
