= Alamut (disambiguation) =

Alamut, is a region in north of Qazvin province, Iran.

Alamut may also refer to:

- Alamut Castle, a mountain fortress in Alamut region
- Alamut state, or the Nizari Ismaili state, founded by Hassan-i Sabbah
- Alamut series, a 1991 series of novels by Judith Tarr about the Alamut fortress
- Alamut (Bartol novel), a 1938 novel by Vladimir Bartol about the Hashshashin and named after the Alamut fortress
- Alamut River, Iran
- Alamut, Bozdoğan, a village in the district of Bozdoğan, Aydın Province, Turkey
- "Alamut", a 1918 short story, part of the Khlit the Cossack series by Harold Lamb
