= Syneta (Caria) =

Town of ancient Caria

Coordinates: 37°54′26″N 28°44′13″E

Syneta was a polis of ancient Caria, inhabited during Hellenistic times. Its name does not occur among ancient authors, but is inferred from epigraphic and other evidence.

Its site is tentatively located near Bucakköy in Asiatic Turkey.
