= Güneyyaka =

Güneyyaka (literally "south side") is a Turkish place name that may refer to the following places in Turkey:

- Güneyyaka, Bozdoğan, a village in the district of Bozdoğan, Aydın Province
- Güneyyaka, Gündoğmuş, a village in the district of Gündoğmuş, Antalya Province
- Güneyyaka, Söke, a village in the district of Söke, Aydın Province
