= Mylasa and Melanoudion =

Theme of the Byzantine Empire

The Theme of Mylasa and Melanoudion (Greek: θέμα Μυλά[σ]σης και Μελανουδίου) was a Byzantine province (thema) in southwestern Asia Minor (modern Turkey) in the 12th and 13th centuries.

It is first attested in 1127/1128, and was probably created sometime after 1110, either by Alexios I Komnenos (r. 1081–1118) or by his son and successor John II Komnenos (r. 1118–1143), out of territory regained from the Seljuk Turks during the 1090s. Originally named simply the Theme of Mylasa, it was renamed after its seat moved from Mylasa (modern Milas) to the town of Melanoudion – as yet not conclusively identified, it lay south of Miletus – sometime in ca. 1150–1175.

The theme comprised most of the region of Caria, from the Maeander River in the north to the valley of the river Morsynos (mod. Vandalas Çayi) in the east. The coast however belonged to the Cibyrrhaeot Theme and, after the latter's disbandment sometime during the reign of Manuel I Komnenos (r. 1143–1180), it was joined with the nearby islands of the Dodecanese, chiefly Kos. Some of the doukes of Mylasa and Melanoudion however seem to have exercised authority over the coast and the offshore islands as well.

It remained intact until it was lost to the Turks during the reign of Michael VIII (r. 1261–1281). It is notable for the number of Byzantine fortifications which survive there, as well as for the thriving monastic community at Mount Latros.

== Sources ==
- Kazhdan, Alexander, ed. (1991). The Oxford Dictionary of Byzantium. Oxford and New York: Oxford University Press. p. 1428. ISBN 0-19-504652-8.
- Ragia, Efi (2005). Η αναδιοργάνωση των θεμάτων στη Μικρά Ασία τον δωδέκατο αιώνα και το θέμα Μυλάσσης και Μελανουδίου [The reorganization of the themes in Asia Minor in the twelfth century and the theme of Mylasa and Melanoudion]. Byzantina Symmeikta (in Greek). 17: 223–238. ISSN 1105-1639. Archived from the original on 2013-05-06.
