= Tekeliler, Karacasu =

Tekeliler
- Neighbourhood
- Country: Turkey
- Province: Aydın
- District: Karacasu
- Population (2022): 257
- Time zone: UTC+3 (TRT)

Tekeliler is a neighbourhood in the municipality and district of Karacasu, Aydın Province, Turkey. Its population is 257 (2022).
