= Nargedik, Karacasu =

Nargedik
- Neighbourhood
- Location in Turkey Nargedik (Turkey Aegean)
- Coordinates: 37°37′N 28°40′E
- Country: Turkey
- Province: Aydın
- District: Karacasu
- Population (2022): 117
- Time zone: UTC+3 (TRT)

Nargedik is a neighbourhood in the municipality and district of Karacasu, Aydın Province, Turkey. Its population is 117 (2022).
