= Selatin, Germencik =

Selatin
- Neighbourhood
- Location in Turkey Selatin (Turkey Aegean)
- Coordinates: 37°58′N 27°30′E
- Country: Turkey
- Province: Aydın
- District: Germencik
- Population (2022): 405
- Time zone: UTC+3 (TRT)

Selatin is a neighbourhood in the municipality and district of Germencik, Aydın Province, Turkey. Its population is 405 (2022).
