= Palamutçuk, Karacasu =

Palamutçuk
- Neighbourhood
- Location in Turkey Palamutçuk (Turkey Aegean)
- Coordinates: 37°44′N 28°46′E
- Country: Turkey
- Province: Aydın
- District: Karacasu
- Population (2022): 440
- Time zone: UTC+3 (TRT)

Palamutçuk is a neighbourhood in the municipality and district of Karacasu, Aydın Province, Turkey. Its population is 440 (2022).
