= Hışımlar, Bozdoğan =

Hışımlar
- Neighbourhood
- Location in Turkey Hışımlar (Turkey Aegean)
- Coordinates: 37°33′N 28°20′E
- Country: Turkey
- Province: Aydın
- District: Bozdoğan
- Population (2022): 297
- Time zone: UTC+3 (TRT)

Hışımlar is a neighbourhood in the municipality and district of Bozdoğan, Aydın Province, Turkey. Its population is 297 (2022).
