= Battle of Antioch on the Meander =

Battle between Nicaea Empire and Seljuk Sultanate

Coordinates: 37.873435°N 28.574239°E

- Part of the Byzantine–Seljuk wars
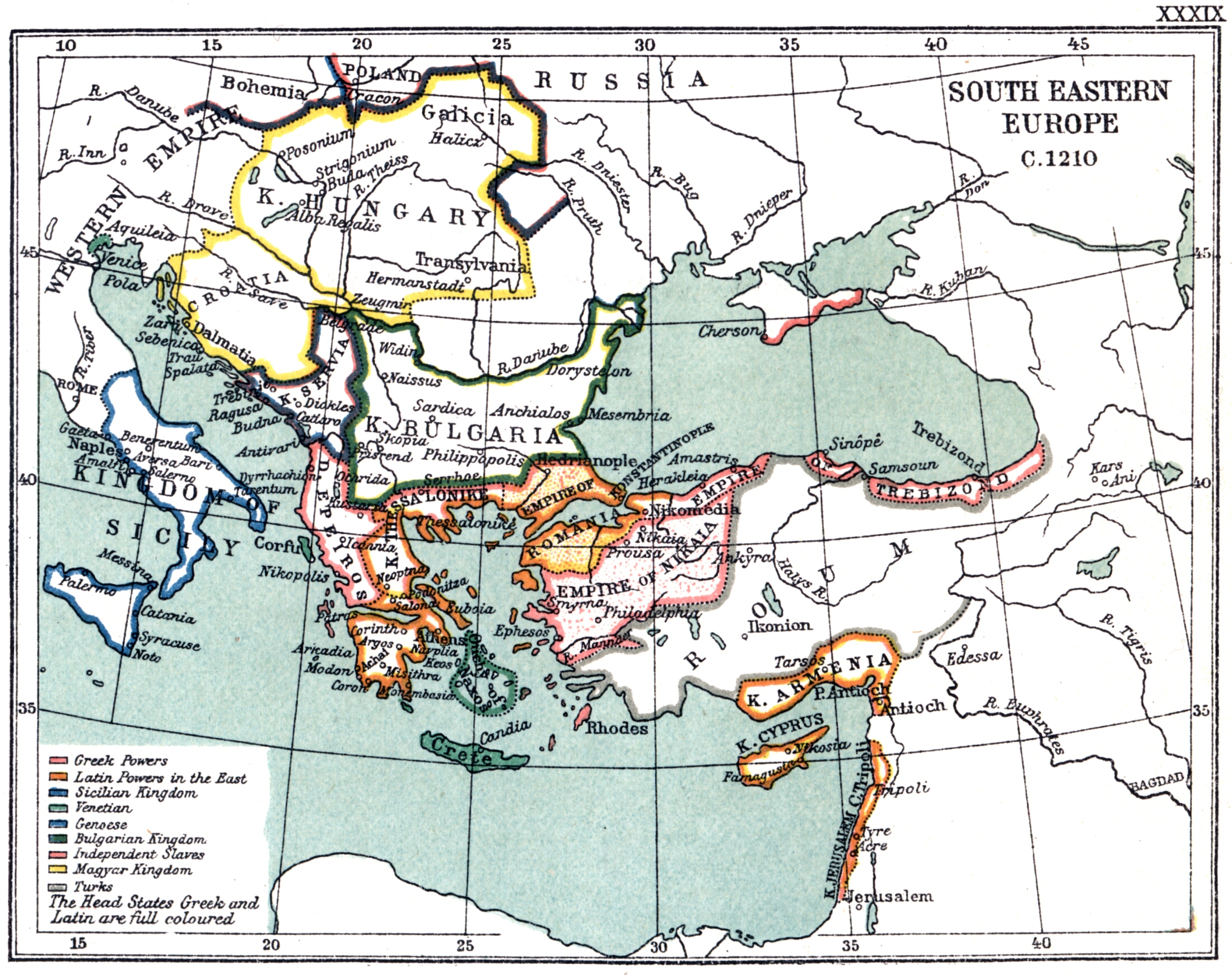
- Map of southeastern Europe and Asia Minor, showing the Nicaean Empire and Seljuk Sultanate c. 1210.
Date	Probably 17 June 1211
Location	Asia Minor
Result	Nicaean victory

Belligerents
Empire of Nicaea	Seljuk Sultanate of Rûm

Commanders and leaders
Theodore I Laskaris	Kaykhusraw I †; Alexios III Angelos (POW)

Strength
2,000 cavalry; 800 Latin cavalry	5,000–11,000

Casualties and losses
Heavy, most of the Latins died	Heavy

The Battle of Antioch on the Meander (also known as the Battle of Alaşehir) was a military engagement near Antioch-on-the-Meander between the forces of the Empire of Nicaea and the Seljuk Sultanate of Rûm. The Turkish defeat ensured continued Nicaean hegemony of the Aegean coast of Asia Minor. The Seljuk sultan, Kaykhusraw I, was killed on the field of battle. The battle took place near the modern town of Yamalak in Kuyucak district in Aydın Province.

== Background ==
Following the capture of Constantinople by the forces of the Fourth Crusade (1204) and the partition of the Byzantine Empire, Theodore Laskaris (r. 1205–1222), crowned emperor in 1208, built up a power base in the former Byzantine territory of western Anatolia. This new polity was to become known as the Empire of Nicaea. Nicaea was one of the main Greek successor states that claimed the heritage of the Byzantine Empire, the other successor states were Epirus and later the Empire of Thessalonica in western Greece. Nicaea was threatened from the north by the new Latin Empire established by the Crusaders, and from the east by the Seljuk Sultanate of Rum.

The peace with the Seljuks was disturbed through the arrival, in early 1211, of the former Byzantine Emperor Alexios III (r. 1195–1203), at the port of Attaleia. The subsequent events are described in some detail by a number of near-contemporary sources, chiefly the chroniclers Ibn al-Athir and Ibn Bibi on the Seljuk side and the histories of George Akropolites and Nikephoros Gregoras on the Byzantine side, as well as references in other chronicles and the orations in honour of Theodore Laskaris by Niketas Choniates.

Alexios had fled Constantinople on the approach of the Crusaders in 1203, but had not given up on his rights to the throne, and was determined to reclaim it. In 1203–1205, he had wandered across Greece, seeking the support of powerful local grandees, before being captured by Boniface of Montferrat and held captive until ransomed by his first cousin, Michael of Epirus, in 1210. Although Theodore Laskaris was Alexios's son-in-law, having married his daughter Anna, Alexios resolved to seek the aid of the Seljuk sultan, Kaykhusraw I (r. 1192–1196 and 1205–1211), with whom he had close relations: Alexios had sheltered him in Constantinople during the latter's exile, and George Akropolites claims that the two fled from Constantinople together in 1203.

The sultan welcomed Alexios warmly, and the deposed emperor, after reminding the sultan of the succour he had given him, promised him rich rewards if he would help restore him to his throne. Kaykhusraw, having found in supporting Alexios's cause a perfect pretext for attacking Nicaean territory, sent an emissary to Theodore at Nicaea, calling upon him to relinquish his domains to the legitimate emperor. Theodore refused to reply to the sultan's demands, and the sultan assembled his army and invaded Laskaris' domains.

== Battle ==
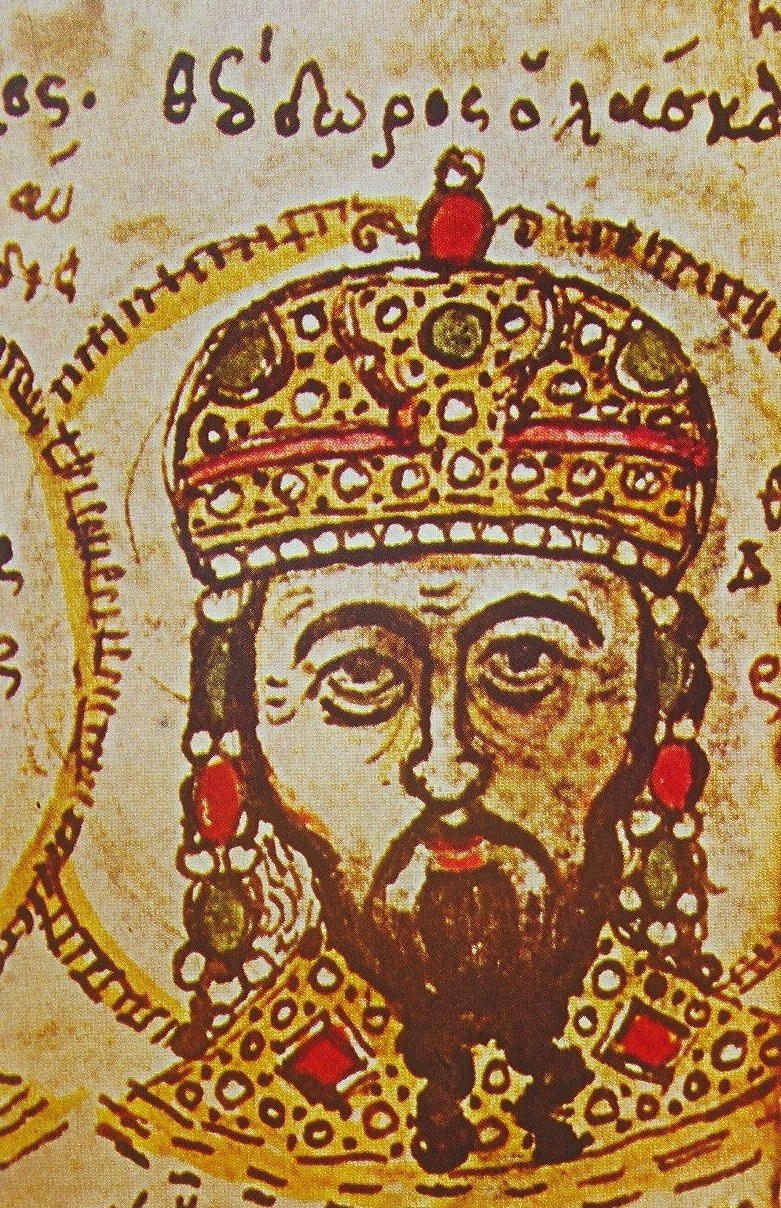
Theodore I Laskaris (r. 1205–1222), 15th-century manuscript.

Kaykhusraw's army, with Alexios III in tow, laid siege to Antioch on the Maeander, which he hoped to use as a base to subdue the rest of the Meander Valley. The size of the Seljuk force is unknown. The hagiographer George of Pelagonia in his hagiography estimates it at 60,000, clearly an impossible figure, and even Gregoras's 20,000 seems to be exaggerated. Nevertheless, it was clearly a considerably larger force than the army Theodore managed to scrape together: both Gregoras and Akropolites put it at 2,000 men (3,000 according to George of Pelagonia), of whom 800 were Latin (Note: "Latin" is the term used for people, of mixed national origins, from western Europe who followed the "Latin Rite" (Roman Catholic) rather than the "Greek Rite" (Greek Orthodoxy). Latins, sometimes alternatively called "Franks", were prominent in many of the eastern Mediterranean lands in this period.) and the rest Byzantine Greeks. Laskaris marched his army from Nicaea over the Mysian Olympus and reached Philadelphia in eleven days (indeed, the Seljuk chroniclers name Philadelphia rather than Antioch as the site of the battle.) There he learned that Antioch was about to fall, and led his army in a forced march towards the town, discarding all baggage except for a few days' rations.

According to Gregoras, Laskaris intended to catch the Turks off guard by his rapid approach, but Akropolites relates that the Nicaean ruler sent Kaykhusraw's ambassador, whom he had taken along, to inform his master of his arrival. The sultan at first appeared incredulous, but eventually abandoned the siege and drew up his forces for battle. The Turks were constrained by the narrowness of the valley and could not deploy their full force, especially their cavalry. Hence, the sultan decided to await the Nicaean attack instead. As the Nicaean army drew close to the Turks, Laskaris's Latin mercenary cavalry launched an impetuous charge on the Turkish centre; their attack inflicted many casualties on the Turks, in particular the lightly armed archers and slingers, as the knights drove through their formation and then wheeled back and charged it again from the rear. Kaykhusraw, however, soon managed to restore discipline among his troops, shaken by the sudden Latin onslaught, and used his superior numbers to surround and annihilate the Latins. The Turks then turned on the rest of the Nicaean army, which, after suffering casualties, began to retreat and break up.

As the sources narrate, at this moment of victory, the Seljuk sultan sought out Laskaris, who was hard pressed by the attacking Turkish troops. Kaykhusraw charged his enemy and gave him a heavy blow on the head with a mace, so that the Nicaean emperor, dizzied, fell from his horse. Kaykhusraw was already giving orders to his retinue to carry Laskaris away, when the latter regained his composure and brought Kaykhusraw down by hacking at his mount's rear legs. The sultan too fell on the ground and was beheaded. His head was impaled on a lance and hoisted aloft for his army to see, causing the Turks to panic and retreat. It is unclear who delivered the fatal blow to the sultan: Choniates and Gregoras attribute this deed to Laskaris himself, Ibn Bibi to an unknown Frankish mercenary; Akropolites says that neither the emperor nor his attendants saw who did this, while George of Pelagonia claims that Kaykhusraw and not Laskaris was unhorsed first, and that one of the emperor's attendants cut off his head. Though the Turks retreated, allegedly at speed, the Nicaean army was so depleted in numbers that it could not mount a pursuit.

== Aftermath ==
In this way Laskaris snatched victory from the jaws of defeat, although his own army was well-nigh destroyed in the process. The battle ended the Seljuk threat: Kaykhusraw's son and successor, Kaykaus I, concluded a truce with Nicaea on 14 June 1211, and the border between the two states would remain virtually unchallenged until the 1260s. The former emperor Alexios, Laskaris's father-in-law, was also captured during the battle. Laskaris treated him well but stripped him of his imperial insignia and consigned him to the monastery of Hyakinthos in Nicaea, where he ended his days.

Following the battle, the Turks carried the body of their sultan back to Konya, where he was buried in the dynastic mausoleum. Ibn Bibi relates that Theodore Laskaris gave 20,000 dirhams to be distributed at the sultan's funeral as alms.

The battle freed Nicaea from Seljuk pressure, but Laskaris's army had suffered heavy casualties. In particular, his very effective, though headstrong, Latin mercenary cavalry had been almost destroyed. As a result, Laskaris could not adequately defend his territory from an attack by the Latin Empire of Constantinople; defeated at the Battle of the Rhyndacus, he had to cede some territory bordering the Sea of Marmara. The Nicaeans were compensated for this territorial loss when, in 1212, the death of David Komnenos allowed their annexation of his lands in Paphlagonia.

The victory at Antioch on the Meander gave Laskaris considerable prestige, and the capture of Alexios ended internal opposition to his rule. The battle was the last major encounter between the Seljuks and the Byzantines. Ultimately, the Seljuks had failed to take all of Asia Minor. However, even though the Nicaean Empire would strengthen (at the cost of the Latins) and the Seljuks would weaken, the Turks, under Ottoman leadership, would ultimately conquer Byzantine Asia Minor a little over 100 years later.
