= Gümüşyeniköy, Germencik =

Gümüşyeniköy
- Neighbourhood
- Country: Turkey
- Province: Aydın
- District: Germencik
- Population (2022): 229
- Time zone: UTC+3 (TRT)

Gümüşyeniköy is a neighbourhood in the municipality and district of Germencik, Aydın Province, Turkey. Its population is 229 (2022).
