= Örtülü, Bozdoğan =

Örtülü
- Neighbourhood
- Location in Turkey Örtülü (Turkey Aegean)
- Coordinates: 37.5494°N 28.4597°E
- Country: Turkey
- Province: Aydın
- District: Bozdoğan
- Population (2022): 577
- Time zone: UTC+3 (TRT)

Örtülü is a neighbourhood in the municipality and district of Bozdoğan, Aydın Province, Turkey. Its population is 577 (2022).
