= Karaahmetler, Bozdoğan =

Karaahmetler
- Neighbourhood
- Location in Turkey Karaahmetler (Turkey Aegean)
- Coordinates: 37.6833°N 28.4500°E
- Country: Turkey
- Province: Aydın
- District: Bozdoğan
- Population (2022): 299
- Time zone: UTC+3 (TRT)

Karaahmetler is a neighbourhood in the municipality and district of Bozdoğan, Aydın Province, Turkey. Its population is 299 (2022).
