= Alemler, Karacasu =

Alemler
- Neighbourhood
- Location in Turkey Alemler (Turkey Aegean)
- Coordinates: 37°45′N 28°35′E
- Country: Turkey
- Province: Aydın
- District: Karacasu
- Population (2022): 769
- Time zone: UTC+3 (TRT)

Alemler is a neighbourhood in the municipality and district of Karacasu, Aydın Province, Turkey. Last observed 2022, the current population of Karacasu is approximately 769.
