= Ovacık, Kuyucak =

Ovacık
- Neighbourhood
- Location in Turkey Ovacık (Turkey Aegean)
- Coordinates: 38.0667°N 28.5439°E
- Country: Turkey
- Province: Aydın
- District: Kuyucak
- Population (2022): 266
- Time zone: UTC+3 (TRT)

Ovacık is a neighbourhood in the municipality and district of Kuyucak, Aydın Province, Turkey. Its population was 266 as of 2022.
