= Görle, Karacasu =

Görle
- Neighbourhood
- Location in Turkey Görle (Turkey Aegean)
- Coordinates: 37°33′4″N 28°38′10″E
- Country: Turkey
- Province: Aydın
- District: Karacasu
- Population (2022): 190
- Time zone: UTC+3 (TRT)

Görle (also: Yukarı Görle) is a neighbourhood in the municipality and district of Karacasu, Aydın Province, Turkey. Its population is 190 (2022).
