= Ataköy, Karacasu =

Ataköy
- Neighbourhood
- Location in Turkey Ataköy (Turkey Aegean)
- Coordinates: 37.7389°N 28.6994°E
- Country: Turkey
- Province: Aydın
- District: Karacasu
- Population (2022): 1,073
- Time zone: UTC+3 (TRT)

Ataköy is a neighbourhood in the municipality and district of Karacasu, Aydın Province, Turkey. Its population is 1,073 (2022).
