= Cuma, Karacasu =

Village in Turkey

Cuma
- Neighbourhood
- Location in Turkey Cuma (Turkey Aegean)
- Coordinates: 37°43′27″N 28°36′31″E
- Country: Turkey
- Province: Aydın
- District: Karacasu
- Population (2024): 936
- Time zone: UTC+3 (TRT)

Cuma is a neighbourhood in the municipality and district of Karacasu, Aydın Province, Turkey. Its population is 936 (2024).
