= Neşetiye, Germencik =

Neşetiye
- Neighbourhood
- Location in Turkey Neşetiye (Turkey Aegean)
- Coordinates: 37°53′N 27°33′E
- Country: Turkey
- Province: Aydın
- District: Germencik
- Population (2022): 2,172
- Time zone: UTC+3 (TRT)

Neşetiye is a neighbourhood in the municipality and district of Germencik, Aydın Province, Turkey. Its population was 2,172 (2022).
