= Yöre, Kuyucak =

Yöre
- Neighbourhood
- Location in Turkey Yöre (Turkey Aegean)
- Coordinates: 37°57′N 28°32′E
- Country: Turkey
- Province: Aydın
- District: Kuyucak
- Population (2022): 656
- Time zone: UTC+3 (TRT)

Yöre Yöre is a neighborhood in the municipality and district of Kuyucak, in Aydın Province, Turkey. Its population was 656 in 2022.
