= Dampınar, Germencik =

Dampınar
- Neighbourhood
- Location in Turkey Dampınar (Turkey Aegean)
- Coordinates: 37°59′N 27°35′E
- Country: Turkey
- Province: Aydın
- District: Germencik
- Population (2022): 302
- Time zone: UTC+3 (TRT)

Dampınar is a neighbourhood in the municipality and district of Germencik, Aydın Province, Turkey. Its population is 302 (2022).
