= Güzelköy, Karacasu =

Güzelköy
- Neighbourhood
- Country: Turkey
- Province: Aydın
- District: Karacasu
- Population (2022): 90
- Time zone: UTC+3 (TRT)

Güzelköy is a neighbourhood in the municipality and district of Karacasu, Aydın Province, Turkey. Its population is 90 (2022).
