= Köprübaşı, Manisa =

Köprübaşı
- District and municipality
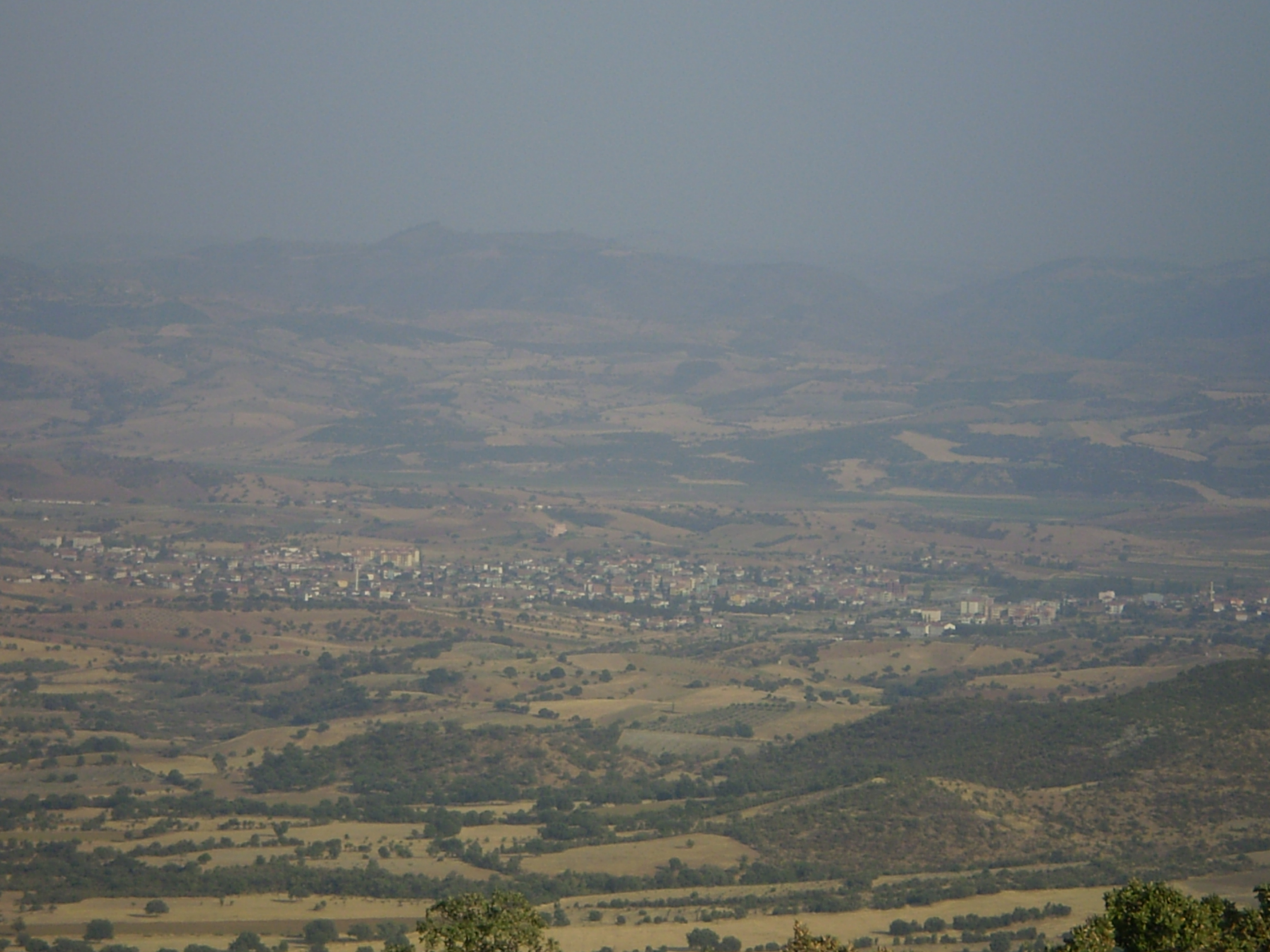

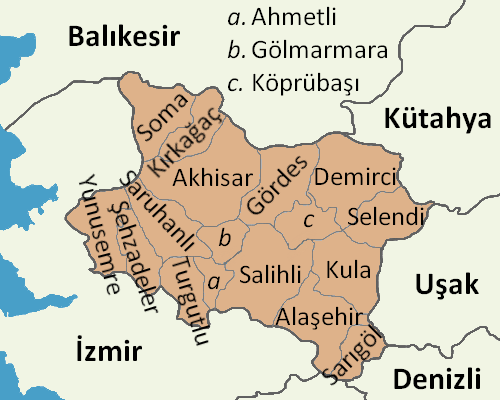
- Map showing Köprübaşı District in Manisa Province

- Location within Turkey Location within Turkey Aegean
- Coordinates: 38°44′59″N 28°24′17″E
- Country: Turkey
- Province: Manisa

Government
  - Mayor: Fatih Taşlı (CHP)
- Area: 447 km^{2} (173 sq mi)
- Elevation: 252 m (827 ft)
- Population (2022): 12,730
  - Density: 28.5/km^{2} (73.8/sq mi)
- Time zone: UTC+3 (TRT)
- Postal code: 45930
- Area code: 0236

Köprübaşı is a municipality and district of Manisa Province, Turkey. Its area is 447 km^{2}, and its population is 12,730 (2022). The town lies at an elevation of 252 m (827 ft). At the 2013 reorganisation, it absorbed part of the district of Demirci.

== Composition ==
There are 49 neighbourhoods in Köprübaşı District:

- Akçaalan
- Alanyolu
- Armağan
- Arpacı
- Atatürk
- Avşar
- Azimli
- Borlu
- Bozburun
- Çamyurdu
- Çarıklar
- Çavullar
- Çayköy
- Cıcıklı
- Döğüşeren
- Esat
- Gökveliler
- Gölbaşı
- Gülpınar
- Gündoğdu
- İkizkuyu
- Karabük
- Karaelmacık
- Karyağdı
- Kasar
- Kavakyeri
- Kemhallı
- Kıdırcık
- Killik
- Kınık
- Kıranşeyh
- Kozaklı
- Kulalı
- Kurtlar
- Mehmet Akif Ersoy
- Mestanlı
- Namık Kemal
- Rağıllar
- Saraycık
- Sargaç
- Selviler
- Temrek
- Tokmaklı
- Uğurlu
- Yabacı
- Yardere
- Yenice
- Yeşilköy
- Yumuklar
