= Dağkaraağaç, Germencik =

Dağkaraağaç
- Neighbourhood
- Location in Turkey Dağkaraağaç (Turkey Aegean)
- Coordinates: 37°54′N 27°36′E
- Country: Turkey
- Province: Aydın
- District: Germencik
- Population (2022): 173
- Time zone: UTC+3 (TRT)

Dağkaraağaç is a neighbourhood in the municipality and district of Germencik, Aydın Province, Turkey. Its population is 173 (2022).
