= Yaylalı, Kuyucak =

Yaylalı
- Neighbourhood
- Country: Turkey
- Province: Aydın
- District: Kuyucak
- Population (2022): 255
- Time zone: UTC+3 (TRT)

Yaylalı is a neighbourhood in the municipality and district of Kuyucak, Aydın Province, Turkey. Its population is 255 (2022).
