= Aksaz, Kuyucak =

Aksaz
- Neighbourhood
- Location in Turkey Aksaz (Turkey Aegean)
- Coordinates: 37.8599°N 28.6732°E
- Country: Turkey
- Province: Aydın
- District: Kuyucak
- Population (2022): 356
- Time zone: UTC+3 (TRT)

Aksaz is a neighbourhood in the municipality and district of Kuyucak, Aydın Province, Turkey. Its population is 356 (2022).
