= Antioch on the Maeander =

Human settlement

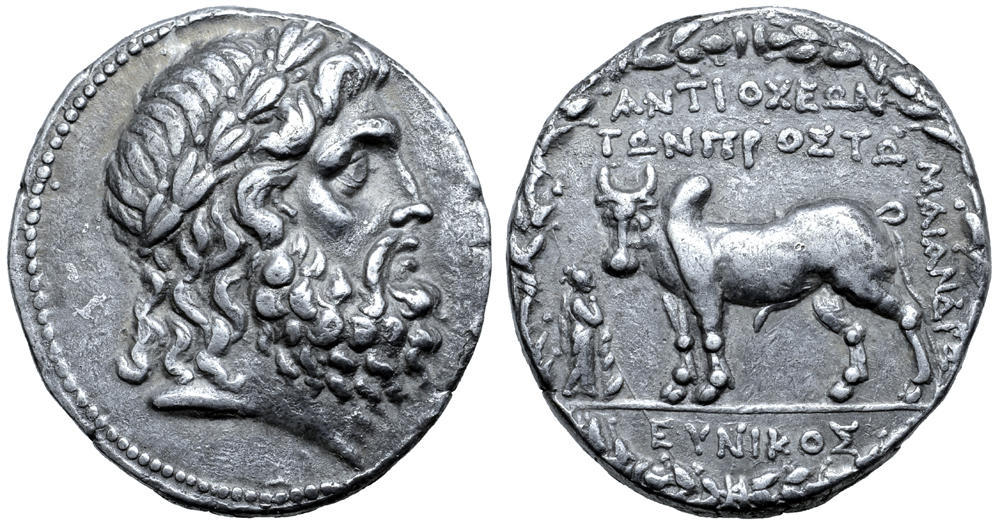
- coin from Antioch on the Maeander

- Location within Turkey
- 37.873333°N 28.547222°E
- Location: Aydın Province, Turkey

Antioch on the Maeander or Antiochia on the Maeander (Greek: Ἀντιόχεια τοῦ Μαιάνδρου; Latin: Antiochia ad Maeandrum), earlier Pythopolis, was a city of ancient Caria, in Anatolia, in modern-day Turkey. The city was situated between the Maeander and Orsinus rivers near their confluence. Though it was the site of a bridge over the Maeander, it had "little or no individual history". The scanty ruins are located on a hill (named, in Turkish, Yenişer) a few kilometers southeast of Kuyucak in Turkey's Aydın Province, near the modern city of Başaran, or the village of Aliağaçiftliği. The city already existed when Antiochus I enlarged and renamed it. It was home to the sophist Diotrephes.

The Venus de Milo is believed to have been sculpted by a citizen of Antioch named [...]andros (possibly Alexandros).

In 1148 the army of the Second Crusade forced a passage of the Maeander at Antioch in the face of determined Turkish resistance in the Battle of the Meander. In 1176 the city was plundered by the Turks In 1211 the city was the site of the Battle of Antioch on the Meander between the Byzantine rump Empire of Nicaea and the Seljuk Sultanate of Rûm.

The town has not been excavated, although Christopher Ratté and others visited the site in 1994 and produced a sketch plan. They observed a well-fortified Byzantine site, occupying some 60 to 70 hectares (150 to 170 acres). The remains of a Roman stadium 200 metres (660 ft) in length are also visible.

== Bishopric ==
The bishopric of Antioch on the Maeander was a suffragan of the metropolitan see of Stauropolis, capital of the Roman province of Caria. Its bishop Eusebius was at the First Council of Nicaea in 325, Dionysius at the Council of Chalcedon in 451, Georgius at the Trullan Council in 692, and Theophanes at the Photian Council of Constantinople (879). Menophanes was deposed in 518 for Monophysitism. By the reign of Michael VIII Palaiologos it had been elevated to a metropolitan see of its own. In 1369, it was assumed by Stauropolis, because of its decline, as a result of the threat posed by the Anatolian Beyliks.

No longer a residential bishopric, Antioch on the Maeander (Antiochia ad Maeandrum in Latin) is today listed by the Catholic Church as a titular see.

=== Known Bishops ===
- Vicente de Paulo Araújo Matos (21 Apr 1955 Appointed - 28 Jan 1961)
- Félix Guiller (10 Apr 1961 Appointed - 10 Jun 1963)
- Edward Louis Fedders, (29 Oct 1963 Appointed - 11 Mar 1973)

== See also ==
- List of ancient Greek cities

== Bibliography ==
- Blue Guide, Turkey: The Aegean and Mediterranean Coasts (ISBN 0-393-30489-2), p. 359.
