= Yedieylül, Germencik =

Village in Turkey

Yedieylül
- Neighbourhood
- Location in Turkey Yedieylül (Turkey Aegean)
- Coordinates: 37°52′27″N 27°36′16″E
- Country: Turkey
- Province: Aydın
- District: Germencik
- Population (2024): 1,693
- Time zone: UTC+3 (TRT)

Yedieylül is a neighbourhood in the municipality and district of Germencik, Aydın Province, Turkey. Its population is 1,693 (2024).
