= Pınarlı, Bozdoğan =

Pınarlı
- Neighbourhood
- Country: Turkey
- Province: Aydın
- District: Bozdoğan
- Population (2022): 469
- Time zone: UTC+3 (TRT)

Pınarlı is a neighbourhood in the municipality and district of Bozdoğan, Aydın Province, Turkey. Its population is 469 (2022).
