= Yazır, Karacasu =

Yazır
- Neighbourhood
- Location in Turkey Yazır (Turkey Aegean)
- Coordinates: 37.6865°N 28.6207°E
- Country: Turkey
- Province: Aydın
- District: Karacasu
- Population (2022): 389
- Time zone: UTC+3 (TRT)

Yazır is a neighbourhood in the municipality and district of Karacasu, Aydın Province, Turkey. Its population is 389 (2022).
