= Yeşil Yenice =

- Neighbourhood
- Location in Turkey Yeşil Yenice (Turkey Aegean)
- Coordinates: 37°38′46″N 28°31′19″E
- Country: Turkey
- Province: Aydın
- District: Bozdoğan
- Population (2022): 210
- Time zone: UTC+3 (TRT)

Yeşil Yenice (formerly: Yenice) is a neighbourhood in the municipality and district of Bozdoğan, Aydın Province, Turkey. Its population is 210 (2022). In 2013 villages in the province changed to the mahalle (neighbourhood) form of local government; there was already a neighbourhood with the same name in Bozdoğan so from 2014 the village became Yeşil Yenice.
