= Amasya, Bozdoğan =

Amasya
- Neighbourhood
- Location in Turkey Amasya (Turkey Aegean)
- Coordinates: 37°36′43″N 28°28′44″E
- Country: Turkey
- Province: Aydın
- District: Bozdoğan
- Population (2022): 487
- Time zone: UTC+3 (TRT)

Amasya is a neighbourhood in the municipality and district of Bozdoğan, Aydın Province, Turkey. Its population is 487 (2022).
