= Tütüncüler, Bozdoğan =

Tütüncüler
- Neighbourhood
- Country: Turkey
- Province: Aydın
- District: Bozdoğan
- Population (2022): 282
- Time zone: UTC+3 (TRT)

Tütüncüler is a neighbourhood in the municipality and district of Bozdoğan, Aydın Province, Turkey. Its population is 282 (2022).
