= Kayran, Kuyucak =

Kayran
- Neighbourhood
- Location in Turkey Kayran (Turkey Aegean)
- Coordinates: 37.9833°N 28.5333°E
- Country: Turkey
- Province: Aydın
- District: Kuyucak
- Population (2022): 653
- Time zone: UTC+3 (TRT)

Kayran is a neighbourhood in the municipality and district of Kuyucak, Aydın Province, Turkey. Its population is 653 (2022).
