= Aşağıgörle, Karacasu =

Aşağıgörle
- Neighbourhood
- Location in Turkey Aşağıgörle (Turkey Aegean)
- Coordinates: 37°33′N 28°37′E
- Country: Turkey
- Province: Aydın
- District: Karacasu
- Population (2022): 157
- Time zone: UTC+3 (TRT)

Aşağıgörle is a neighbourhood in the municipality and district of Karacasu, Aydın Province, Turkey. Its population is 157 (2022).
