= Güre, Bozdoğan =

Güre
- Neighbourhood
- Country: Turkey
- Province: Aydın
- District: Bozdoğan
- Population (2022): 204
- Time zone: UTC+3 (TRT)

Güre is a neighbourhood in the municipality and district of Bozdoğan, Aydın Province, Turkey. Its population is 204 (2022).
