= Mesudiye, Germencik =

Village in Turkey

Mesudiye
- Neighbourhood
- Location in Turkey Mesudiye (Turkey Aegean)
- Coordinates: 37°52′10″N 27°36′32″E
- Country: Turkey
- Province: Aydın
- District: Germencik
- Population (2024): 1,734
- Time zone: UTC+3 (TRT)

Mesudiye is a neighbourhood in the municipality and district of Germencik, Aydın Province, Turkey. Its population is 1,734 (2024).
