= Karaağaçlı, Germencik =

Karaağaçlı
- Neighbourhood
- Location in Turkey Karaağaçlı (Turkey Aegean)
- Coordinates: 37.8167°N 27.5833°E
- Country: Turkey
- Province: Aydın
- District: Germencik
- Population (2022): 338
- Time zone: UTC+3 (TRT)

Karaağaçlı is a neighbourhood in the municipality and district of Germencik, Aydın Province, Turkey. Its population is 338 (2022).
