= Bahçeköy, Karacasu =

Bahçeköy
- Neighbourhood
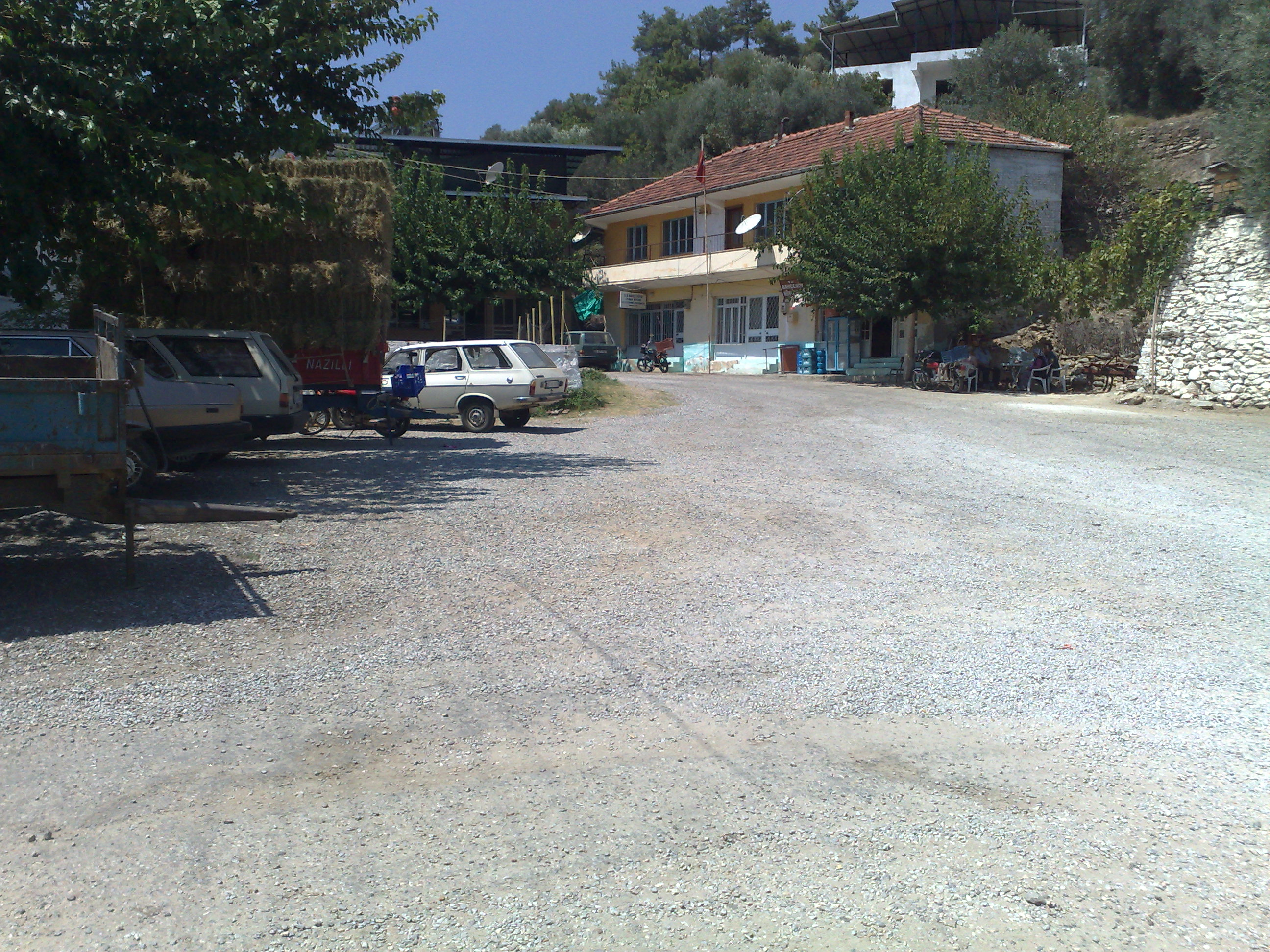

- Location within Turkey Location within Turkey Aegean
- Coordinates: 37.8229°N 28.5468°E
- Country: Turkey
- Province: Aydın
- District: Karacasu
- Population (2022): 203
- Time zone: UTC+3 (TRT)

Bahçeköy is a neighbourhood in the municipality and district of Karacasu, Aydın Province, Turkey. Its population is 203 (2022).
