= Camikebir, Germencik =

Village in Turkey

Camikebir
- Neighbourhood
- Location in Turkey Camikebir (Turkey Aegean)
- Coordinates: 37°52′14″N 27°36′10″E
- Country: Turkey
- Province: Aydın
- District: Germencik
- Population (2024): 3,571
- Time zone: UTC+3 (TRT)

Camikebir is a neighbourhood in the municipality and district of Germencik, Aydın Province, Turkey. Its population is 3,571 (2024).
