= İğdecik, Kuyucak =

İğdecik
- Neighbourhood
- Country: Turkey
- Province: Aydın
- District: Kuyucak
- Population (2022): 58
- Time zone: UTC+3 (TRT)

İğdecik is a neighbourhood in the municipality and district of Kuyucak, Aydın Province, Turkey. Its population is 58 (2022).
