= Bereketli, Karacasu =

Village in Turkey

Bereketli
- Neighbourhood
- Location in Turkey Bereketli (Turkey Aegean)
- Coordinates: 37°44′2″N 28°34′52″E
- Country: Turkey
- Province: Aydın
- District: Karacasu
- Population (2024): 276
- Time zone: UTC+3 (TRT)

Bereketli is a neighbourhood in the municipality and district of Karacasu, Aydın Province, Turkey. Its population is 276 (2024).
