= Mustafapaşa, Kuyucak =

Village in Turkey

Mustafapaşa
- Neighbourhood
- Location in Turkey Mustafapaşa (Turkey Aegean)
- Coordinates: 37°55′11″N 28°27′04″E
- Country: Turkey
- Province: Aydın
- District: Kuyucak
- Population (2024): 825
- Time zone: UTC+3 (TRT)

Mustafapaşa is a neighbourhood in the municipality and district of Kuyucak, Aydın Province, Turkey. Its population is 825 (2024).
