= Reisköy, Germencik =

Reisköy
- Neighbourhood
- Location in Turkey Reisköy (Turkey Aegean)
- Coordinates: 37°50′N 27°36′E
- Country: Turkey
- Province: Aydın
- District: Germencik
- Population (2022): 366
- Time zone: UTC+3 (TRT)

Reisköy is a neighbourhood in the municipality and district of Germencik, Aydın Province, Turkey. Its population is 366 (2022).
