= Pamucak, Kuyucak =

Pamucak
- Neighbourhood
- Location in Turkey Pamucak (Turkey Aegean)
- Coordinates: 37.9611°N 28.5550°E
- Country: Turkey
- Province: Aydın
- District: Kuyucak
- Population (2022): 117
- Time zone: UTC+3 (TRT)

Pamucak is a neighbourhood in the municipality and district of Kuyucak, Aydın Province, Turkey. Its population is 117 (2022).
