= Balatçık, Germencik =

Balatçık
- Neighbourhood
- Location in Turkey Balatçık (Turkey Aegean)
- Coordinates: 37.9094°N 27.4883°E
- Country: Turkey
- Province: Aydın
- District: Germencik
- Population (2022): 507
- Time zone: UTC+3 (TRT)

Balatçık is a neighbourhood in the municipality and district of Germencik, Aydın Province, Turkey. Its population is 507 (2022).
