= Karabağlar, Karacasu =

Karabağlar
- Neighbourhood
- Country: Turkey
- Province: Aydın
- District: Karacasu
- Population (2022): 69
- Time zone: UTC+3 (TRT)

Karabağlar is a neighbourhood in the municipality and district of Karacasu, Aydın Province, Turkey. Its population was 69 in 2022.
