= Alhisar, Bozdoğan =

Alhisar
- Neighbourhood
- Location in Turkey Alhisar (Turkey Aegean)
- Coordinates: 37°37′N 28°22′E
- Country: Turkey
- Province: Aydın
- District: Bozdoğan
- Population (2022): 215
- Time zone: UTC+3 (TRT)

Alhisar is a neighbourhood in the municipality and district of Bozdoğan, Aydın Province, Turkey. Its population is 215 (2022).
