= Hacıhıdırlar, Karacasu =

Hacıhıdırlar
- Neighbourhood
- Location in Turkey Hacıhıdırlar (Turkey Aegean)
- Coordinates: 37°46′N 28°41′E
- Country: Turkey
- Province: Aydın
- District: Karacasu
- Population (2022): 109
- Time zone: UTC+3 (TRT)

Hacıhıdırlar is a neighbourhood in the municipality and district of Karacasu, Aydın Province, Turkey. Its population is 109 (2022).
