= Çamarası, Karacasu =

Çamarası
- Neighbourhood
- Location in Turkey Çamarası (Turkey Aegean)
- Coordinates: 37.6507°N 28.7012°E
- Country: Turkey
- Province: Aydın
- District: Karacasu
- Population (2022): 83
- Time zone: UTC+3 (TRT)

Çamarası is a neighbourhood in the municipality and district of Karacasu, Aydın Province, Turkey. Its population is 83 (2022).
