= Kamışlar, Bozdoğan =

Kamışlar
- Neighbourhood
- Location in Turkey Kamışlar (Turkey Aegean)
- Coordinates: 37.6500°N 28.3333°E
- Country: Turkey
- Province: Aydın
- District: Bozdoğan
- Population (2022): 432
- Time zone: UTC+3 (TRT)

Kamışlar is a neighborhood in the municipality and district of Bozdoğan, Aydın Province, Turkey. Its population is 432 (2022). It was formerly a village of Bozdoğan, but in 2012 became a neighborhood of Bozdoğan, because Aydın became a metropolitan municipality.
