= Naipli, Germencik =

Naipli
- Neighbourhood
- Location in Turkey Naipli (Turkey Aegean)
- Coordinates: 37.8667°N 27.4667°E
- Country: Turkey
- Province: Aydın
- District: Germencik
- Population (2022): 182
- Time zone: UTC+3 (TRT)

Naipli is a neighbourhood in the municipality and district of Germencik, Aydın Province, Turkey. Its population is 182 (2022).
