= Yaykın, Karacasu =

Yaykın
- Neighbourhood
- Location in Turkey Yaykın (Turkey Aegean)
- Coordinates: 37°36′18″N 28°35′02″E
- Country: Turkey
- Province: Aydın
- District: Karacasu
- Population (2022): 633
- Time zone: UTC+3 (TRT)

Yaykın is a neighbourhood in the municipality and district of Karacasu, Aydın Province, Turkey. Its population was 633 (2022).
