= Örmepınar, Bozdoğan =

Örmepınar
- Neighbourhood
- Location in Turkey Örmepınar (Turkey Aegean)
- Coordinates: 37°35′N 28°29′E
- Country: Turkey
- Province: Aydın
- District: Bozdoğan
- Population (2022): 354
- Time zone: UTC+3 (TRT)

Örmepınar is a neighbourhood in the municipality and district of Bozdoğan, Aydın Province, Turkey. Its population is 354 (2022).
