= Kızılcagedik, Germencik =

Kızılcagedik
- Neighbourhood
- Location in Turkey Kızılcagedik (Turkey Aegean)
- Coordinates: 37°54′N 27°39′E
- Country: Turkey
- Province: Aydın
- District: Germencik
- Population (2022): 91
- Time zone: UTC+3 (TRT)

Kızılcagedik is a neighbourhood in the municipality and district of Germencik, Aydın Province, Turkey. Its population is 91 (2022).
