= Ören, Kuyucak =

Ören
- Neighbourhood
- Country: Turkey
- Province: Aydın
- District: Kuyucak
- Population (2022): 78
- Time zone: UTC+3 (TRT)

Ören is a neighbourhood in the municipality and district of Kuyucak, Aydın Province, Turkey. Its population is 78 (2022).
