= Çamlıdere, Bozdoğan =

Çamlıdere
- Neighbourhood
- Location in Turkey Çamlıdere (Turkey Aegean)
- Coordinates: 37°36′36″N 28°25′59″E
- Country: Turkey
- Province: Aydın
- District: Bozdoğan
- Population (2022): 747
- Time zone: UTC+3 (TRT)

Çamlıdere is a neighbourhood in the municipality and district of Bozdoğan, Aydın Province, Turkey. Its population is 747 (2022).
