= Güzelbeyli, Karacasu =

Güzelbeyli
- Neighbourhood
- Location in Turkey Güzelbeyli (Turkey Aegean)
- Coordinates: 37°42′14″N 28°40′55″E
- Country: Turkey
- Province: Aydın
- District: Karacasu
- Population (2022): 254
- Time zone: UTC+3 (TRT)

Güzelbeyli is a neighbourhood in the municipality and district of Karacasu, Aydın Province, Turkey. Its population is 254 (2022).
