= Kurtuluş, Kuyucak =

Kurtuluş
- Neighbourhood
- Location in Turkey Kurtuluş (Turkey Aegean)
- Coordinates: 37°54′52″N 28°27′13″E
- Country: Turkey
- Province: Aydın
- District: Kuyucak
- Population (2022): 807
- Time zone: UTC+3 (TRT)

Kurtuluş is a neighbourhood of the municipality and district of Kuyucak, Aydın Province, Turkey. Its population is 807 (2022).
