= Belenova, Kuyucak =

Belenova
- Neighbourhood
- Location in Turkey Belenova (Turkey Aegean)
- Coordinates: 38°02′N 28°33′E
- Country: Turkey
- Province: Aydın
- District: Kuyucak
- Population (2022): 205
- Time zone: UTC+3 (TRT)

Belenova is a neighbourhood in the municipality and district of Kuyucak, Aydın Province, Turkey. Its population is 205 (2022).
