= Ziyaretli, Bozdoğan =

Ziyaretli
- Neighbourhood
- Location in Turkey Ziyaretli (Turkey Aegean)
- Coordinates: 37°41′9″N 28°17′49″E
- Country: Turkey
- Province: Aydın
- District: Bozdoğan
- Population (2022): 488
- Time zone: UTC+3 (TRT)

Ziyaretli is a neighbourhood in the municipality and district of Bozdoğan, Aydın Province, Turkey. Its population is 488 (2022).
