= Eymir, Bozdoğan =

Village in Turkey

Eymir
- Neighbourhood
- Country: Turkey
- Province: Aydın
- District: Bozdoğan
- Population (2024): 492
- Time zone: UTC+3 (TRT)

Eymir is a neighbourhood in the municipality and district of Bozdoğan, Aydın Province, Turkey. Its population is 492 (2024).
