= Dağyeni, Germencik =

Dağyeni
- Neighbourhood
- Location in Turkey Dağyeni (Turkey Aegean)
- Coordinates: 37°59′N 27°33′E
- Country: Turkey
- Province: Aydın
- District: Germencik
- Population (2022): 854
- Time zone: UTC+3 (TRT)

Dağyeni is a neighbourhood in the municipality and district of Germencik, Aydın Province, Turkey. Its population is 854 (2022).
