= Işıklar, Karacasu =

Işıklar
- Neighbourhood
- Location in Turkey Işıklar (Turkey Aegean)
- Coordinates: 37.7489°N 28.7361°E
- Country: Turkey
- Province: Aydın
- District: Karacasu
- Population (2022): 450
- Time zone: UTC+3 (TRT)

Işıklar is a neighbourhood in the municipality and district of Karacasu, Aydın Province, Turkey. Its population is 450 (2022).
