= Akseki, Bozdoğan =

Akseki
- Neighbourhood
- Location in Turkey Akseki (Turkey Aegean)
- Coordinates: 37.6261°N 28.5328°E
- Country: Turkey
- Province: Aydın
- District: Bozdoğan
- Population (2022): 343
- Time zone: UTC+3 (TRT)

Akseki is a neighbourhood in the municipality and district of Bozdoğan, Aydın Province, Turkey. Its population is 343 (2022).
