= Yeni, Kuyucak =

Village in Turkey

Yeni
- Neighbourhood
- Location in Turkey Yeni (Turkey Aegean)
- Coordinates: 37°54′38″N 28°27′11″E
- Country: Turkey
- Province: Aydın
- District: Kuyucak
- Population (2024): 2,253
- Time zone: UTC+3 (TRT)

Yeni is a neighbourhood in the municipality and district of Kuyucak, Aydın Province, Turkey. Its population is 2,253 (2024).
