= Gencellidere, Kuyucak =

Gencellidere
- Neighbourhood
- Location in Turkey Gencellidere (Turkey Aegean)
- Coordinates: 37°59′N 28°38′E
- Country: Turkey
- Province: Aydın
- District: Kuyucak
- Population (2022): 650
- Time zone: UTC+3 (TRT)

Gencellidere is a neighbourhood in the municipality and district of Kuyucak, Aydın Province, Turkey. Its population is 650 (2022).
