= Merkez Beşeylül =

Village in Turkey

- Neighbourhood
- Location in Turkey Merkez Beşeylül (Turkey Aegean)
- Coordinates: 37°55′31″N 28°25′33″E
- Country: Turkey
- Province: Aydın
- District: Kuyucak
- Population (2024): 340
- Time zone: UTC+3 (TRT)

Merkez Beşeylül is a neighbourhood in the municipality and district of Kuyucak, Aydın Province, Turkey. Its population is 340 (2024).
