= Moralı, Germencik =

Moralı
- Neighbourhood
- Country: Turkey
- Province: Aydın
- District: Germencik
- Population (2022): 355
- Time zone: UTC+3 (TRT)

Moralı is a neighbourhood in the municipality and district of Germencik, Aydın Province, Turkey. Its population is 355 (2022).
