= Dedeler, Karacasu =

Dedeler
- Neighbourhood
- Location in Turkey Dedeler (Turkey Aegean)
- Coordinates: 37.7667°N 28.7000°E
- Country: Turkey
- Province: Aydın
- District: Karacasu
- Population (2022): 107
- Time zone: UTC+3 (TRT)

Dedeler is a neighbourhood in the municipality and district of Karacasu, Aydın Province, Turkey. Its population was 107 as at the 2022 census.
