= Sarıcaova, Kuyucak =

Sarıcaova
- Neighbourhood
- Country: Turkey
- Province: Aydın
- District: Kuyucak
- Population (2022): 358
- Time zone: UTC+3 (TRT)

Sarıcaova is a neighbourhood in the municipality and district of Kuyucak, Aydın Province, Turkey. Its population is 358 (2022). The village is inhabited by Tahtacı.
