= Dereköy, Karacasu =

Dereköy
- Neighbourhood
- Location in Turkey Dereköy (Turkey Aegean)
- Coordinates: 37.7669°N 28.5838°E
- Country: Turkey
- Province: Aydın
- District: Karacasu
- Population (2022): 226
- Time zone: UTC+3 (TRT)

Dereköy is a neighbourhood in the municipality and district of Karacasu, Aydın Province, Turkey. Its population was 226 as of 2022.
