= Yakuppaşa, Kuyucak =

Village in Turkey

Yakuppaşa
- Neighbourhood
- Location in Turkey Yakuppaşa (Turkey Aegean)
- Coordinates: 37°54′56″N 28°27′36″E
- Country: Turkey
- Province: Aydın
- District: Kuyucak
- Population (2024): 355
- Time zone: UTC+3 (TRT)

Yakuppaşa is a neighbourhood in the municipality and district of Kuyucak, Aydın Province, Turkey. Its population is 355 (2024).
