= Körteke, Bozdoğan =

Körteke
- Neighbourhood
- Location in Turkey Körteke (Turkey Aegean)
- Coordinates: 37°29′N 28°32′E
- Country: Turkey
- Province: Aydın
- District: Bozdoğan
- Population (2022): 304
- Time zone: UTC+3 (TRT)

Körteke is a neighbourhood in the municipality and district of Bozdoğan, Aydın Province, Turkey. Its population is 304 (2022).
