= Madran, Bozdoğan =

Village in Turkey

Madran
- Neighbourhood
- Country: Turkey
- Province: Aydın
- District: Bozdoğan
- Population (2024): 596
- Time zone: UTC+3 (TRT)

Madran is a neighbourhood in the municipality and district of Bozdoğan, Aydın Province, Turkey. Its population is 596 (2024).
