= Çamköy, Karacasu =

Çamköy
- Neighbourhood
- Location in Turkey Çamköy (Turkey Aegean)
- Coordinates: 37.8057°N 28.5622°E
- Country: Turkey
- Province: Aydın
- District: Karacasu
- Population (2022): 422
- Time zone: UTC+3 (TRT)

Çamköy is a neighbourhood in the municipality and district of Karacasu, Aydın Province, Turkey. Its population is 422 (2022).
