= Turanlar, Germencik =

Turanlar
- Neighbourhood
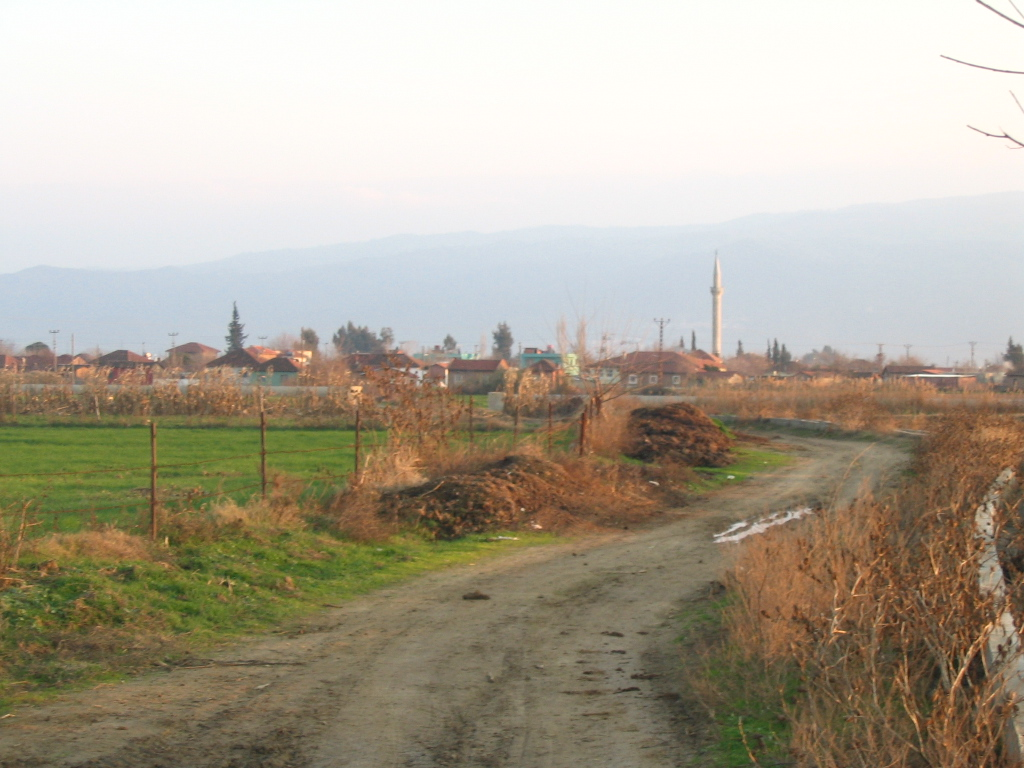

- Location within Turkey Location within Turkey Aegean
- Coordinates: 37°50′02″N 27°37′15″E
- Country: Turkey
- Province: Aydın
- District: Germencik
- Population (2022): 961
- Time zone: UTC+3 (TRT)

Turanlar is a neighbourhood in the municipality and district of Germencik, Aydın Province, Turkey. Its population is 961 (2022).
