= Habibler, Germencik =

Habibler
- Neighbourhood
- Location in Turkey Habibler (Turkey Aegean)
- Coordinates: 37.99090°N 27.59665°E
- Country: Turkey
- Province: Aydın
- District: Germencik
- Population (2022): 164
- Time zone: UTC+3 (TRT)

Habibler is a neighborhood in the municipality and district of Germencik, Aydın Province, Turkey. Its population is 164 (2022).
