= Dömen, Bozdoğan =

Dömen
- Neighbourhood
- Country: Turkey
- Province: Aydın
- District: Bozdoğan
- Population (2022): 193
- Time zone: UTC+3 (TRT)

Dömen (also: Dümen) is a neighbourhood in the municipality and district of Bozdoğan, Aydın Province, Turkey. Its population is 193 (2022).
