= Tekin, Germencik =

Tekin
- Neighbourhood
- Location in Turkey Tekin (Turkey Aegean)
- Coordinates: 37°51′18″N 27°31′55″E
- Country: Turkey
- Province: Aydın
- District: Germencik
- Population (2022): 226
- Time zone: UTC+3 (TRT)

Tekin is a neighbourhood in the municipality and district of Germencik, Aydın Province, Turkey. Its population is 226 (2022). The ruins of ancient Magnesia on the Maeander are near Tekin. The village is inhabited by Tahtacı.
