= Cabi, Karacasu =

Village in Turkey

Cabi
- Neighbourhood
- Location in Turkey Cabi (Turkey Aegean)
- Coordinates: 37°43′38″N 28°36′06″E
- Country: Turkey
- Province: Aydın
- District: Karacasu
- Population (2024): 1,194
- Time zone: UTC+3 (TRT)

Cabi is a neighbourhood in the municipality and district of Karacasu, Aydın Province, Turkey. Its population is 1,194 (2024).
