= Cumhuriyet, Kuyucak =

Village in Turkey

Cumhuriyet
- Neighbourhood
- Location in Turkey Cumhuriyet (Turkey Aegean)
- Coordinates: 37°55′0″N 28°27′30″E
- Country: Turkey
- Province: Aydın
- District: Kuyucak
- Population (2024): 641
- Time zone: UTC+3 (TRT)

Cumhuriyet is a neighbourhood in the municipality and district of Kuyucak, Aydın Province, Turkey. Its population is 641 (2024).
