= Yeniköy, Bozdoğan =

Yeniköy
- Neighbourhood
- Location in Turkey Yeniköy (Turkey Aegean)
- Coordinates: 37.7333°N 28.3167°E
- Country: Turkey
- Province: Aydın
- District: Bozdoğan
- Population (2022): 180
- Time zone: UTC+3 (TRT)

Yeniköy is a neighbourhood in the municipality and district of Bozdoğan, Aydın Province, Turkey. Its population is 180 (2022).
