= Çarşı, Bozdoğan =

Village in Turkey

Çarşı
- Neighbourhood
- Location in Turkey Çarşı (Turkey Aegean)
- Coordinates: 37°40′22″N 28°18′41″E
- Country: Turkey
- Province: Aydın
- District: Bozdoğan
- Population (2024): 2,702
- Time zone: UTC+3 (TRT)

Çarşı is a neighbourhood in the municipality and district of Bozdoğan, Aydın Province, Turkey. Its population is 2,702 (2024).
