= Güneyköy, Bozdoğan =

Güneyköy
- Neighbourhood
- Location in Turkey Güneyköy (Turkey Aegean)
- Coordinates: 37.7144°N 28.2161°E
- Country: Turkey
- Province: Aydın
- District: Bozdoğan
- Population (2022): 429
- Time zone: UTC+3 (TRT)

Güneyköy (also: Güney) is a neighbourhood in the municipality and district of Bozdoğan, Aydın Province, Turkey. Its population is 429 (2022).
