= İstasyon, Germencik =

Village in Turkey

İstasyon
- Neighbourhood
- Location in Turkey İstasyon (Turkey Aegean)
- Coordinates: 37°52′32″N 27°35′49″E
- Country: Turkey
- Province: Aydın
- District: Germencik
- Population (2024): 2,557
- Time zone: UTC+3 (TRT)

İstasyon is a neighbourhood in the municipality and district of Germencik, Aydın Province, Turkey. Its population is 2,557 (2024).
