= Ömerbeyli, Germencik =

Ömerbeyli
- Neighbourhood
- Location in Turkey Ömerbeyli (Turkey Aegean)
- Coordinates: 37.8806°N 27.6633°E
- Country: Turkey
- Province: Aydın
- District: Germencik
- Population (2022): 586
- Time zone: UTC+3 (TRT)

Ömerbeyli is a neighbourhood in the municipality and district of Germencik, Aydın Province, Turkey. Its population is 586 (2022).
