= Akçay, Bozdoğan =

Village in Turkey

Akçay
- Neighbourhood
- Location in Turkey Akçay (Turkey Aegean)
- Coordinates: 37°41′10″N 28°19′12″E
- Country: Turkey
- Province: Aydın
- District: Bozdoğan
- Population (2024): 833
- Time zone: UTC+3 (TRT)

Akçay is a neighbourhood in the municipality and district of Bozdoğan, Aydın Province, Turkey. Its population is 833 (2024).
