= Beşeylül, Kuyucak =

Beşeylül
- Neighbourhood
- Location in Turkey Beşeylül (Turkey Aegean)
- Coordinates: 37°55′34″N 28°25′37″E
- Country: Turkey
- Province: Aydın
- District: Kuyucak
- Population (2022): 1,491
- Time zone: UTC+3 (TRT)

Beşeylül is a neighbourhood in the municipality and district of Kuyucak, Aydın Province, Turkey. Its population is 1,491 (2022).
