= Altıntaş, Bozdoğan =

Altıntaş
- Neighbourhood
- Location in Turkey Altıntaş (Turkey Aegean)
- Coordinates: 37°37′05″N 28°18′36″E
- Country: Turkey
- Province: Aydın
- District: Bozdoğan
- Population (2022): 1,272
- Time zone: UTC+3 (TRT)

Altıntaş is a neighbourhood in the municipality and district of Bozdoğan, Aydın Province, Turkey. Its population is 1,272 (2022).
