= Kızılcapınar, Germencik =

Kızılcapınar
- Neighbourhood
- Location in Turkey Kızılcapınar (Turkey Aegean)
- Coordinates: 37.9017°N 27.5297°E
- Country: Turkey
- Province: Aydın
- District: Germencik
- Population (2022): 617
- Time zone: UTC+3 (TRT)

Kızılcapınar is a neighbourhood in the municipality and district of Germencik, Aydın Province, Turkey. Its population is 617 (2022). The village is inhabited by Tahtacı.
