= Güvenir, Bozdoğan =

Güvenir
- Neighbourhood
- Location in Turkey Güvenir (Turkey Aegean)
- Coordinates: 37.5085°N 28.5526°E
- Country: Turkey
- Province: Aydın
- District: Bozdoğan
- Population (2022): 204
- Time zone: UTC+3 (TRT)

Güvenir is a neighbourhood in the municipality and district of Bozdoğan, Aydın Province, Turkey. Its population is 204 (2022).
