= Uzunkum, Germencik =

Uzunkum
- Neighbourhood
- Location in Turkey Uzunkum (Turkey Aegean)
- Coordinates: 37°49′N 27°32′E
- Country: Turkey
- Province: Aydın
- District: Germencik
- Population (2022): 122
- Time zone: UTC+3 (TRT)

Uzunkum is a neighbourhood in the municipality and district of Germencik, Aydın Province, Turkey. Its population is 122 (2022).
