= Üzümlü, Germencik =

Üzümlü
- Neighbourhood
- Location in Turkey Üzümlü (Turkey Aegean)
- Coordinates: 37.8167°N 27.5667°E
- Country: Turkey
- Province: Aydın
- District: Germencik
- Population (2022): 517
- Time zone: UTC+3 (TRT)

Üzümlü is a neighbourhood in the municipality and district of Germencik, Aydın Province, Turkey. Its population is 517 (2022).
