= Örencik, Bozdoğan =

Örencik
- Neighbourhood
- Country: Turkey
- Province: Aydın
- District: Bozdoğan
- Population (2022): 407
- Time zone: UTC+3 (TRT)

Örencik is a neighbourhood in the municipality and district of Bozdoğan, Aydın Province, Turkey. Its population is 407 (2022).
