= Yukarıyakacık, Kuyucak =

Yukarıyakacık
- Neighbourhood
- Location in Turkey Yukarıyakacık (Turkey Aegean)
- Coordinates: 38°5′2″N 28°32′6″E
- Country: Turkey
- Province: Aydın
- District: Kuyucak
- Population (2022): 423
- Time zone: UTC+3 (TRT)

Yukarıyakacık is a neighbourhood in the municipality and district of Kuyucak, Aydın Province, Turkey. Its population is 423 (2022).
