= Sırma, Bozdoğan =

Sırma
- Neighbourhood
- Location in Turkey Sırma (Turkey Aegean)
- Coordinates: 37°36′N 28°28′E
- Country: Turkey
- Province: Aydın
- District: Bozdoğan
- Population (2022): 810
- Time zone: UTC+3 (TRT)

Sırma is a neighbourhood in the municipality and district of Bozdoğan, Aydın Province, Turkey. Its population is 810 (2022).
