= Dereköy, Germencik =

Dereköy
- Neighbourhood
- Location in Turkey Dereköy (Turkey Aegean)
- Coordinates: 37.9000°N 27.5500°E
- Country: Turkey
- Province: Aydın
- District: Germencik
- Population (2022): 136
- Time zone: UTC+3 (TRT)

Dereköy is a neighbourhood in the municipality and district of Germencik, Aydın Province, Turkey. Its population is 136 (2022).
