= Karacaören, Karacasu =

Karacaören
- Neighbourhood
- Location in Turkey Karacaören (Turkey Aegean)
- Coordinates: 37.8245°N 28.6635°E
- Country: Turkey
- Province: Aydın
- District: Karacasu
- Population (2022): 391
- Time zone: UTC+3 (TRT)

Karacaören is a neighbourhood in the municipality and district of Karacasu, Aydın Province, Turkey. Its population is 391 (2022).
