= Kakkalan, Bozdoğan =

Kakkalan
- Neighbourhood
- Location in Turkey Kakkalan (Turkey Aegean)
- Coordinates: 37°39′29″N 28°19′12″E
- Country: Turkey
- Province: Aydın
- District: Bozdoğan
- Population (2022): 390
- Time zone: UTC+3 (TRT)

Kakkalan is a neighbourhood in the municipality and district of Bozdoğan, Aydın Province, Turkey. Its population is 390 (2022).
