= Fatih, Kuyucak =

Village in Turkey

Fatih
- Neighbourhood
- Location in Turkey Fatih (Turkey Aegean)
- Coordinates: 37°54′41″N 28°27′56″E
- Country: Turkey
- Province: Aydın
- District: Kuyucak
- Population (2024): 911
- Time zone: UTC+3 (TRT)

Fatih is a neighbourhood in the municipality and district of Kuyucak, Aydın Province, Turkey. Its population is 911 (2024).
