= Büyükdağlı, Karacasu =

Village in Turkey

Büyükdağlı
- Neighbourhood
- Location in Turkey Büyükdağlı (Turkey Aegean)
- Coordinates: 37°43′21″N 28°36′14″E
- Country: Turkey
- Province: Aydın
- District: Karacasu
- Population (2024): 137
- Time zone: UTC+3 (TRT)

Büyükdağlı is a neighbourhood in the municipality and district of Karacasu, Aydın Province, Turkey. Its population is 137 (2024).
