= Asma, Bozdoğan =

Asma
- Neighbourhood
- Location in Turkey Asma (Turkey Aegean)
- Coordinates: 37°42′28″N 28°27′9″E
- Country: Turkey
- Province: Aydın
- District: Bozdoğan
- Population (2022): 320
- Time zone: UTC+3 (TRT)

Asma (also: Asmaköy) is a neighbourhood in the municipality and district of Bozdoğan, Aydın Province, Turkey. Its population is 320 (2022).
