= Akyaka, Bozdoğan =

Akyaka
- Neighbourhood
- Location in Turkey Akyaka (Turkey Aegean)
- Coordinates: 37.5649°N 28.5608°E
- Country: Turkey
- Province: Aydın
- District: Bozdoğan
- Population (2022): 146
- Time zone: UTC+3 (TRT)

Akyaka is a neighbourhood in the municipality and district of Bozdoğan, Aydın Province, Turkey. Its population is 146 (2022).
