= Kızılca, Bozdoğan =

Kızılca
- Neighbourhood
- Location in Turkey Kızılca (Turkey Aegean)
- Coordinates: 37.6833°N 28.5000°E
- Country: Turkey
- Province: Aydın
- District: Bozdoğan
- Population (2022): 688
- Time zone: UTC+3 (TRT)

Kızılca is a neighbourhood in the municipality and district of Bozdoğan, Aydın Province, Turkey. Its population is 688 (2022).
