= Esençay, Karacasu =

Esençay
- Neighbourhood
- Country: Turkey
- Province: Aydın
- District: Karacasu
- Population (2022): 675
- Time zone: UTC+3 (TRT)

Esençay, also known as Boyasın, is a neighbourhood in the municipality and district of Karacasu, Aydın Province, Turkey. Its population is 675 (2022). The village is inhabited by Tahtacı.
