= Dikmen, Karacasu =

Dikmen
- Neighbourhood
- Location in Turkey Dikmen (Turkey Aegean)
- Coordinates: 37.7167°N 28.8167°E
- Country: Turkey
- Province: Aydın
- District: Karacasu
- Population (2022): 240
- Time zone: UTC+3 (TRT)

Dikmen is a neighbourhood in the municipality and district of Karacasu, Aydın Province, Turkey. Its population is 240 (2022).
