= Osmaniye, Bozdoğan =

Osmaniye
- Neighbourhood
- Location in Turkey Osmaniye (Turkey Aegean)
- Coordinates: 37.7667°N 28.3167°E
- Country: Turkey
- Province: Aydın
- District: Bozdoğan
- Population (2022): 76
- Time zone: UTC+3 (TRT)

Osmaniye is a neighbourhood in the municipality and district of Bozdoğan, Aydın Province, Turkey. Its population is 76 (2022).
