= Seki, Bozdoğan =

Seki
- Neighbourhood
- Coordinates
- Country: Turkey
- Province: Aydın
- District: Bozdoğan
- Population (2022): 447
- Time zone: UTC+3 (TRT)

Seki is a neighbourhood in the municipality and district of Bozdoğan, Aydın Province, Turkey. Its population is 447 (2022).
