= Gencelli, Kuyucak =

Gencelli
- Neighbourhood
- Location in Turkey Gencelli (Turkey Aegean)
- Coordinates: 37.9576°N 28.6602°E
- Country: Turkey
- Province: Aydın
- District: Kuyucak
- Population (2022): 797
- Time zone: UTC+3 (TRT)

Gencelli is a neighbourhood in the municipality and district of Kuyucak, Aydın Province, Turkey. Its population is 797 (2022).
