= Alangüllü, Germencik =

Alangüllü
- Neighbourhood
- Location in Turkey Alangüllü (Turkey Aegean)
- Coordinates: 37°54′N 27°37′E
- Country: Turkey
- Province: Aydın
- District: Germencik
- Population (2022): 165
- Time zone: UTC+3 (TRT)

Alangüllü is a neighbourhood in the municipality and district of Germencik, Aydın Province, Turkey. Its population is 165 (2022).
