= Yenimahalle, Germencik =

Village in Turkey

Yenimahalle
- Neighbourhood
- Location in Turkey Yenimahalle (Turkey Aegean)
- Coordinates: 37°51′58″N 27°36′18″E
- Country: Turkey
- Province: Aydın
- District: Germencik
- Population (2024): 1,704
- Time zone: UTC+3 (TRT)

Yenimahalle is a neighbourhood in the municipality and district of Germencik, Aydın Province, Turkey. Its population is 1,704 (2024).
