= Park, Germencik =

Village in Turkey

Park
- Neighbourhood
- Location in Turkey Park (Turkey Aegean)
- Coordinates: 37°52′13″N 27°35′45″E
- Country: Turkey
- Province: Aydın
- District: Germencik
- Population (2024): 4,671
- Time zone: UTC+3 (TRT)

Park is a neighbourhood in the municipality and district of Germencik, Aydın Province, Turkey. Its population is 4,671 (2024).
