= Karapınar, Kuyucak =

Karapınar
- Neighbourhood
- Location in Turkey Karapınar (Turkey Aegean)
- Coordinates: 37.8667°N 28.5167°E
- Country: Turkey
- Province: Aydın
- District: Kuyucak
- Population (2022): 555
- Time zone: UTC+3 (TRT)

Karapınar is a neighbourhood in the municipality and district of Kuyucak, Aydın Province, Turkey. Its population is 555 (2022).
