= Kazandere, Bozdoğan =

Kazandere
- Neighbourhood
- Location in Turkey Kazandere (Turkey Aegean)
- Coordinates: 37.6167°N 28.3833°E
- Country: Turkey
- Province: Aydın
- District: Bozdoğan
- Population (2022): 418
- Time zone: UTC+3 (TRT)

Kazandere is a neighbourhood in the municipality and district of Bozdoğan, Aydın Province, Turkey. Its population is 418 (2022).
