= Aydınoğlu, Kuyucak =

Village in Turkey

Aydınoğlu
- Neighbourhood
- Location in Turkey Aydınoğlu (Turkey Aegean)
- Coordinates: 37°54′56″N 28°27′47″E
- Country: Turkey
- Province: Aydın
- District: Kuyucak
- Population (2024): 1,057
- Time zone: UTC+3 (TRT)

Aydınoğlu is a neighbourhood in the municipality and district of Kuyucak, Aydın Province, Turkey. Its population is 1,057 (2024).
