= Musakolu, Kuyucak =

Musakolu
- Neighbourhood
- Location in Turkey Musakolu (Turkey Aegean)
- Coordinates: 38°04′N 28°38′E
- Country: Turkey
- Province: Aydın
- District: Kuyucak
- Population (2022): 205
- Time zone: UTC+3 (TRT)

Musakolu is a neighbourhood in the municipality and district of Kuyucak, Aydın Province, Turkey. Its population is 205 (2022).
