= Koyuncu =

Koyuncu is a Turkish name, meaning "sheep farmer." It may refer to:

== People ==
- Kâzım Koyuncu (1972–2005), Turkish singer-songwriter
- Kemal Koyuncu (born 1985), Turkish runner

== Places ==
- Koyuncu, Göynücek, a village in the district of Göynücek, Amasya Province, Turkey
- Koyuncu, Seyhan, a village in the district of Seyhan, Adana Province, Turkey

== See also ==
- Koyuncular (disambiguation)
