= Örentaht, Bozdoğan =

Örentaht
- Neighbourhood
- Location in Turkey Örentaht (Turkey Aegean)
- Coordinates: 37°32′N 28°22′E
- Country: Turkey
- Province: Aydın
- District: Bozdoğan
- Population (2022): 740
- Time zone: UTC+3 (TRT)

Örentaht is a neighbourhood in the municipality and district of Bozdoğan, Aydın Province, Turkey. Its population is 740 (2022).
