= Olukbaşı, Bozdoğan =

Olukbaşı
- Neighbourhood
- Location in Turkey Olukbaşı (Turkey Aegean)
- Coordinates: 37°39′58″N 28°29′13″E
- Country: Turkey
- Province: Aydın
- District: Bozdoğan
- Population (2022): 744
- Time zone: UTC+3 (TRT)

Olukbaşı is a neighbourhood in the municipality and district of Bozdoğan, Aydın Province, Turkey. Its population is 744 (2022).
