= Yaylalı, Karacasu =

Village in Turkey

Yaylalı
- Neighbourhood
- Location in Turkey Yaylalı (Turkey Aegean)
- Coordinates: 37°43′52″N 28°36′40″E
- Country: Turkey
- Province: Aydın
- District: Karacasu
- Population (2024): 3,336
- Time zone: UTC+3 (TRT)

Yaylalı is a neighbourhood in the municipality and district of Karacasu, Aydın Province, Turkey. Its population is 3,336 (2024).
