= Dereköy, Kuyucak =

Dereköy
- Neighbourhood
- Country: Turkey
- Province: Aydın
- District: Kuyucak
- Population (2022): 77
- Time zone: UTC+3 (TRT)

Dereköy is a neighbourhood in the municipality and district of Kuyucak, Aydın Province, Turkey. Its population is 77 (2022).
