= Yolüstü, Karacasu =

Yolüstü
- Neighbourhood
- Country: Turkey
- Province: Aydın
- District: Karacasu
- Population (2022): 199
- Time zone: UTC+3 (TRT)

Yolüstü is a neighbourhood in the municipality and district of Karacasu, Aydın Province, Turkey. Its population is 199 (2022).
