= Başalan, Bozdoğan =

Başalan
- Neighbourhood
- Location in Turkey Başalan (Turkey Aegean)
- Coordinates: 37.5322°N 28.4143°E
- Country: Turkey
- Province: Aydın
- District: Bozdoğan
- Population (2022): 852
- Time zone: UTC+3 (TRT)

Başalan is a neighbourhood in the municipality and district of Bozdoğan, Aydın Province, Turkey. Its population is 852 (2022).
