= Çobanisa, Kuyucak =

Çobanisa
- Neighbourhood
- Location in Turkey Çobanisa (Turkey Aegean)
- Coordinates: 37.9167°N 28.5000°E
- Country: Turkey
- Province: Aydın
- District: Kuyucak
- Population (2022): 955
- Time zone: UTC+3 (TRT)

Çobanisa is a neighbourhood in the municipality and district of Kuyucak, Aydın Province, Turkey. Its population is 955 (2022).
