= Kemer, Bozdoğan =

Kemer
- Neighbourhood
- Location in Turkey Kemer (Turkey Aegean)
- Coordinates: 37.5364°N 28.5486°E
- Country: Turkey
- Province: Aydın
- District: Bozdoğan
- Population (2022): 169
- Time zone: UTC+3 (TRT)

Kemer is a neighbourhood in the municipality and district of Bozdoğan, Aydın Province, Turkey. Its population is 169 (2022).
