= Karacasu =

- District and municipality
- Map showing Karacasu District in Aydın Province

- Location within Turkey Location within Turkey Aegean
- Coordinates: 37°43′51″N 28°36′22″E
- Country: Turkey
- Province: Aydın

Government
  - Mayor: MUSTAFA BÜYÜKYAPICI (CHP)
- Area: 727 km^{2} (281 sq mi)
- Elevation: 570 m (1,870 ft)
- Population (2022): 17,620
  - Density: 24.2/km^{2} (62.8/sq mi)
- Time zone: UTC+3 (TRT)
- Postal code: 09370
- Area code: 0256
- Website: www.karacasuaydin.bel.tr

Karacasu is a municipality and district of Aydın Province, Turkey. Its area is 727 km^{2}, and its population is 17,620 (2022). It is 87 km (54 mi) from the city of Aydın.

Formerly known as "Yenişehir", Karacasu is reached by turning off the Aydın - Denizli road south-east at Kuyucak and following the Dandalaz River upstream into the hills. The road is windy and the surrounding countryside is planted with olives, citrus fruits and as you get higher up, pines.

The ruins of the ancient city of Aphrodisias are located within the boundaries of Karacasu, near the small town of Geyre. The area was first settled in the Bronze Age and reached its peak in the Roman and Byzantine eras as a centre of marble working. The ruins include a stadium, Temple of Aphrodite, theatre, agora and a bath with the heating system still visible. The city also contains the grave of archaeologist Kenan Erim of New York University who did so much to excavate the site.

The district is also notable for its rich emery mines.

Karacasu itself is a small town of nearly 6,000 people, and is thought to be the site of the lost city of Gordiouteichos.

== Composition ==
There are 38 neighbourhoods in Karacasu District:

- Alemler
- Aşağıgörle
- Ataeymir
- Ataköy
- Bahçeköy
- Bereketli
- Bingeç
- Büyükdağlı
- Cabi
- Çamarası
- Çamköy
- Cuma
- Dedeler
- Dereköy
- Dikmen
- Esençay
- Geyre
- Görle
- Güzelbeyli
- Güzelköy
- Hacıhıdırlar
- Işıklar
- Karabağlar
- Karacaören
- Küçükdağlı
- Nargedik
- Palamutçuk
- Tekeliler
- Tepecik
- Yaykın
- Yaylalı
- Yazır
- Yenice
- Yeniköy
- Yeşilköy
- Yeşilyurt
- Yolaltı
- Yolüstü
