= Dutağaç, Bozdoğan =

Dutağaç
- Neighbourhood
- Location in Turkey Dutağaç (Turkey Aegean)
- Coordinates: 37.6737°N 28.5234°E
- Country: Turkey
- Province: Aydın
- District: Bozdoğan
- Population (2022): 376
- Time zone: UTC+3 (TRT)

Dutağaç is a neighbourhood in the municipality and district of Bozdoğan, Aydın Province, Turkey. Its population is 376 (2022).
