= Küçükdağlı, Karacasu =

Village in Turkey

Küçükdağlı
- Neighbourhood
- Location in Turkey Küçükdağlı (Turkey Aegean)
- Coordinates: 37°43′30″N 28°35′51″E
- Country: Turkey
- Province: Aydın
- District: Karacasu
- Population (2024): 734
- Time zone: UTC+3 (TRT)

Küçükdağlı is a neighbourhood in the municipality and district of Karacasu, Aydın Province, Turkey. Its population is 734 (2024).
