= Yakaköy, Bozdoğan =

Yakaköy
- Neighbourhood
- Country: Turkey
- Province: Aydın
- District: Bozdoğan
- Population (2022): 570
- Time zone: UTC+3 (TRT)

Yakaköy (also: Yaka) is a neighbourhood in the municipality and district of Bozdoğan, Aydın Province, Turkey. Its population is 570 (2022).
