= Çamköy, Germencik =

Çamköy
- Neighbourhood
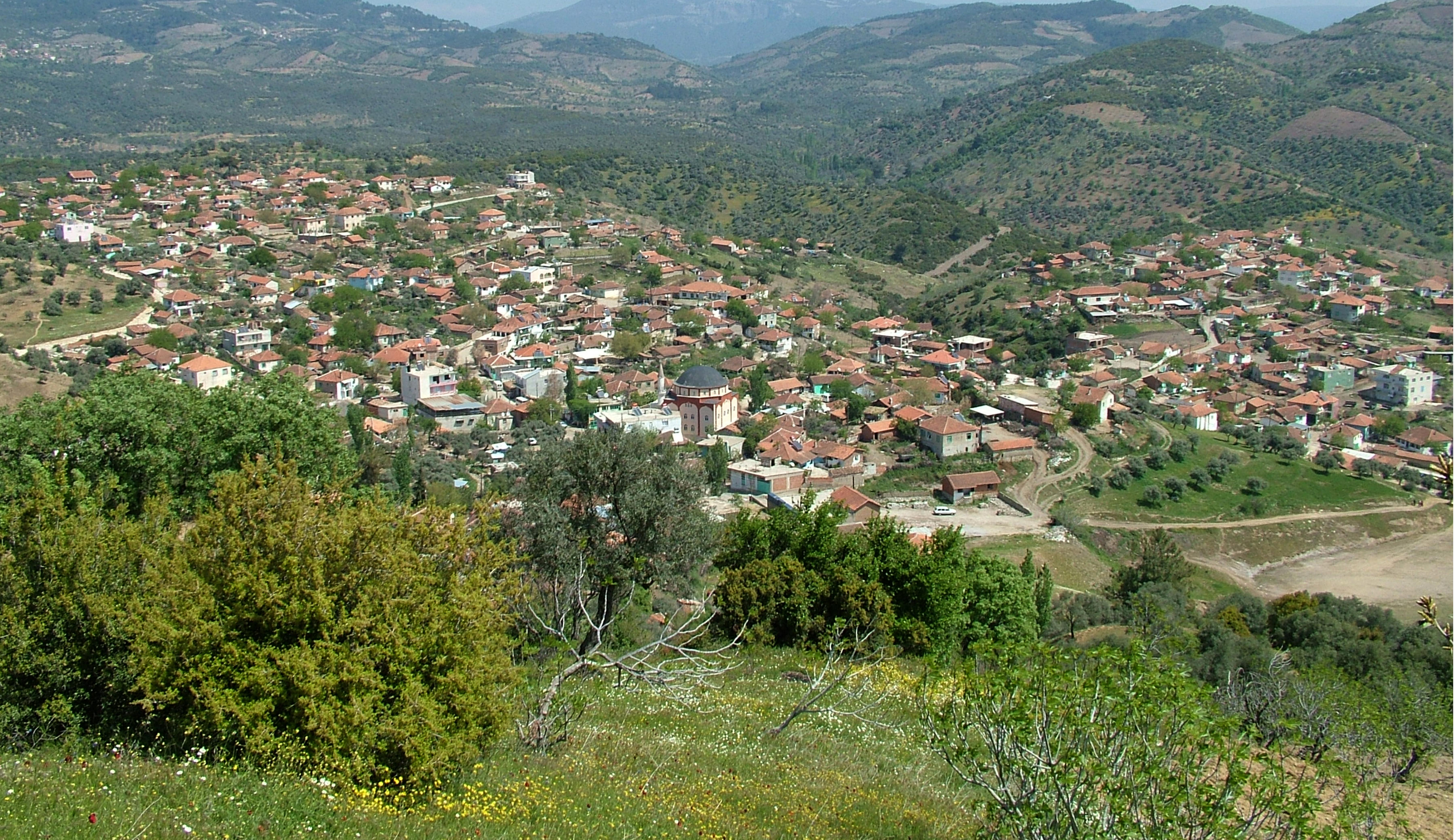

- Location within Turkey Location within Turkey Aegean
- Coordinates: 37.9567°N 27.5900°E
- Country: Turkey
- Province: Aydın
- District: Germencik
- Population (2022): 1,030
- Time zone: UTC+3 (TRT)

Çamköy is a neighbourhood in the municipality and district of Germencik, Aydın Province, Turkey. Its population is 1,030 (2022).
