= Abdurrahmanlar, Serik =

Neighborhood in Turkey

Abdurrahmanlar
- Neighbourhood
- Location within Turkey
- Coordinates: 36.9899806°N 30.9386000°E
- Country: Turkey
- Province: Antalya
- District: Serik
- Population (2025): 1,699
- Time zone: UTC+3 (TRT)
- Postal code: 07500
- Area code: 242

Abdurrahmanlar is a neighbourhood in the municipality and district of Serik, Antalya Province, Turkey. Its population is 1,699 (2025).

== Geography ==
Abdurrahmanlar is located 26 km away from Antalya city center, 20 km from Serik district center.

== Economy ==
Citrus fruits and greenhouse-grown vegetables and fruits are cultivated in Abdurrahmanlar. Both small ruminant and large livestock farming are practised in the area.

== Population ==
Historical population
Year	Pop.	±% p.a.
2013	2,036	—
2014	1,676	−17.68%
2015	1,686	+0.60%
2016	1,595	−5.40%
2017	1,609	+0.88%
2018	1,578	−1.93%
2019	1,617	+2.47%
2020	1,646	+1.79%
2021	1,624	−1.34%
2022	1,695	+4.37%
2023	1,665	−1.77%
2024	1,667	+0.12%
2025	1,699	+1.92%
Source: TÜİK
