= Çarıklar, Köprübaşı =

Çarıklar
- Neighbourhood
- Location in Turkey Çarıklar (Turkey Aegean)
- Coordinates: 38.6608°N 28.3426°E
- Country: Turkey
- Province: Manisa
- District: Köprübaşı
- Population (2022): 108
- Time zone: UTC+3 (TRT)

Çarıklar is a neighbourhood of the municipality and district of Köprübaşı, Manisa Province, Turkey. Its population is 108 (2022). The waterline of the Demirköprü Dam system is nearby.
