= Bucakköy, Kuyucak =

Bucakköy
- Neighbourhood
- Location in Turkey Bucakköy (Turkey Aegean)
- Coordinates: 37.9038°N 28.6970°E
- Country: Turkey
- Province: Aydın
- District: Kuyucak
- Population (2022): 377
- Time zone: UTC+3 (TRT)

Bucakköy is a neighbourhood in the municipality and district of Kuyucak, Aydın Province, Turkey. Its population is 377 (2022).
