= Germencik =

- District and municipality
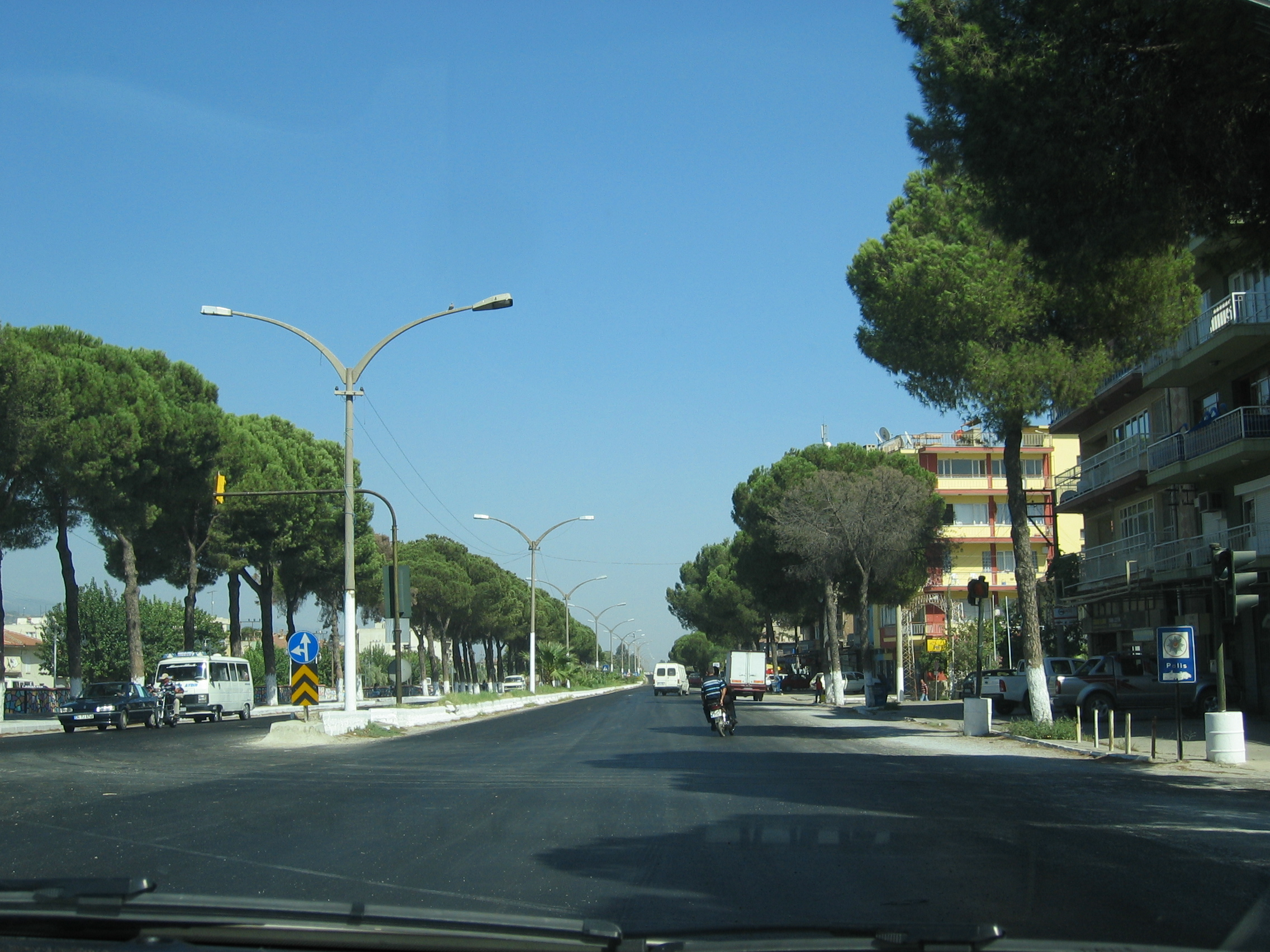

- Map showing Germencik District in Aydın Province

- Location within Turkey Location within Turkey Aegean
- Coordinates: 37°52′11″N 27°36′21″E
- Country: Turkey
- Province: Aydın

Government
  - Mayor: Burak Zencirci (CHP)
- Area: 394 km^{2} (152 sq mi)
- Population (2022): 44,172
  - Density: 112/km^{2} (290/sq mi)
- Time zone: UTC+3 (TRT)
- Postal code: 09700
- Area code: 0256
- Website: www.germencik.bel.tr

Germencik is a municipality and district of Aydın Province, Turkey. Its area is 394 km^{2}, and its population is 44,172 (2022).

== Geography ==
Germencik is located in the middle of the fertile Büyük Menderes (Meander) plain, inland from the Aegean coastal town of Kuşadası, on the Aydın-İzmir highway 25 km (16 mi) from the city of Aydın. It is also the junction of the İzmir-Aydın-Afyonkarahisar and Ortaklar-Söke railway lines.

Until the 1950s, the plain was a swampy area prone to regular flooding and Germencik grew as people moved from the wet lands into the town. Today Germencik itself is a small town of 12,000 people, astride the Izmir-Aydın highway, providing high schools, a hospital, a library and other services for the surrounding district. There are more health centres and primary schools in the villages of the district.

The economy of Germencik depends on agriculture, the main crops are figs and olives but cotton, sesame and other crops are also grown here. Of the 374.39 km^{2} total area of Germencik, 255.8 km^{2} is planted and of the remainder 106.23 km^{2} is forest, 6.65 km^{2} is meadow/pasture, 5.19 km^{2} is unused and 0.52 km^{2} is lake or swamp. In 1998, 16,950 tons of cotton were produced from 56.5 km^{2}, 7,500 tons of figs from 87.22 km^{2} and 44,170 tons of olives from 92.92 km^{2}. Sheep and cattle are raised too and there is a small dairy industry as well as bee-keeping and some poultry farming.

Industry in the area is mainly the processing of the local produce to make tahini, halva, olive oil, etc.

The people live the traditional Turkish rural lifestyle with strong family ties, etc. The women generally cover their heads and wear long skirts.

== Composition ==
There are 36 neighbourhoods in Germencik District:

- Abdurrahmanlar
- Alangüllü
- Balatçık
- Bozköy
- Camikebir
- Çamköy
- Çarıklar
- Dağkaraağaç
- Dağyeni
- Dampınar
- Dereköy
- Gümüşköy
- Gümüşyeniköy
- Habibler
- Hıdırbeyli
- İstasyon
- Karaağaçlı
- Kızılcagedik
- Kızılcapınar
- Meşeli
- Mesudiye
- Moralı
- Mursallı
- Naipli
- Neşetiye
- Ömerbeyli
- Ortaklar
- Park
- Reisköy
- Selatin
- Tekin
- Turanlar
- Üzümlü
- Uzunkum
- Yedieylül
- Yenimahalle

== Places of interest ==
The remains of the antique city of Magnesia on the Maeander are located on the west side of Route D525 between Ortaklar and Söke, just west of the village of Tekin.

The hot springs in the villages of Alangüllü, Çamur, and Gümüşlü, all 10–12 km north of Germencik.

== See also ==
- 75th Anniversary Selatin Tunnel, Turkey's second longest road tunnel on the motorway O.31.
