= Pamukören, Kuyucak =

Pamukören
- Neighbourhood
- Location in Turkey Pamukören (Turkey Aegean)
- Coordinates: 37°55′N 28°32′E
- Country: Turkey
- Province: Aydın
- District: Kuyucak
- Population (2022): 2,603
- Time zone: UTC+3 (TRT)

Pamukören is a neighbourhood of the municipality and district of Kuyucak, Aydın Province, Turkey. Its population is 2,603 (2022). Before the 2013 reorganisation, it was a town (belde).
