= Yenice, Karacasu =

Yenice
- Neighbourhood
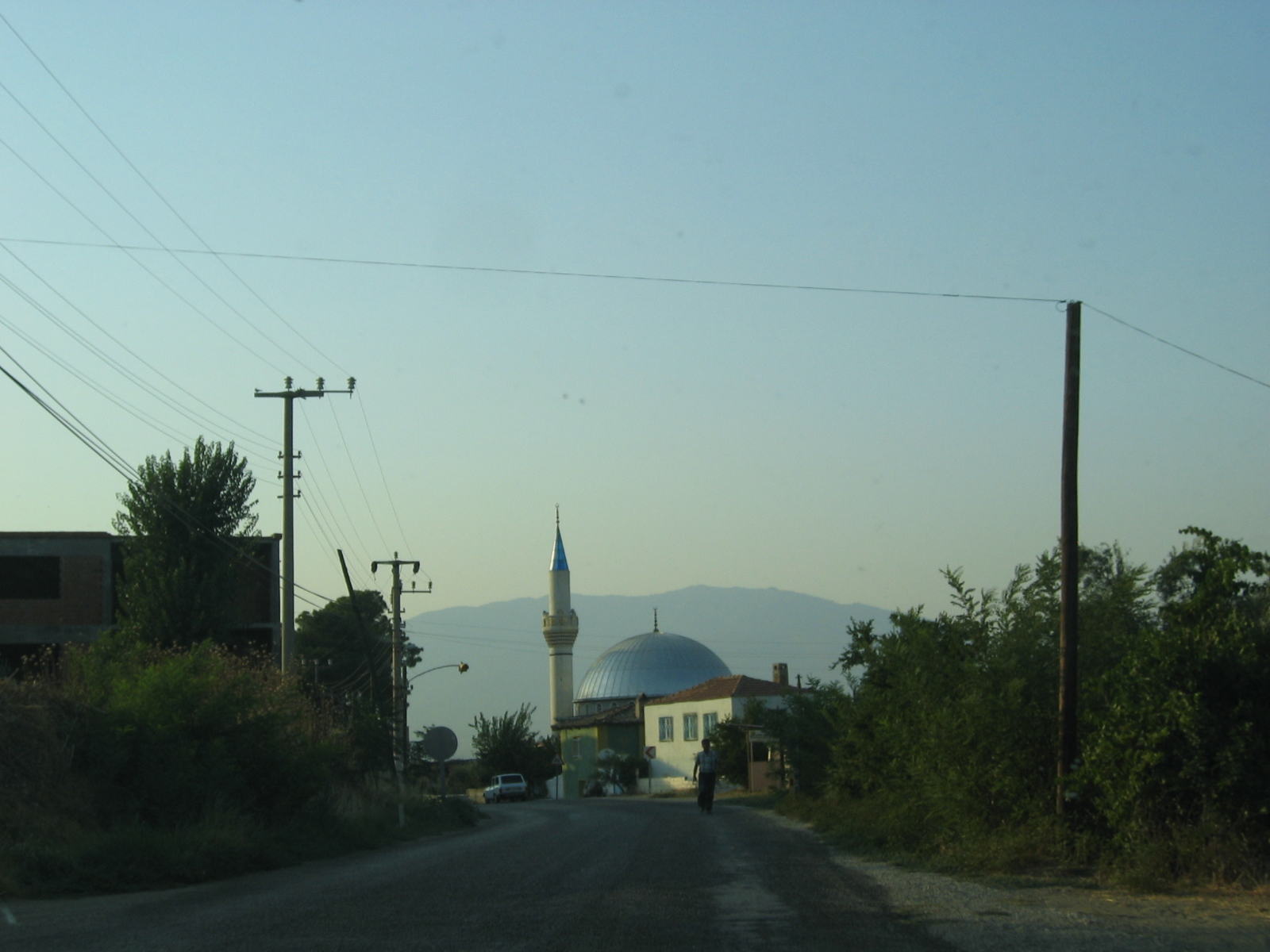

- Location within Turkey Location within Turkey Aegean
- Coordinates: 37.8284°N 28.5712°E
- Country: Turkey
- Province: Aydın
- District: Karacasu
- Population (2022): 916
- Time zone: UTC+3 (TRT)

Yenice is a neighbourhood of the municipality and district of Karacasu, Aydın Province, Turkey. Its population is 916 (2022). Before the 2013 reorganisation, it was a town (belde).
