= Kavaklı, Bozdoğan =

Kavaklı
- Neighbourhood
- Location in Turkey Kavaklı (Turkey Aegean)
- Coordinates: 37.7533°N 28.3006°E
- Country: Turkey
- Province: Aydın
- District: Bozdoğan
- Population (2022): 443
- Time zone: UTC+3 (TRT)

Kavaklı is a neighbourhood in the municipality and district of Bozdoğan, Aydın Province, Turkey. Its population is 443 (2022).
