= Kurtuluş (Horsunlu) =

- Neighbourhood
- Location in Turkey Kurtuluş (Turkey Aegean)
- Coordinates: 37.9432°N 28.6168°E
- Country: Turkey
- Province: Aydın
- District: Kuyucak
- Population (2022): 1,353
- Time zone: UTC+3 (TRT)

Kurtuluş is a neighbourhood of the municipality and district of Kuyucak, Aydın Province, Turkey. Its population is 1,353 (2022). Before the 2013 reorganisation, it was a town (belde).
