= Haydere, Bozdoğan =

Haydere
- Neighbourhood
- Location in Turkey Haydere (Turkey Aegean)
- Coordinates: 37°37′N 28°24′E
- Country: Turkey
- Province: Aydın
- District: Bozdoğan
- Population (2022): 1,471
- Time zone: UTC+3 (TRT)

Haydere is a neighbourhood in the municipality and district of Bozdoğan, Aydın Province, Turkey. Its population is 1,471 (2022).
