= Hıdırbeyli, Germencik =

Hıdırbeyli
- Neighbourhood
- Location in Turkey Hıdırbeyli (Turkey Aegean)
- Coordinates: 37.8833°N 27.6000°E
- Country: Turkey
- Province: Aydın
- District: Germencik
- Population (2022): 1,723
- Time zone: UTC+3 (TRT)

Hıdırbeyli is a neighbourhood of the municipality and district of Germencik, Aydın Province, Turkey. Its population is 1,723 (2022). Before the 2013 reorganisation, it was a town (belde).
