= Çarıklar, Germencik =

Çarıklar
- Neighbourhood
- Location in Turkey Çarıklar (Turkey Aegean)
- Coordinates: 37.9392°N 27.6814°E
- Country: Turkey
- Province: Aydın
- District: Germencik
- Population (2022): 421
- Time zone: UTC+3 (TRT)

Çarıklar is a neighbourhood in the municipality and district of Germencik, Aydın Province, Turkey. Its population was 421 in 2022.
