= Orsinus =

River of ancient Caria

The Orsinus, also called Mossynus, Mosynus, and Morsynos, was a river of ancient Caria, a tributary of the Maeander River, flowing in a northwestern direction, and discharging itself into the main river a few miles (km) below Antioch on the Maeander.

It is identified with the modern Dandala River.
