= Ortaklar =

- Neighbourhood
- Location in Turkey Ortaklar (Turkey Aegean)
- Coordinates: 37°53′N 27°30′E
- Country: Turkey
- Province: Aydın
- District: Germencik
- Elevation: 72 m (236 ft)
- Population (2022): 13,242
- Time zone: UTC+3 (TRT)
- Postal code: 09330
- Area code: 0256

Ortaklar is a neighbourhood of the municipality and district of Germencik, Aydın Province, Turkey. Its population is 13,242 (2022). Before the 2013 reorganisation, it was a town (belde). It is 10 kilometres (6.2 mi) to Germencik and 28 kilometres (17 mi) to Aydın. The ruins of ancient Magnesia on the Maeander are 4 km south of Ortaklar.

It is a typical Aegean Region town. Figs and grapes are its most important products, although it is also known for its çöp kebap restaurants too.

== History ==
The village was founded after 1886 when the railroad from İzmir to Aydın was constructed. After the Balkan Wars, Turkish refugees from Greece were settled in the village and, it being on the route of the railway and close to the D.320 state highway, the village quickly flourished. In 1949 it was declared a town.
