= Ataeymir, Karacasu =

Ataeymir
- Neighbourhood
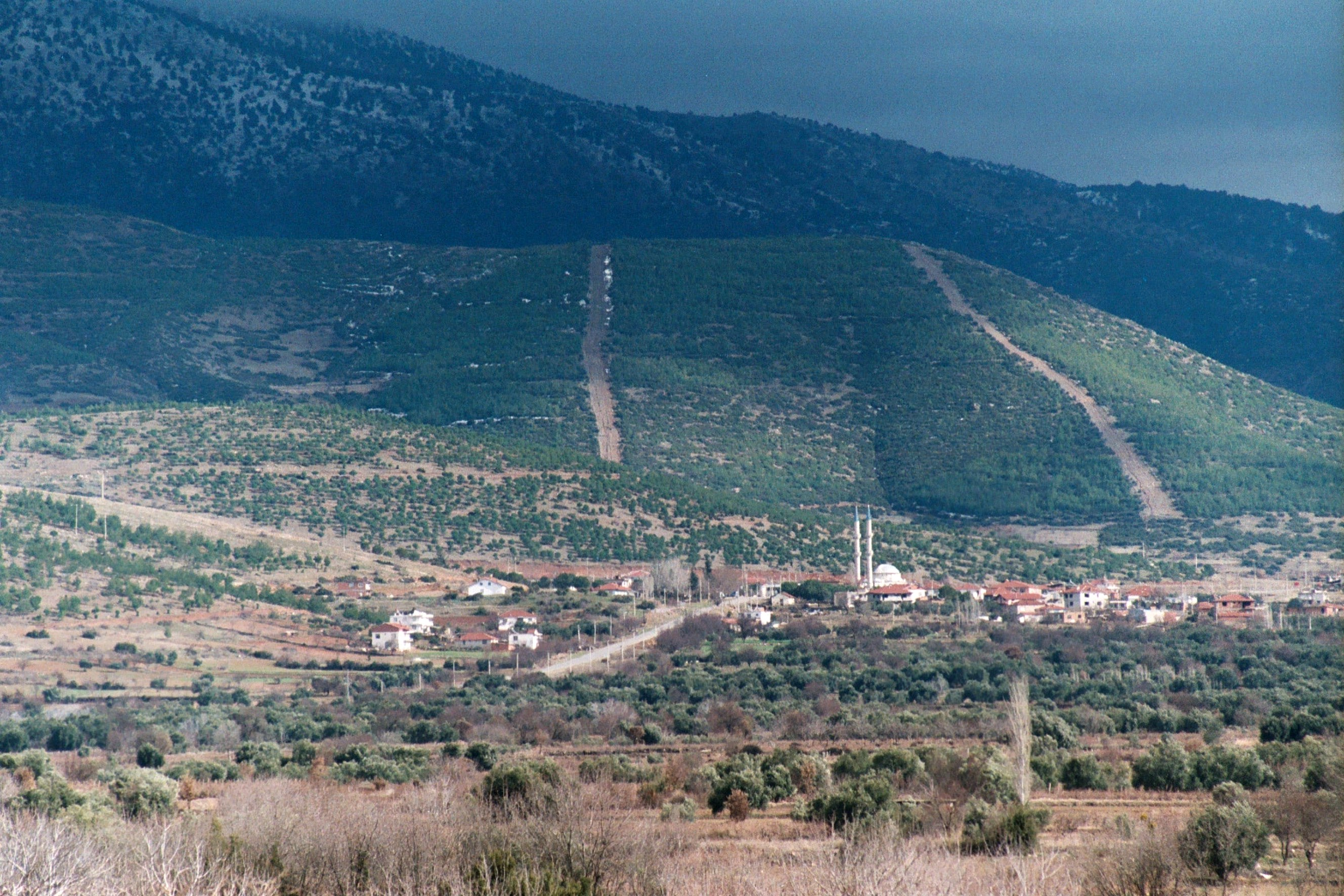

- Location within Turkey Location within Turkey Aegean
- Coordinates: 37°42′N 28°46′E
- Country: Turkey
- Province: Aydın
- District: Karacasu
- Population (2022): 1,099
- Time zone: UTC+3 (TRT)

Ataeymir is a neighbourhood of the municipality and district of Karacasu, Aydın Province, Turkey. Its population is 1,099 (2022). Before the 2013 reorganisation, it was a town (belde).
