= Mursallı, Germencik =

Mursallı
- Neighbourhood
- Location in Turkey Mursallı (Turkey Aegean)
- Coordinates: 37°51′N 27°34′E
- Country: Turkey
- Province: Aydın
- District: Germencik
- Elevation: 72 m (236 ft)
- Population (2022): 959
- Time zone: UTC+3 (TRT)
- Postal code: 09720
- Area code: 0256

Mursallı is a neighbourhood of the municipality and district of Germencik, Aydın Province, Turkey. Its population is 959 (2022). Before the 2013 reorganisation, it was a town (belde). It is situated to the south of Motorway O-31 which connects Aydın to İzmir. It is 6 kilometres (3.7 mi) to Germencik and 30 kilometres (19 mi) to Aydın.

According to town page, the name of the town refers to two brothers named Musa and Ali who founded the settlement during the Ottoman Empire era. Later Greeks also settled in the village. After the Population exchange agreement between Turkey and Greece, the Greeks left the village for Euboea island in the Aegean Sea and they named their new village as Neo Mursallı. (Recently the village in Euboea was renamed as Taxiarches referring to the name of the church in Mursallı.) According to the agreement Turkish families from Grevena in Greece were settled in Mursallı. There are also some Turkish families from Albania in Mursallı. In 1957, Mursallı was declared a seat of township.
