= Bozdoğan =

- District and municipality
- Map showing Bozdoğan District in Aydın Province

- Location in Turkey Bozdoğan (Turkey Aegean)
- Coordinates: 37°40′22″N 28°18′37″E
- Country: Turkey
- Province: Aydın

Government
  - Mayor: Mustafa Galip Özel (CHP)
- Area: 859 km^{2} (332 sq mi)
- Population (2024): 31,945
  - Density: 37.2/km^{2} (96.3/sq mi)
- Time zone: UTC+3 (TRT)
- Postal code: 09760
- Area code: 0256
- Website: www.bozdogan.bel.tr

Bozdoğan is a municipality and district of Aydın Province, Turkey. Its area is 859 km^{2}, and its population is 31,945 (2024). It is 76 km (47 mi) from the city of Aydın.

Bozdoğan is high on the side of Mount Madran, the source of the highly valued Pınar Madran mineral water, which is bottled and packaged at the source. The surroundings are also green and mildly forested. The local economy depends on organic agriculture, especially olives, figs, fruits and vegetables which are exported to the markets of Europe and America.

Bozdoğan itself is a small, quiet town of historic narrow cobble stone streets, and stone houses.

== History ==
From 1867 until 1922, Bozdoğan was part of the Aidin Vilayet of the Ottoman Empire.

== Composition ==
There are 55 neighbourhoods in Bozdoğan District:

- Akçay
- Akseki
- Akyaka
- Alamut
- Alhisar
- Altıntaş
- Amasya
- Asma
- Başalan
- Çamlıdere
- Çarşı
- Cumhuriyet
- Dömen
- Dutağaç
- Eymir
- Güneyköy
- Güneyyaka
- Güre
- Güvenir
- Haydere
- Hıdırbaba
- Hisar
- Hışımlar
- Kakkalan
- Kamışlar
- Karaahmetler
- Karabağlar
- Kavaklı
- Kazandere
- Kemer
- Kılavuzlar
- Kızılca
- Kızıltepe
- Konaklı
- Körteke
- Koyuncular
- Madran
- Olukbaşı
- Örencik
- Örentaht
- Örmepınar
- Örtülü
- Osmaniye
- Pınarlı
- Seki
- Sırma
- Tütüncüler
- Yakaköy
- Yazıkent
- Yeni
- Yenice
- Yeniköy
- Yeşil Yenice
- Yeşilçam
- Ziyaretli

== Education ==
There are 1 kindergartens, 28 primary schools, 11 secondary schools, 3 high schools, 1 public education center, 1 teacher's house and art school and 1 special education practice school affiliated with the Ministry of National Education in the district.
