= Horsunlu, Kuyucak =

Horsunlu
- Neighbourhood
- Location in Turkey Horsunlu (Turkey Aegean)
- Coordinates: 37.9144°N 28.5915°E
- Country: Turkey
- Province: Aydın
- District: Kuyucak
- Population (2022): 2,177
- Time zone: UTC+3 (TRT)

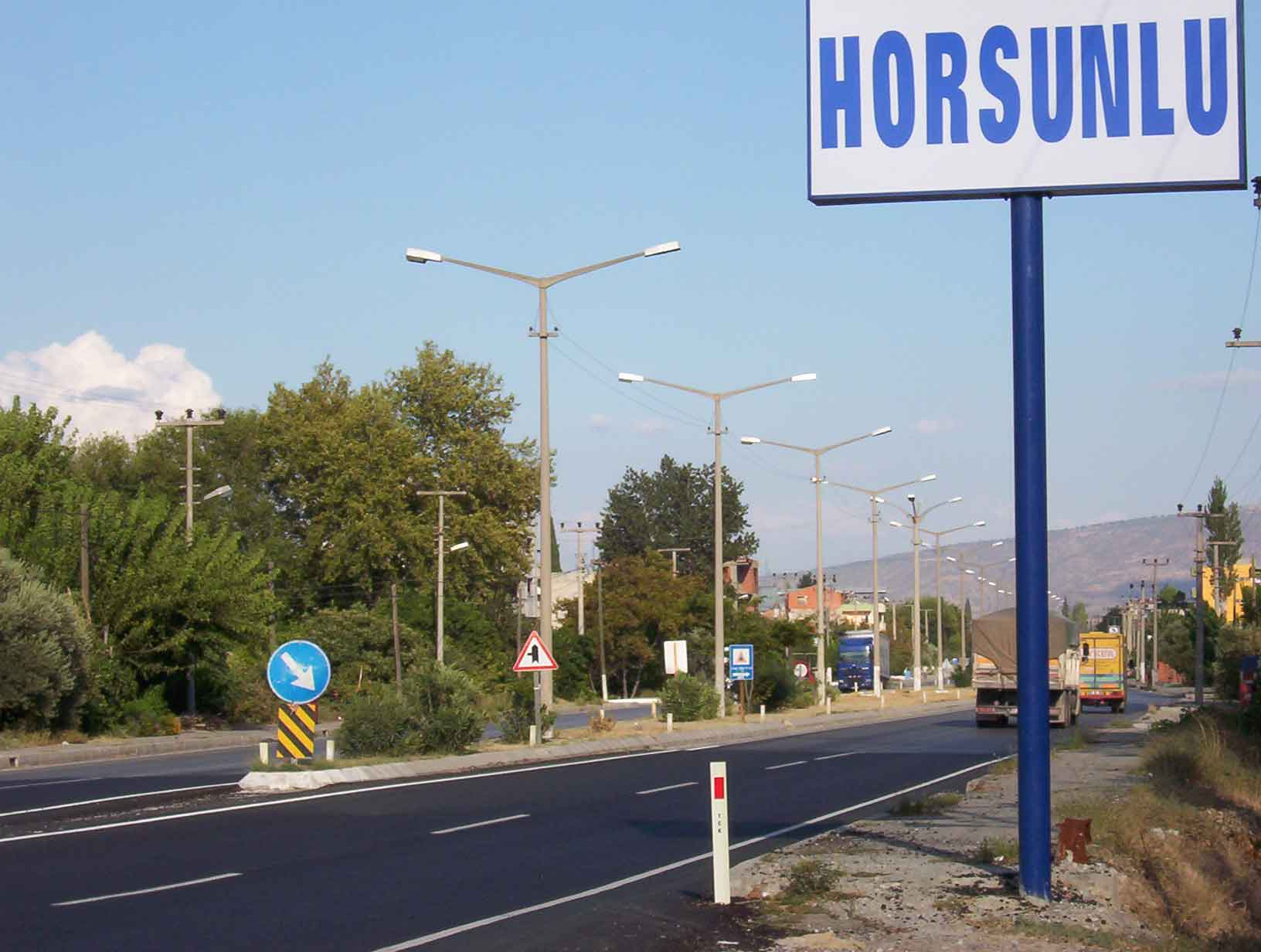

Horsunlu is a neighbourhood of the municipality and district of Kuyucak, Aydın Province, Turkey. Its population is 2,177 (2022). Before the 2013 reorganisation, it was a town (belde).
