= Bozköy, Germencik =

Bozköy
- Neighbourhood
- Location in Turkey Bozköy (Turkey Aegean)
- Coordinates: 37°56′30″N 27°37′55″E
- Country: Turkey
- Province: Aydın
- District: Germencik
- Population (2022): 1,086
- Time zone: UTC+3 (TRT)

Bozköy is a neighbourhood in the municipality and district of Germencik, Aydın Province, Turkey. Its population is 1,086 (2022).
