= Abdurrahmanlar, Germencik =

Abdurrahmanlar
- Neighbourhood
- Location within Turkey Location within Turkey Aegean
- Coordinates: 37°54′22″N 27°33′03″E
- Country: Turkey
- Province: Aydın
- District: Germencik
- Population (2022): 142
- Time zone: UTC+3 (TRT)

Abdurrahmanlar is a neighbourhood in the municipality and district of Germencik, Aydın Province, Turkey. Its population is 142 (2022).
