= Yamalak, Kuyucak =

Yamalak
- Neighbourhood
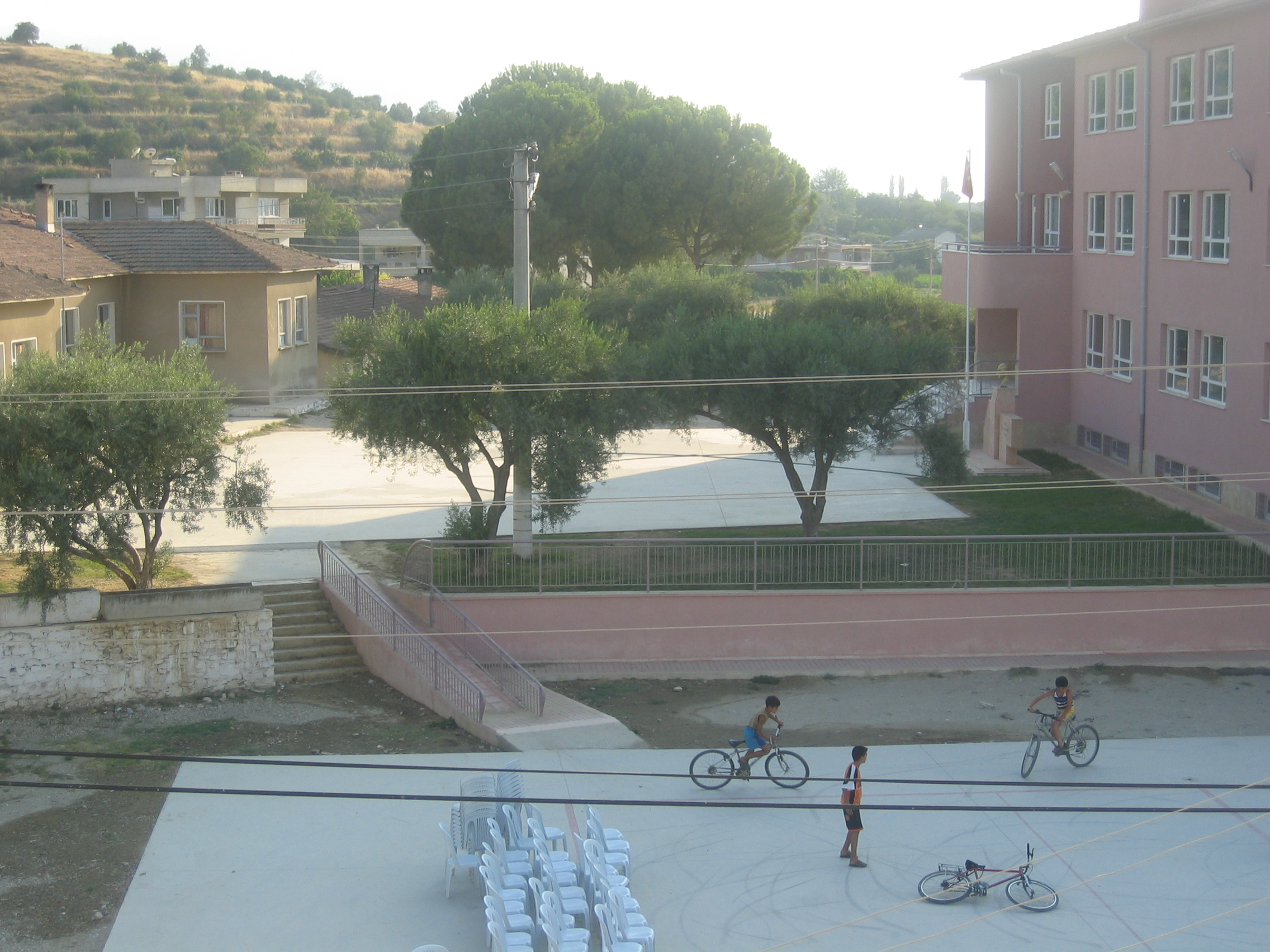

- Location within Turkey Location within Turkey Aegean
- Coordinates: 37°53′52″N 28°37′51″E
- Country: Turkey
- Province: Aydın
- District: Kuyucak
- Population (2022): 1,579
- Time zone: UTC+3 (TRT)

Yamalak is a neighbourhood of the municipality and district of Kuyucak, Aydın Province, Turkey. Its population is 1,579 (2022). Before the 2013 reorganisation, it was a town (belde). The Battle of Antioch on the Meander took place close to the town.
