= Alamut, Bozdoğan =

Alamut
- Neighbourhood
- Location in Turkey Alamut (Turkey Aegean)
- Coordinates: 37°48′27″N 28°17′37″E
- Country: Turkey
- Province: Aydın
- District: Bozdoğan
- Population (2022): 1,042
- Time zone: UTC+3 (TRT)

Alamut is a neighbourhood in the municipality and district of Bozdoğan, Aydın Province, Turkey. Its population is 1,042 (2022). The village is inhabited by Tahtacı.
