= Yazıkent, Bozdoğan =

Yazıkent
- Neighbourhood
- Location in Turkey Yazıkent (Turkey Aegean)
- Coordinates: 37°41′35″N 28°23′13″E
- Country: Turkey
- Province: Aydın
- District: Bozdoğan
- Population (2022): 1,802
- Time zone: UTC+3 (TRT)

Yazıkent is a neighbourhood of the municipality and district of Bozdoğan, Aydın Province, Turkey. Its population is 1,802 (2022). Before the 2013 reorganisation, it was a town (belde).
