= Başaran, Kuyucak =

Başaran
- Neighbourhood
- Location in Turkey Başaran (Turkey Aegean)
- Coordinates: 37.8620°N 28.5398°E
- Country: Turkey
- Province: Aydın
- District: Kuyucak
- Population (2022): 1,161
- Time zone: UTC+3 (TRT)

Başaran is a neighbourhood of the municipality and district of Kuyucak, Aydın Province, Turkey. Its population is 1,161 (2022). Before the 2013 reorganisation, it was a town (belde).
