= Kuyucak =

- District and municipality
- Map showing Kuyucak District in Aydın Province

- Location in Turkey Kuyucak (Turkey Aegean)
- Coordinates: 37°54′55″N 28°27′33″E
- Country: Turkey
- Province: Aydın

Government
  - Mayor: Mehmet Çömden (AKP)
- Area: 544 km^{2} (210 sq mi)
- Population (2022): 26,111
  - Density: 48.0/km^{2} (124/sq mi)
- Time zone: UTC+3 (TRT)
- Postal code: 09930
- Area code: 0256
- Website: www.kuyucak.bel.tr

Kuyucak is a municipality and district of Aydın Province, Turkey. Its area is 544 km^{2}, and its population is 26,111 (2022). It is 58 km (36 mi) from the city of Aydın on the E24 highway that connects İzmir and Denizli, 180 km (112 mi) east of İzmir. Kuyucak is near the larger town of Nazilli.

== Etymology ==
The word of Kuyucak probably comes from kuyuçok (means "many wells").

== Geography ==
In the foothills of the Aydın mountains, the economy of Kuyucak is based on agriculture. The mountain districts produce olive oil, while the lowland plain of the Büyük Menderes River produces high quality oranges, figs and cotton. Kuyucak itself is a small town of 7,200 people.

Kuyucak has a typical Aegean climate, with hot summers, rainy autumns, chilly winters and sunny springs.

=== Composition ===
There are 36 neighbourhoods in Kuyucak District:

- Aksaz
- Aydınoğlu
- Azizabat
- Başaran
- Belenova
- Beşeylül
- Bucakköy
- Çamdibi
- Çobanisa
- Cumhuriyet
- Dereköy
- Fatih
- Gencelli
- Gencellidere
- Horsunlu
- İğdecik
- Karapınar
- Kayran
- Kurtuluş
- Kurtuluş (Horsunlu)
- Merkez Beşeylül
- Musakolu
- Mustafapaşa
- Ören
- Ovacık
- Pamucak
- Pamukören
- Sarıcaova
- Taşoluk
- Yakuppaşa
- Yamalak
- Yaylalı
- Yeni
- Yeşildere
- Yöre
- Yukarıyakacık

=== Transportation ===
There are regular buses from İzmir Adnan Menderes Airport, Nazilli and Denizli (70 km to the west). The town is also on the İzmir–Denizli railway line and there is a daily train service.

== History ==
A few km southeast of Kuyucak lie the ruins of Antioch on the Maeander, an ancient Byzantine city. Independence day is celebrated on 5 September, the date that Kuyucak was liberated at the end of the Turkish War of Independence.

== Kuyucak in popular culture ==
- "Kuyucaklı Yusuf" (Yusuf of Kuyucak) is the title of a major novel published in 1937 by Sabahattin Ali about the small-town life in Turkey. The story was made into a film in 1985 by Feyzi Tuna.
