= Güvercinada Castle =

Castle on Güvercinada, Kuşadası, Turkey

- Güvercinada Kalesi
- Part of Güvercinada
- Kuşadası, Aydın Province in the Republic of Türkiye
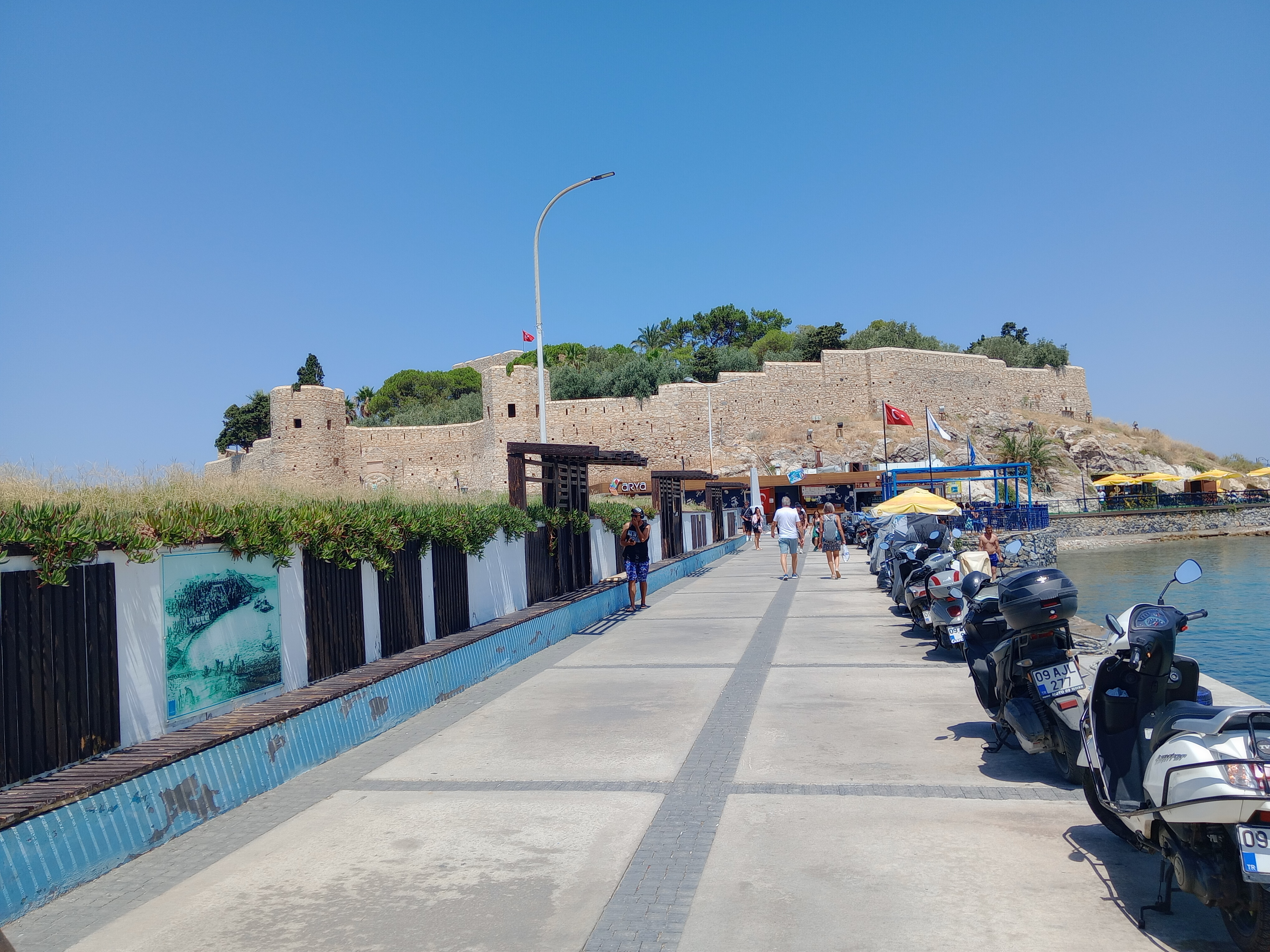
- Güvercinada viewed from the causeway

Site information
- Type: Castle
- Website: kusadasi.bel.tr/tr/guvercinada-pv26

Location
- Güvercinada Kalesi in Turkey
- Coordinates: 37.8636°N 27.2476°E
- Height: 200 metres (660 ft)
- Length: 350 metres (1,150 ft)

Site history
- Built: Late 13th or early 14th century
- Built by: Traders from the Republic of Genoa

Garrison information
- Designations: Tentative World Heritage Site

Güvercinada Castle (Turkish: Güvercinada Kalesi; lit. 'Pigeon Island Castle'), also known as Scalanova Castle, is a castle and fortress in western Turkey on Güvercinada (lit. 'Pigeon Island'), which is connected to mainland Kuşadası via a man-made causeway. It is part of Kuşadası's Hacıfeyzullah neighborhood, and is surrounded by the Gulf of Kuşadası. It is also a tourist attraction. It consists of a square inner castle on Güvercinada's highest point and an outer wall surrounding the island that acts as fortification.

== History ==
Traders from the Republic of Genoa first settled in modern-day Kuşadası in the late 13th or early 14th century. The city of Scalanova (lit. 'New Pier')—now called Kuşadası—and the Güvercinada Castle were established by them. It is named after pigeons because the castle is frequently populated with them.

In the 1530s, Hayreddin Barbarossa, the admiral of the Ottoman Empire's navy, constructed a fortress on the island to protect the castle from naval attacks. The governor of the Sanjak of Suğla, İlyas Ağa, built walls around the island in the 1820s. The castle was originally on a separate island, until a 50 meter causeway was built in the 1950s connecting the two.

It was submitted to UNESCO by the Permanent Delegate of Türkiye to UNESCO on 14 April 2020 and again on 22 June 2026, and is currently on the Tentative List of World Heritage Sites. A 2024 study by Dumlupınar University geoscientist Enes Zengin found that three metres of sea level rise would endanger the castle.

The inner castle is square shaped, measuring 17.35 by 15.70 metres. The outer fortifications are reinforced and match the island's topography. It has an arched entrance with two towers on each side, and two other towers on the north and southeast of the walls. The entrance also has a gap in it, implying that there may have been an inscription there. It was constructed out of stone from Yılancı Burnu. Turkey's Ministry of National Education consider the castle a symbol of Kuşadası.

== Gallery ==
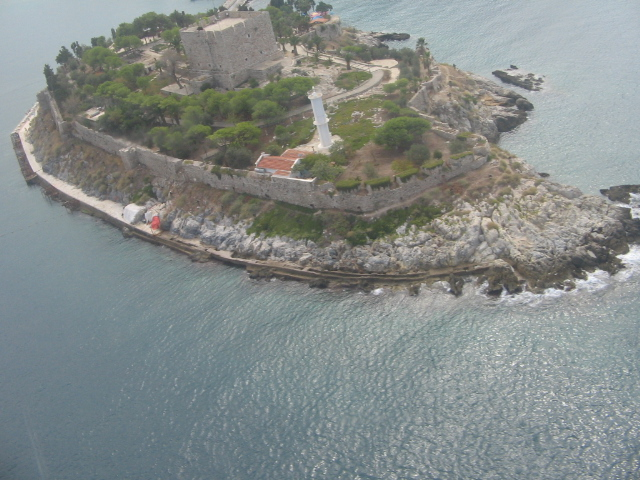
Güvercinada Castle viewed from above

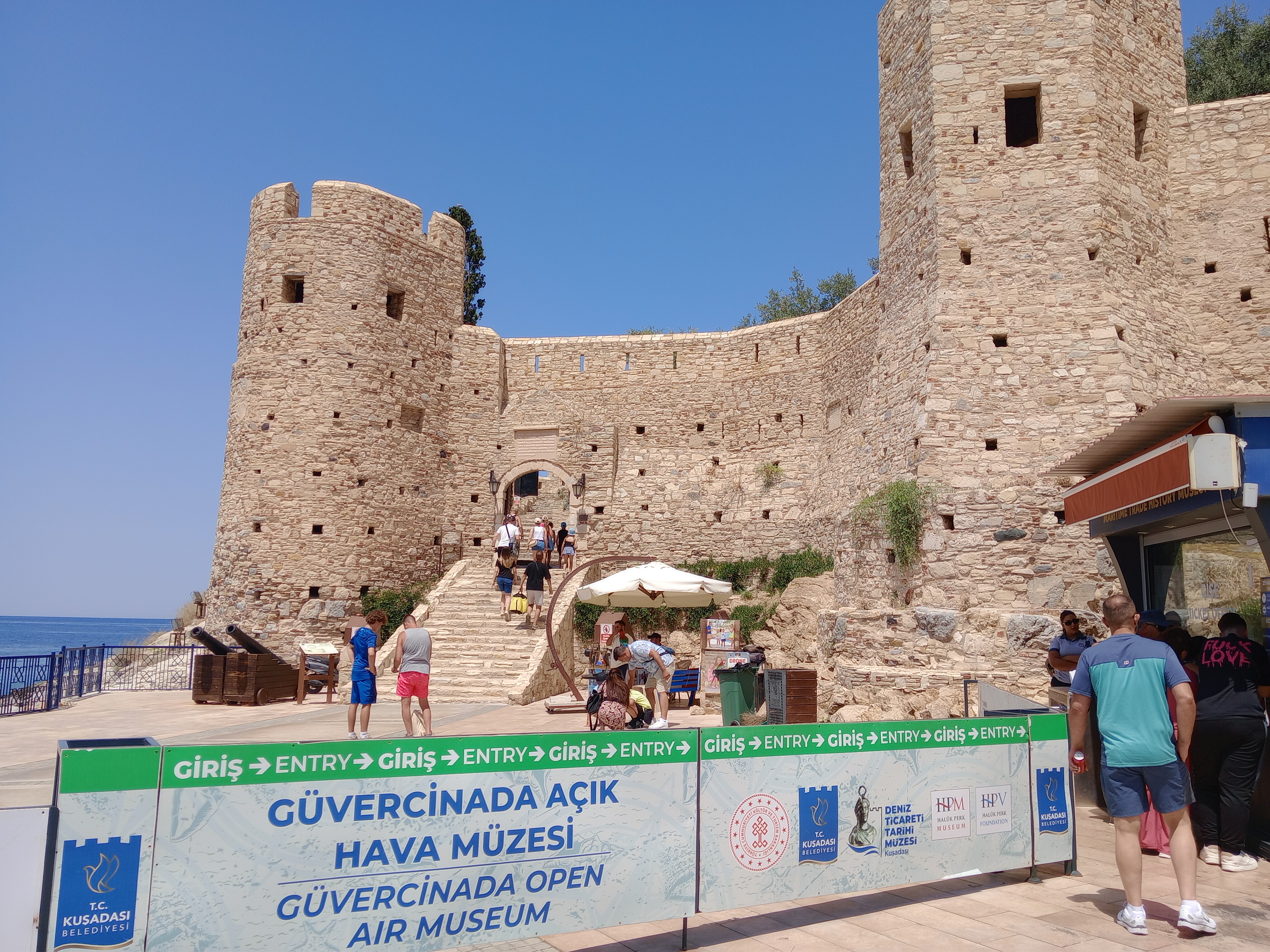
Entrance to Güvercinada Castle

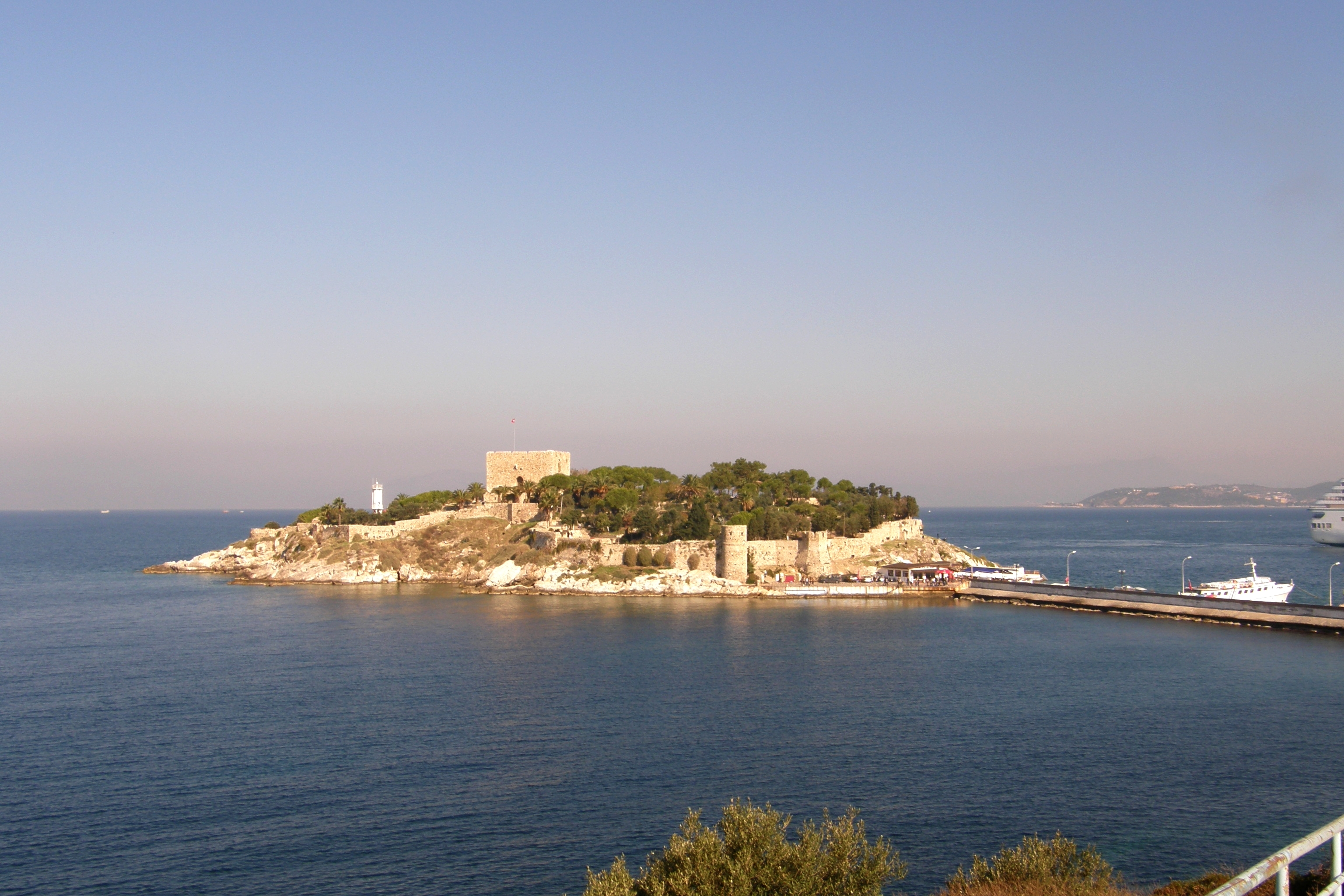
View of Güvercinada Castle from afar

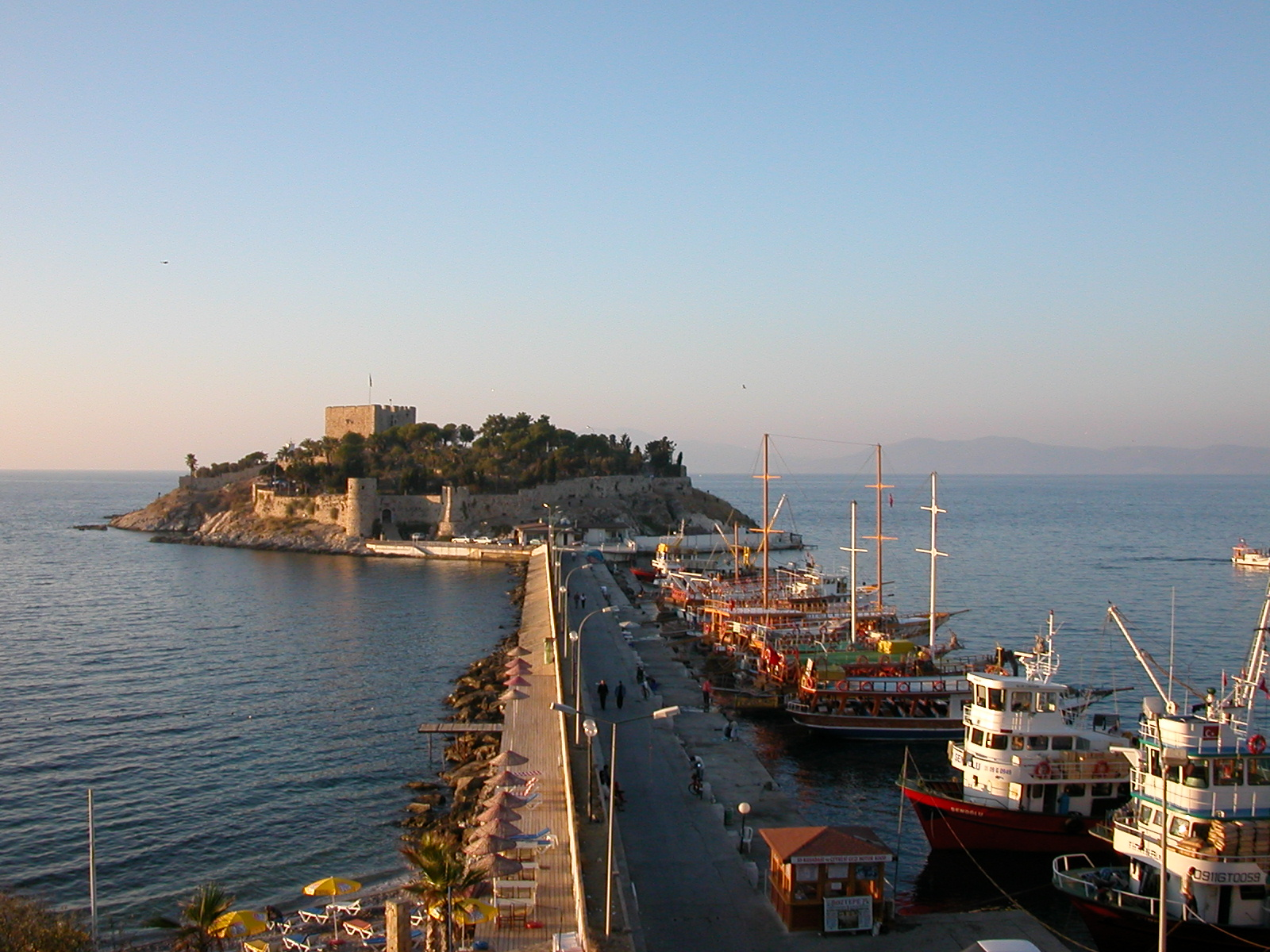
The Güvercinada Castle causeway

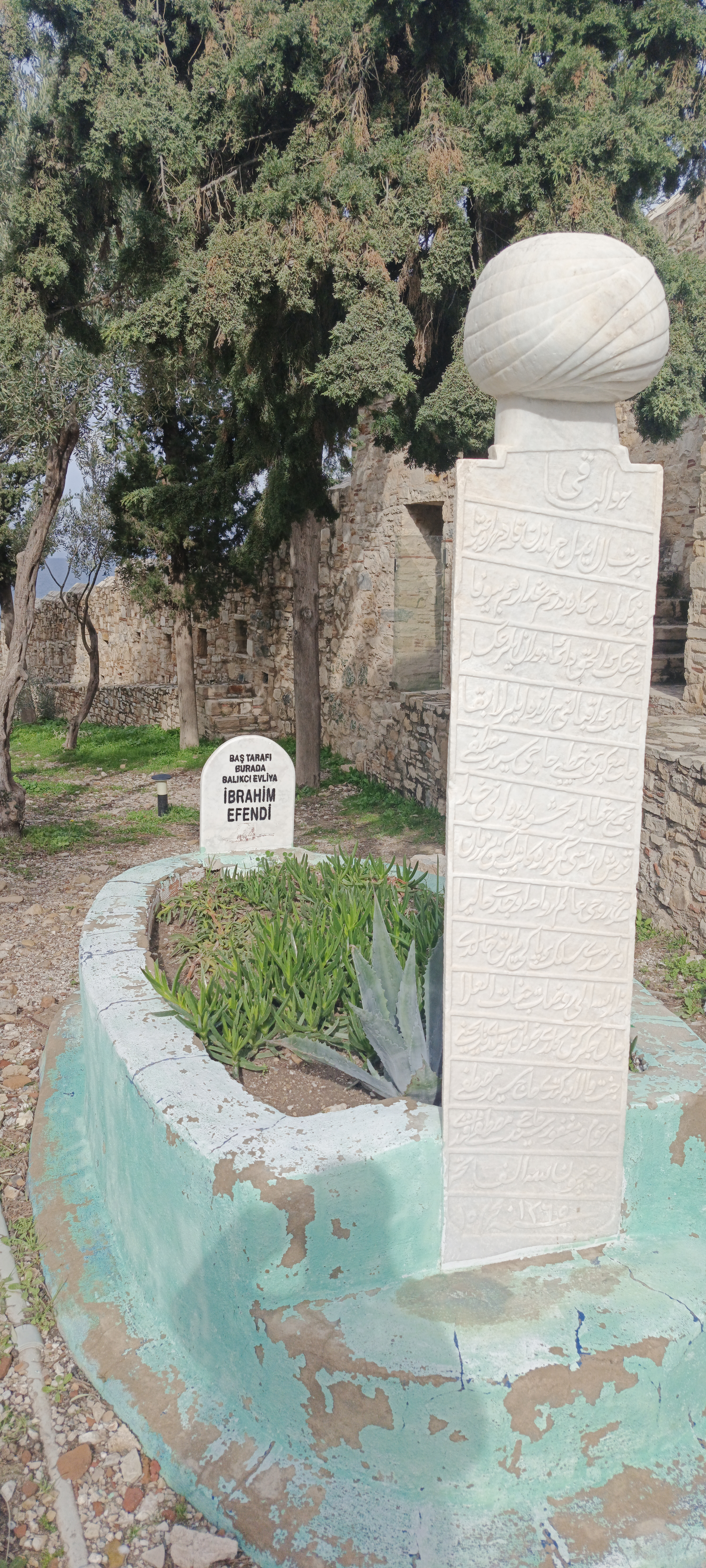
Grave of İbrahim Halveti

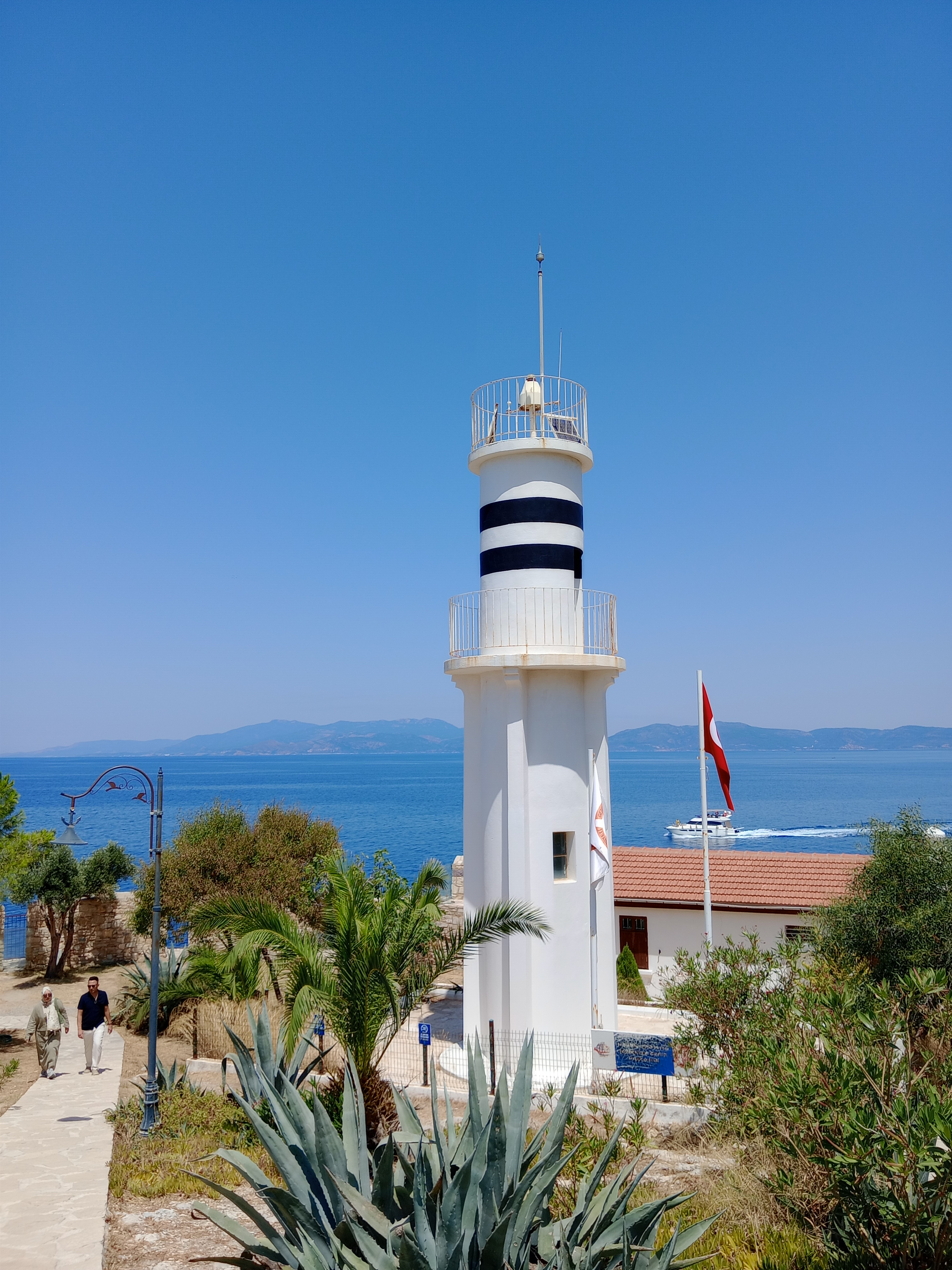
Kusadasi lighthouse

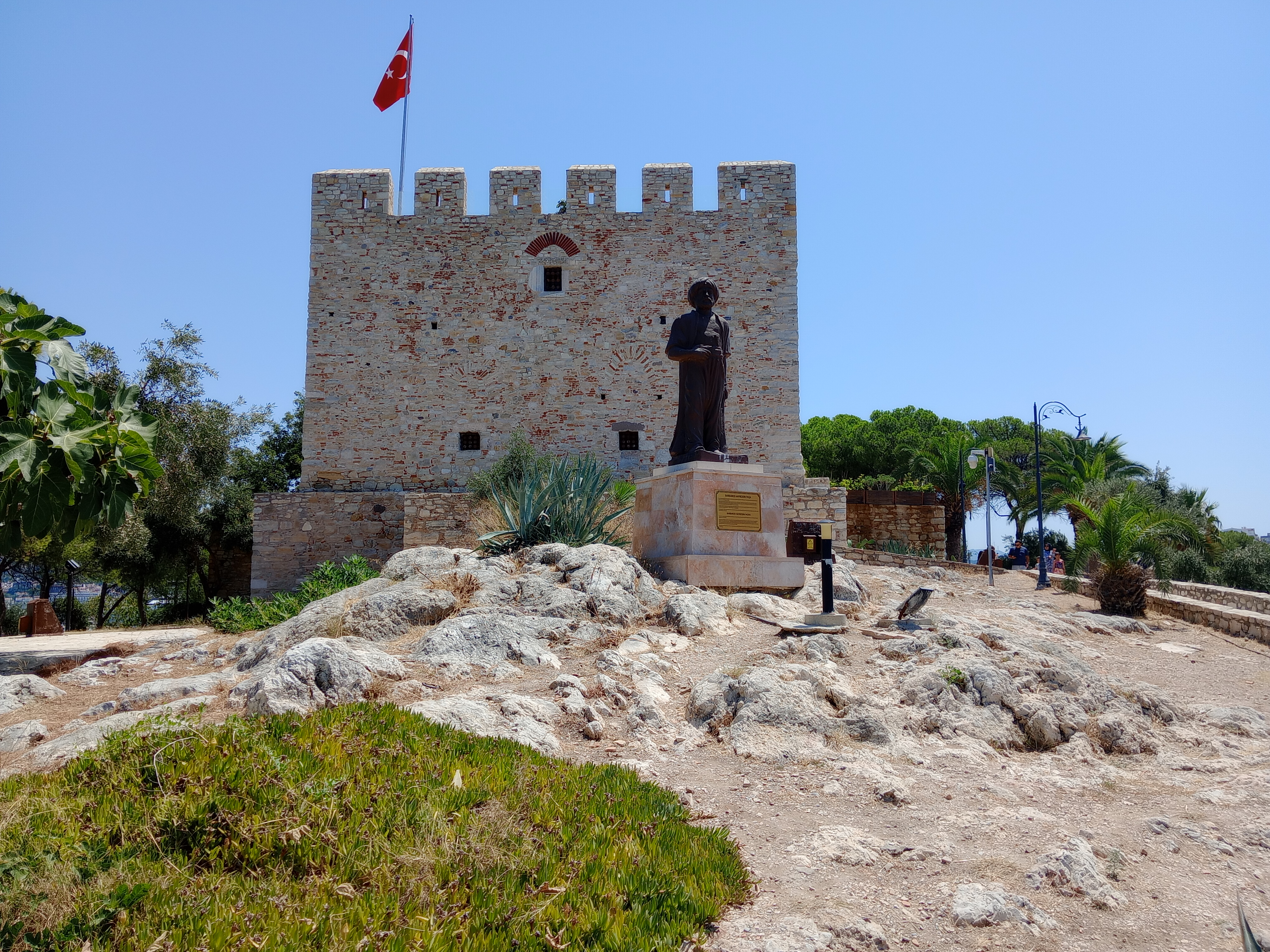
Top of Güvercinada Castle

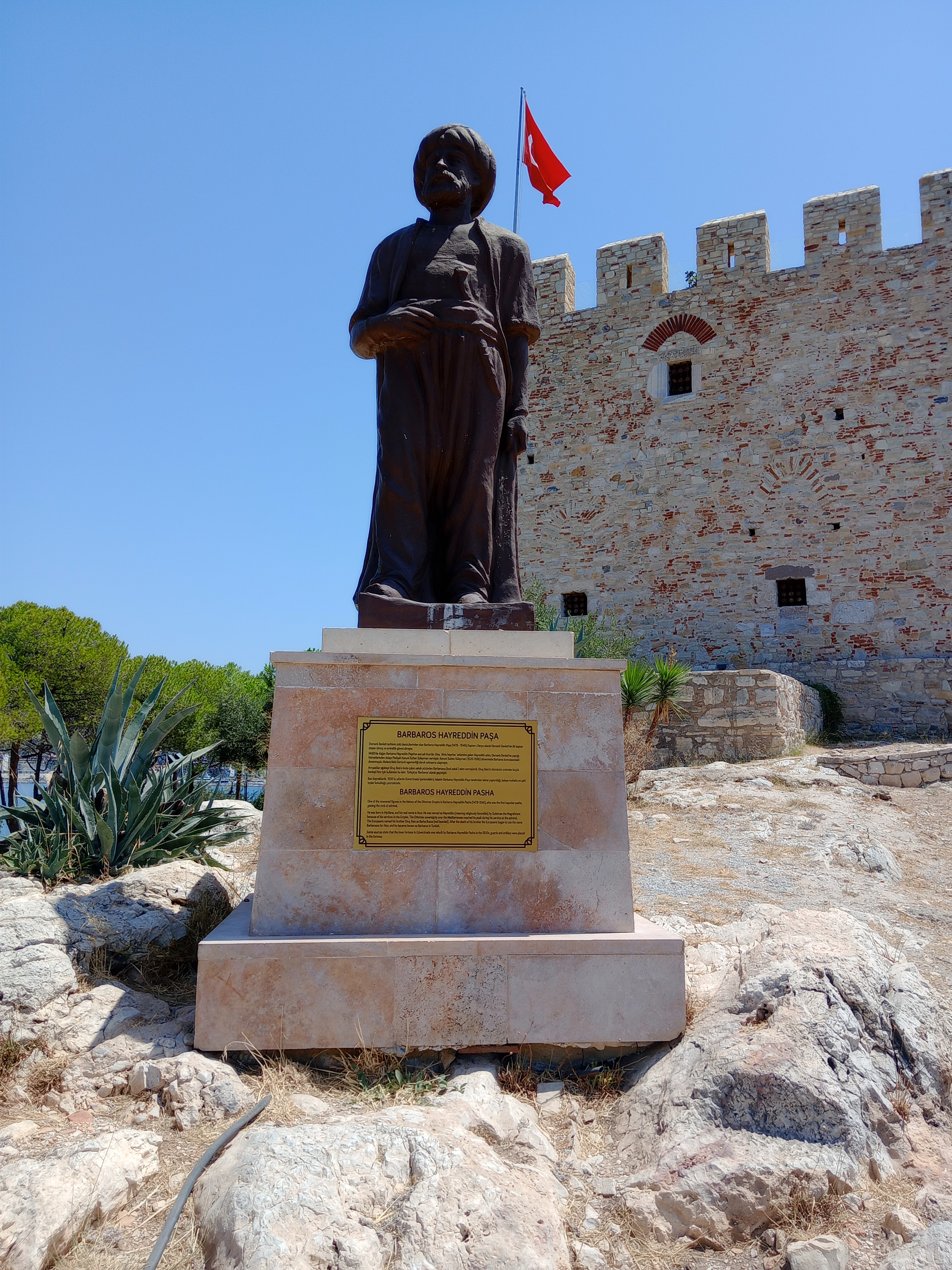
Statue of Hayreddin Barbarossa
