= Güzelçamlı =

- Neighbourhood
- Location in Turkey Güzelçamlı (Turkey Aegean)
- Coordinates: 37°43′N 27°14′E
- Country: Turkey
- Province: Aydın
- District: Kuşadası
- Population (2022): 7,981
- Time zone: UTC+3 (TRT)

Güzelçamlı (also referred to locally as Çamlı for short) is a sea-side neighbourhood of the municipality and district of Kuşadası, Aydın Province, Turkey. Its population is 7,981 (2022). Before the 2013 reorganisation, it was a town (belde). It is an increasingly popular tourist resort. It is situated at a distance of 23 kilometres (14 mi) following the shoreline southwards from the district's center of Kuşadası. The town borders the Dilek Peninsula-Büyük Menderes Delta National Park to its immediate south. The town's permanent population is around 8,000 but may rise to around 50,000 and possibly more in the summer with the arrival of tourists and owners of secondary houses. Güzelçamlı is becoming increasingly renowned in the market for foreign purchases of real estate in Turkey.

== History ==
The history of Güzelçamlı dates as far back as 700 BC. In the Ionian era, the locality was the convention center of the Ionian city states and was named Panionium. The Ionians had formed a federation consisting of 12 Ionian cities and also held games here to mark their gatherings. During excavations in 1957 and 1958 an antique theater was uncovered, which had 12 rows of seats carved out of rock. Many famous battles were fought in this area, including the Battle of Mycale between the Greek and Persian forces.

During the Ottoman period, the town was often called Rumçamlısı (Greek Çamlı) or Tsagli (Τσαγκλι) and was entirely populated by Greeks. In the last phase of the Greco-Turkish War (1919-1922) (on 7 September 1922), with the Turkish army approaching, the town population had fled by boats and took refuge in the nearby island of Samos, after which the town had remained empty for about two years. In 1924, it has been re-populated by Turks from Leftere, near Kavala, under the scope of the population exchange between Greece and Turkey. The settlement's name was changed to Güzelçamlı, and after having had the status of a village for seventy years, Güzelçamlı was declared a township with its own municipality in 1992.

== Tourism ==
Today, Güzelçamlı is a preserved resort town. There are several hotels, small pensions, holiday houses, restaurants, bars and shops. Monday is the usual market day of the town, during which a traditional bazaar is set along the main street once a week. On the beaches and along the bays of the 30 km (19 mi) coastline, besides clean water, there are also opportunities for sailing, windsurfing, canoeing, water skiing, fishing, diving and boat tours. Other possibilities are paragliding, mountaineering, trekking, bird watching, botany tours, horse riding, cycling and hunting to an extent. The thermal and Turkish baths of Davutlar are 5 km (3 mi) away and provide services year-round. In Güzelçamlı, there is usually a breeze from the sea during the day and a breeze from the mountains during the nights.

The Cave of Zeus is west of the town, within the Dilek Peninsula-Büyük Menderes Delta National Park.

== See also ==
- Turkish Riviera
- Blue Cruise
- Foreign purchases of real estate in Turkey
