= Ladies Beach =

Ladies Beach may refer to:

- Ladies Beach, Ulcin, Montenegro
- Ladies Beach, Kuşadası, Turkey
- Ladies Beach, Abu Dhabi, location of the Abu Dhabi Presidential Palace
