= Cave of Zeus, Aydın =

Show cave in Turkey

Cave of Zeus
- Zeus Mağarası
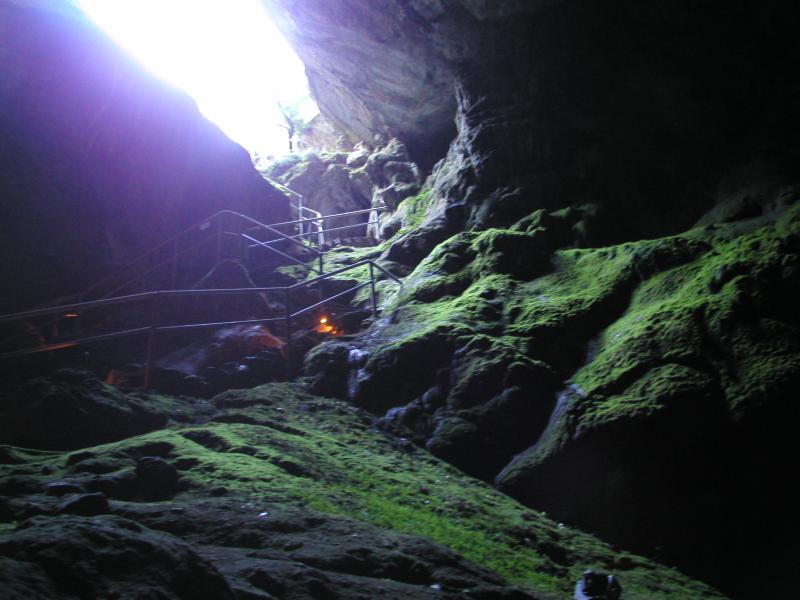
- A view of the cave near the entrance

- Location within Turkey
- Location: Dilek Peninsula-Büyük Menderes Delta National Park, Güzelçamlı, Kuşadası, Aydın, Turkey
- Coordinates: 37°42′41″N 27°12′57″E
- Depth: 10–15 m (33–49 ft)
- Length: 20 m (66 ft)

The Cave of Zeus (Turkish: Zeus Mağarası) is a show cave located in Kuşadası, Aydın Province, in the Aegean Region of western Turkey.

The cave is within Dilek Peninsula-Büyük Menderes Delta National Park, immediately west of the town of Güzelçamlı in Kuşadası district. It is situated about 200 m (660 ft) west of the national park's entrance at Dilek Peninsula. The cave is reached by a 20 m (66 ft) long slippery, stoney trail southwards. The cave's mouth is hidden from view, as it is covered with trees, plants and flowers. The cave can be accessed from the district's center of Kuşadası via dolmuş, which shuttle the route to and from Güzelçamlı regularly.

The cave was formed as a result of a sinkhole eroding a kalk formation by a subterranean river. Its base has the shape of a pool. The blue-green colored carbonated mineral water of the cave is a brackish mixture of spring water from the mountain and salty seawater. The deep pool attracts the attention of local and foreign visitors year-round for bathing and swimming. The cave is 10–15 m (33–49 ft) deep and 10–13 m (33–43 ft) wide with a length of 20 m (66 ft).

According to Ancient Greek mythology, Zeus, the Olympian ruler of the skies, used to hide in the cave to escape the fury of his brother Poseidon, the ruler of the seas after Zeus angered him. Poseidon, in his wrath, would unleash very high waves and other dangerous water conditions with his trident. As a popular habit, visitors tie a cloth piece on a wishing tree next to the cave's mouth in the hope that their wish comes true.

== See also ==
- Cave of Zeus in Crete, Greece
