= Ortygia (Ionia) =

Town of ancient Ionia

Coordinates: 37°49′47″N 27°20′21″E

Ortygia (Ancient Greek: Ὀρτυγία) was a town of ancient Ionia.

Its site is near Kirazlı, Asiatic Turkey.
