= Anaea (Asia) =

Anaea (or Anæa) (Ancient Greek: Ἄναια) is an ancient city, former bishopric and present Latin Catholic titular see in Asia Minor.

It gave its name to its modern location, Anya (Kadıkalesi) in the coastal village of Soğucak situated 8 kilometres (5.0 mi) to the south of Kuşadası in Aydın Province, Turkey.

== History ==
From the Archaic period, Anaea was a mainland dependency of Samos. In times of stasis (civil strife) in Samos, the losing party would often flee to Anaea, from which they would eventually mount counter-attacks. After the defeat of the Revolt of Mytilene, when Alcidas was anchored at Ephesus, a deputation of Samians from Anaia came to him.

A detailed Samian law dealing with the sale and distribution of grain from Anaea and the establishment of a lending fund from the profits survives from the Hellenistic period.

Anaea was important enough in the Roman province of Asia Prima to become a suffragan bishopric of its capital Ephesus's Metropolitan Archbishopric. Yet it would fade.

In 1413 it was conquered by the Ottomans.

== Archeology ==
Archaeologists discovered many ceramics. The presence of so many ceramics in different colors, shapes and designs confirms that there was a rich production capacity in Anaea. They also revealed paw prints of cats and dogs on bricks and tiles dating back to the 8th century. These traces belong to animals which walked on these potteries when they were left to dry by producers. There is also a castle which served as an acropolis for many years and was home to a church built in the 5th century. After the Ottomans conquered the city they build a mosque next to the church. The Ottomans used the castle as a shield during WWI.

== Titular see ==
The diocese was nominally restored in 1933 as Anæa (Curiate Italian form Anea).

It is vacant for decades, having had the following incumbents, all of the lowest (episcopal) rank :

- William Tibertus McCarty, Redemptorists (C.SS.R.) (1943.01.02 – 1948.03.11), as Auxiliary Bishop of the then Military Vicariate of United States of America (USA) (1943.01.02 – 1947.04.10) and Coadjutor Bishop of Rapid City '1947.04.10 – 1948.03.11), later succeeded as Bishop of Rapid City (USA) (1948.03.11 – 1969.09.11), emeritate as Titular Bishop of Rotdon (1969.09.11 – 1971.01.13)
- Alfredo Antonio Francisco Müller y San Martín (1948.03.13 – 1961.04.07) as Auxiliary Bishop of La Habana (Cuba) (1948.03.13 – 1961.04.07), later succeeded as Bishop of Cienfuegos (Cuba) (1961.04.07 – 1971.06.30), restyled Bishop of Cienfuegos–Santa Clara (Cuba) (1971.06.30 – 1971.07.24)
- Giovanni Picco (1962.11.15 – death 1984.08.14), initially as Auxiliary Bishop of Vercelli (Italy) (1962.11.15 – 1967)

== Source and External links ==
- GCatholic, with titular incumbent biography links
- Turkish Ministry of Tourism page
