= Kadıkalesi, Kuşadası =

Village in Turkey

Kadıkalesi
- Neighbourhood
- Location in Turkey Kadıkalesi (Turkey Aegean)
- Coordinates: 37°47′13″N 27°16′12″E
- Country: Turkey
- Province: Aydın
- District: Kuşadası
- Population (2024): 762
- Time zone: UTC+3 (TRT)

Kadıkalesi is a neighbourhood in the municipality and district of Kuşadası, Aydın Province, Turkey. Its population is 762 (2024).
