= Hacıfeyzullah, Kuşadası =

Village in Turkey

Hacıfeyzullah
- Neighbourhood
- Location in Turkey Hacıfeyzullah (Turkey Aegean)
- Coordinates: 37°51′14″N 27°15′02″E
- Country: Turkey
- Province: Aydın
- District: Kuşadası
- Population (2024): 10,712
- Time zone: UTC+3 (TRT)

Hacıfeyzullah is a neighbourhood in the municipality and district of Kuşadası, Aydın Province, Turkey. Its population is 10,712 (2024).
