= Ege, Kuşadası =

Village in Turkey

Ege
- Neighbourhood
- Location in Turkey Ege (Turkey Aegean)
- Coordinates: 37°51′42″N 27°17′07″E
- Country: Turkey
- Province: Aydın
- District: Kuşadası
- Population (2024): 17,032
- Time zone: UTC+3 (TRT)

Ege is a neighbourhood in the municipality and district of Kuşadası, Aydın Province, Turkey. Its population is 17,032 (2024).
