= Karaova, Kuşadası =

Village in Turkey

Karaova
- Neighbourhood
- Location in Turkey Karaova (Turkey Aegean)
- Coordinates: 37°47′59″N 27°16′28″E
- Country: Turkey
- Province: Aydın
- District: Kuşadası
- Population (2024): 4,209
- Time zone: UTC+3 (TRT)

Karaova is a neighbourhood in the municipality and district of Kuşadası, Aydın Province, Turkey. Its population is 4,209 (2024).
