= Türkmen, Kuşadası =

Village in Turkey

Türkmen
- Neighbourhood
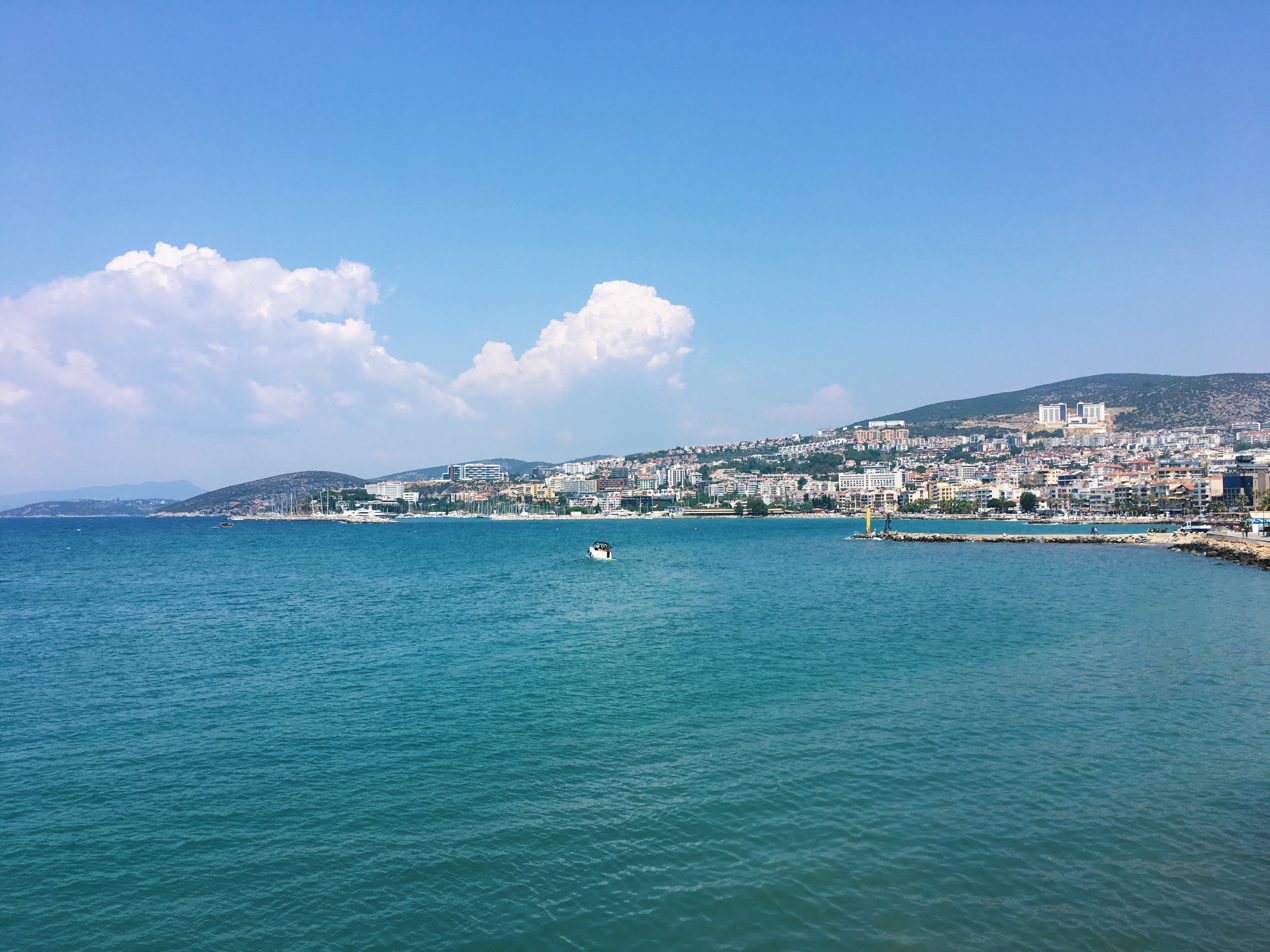

- Location within Turkey Location within Turkey Aegean
- Coordinates: 37°52′15″N 27°16′08″E
- Country: Turkey
- Province: Aydın
- District: Kuşadası
- Population (2024): 13,816
- Time zone: UTC+3 (TRT)

Türkmen is a neighbourhood in the municipality and district of Kuşadası, Aydın Province, Turkey. Its population is 13,816 (2024).
