= Yeniköy, Kuşadası =

Yeniköy
- Neighbourhood
- Country: Turkey
- Province: Aydın
- District: Kuşadası
- Population (2022): 922
- Time zone: UTC+3 (TRT)

Yeniköy is a neighbourhood in the municipality and district of Kuşadası, Aydın Province, Turkey. Its population is 922 (2022).
