= Cumhuriyet, Kuşadası =

Village in Turkey

Cumhuriyet
- Neighbourhood
- Location in Turkey Cumhuriyet (Turkey Aegean)
- Coordinates: 37°51′26″N 27°15′50″E
- Country: Turkey
- Province: Aydın
- District: Kuşadası
- Population (2024): 4,252
- Time zone: UTC+3 (TRT)

Cumhuriyet is a neighbourhood in the municipality and district of Kuşadası, Aydın Province, Turkey. Its population is 4,252 (2024).
