= Yavansu, Kuşadası =

Village in Turkey

Yavansu
- Neighbourhood
- Location in Turkey Yavansu (Turkey Aegean)
- Coordinates: 37°49′24″N 27°15′43″E
- Country: Turkey
- Province: Aydın
- District: Kuşadası
- Population (2024): 2,135
- Time zone: UTC+3 (TRT)

Yavansu is a neighbourhood in the municipality and district of Kuşadası, Aydın Province, Turkey. Its population is 2,135 (2024).
