= Çınarköy, Kuşadası =

Çınarköy
- Neighbourhood
- Location in Turkey Çınarköy (Turkey Aegean)
- Coordinates: 37.8458°N 27.3804°E
- Country: Turkey
- Province: Aydın
- District: Kuşadası
- Population (2022): 362
- Time zone: UTC+3 (TRT)

Çınarköy is a neighbourhood in the municipality and district of Kuşadası, Aydın Province, Turkey. Its population is 362 (2022).
