= Bayraklıdede, Kuşadası =

Village in Turkey

Bayraklıdede
- Neighbourhood
- Location in Turkey Bayraklıdede (Turkey Aegean)
- Coordinates: 37°53′47″N 27°16′23″E
- Country: Turkey
- Province: Aydın
- District: Kuşadası
- Population (2024): 3,344
- Time zone: UTC+3 (TRT)

Bayraklıdede is a neighbourhood in the municipality and district of Kuşadası, Aydın Province, Turkey. Its population is 3,344 (2024).
