= Cosco (disambiguation) =

Cosco or COSCO may refer to:

== Companies ==
- COSCO, the China Ocean Shipping Company; a holding company
  - COSCO Shipping, a ship owner
    - COSCO Shipping Holdings, a transport company
      - COSCO Shipping Lines, a shipping line
- Cosco (India) Limited, a sports equipment company in India
- Cosco, a division of Dorel Industries
- Cosco Capital, a Philippine conglomerate

== Other uses ==
- COSCO Tower, Victoria, Hong Kong; an office tower

== See also ==
- Costco
- Cusco (disambiguation)
- COS (disambiguation), including companies named COS
