= Kadınlardenizi, Kuşadası =

Village in Turkey

Kadınlardenizi
- Neighbourhood
- Location in Turkey Kadınlardenizi (Turkey Aegean)
- Coordinates: 37°50′32″N 27°14′59″E
- Country: Turkey
- Province: Aydın
- District: Kuşadası
- Population (2024): 13,994
- Time zone: UTC+3 (TRT)

Kadınlardenizi is a neighbourhood in the municipality and district of Kuşadası, Aydın Province, Turkey. Its population is 13,994 (2024).
