= Cusco (disambiguation) =

Cusco (also often spelled Cuzco) is the Inca capital in modern Peru and the most populous city in the Andes.

Cusco or Cuzco may also refer to:

== Places ==
=== Peru ===
- Cusco Department, geographic and political region in Peru with Cusco city as its capital
- Cusco Province, province in the Cusco Region
- Cusco District, district in Cusco Province
- Historic Centre of Cuzco, a UNESCO World Heritage Site located within the city of the same name

=== Elsewhere ===
- Cuzco (Madrid Metro), a station on Line 10 in Madrid, Spain
- Cuzco, Indiana, a small town in the United States

== Other uses ==
- Cusco (band), a German cross-cultural new age band named after the Inca capital city
- CUSCO Japan, Japanese automotive suspensions parts company

== See also ==
- Kuzco, a fictional character from the movie The Emperor's New Groove
- Cosco (disambiguation)
- CUS (disambiguation), including companies called CUS
