= Camiatik, Kuşadası =

Village in Turkey

Camiatik
- Neighbourhood
- Location in Turkey Camiatik (Turkey Aegean)
- Coordinates: 37°51′20″N 27°15′19″E
- Country: Turkey
- Province: Aydın
- District: Kuşadası
- Population (2024): 3,153
- Time zone: UTC+3 (TRT)

Camiatik is a neighbourhood in the municipality and district of Kuşadası, Aydın Province, Turkey. Its population is 3,153 (2024).
