= Caferli, Kuşadası =

Caferli
- Neighbourhood
- Location in Turkey Caferli (Turkey Aegean)
- Coordinates: 37.7500°N 27.3167°E
- Country: Turkey
- Province: Aydın
- District: Kuşadası
- Population (2022): 158
- Time zone: UTC+3 (TRT)

Caferli is a neighbourhood in the municipality and district of Kuşadası, Aydın Province, Turkey. Its population is 158 (2022).
