= Dağ, Kuşadası =

Village in Turkey

Dağ
- Neighbourhood
- Location in Turkey Dağ (Turkey Aegean)
- Coordinates: 37°51′35″N 27°15′23″E
- Country: Turkey
- Province: Aydın
- District: Kuşadası
- Population (2024): 326
- Time zone: UTC+3 (TRT)

Dağ is a neighbourhood in the municipality and district of Kuşadası, Aydın Province, Turkey. Its population is 326 (2024).
