= Değirmendere, Kuşadası =

Village in Turkey

Değirmendere
- Neighbourhood
- Location in Turkey Değirmendere (Turkey Aegean)
- Coordinates: 37°49′43″N 27°16′44″E
- Country: Turkey
- Province: Aydın
- District: Kuşadası
- Population (2024): 10,884
- Time zone: UTC+3 (TRT)

Değirmendere is a neighbourhood in the municipality and district of Kuşadası, Aydın Province, Turkey. Its population is 10,884 (2024).
