= Yaylaköy, Kuşadası =

Yaylaköy
- Neighbourhood
- Location in Turkey Yaylaköy (Turkey Aegean)
- Coordinates: 37°46′37″N 27°19′33″E
- Country: Turkey
- Province: Aydın
- District: Kuşadası
- Population (2022): 751
- Time zone: UTC+3 (TRT)

Yaylaköy is a neighbourhood in the municipality and district of Kuşadası, Aydın Province, Turkey. Its population is 751 (2022).
