= İkiçeşmelik, Kuşadası =

Village in Turkey

İkiçeşmelik
- Neighbourhood
- Location in Turkey İkiçeşmelik (Turkey Aegean)
- Coordinates: 37°50′46″N 27°17′40″E
- Country: Turkey
- Province: Aydın
- District: Kuşadası
- Population (2024): 16,536
- Time zone: UTC+3 (TRT)

İkiçeşmelik is a neighbourhood in the municipality and district of Kuşadası, Aydın Province, Turkey. Its population is 16,536 (2024).
