= Camikebir, Kuşadası =

Village in Turkey

Camikebir
- Neighbourhood
- Location in Turkey Camikebir (Turkey Aegean)
- Coordinates: 37°51′39″N 27°15′30″E
- Country: Turkey
- Province: Aydın
- District: Kuşadası
- Population (2024): 1,010
- Time zone: UTC+3 (TRT)

Camikebir is a neighbourhood in the municipality and district of Kuşadası, Aydın Province, Turkey. Its population is 1,010 (2024).
