= Alacamescit, Kuşadası =

Village in Turkey

Alacamescit
- Neighbourhood
- Location in Turkey Alacamescit (Turkey Aegean)
- Coordinates: 37°51′24″N 27°15′33″E
- Country: Turkey
- Province: Aydın
- District: Kuşadası
- Population (2024): 995
- Time zone: UTC+3 (TRT)

Alacamescit is a neighbourhood in the municipality and district of Kuşadası, Aydın Province, Turkey. Its population is 995 (2024).
