= Ladies Beach, Kuşadası =

Beach in Turkey

Coordinates: 37.845°N 27.243°E

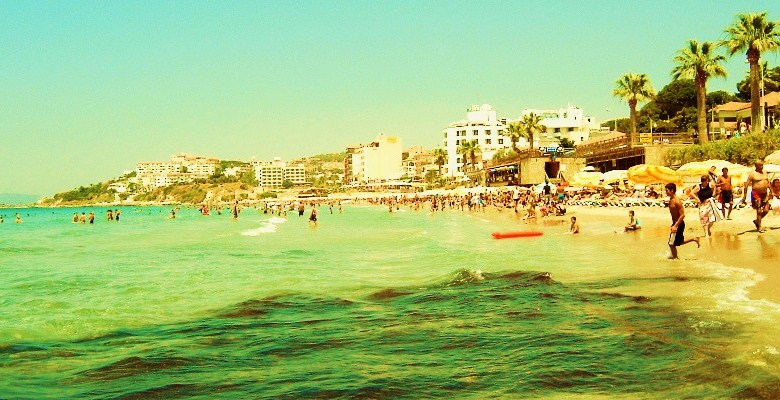
Ladies Beach

Ladies Beach (Turkish: Kadınlar Denizi) is a beach in Kuşadası, Aydın Province, Turkey. It is visited by local residents especially on Sundays. The beach is sandy. The Turkish name Kadınlar Denizi (Women's Sea) comes from the historical usage of the beach during the Ottoman period, when only women were allowed to swim there. Today, men and women are not separated.
