= Soğucak, Kuşadası =

Soğucak
- Neighbourhood
- Location in Turkey Soğucak (Turkey Aegean)
- Coordinates: 37.7839°N 27.2994°E
- Country: Turkey
- Province: Aydın
- District: Kuşadası
- Population (2022): 3,950
- Time zone: UTC+3 (TRT)

Soğucak is a neighbourhood in the municipality and district of Kuşadası, Aydın Province, Turkey. Its population is 3,950 (2022).
