= Gulf of Kuşadası =

Small gulf and strait in the Aegean Sea

Coordinates: 37°50′29″N 27°08′01″E

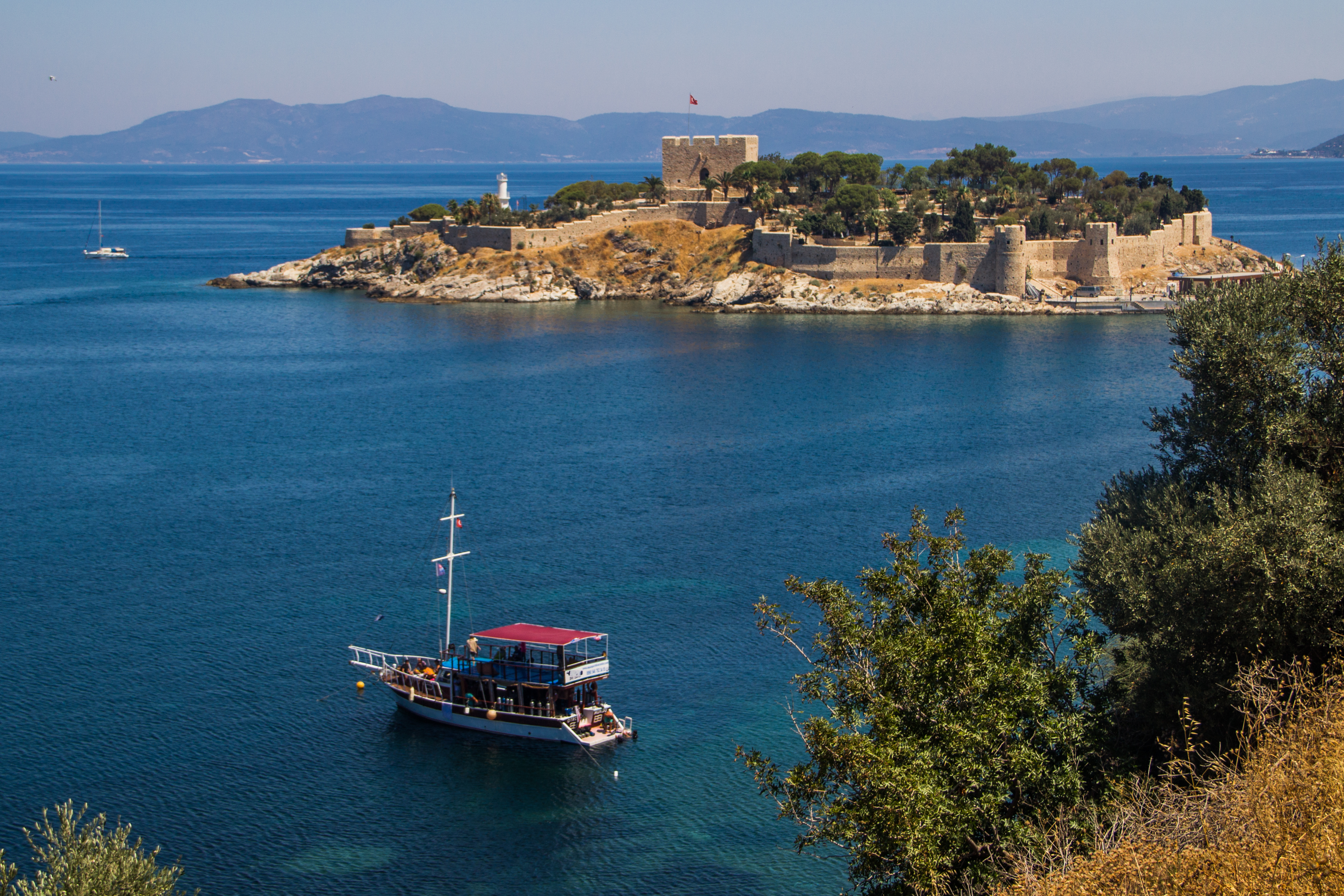
Kusadasi, Kuşadası/Aydın Province, Turkey

The Gulf of Kuşadası (Turkish: Kuşadası Körfezi) is a small gulf and strait in the Aegean Sea, separating the Greek island of Samos from the mainland of Turkey. Kuşadası is a resort town on Turkey's western Aegean coast, on the Gulf of Kuşadası. Samos in Greece borders the Gulf of Kuşadası to the north and east, and the mainland of Turkey borders the Gulf of Kuşadası to the west. The Mycale Strait also separates Samos Island from the Turkish mainland, and connects the Gulf of Kuşadası to the waters southwest of Turkey and south of the island of Samos.

On 30 October 2020, a deadly M_{w} 7.0 earthquake struck the gulf and triggered a small tsunami, killing 117 people in Turkey and two on the island of Samos.
