= Davutlar =

- Neighbourhood
- Location in Turkey Davutlar (Turkey Aegean)
- Coordinates: 37°44′N 27°18′E
- Country: Turkey
- Province: Aydın
- District: Kuşadası
- Elevation: 65 m (213 ft)
- Population (2022): 15,877
- Time zone: UTC+3 (TRT)
- Postal code: 09430
- Area code: 0256

Davutlar is a neighbourhood of the municipality and district of Kuşadası, Aydın Province, Turkey. Its population is 15,877 (2022). Before the 2013 reorganisation, it was a town (belde). It lies at the north of the Dilek Peninsula and south of Kuşadası. The original settlement is only a few kilometers to Aegean Sea side and presently new quarters of the town are established at the sea side as summer resorts. The distance to Kuşadası is 15 kilometres (9.3 mi) and to Aydın is 55 kilometres (34 mi).

== History ==
The area around Davutlar was ruled by Carians, Ionians, Lydians, Achaemenid Empire. The battle of Mycale (479 BC) was fought aff shore from Davutlar. Later the area was ruled by Alexander the Great, Pergamon Kingdom and Roman Empire. The first Turkic principality was founded in the 1090s by Tanrıbermiş. During the late 13th century the Aydınoğlu principality dominated the area and finally in the 15th century the area was annexed by the Ottoman Empire. The exact foundation date of the settlement is not known. But it was a town during the last years of the Ottoman Empire. The population of the town was enriched by refugees from Caucasus (mainly Circassians) after the Russo-Turkish War (1877–1878), from Crete following the revolt in Crete in 1896 and from various Balkan countries following the Balkan Wars (1912-1913.) Davutlar was declared a seat of township in 1969.

== Economy ==
The traditional economic sector is agriculture. Being an Aegean town, Davutlar produces fruits and vegetables. The main industry is olive oil, but the most important activity during the summers is tourism (trade and services to seaside resorts).
