= Kirazlı, Kuşadası =

Kirazlı
- Neighbourhood
- Location in Turkey Kirazlı (Turkey Aegean)
- Coordinates: 37°49′44″N 27°22′08″E
- Country: Turkey
- Province: Aydın
- District: Kuşadası
- Population (2022): 1,124
- Time zone: UTC+3 (TRT)

Kirazlı is a neighbourhood in the municipality and district of Kuşadası, Aydın Province, Turkey. Its population is 1,124 (2022).
