= Land ownership in Turkey =

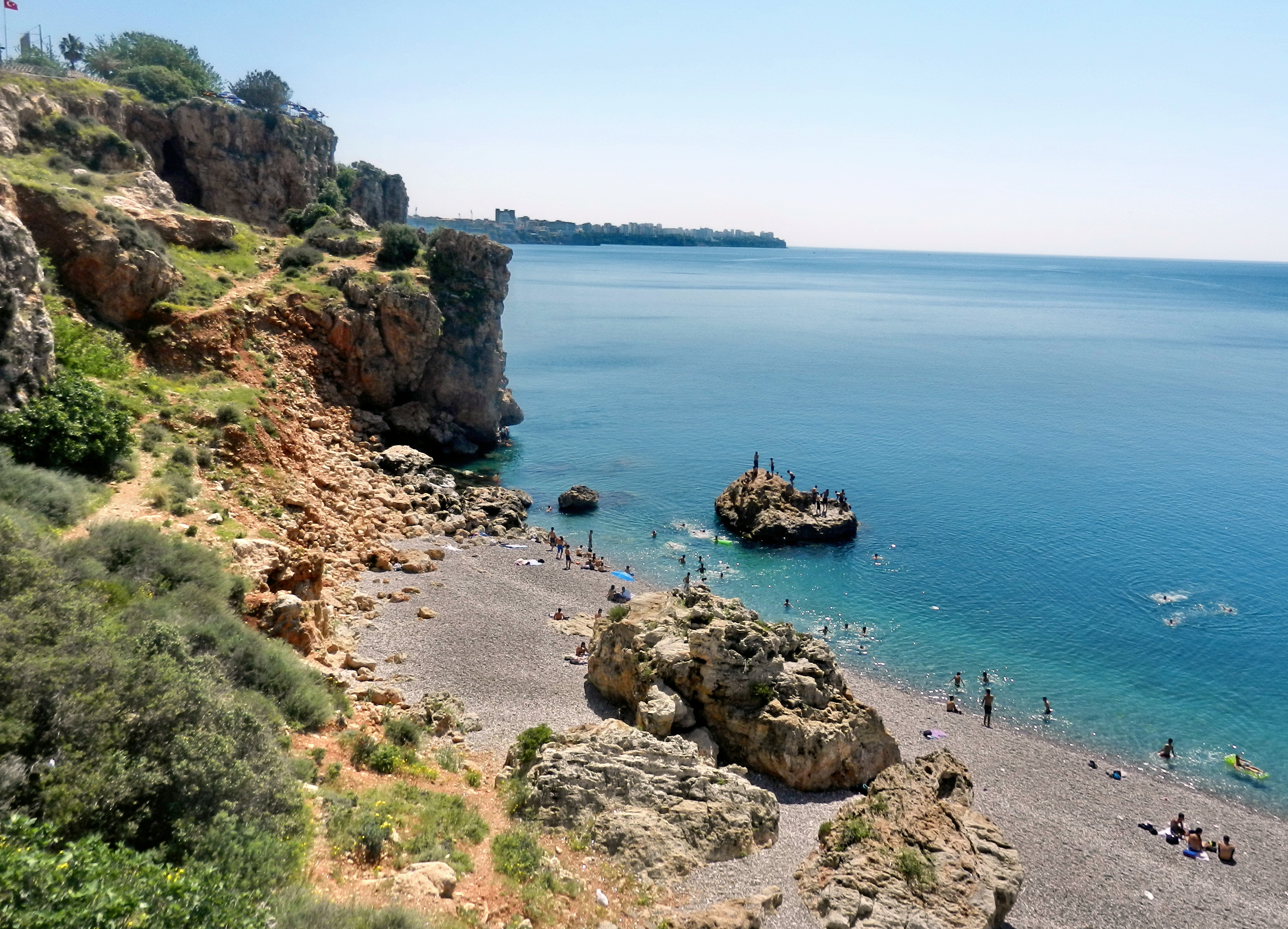
Turkish Riviera is the most popular destination of foreign purchases in Turkey.

Land ownership in Turkey had been constrained by the Ottoman Empire in the 19th century. This was to prevent foreigners from competing with natives for desirable property. This policy was continued when Turkey became independent in the early 20th century. The policy was relaxed during the 21st century.

In 2003, property purchases were opened to foreign nationals though restrictions were retained for various provinces. When these restrictions were violated in 2005, the law was annulled by Turkish courts. Despite this, property purchases continue. As of 2008, 63,085 properties had been sold to over 73,103 foreigners. This includes 38,623,661 square metres (415,741,630 sq ft) of land valued at US$10.4 billion, mostly by German, British and Greek citizens.

The Turkish government controls a high proportion of land, either directly, under the authority of the Undersecretariat of Treasury or indirectly through the inheritance and management of Ottoman foundations under the authority of the General Directorate for Foundations.

== History ==
During the weakening phase of the Ottoman Empire in the 19th century and the global dominance of new imperialism, purchases without constraint and effective surveillance of real estate by the nationals and companies of western powers was one of the issues on which the Ottoman state had been subjected to the direst foreign pressures. As a consequence of these pressures, The Ottoman Land Code of 1858 was passed, it's reformed taxation and land law. An 1858 firman on "Reform" had announced a grant of permission in this respect, but the necessary legal arrangements had been delayed till 1868. With the enactment of the 1868 regulation, according to one estimate, British capitalist-farmers (see Levantine mansions of İzmir) had almost immediately emerged as having acquired one third of all arable lands in the entire vilayet of İzmir (Aydın in name), possibly held in an indirect manner till then, and by 1878, the majority of the arable land in the same province. This trend coincided with the influx of refugees from lands lost for the Ottoman Empire, and the migrants often saw themselves having to buy property from foreigners in their own country. A further law in 1913 also allowed foreign legal entities (companies, foundations etc.) to purchase property in Ottoman lands, with decisive effects for the early foundations of the state of Israel. A partial about-face by the Committee of Union and Progress, simultaneous to the outbreak of the World War I in Europe, was one of the causes for the deterioration of relations between Turkey and the Allied powers Britain, France and Italy. The Treaty of Lausanne which established modern Turkey laid a ground based on a strict understanding of reciprocity in the matter, on a bilateral and contractual bases as concluded with individual countries at first, and full legal reciprocity after 1934.

== Legal framework ==
However, following steps taken by Turkey's main opposition party CHP, the modifications brought by the 2003 by-law were declared as void by the Constitutional Court of Turkey on 26 April 2005, in a decision to enter into effect as of 27 July 2005 and the purchase of real estate by foreign nationals was suspended until a modified law dated 7 January 2006 was brought into effect. This law, Law Nr. 5444, now enacted, instead of being a amendment modifying various paragraphs of the 1934 Property Act, is a fully stated legal text (still on the basis of a modification of the 1934 Act).

1. A foreign national cannot purchase more than 25,000 m^{2} (6 acres) of land (constructed or not) in Turkey without special consent from the Turkish Council of Ministers. The council of Ministers is authorised to increase this limit up to 300,000 m2 per person.
2. Foreign national ownership of real estate cannot exceed 10% of land in any designated town.
3. The property also has to be within a designated or zoned area in a municipality. Foreigners can not buy in villages.

== Foreign ownership market trends to 2005 ==
It was also observed that, during this 2-year period, the districts most favoured by foreign buyers were Alanya, Fethiye, Didim, Bodrum, Kuşadası along the coastline, as well as Ürgüp in Cappadocia. Alanya is a particularly preferred location for Germans and Scandinavians, while the British purchases are at their highest level of concentration in Fethiye and Didim.

== Controversy ==
The foreign purchase of real estate is a widely discussed subject in the Turkish media and among the public. Some of the opinions put forth in this context may not be based on sound facts, while others are results of in-depth studies. by the Chambers of Turkish Engineers and Architects - Chamber of Survey and Cadastre Engineers

Turkey's real estate agents have organised themselves to demarcate the definition and the boundaries of their profession and to discourage occasional and non-professional intermediaries. These efforts included professional standards established in 2004. Real estate agents are required to be members (and exhibit their membership) of the association set up for their region. These regional associations are organized within the framework of the national federation, Temfed, which provides a full list of the regional associations.

== Market data under the new legislation (after 7 January 2006) ==
Information on overseas buyers provided by the First Economic Counsellor of the Turkish Embassy in London for 2006 was as follows:

The most recent data provided by the Ministry, covering the period from 2002 (when the incumbent government came into office) to 2008 indicates a total of 63,085 land lots sold to 73,103 foreign private persons, extending to a total area of 25,350,361 square meters. As such, a total of seventy four seventy five thousand foreign nationals own an area of 38,623,661 square metres (415,741,630 sq ft) of lands in Turkey. As of 2007, on area basis the provinces of Muğla (4,445,259 square meters), Antalya (3,810,118 square meters), Aydın (3,001,075 square meters) came in the lead. On the basis of the number of foreign nationals acquiring property, the situation was as follows: Antalya (26,031 foreign nationals), Muğla (12,865 foreign nationals), Istanbul (8,830 foreign nationals), Aydın (7,415 foreign nationals), Bursa (5,241 foreign nationals), İzmir (4,145 foreign nationals). German nationals came the first in Antalya Province and British citizens in Muğla and Aydın Provinces. Purchases by Greek nationals displayed a striking preeminence in Istanbul and, in a more recent trend, in Bursa.

== See also ==
- Economy of Turkey
- Tourism in Turkey
- Marinas in Turkey
- Shopping malls in Turkey
