= Güvercinada =

Island in Turkey

Coordinates: 37°51′49″N 27°14′52″E

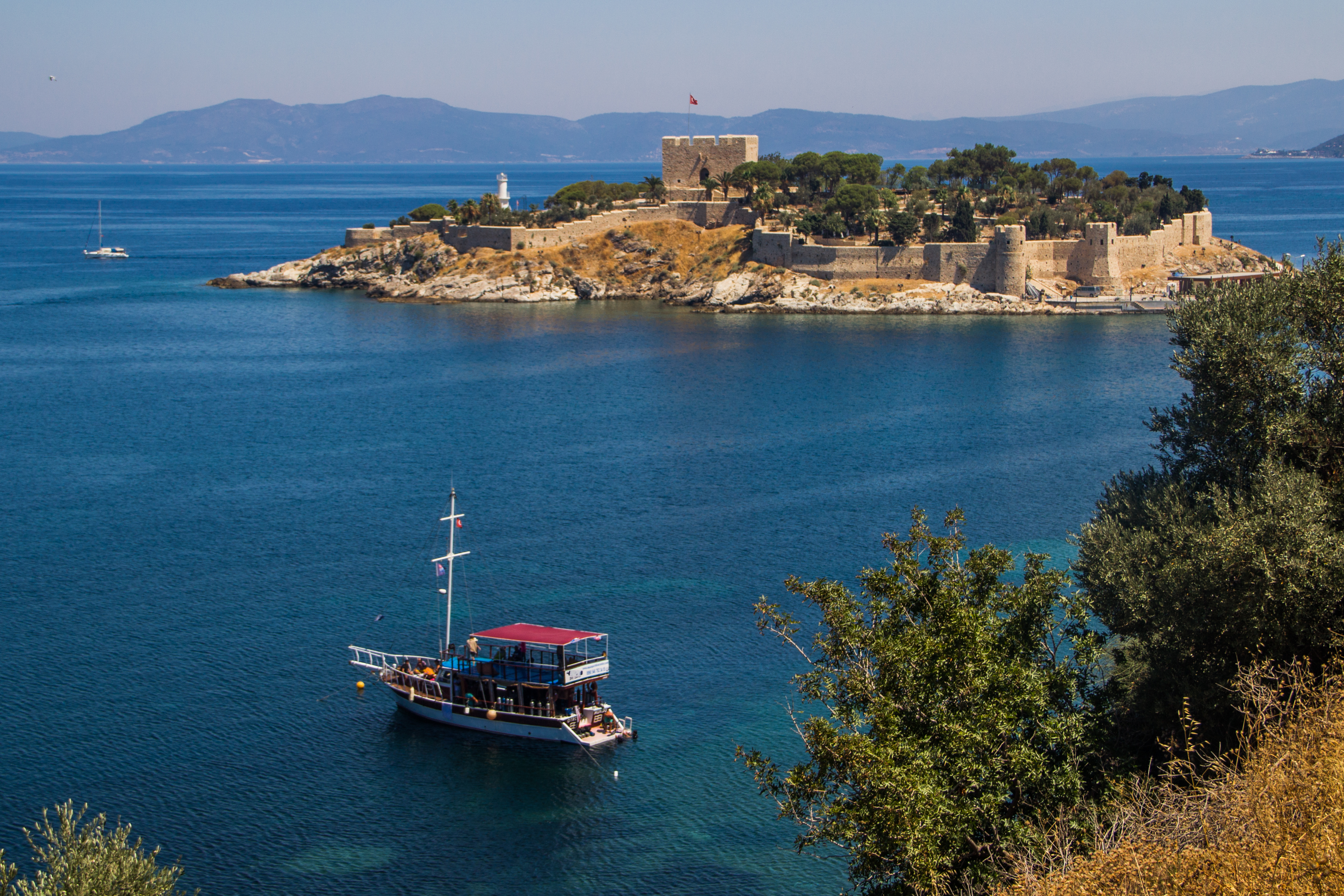
Güvercinada Island

Güvercinada (lit. 'Pigeon Island') is an island in western Turkey connected to mainland Kuşadası of Aydın Province via a relatively narrow, man-made causeway which is 350 m (1,150 ft) in length.

== Castle ==
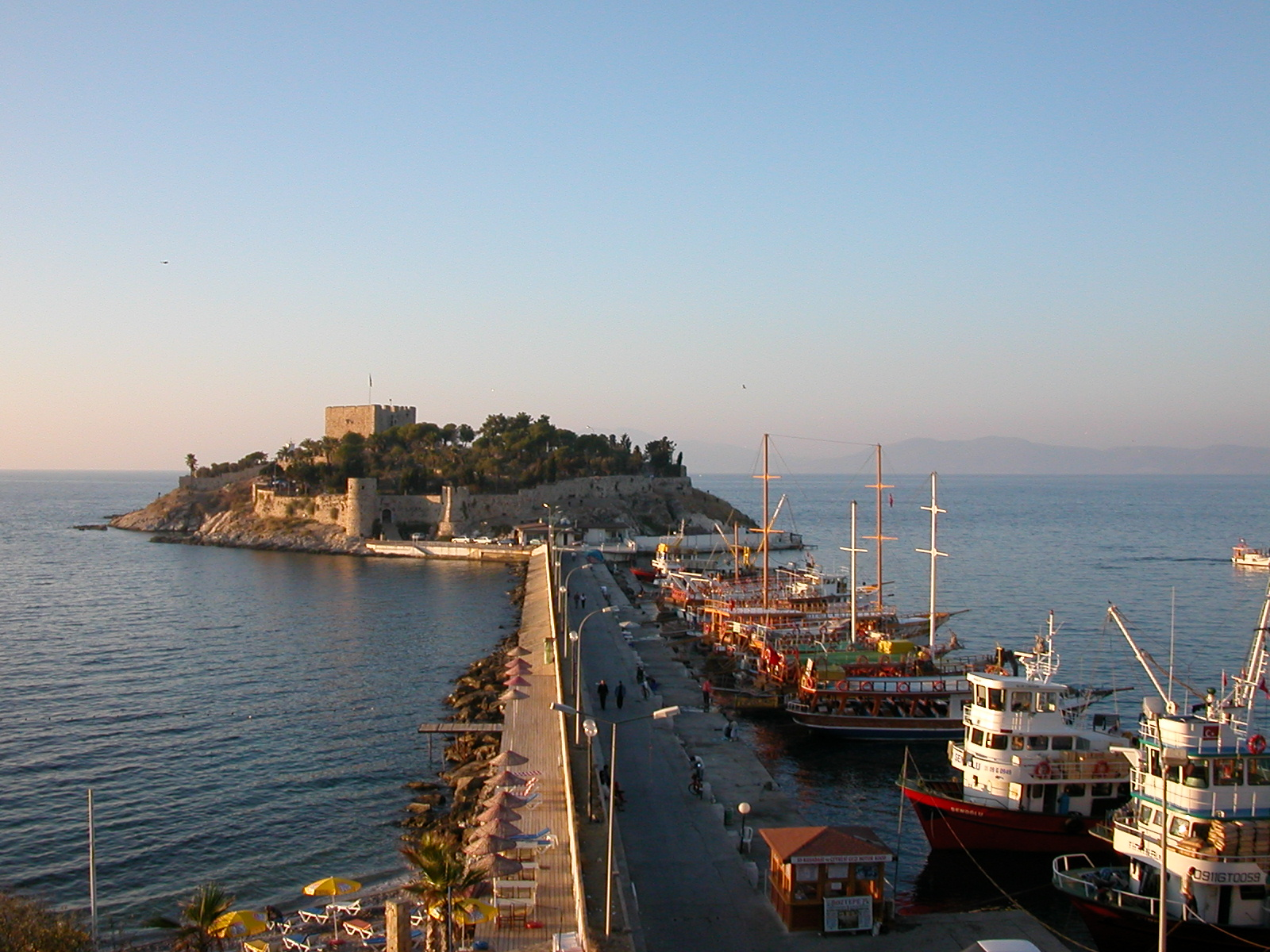
The causeway which connects Güvercinada Island with the mainland in Kuşadası.

There is a castle on the island, which is situated across the bay of Kuşadası. The castle walls were built by İlyas Agha while the citadel's construction was commissioned by the Ottoman admiral Hayreddin Barbarossa (c. 1478– 1546). The outer walls were built in order to prevent an attack from the islands during the Greek Orlov Revolt (1770). The castle walls, 3 m (9.8 ft) in height, surround the island completely. The stone material used for the construction were brought form a quarry at Yılancıburnu. The castle gate is situated to eastern direction in the south of the castle, and is flanked by two towers. The northern tower has a pentagon form while the southern one is cylindric. The inscription over the castle gate is missing as known from its empty place. An inscription on the northern tower consists of four lines, and dates to 1242 AH (1826 AD). The castle became a Tentative World Heritage Site in 2020.

== Nearby ==
The Kuşadası Bazaar's historical Kusadasi City Walls are nearby.
