= Kuşadası =

- District and municipality
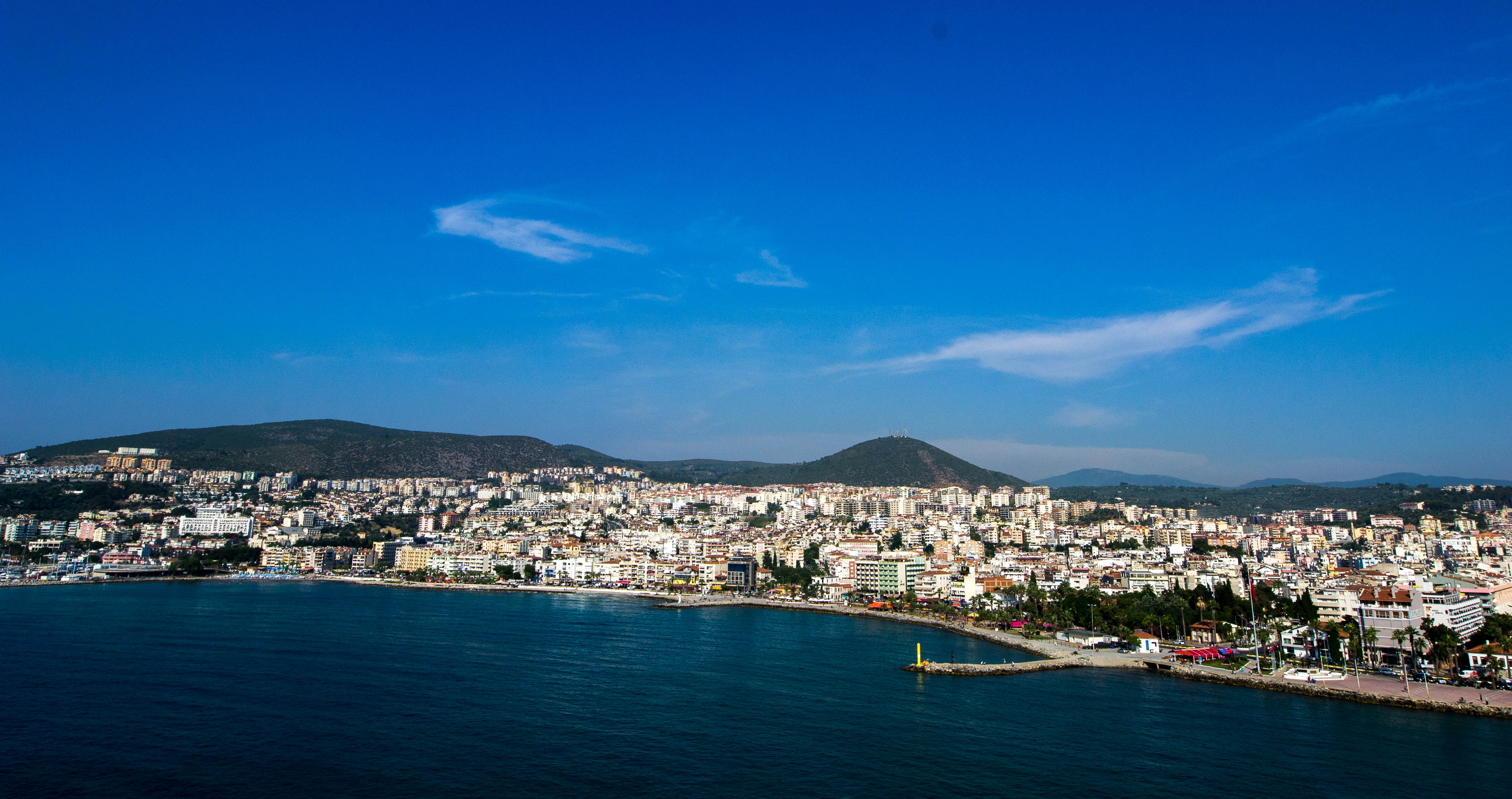
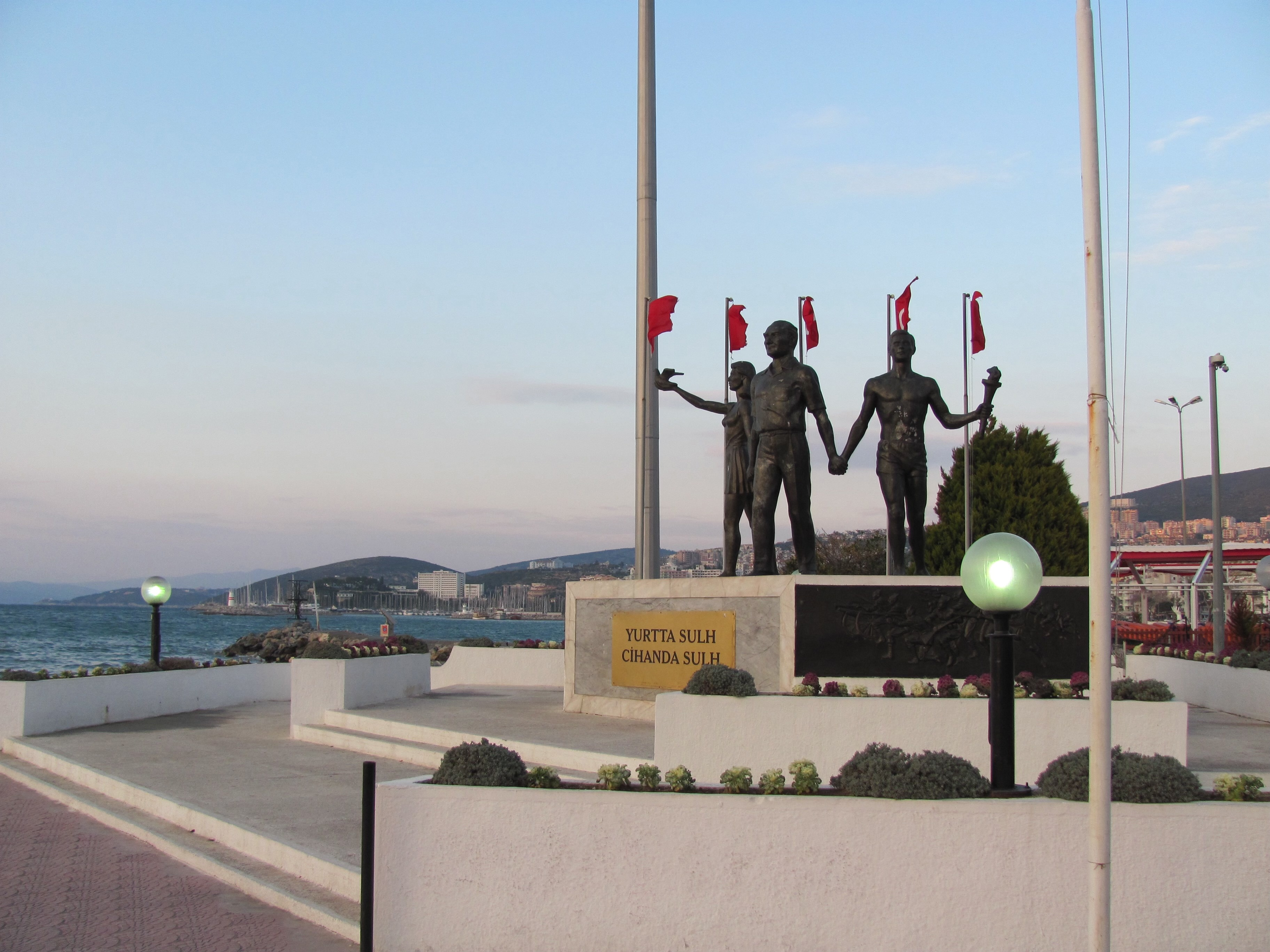
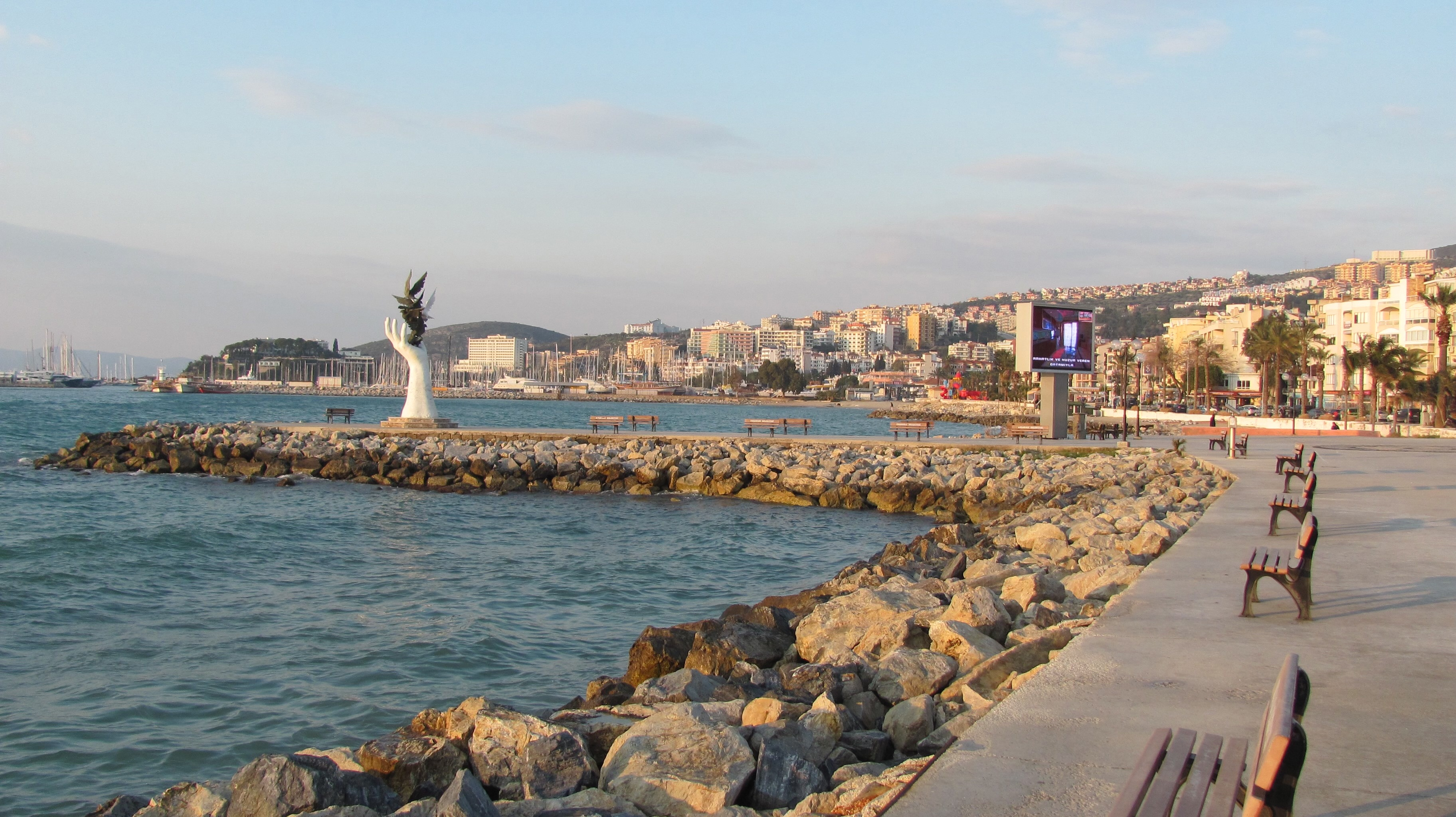
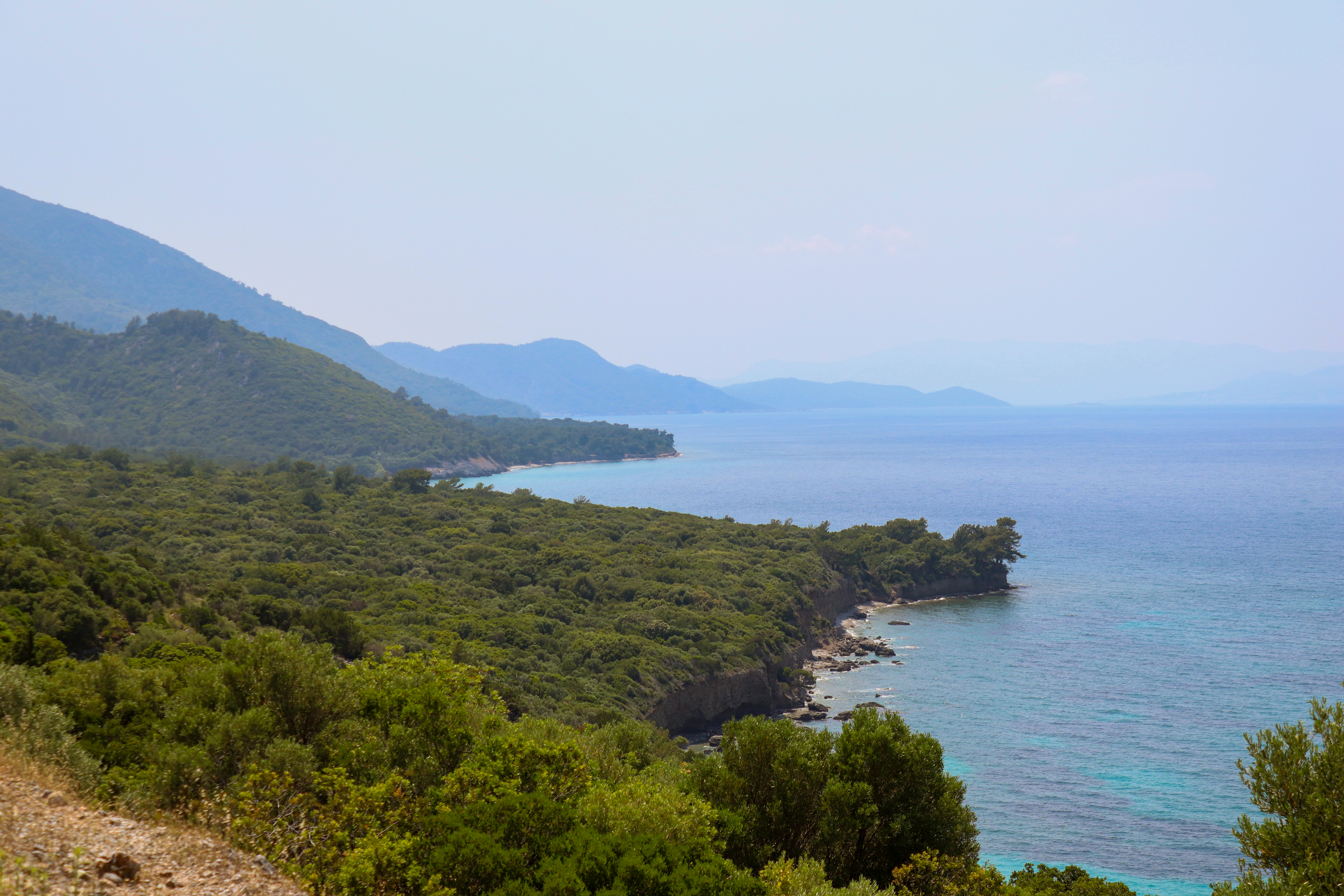
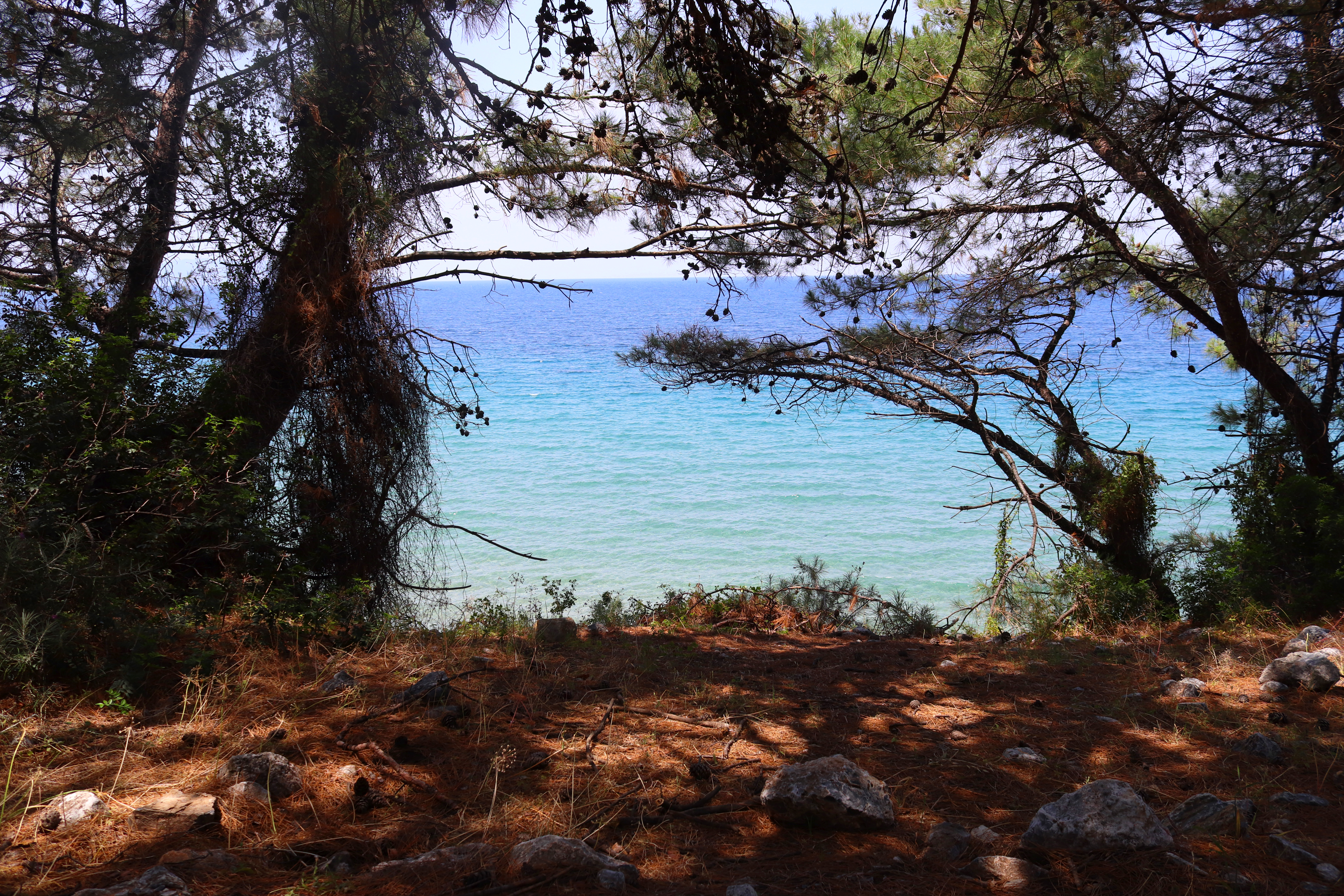
- Wide-angle view of Kuşadası downtown Statue of Mustafa Kemal Atatürk in the centre The shoreline with the Pigeons in Hand statue Dilek Peninsula-Büyük Menderes Delta National Park A forest area by the sea on the Dilek Peninsula

- Logo

- Map showing Kuşadası District in Aydın Province

- Location within Turkey Location within Turkey Aegean
- Coordinates: 37°51′35″N 27°15′35″E
- Country: Turkey
- Province: Aydın

Government
  - Mayor: Ömer Günel (CHP)
- Area: 265 km^{2} (102 sq mi)
- Population (2022): 130,835
  - Density: 494/km^{2} (1,280/sq mi)
- Time zone: UTC+3 (TRT)
- Postal code: 09400
- Area code: 0256
- Website: www.kusadasi.bel.tr

Kuşadası (Turkish: [ˈkuʃadasɯ]) is a municipality and district of Aydın Province, Turkey. Its area is 265 km^{2}, and its population is 130,835 (2022). It is a large resort town on the Aegean coast. Kuşadası is 95 km (59 mi) south of İzmir, and about 60 km (37 mi) west of Aydın. The municipality's primary industry is tourism. The mayor of the district is Ömer Günel.

== Etymology ==
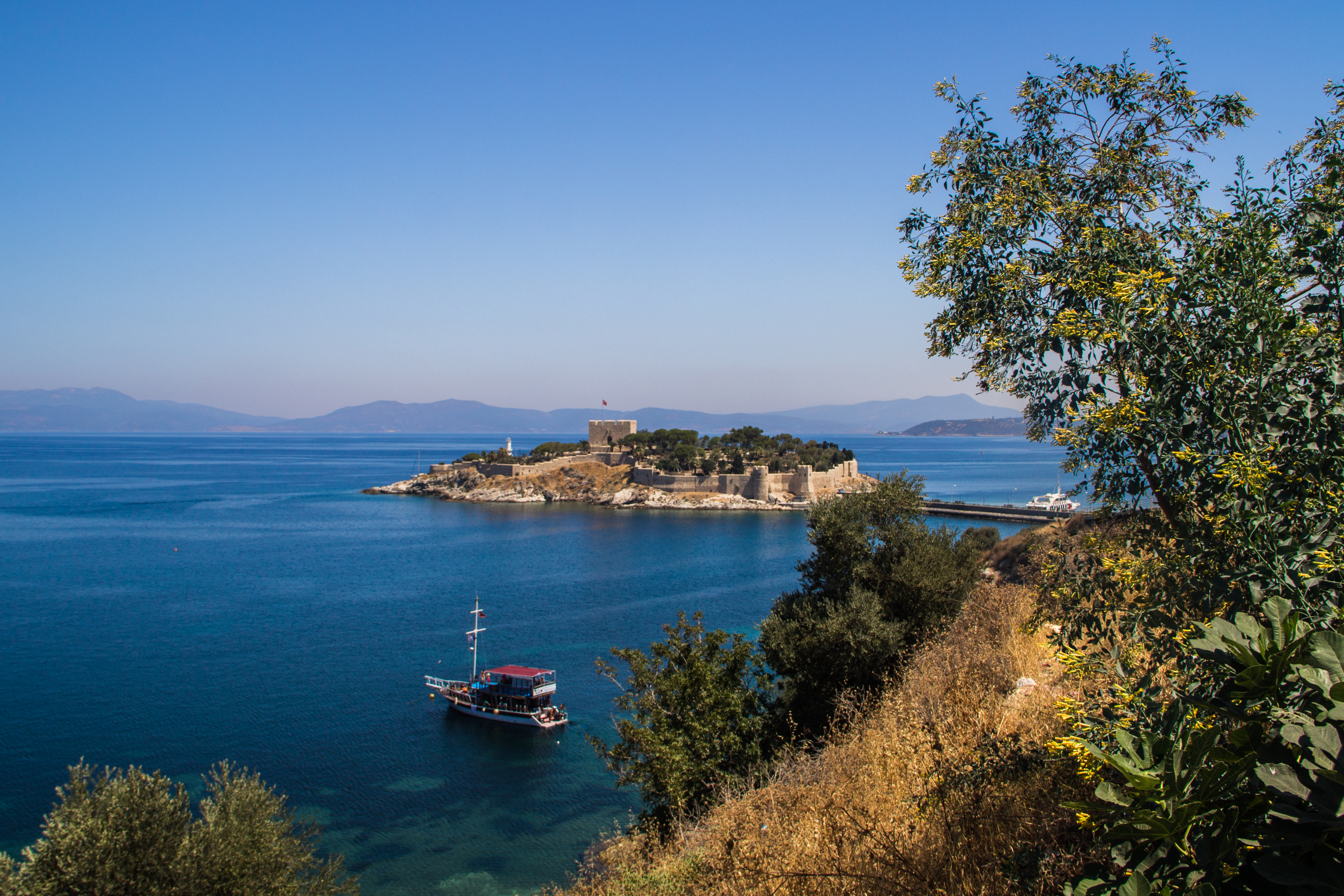
Güvercinada ("Pigeon Island") derives its name in a similar fashion to Kuşadası ("Bird Island").

The name Kuşadası comes from Turkish kuş 'bird' + ada 'island', as Güvercinada island, just offshore, has the shape of a bird's head when seen from the sea. It was known as Ephesus Neopolis (Greek: Ἔφεσος Νεόπολις) during the Byzantine era, and as Scala Nova or Scala Nuova under Frankish rule. Kuş Adası was adopted during the Ottoman period at the beginning of the 20th century. Today, the citizens of Kuşadası often shorten the town's name to Ada.

== History ==
=== Antiquity ===
The area has been a centre of art and culture since some of the earliest recorded history, and has been settled by many civilizations since being founded by the Leleges people in 3000 BC. Later settlers include the Aeolians in the 11th century BC and Ionians in the 9th. Originally, seamen and traders built a number of settlements along the coastline, including Neopolis.

An outpost of Ephesus in ancient Ionia, known as Pygela (Πύγελα) was located in the area between the Büyük Menderes (Maeander) and Gediz (Hermos) rivers. The original Neopolis, is thought to have been founded on the nearby point of Yılancı Burnu. Later settlements were probably built on the hillside of Pilavtepe, in the district called Andızkulesi today. Kuşadası was a minor port frequented by vessels trading along the Aegean coast. In antiquity it was overshadowed by Ephesus, until Ephesus' harbor silted up. From the 7th century BC onwards the coast was ruled by Lydians from their capital at Sardis, then from 546 BC the Persians, and from 334 BC, along with all of Anatolia, the coast was conquered by Alexander the Great. From that point on the coastal cities in Anatolia became a centre of Hellenistic culture.

=== Rome and Christianity ===
The Roman Empire took possession of the coast in the 2nd century BC and made it their provincial capital in the early years of Christianity. Saint John the Evangelist and (according to Roman Catholic sacred tradition) the Virgin Mary both came to live in the area, which in the Christian era became known as "Ania".

As Byzantine, Venetian and Genoese shippers began to trade along the coast, the port was re-founded (by the name of Scala Nova or Scala Nuova, meaning "New Port"), a garrison was placed on the island, and the town centre shifted from the hillside to the coast.

The city had a Jewish population as early as 1307, when a number of Jews were expelled from Scala Nova to Smyrna. Following the Expulsion of Jews from Spain, 250 Jewish families went to Scala Nova. Plague and cholera epidemics in the 18th and 19th centuries drastically reduced the population to around 65 families by 1865. In 1905, the Jewish Encyclopedia indicated that there were 33 families living in the city, some of them immigrants from Morea following the Greek Revolution.

=== The Turkish era ===
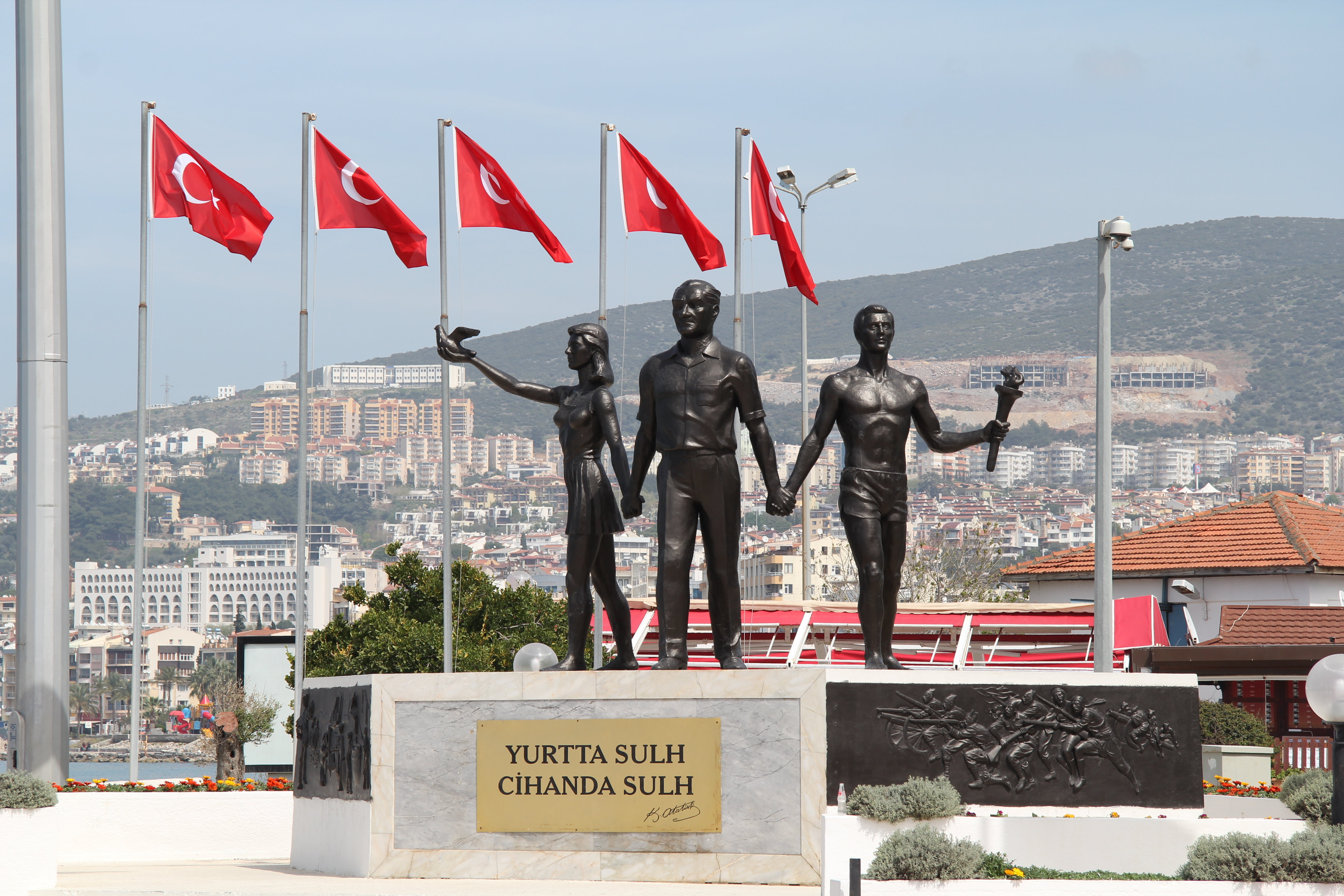
Atatürk Memorial in Kuşadası

Long afterwards, in 1834, the castle and garrison on the island were rebuilt and expanded, becoming the focus of the town. This was to such an extent that people began to refer to the whole town as Kuşadası (bird island). However, in the 19th century, trade began to decline in favor of other nearby cities with the opening of the İzmir-Selçuk-Aydın railway, which bypassed Kuşadası. From 1867 until 1922, Kuşadası was part of Aidin Vilayet.

During the Turkish War of Independence, Kuşadası was occupied from 1919 to 1922, first by Italian troops between 14 May 1919 and 24 May 1922, and then by Greek troops. The Turkish forces led by Mustafa Kemal Atatürk eventually gained control of the city on September 7, 1922.

After the establishment of the Turkish Republic, the Greek population was exchanged for Turks as part of the population exchange between Greece and Turkey in 1923. The Greeks founded new settlements such as Nea Efesos in Greece. Kusadasi remained a district in İzmir Province until its transfer to Aydın Province in 1957.

== Geography ==
The city is situated along a gulf of the same name in the Aegean. The island of Güvercinada (in English: Pigeon Island) is connected to mainland Kuşadası by a causeway, and is situated adjacent to the large hill of Kese Dağı near the center of town.

It is located 95 km (59 mi) south of İzmir, the area's metropolitan centre, and approximately 60–70 km (37–43 mi) in driving distance from the provincial seat of Aydın, depending on the route taken. Its neighbours are Selçuk to the north, Germencik to the north-east, and Söke to the east and south. The Greek island of Samos lies about 16 km offshore.

=== Composition ===
There are 23 neighbourhoods in Kuşadası District:

- Alacamescit
- Bayraklıdede
- Caferli
- Camiatik
- Camikebir
- Çınarköy
- Cumhuriyet
- Dağ
- Davutlar
- Değirmendere
- Ege
- Güzelçamlı
- Hacıfeyfullah
- İkiçeşmelik
- Kadıkalesi
- Kadınlardenizi
- Karaova
- Kirazlı
- Soğucak
- Türkmen
- Yavansu
- Yaylaköy
- Yeniköy

=== Climate ===
Kuşadası has a hot-summer Mediterranean climate (Köppen: Csa), with very hot, dry summers and mild, rainy winters.

Climate data for Kuşadası (1991–2020)
Month	Jan	Feb	Mar	Apr	May	Jun	Jul	Aug	Sep	Oct	Nov	Dec	Year
Mean daily maximum °C (°F)	13.7 (56.7)	14.7 (58.5)	17.3 (63.1)	20.6 (69.1)	24.8 (76.6)	29.4 (84.9)	31.8 (89.2)	31.6 (88.9)	28.2 (82.8)	24.1 (75.4)	19.4 (66.9)	15.1 (59.2)	22.6 (72.7)
Daily mean °C (°F)	9.6 (49.3)	10.4 (50.7)	12.7 (54.9)	15.9 (60.6)	20.0 (68.0)	24.5 (76.1)	26.8 (80.2)	26.7 (80.1)	23.3 (73.9)	19.3 (66.7)	14.7 (58.5)	11.1 (52.0)	18.0 (64.4)
Mean daily minimum °C (°F)	6.1 (43.0)	6.7 (44.1)	8.5 (47.3)	11.6 (52.9)	15.6 (60.1)	19.9 (67.8)	22.1 (71.8)	22.3 (72.1)	18.8 (65.8)	15.0 (59.0)	10.9 (51.6)	7.8 (46.0)	13.8 (56.8)
Average precipitation mm (inches)	117.99 (4.65)	97.02 (3.82)	72.56 (2.86)	44 (1.7)	27.99 (1.10)	5.37 (0.21)	0.85 (0.03)	0.08 (0.00)	21.87 (0.86)	42.86 (1.69)	95.69 (3.77)	115.58 (4.55)	641.86 (25.27)
Average precipitation days (≥ 1.0 mm)	8.8	8	6.8	4.7	3.6	1.4	1.3	1	2.1	3.9	6.2	9.6	57.4
Average relative humidity (%)	63.2	62.8	61.2	61.6	61.7	56.8	55.5	58.8	60.7	64.4	64.2	64.7	61.3
Mean monthly sunshine hours	138.2	145.8	211.0	248.2	310.4	359.2	379.9	359.7	297.4	236.8	168.9	130.6	2,960.5
Source: NOAA

== Demographics ==
The district of Kuşadası had a total resident population of 130,835 in 2022, though the actual population is thought to rise to well over half a million in the summer months due to a significant influx of both domestic and international tourists as well as those visiting family or returning to their summer residence. This also includes the hotel and bar staff, construction workers, and drivers who are required to work in/for the restaurants and other services accommodating these visitors. In addition to tourists from overseas, there is also a substantial community of foreigners that have permanently settled in the area.

== Economy ==
=== Industry ===
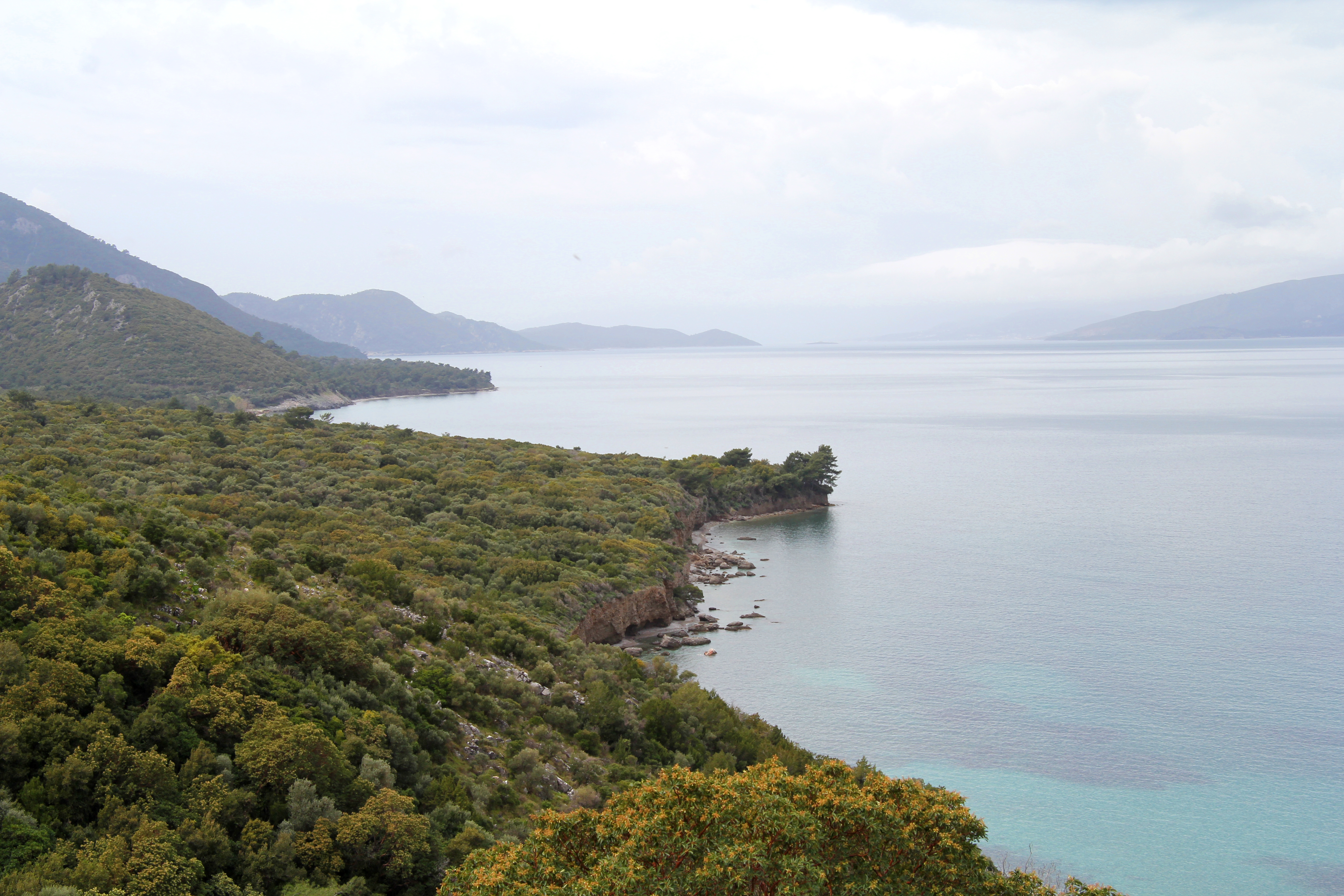
Dilek Peninsula-Büyük Menderes Delta National Park

Kuşadası caters to tourists arriving by land, or from the port for cruise ship passengers heading to Ephesus. In a controversial deal in 2003, the previously public-owned port was leased to a private company and renovated to attract luxury cruise liners.

The area features several well-known local beaches, including Ladies Beach, the beach at the centrum, the beaches between the Batıhan Hotel and the Nazilli Site, the beach at Güzelçamlı, and the Dilek Peninsula-Büyük Menderes Delta National Park beach, referred to by locals as simply Milli Park.

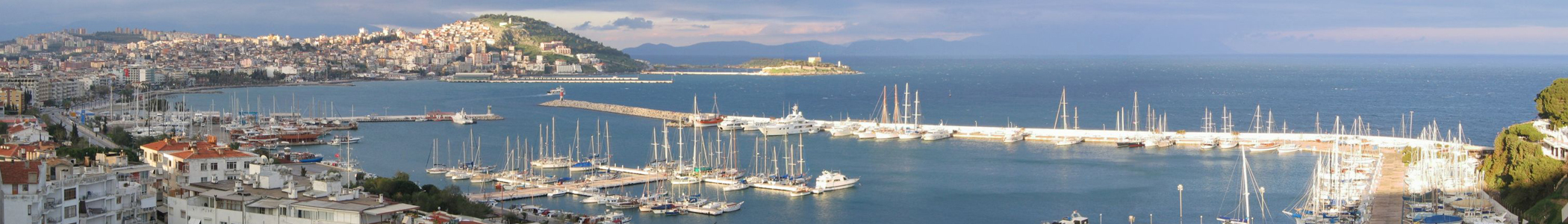
Panoramic view of the town center and port of Kuşadası

== Transportation ==
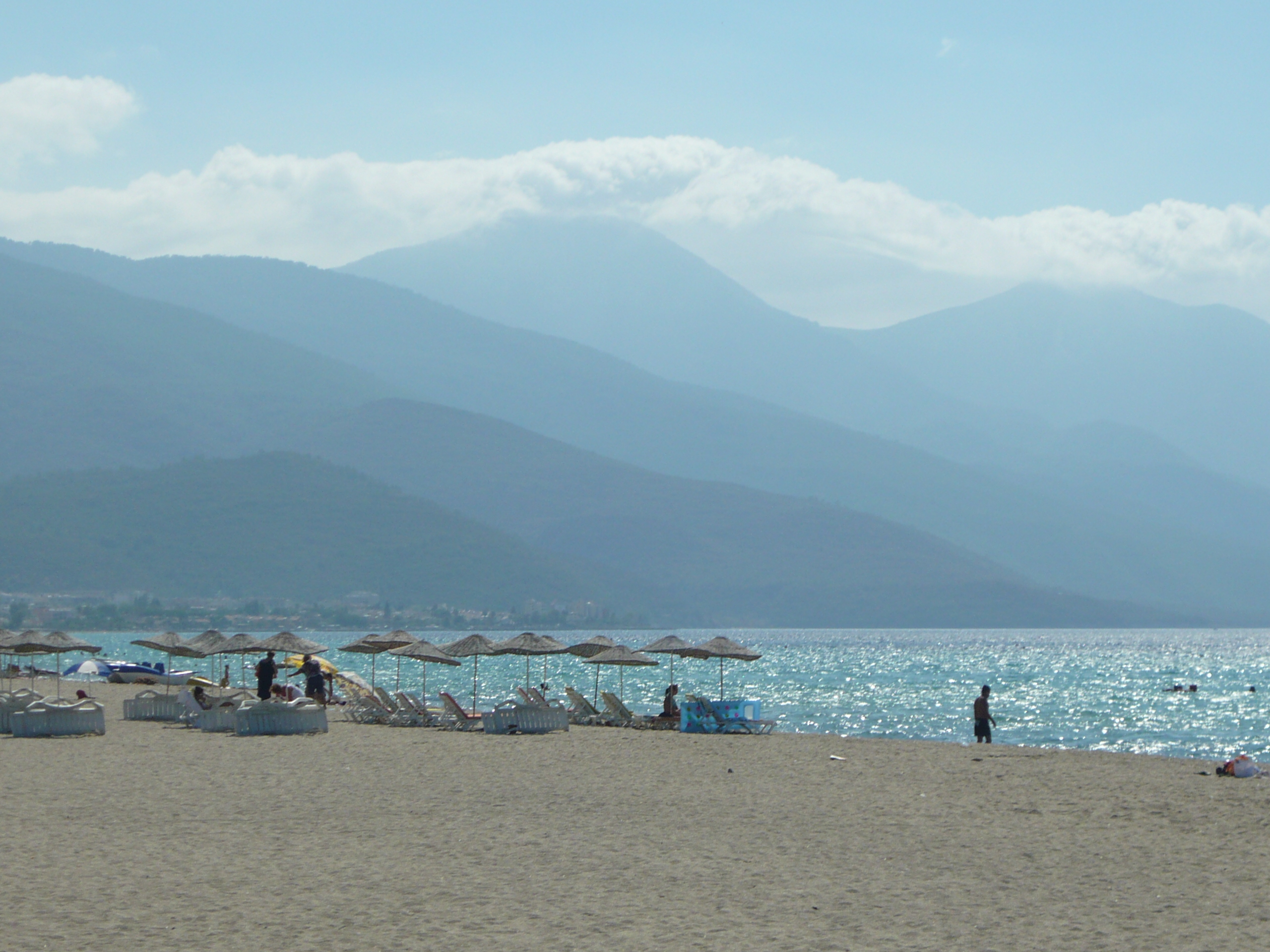
Davutlar Beach near Kuşadası

There is public transport within the town and to nearby locations via shuttle minibuses (dolmuş). There are bus and taxi services going to the nearby airports in İzmir and in Bodrum, Muğla Province. Day trips are available by boat from Kuşadası and Güzelçamlı.

The city is a port of call for several cruise ships.

The port is linked by a six-lane highway to İzmir's Adnan Menderes Airport.

Several state roads connect the city to its surrounding districts, such as Germencik and Aydın.

There are daily ferry services to the nearby Greek island of Samos.

Kuşadası's bus station is a transport hub. Coach buses connect the city to various parts of the country.

== Places of interest ==
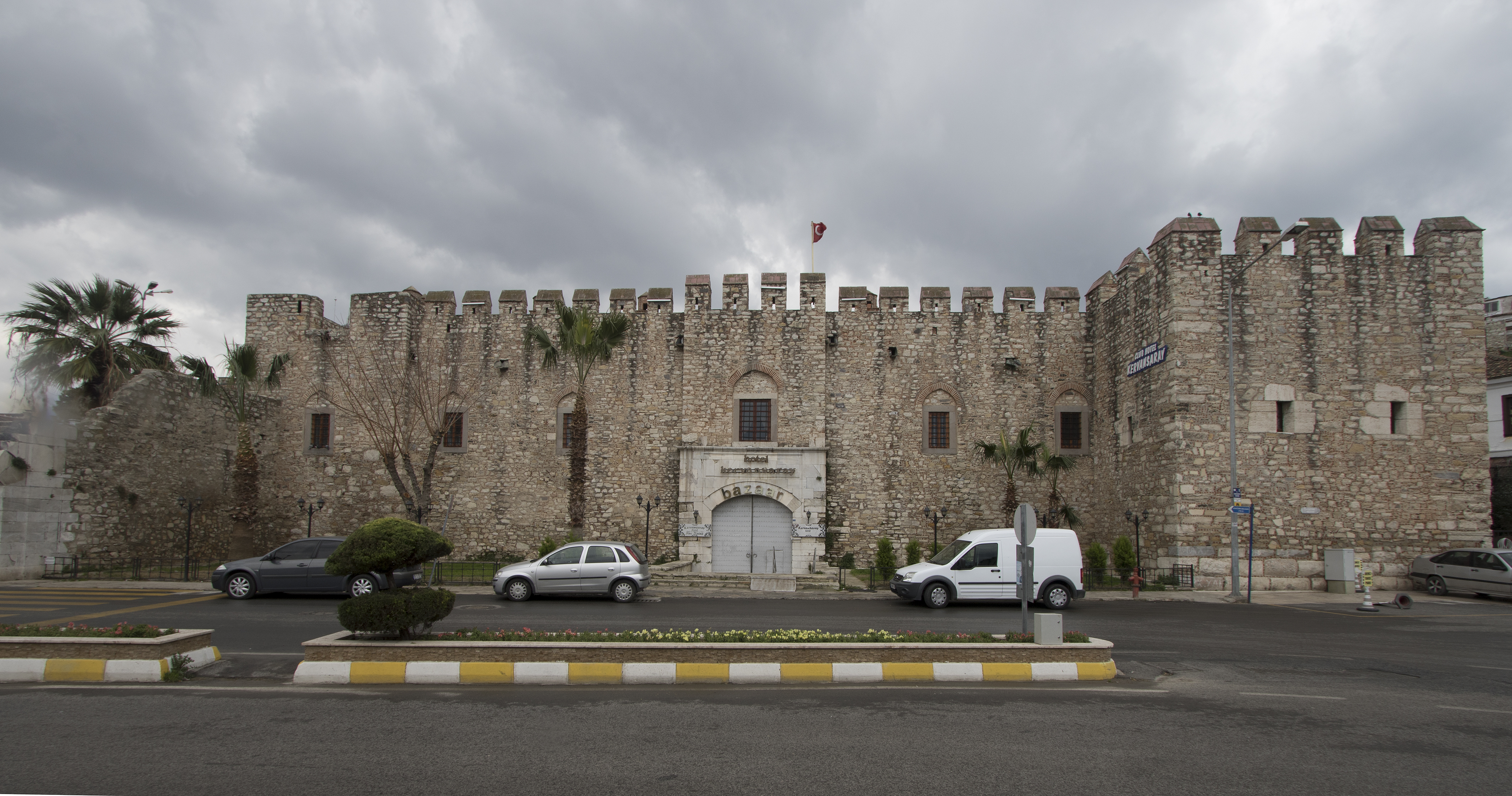
Öküz Mehmed Pasha Caravanserai

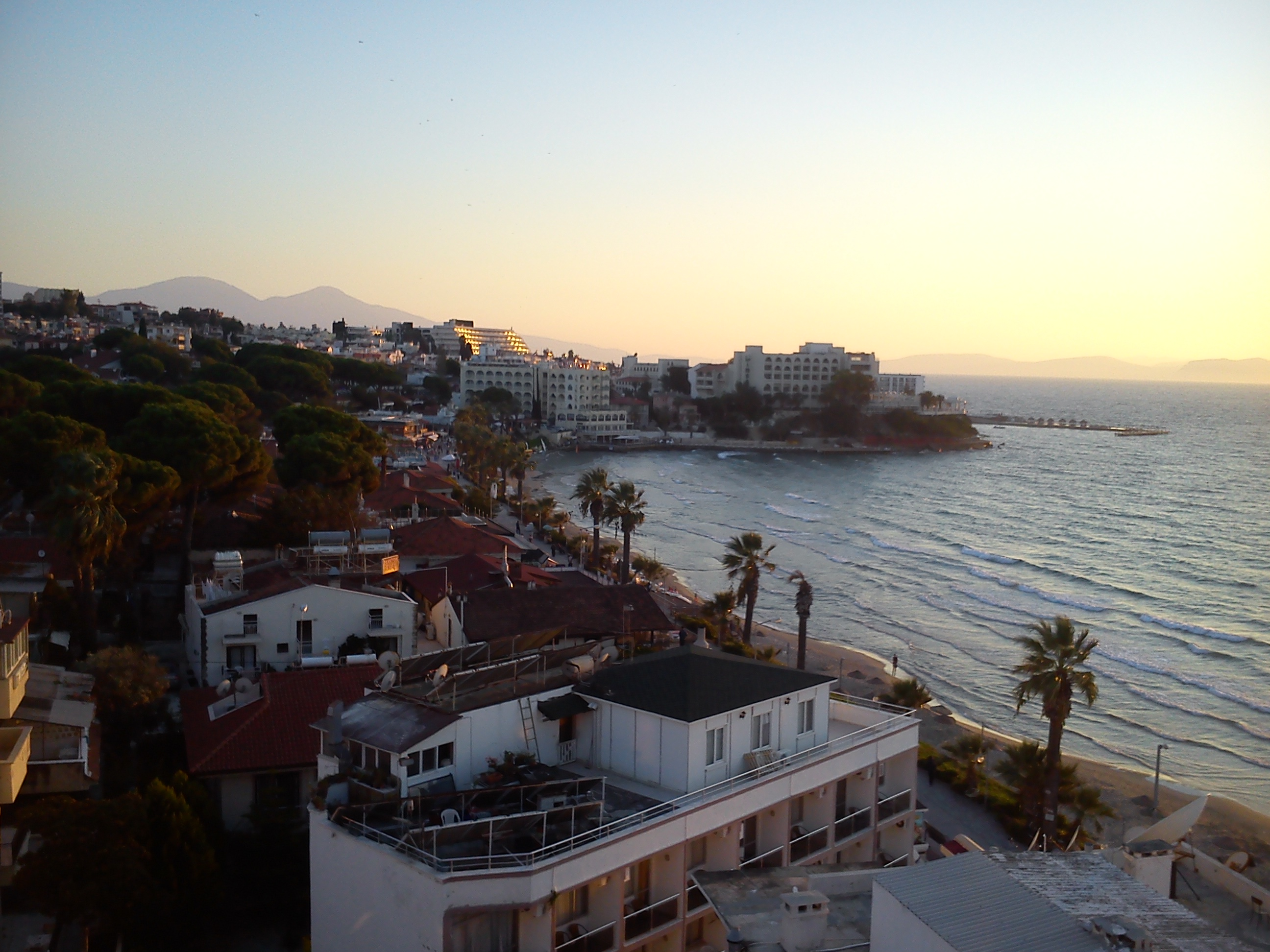
Ladies Beach

- The city walls – There were once three gates; one remains.
- Kaleiçi Mosque – Built in 1618 by Grand Vizier Öküz Kara Mehmed Pasha.
- The Öküz Mehmed Pasha Caravanserai is near the docks. It was built in 1618 as a strong-room for the goods of seamen.
- Güvercin Adası ("Pigeon Island" in English) – The peninsula/island at the end of the bay, which has a castle and swimming beaches, including a private beach and cafe with a view back across the bay to the harbour of Kuşadası. Public beaches are located at the back of the peninsula, towards the open sea.
- Kirazli – Traditional Turkish village 12 kilometres (7.5 mi) from Kuşadası.
- Yılancı Burnu – A second peninsula beyond Güvercin Ada. Possibly the location of the original settlement of Neopolis. Some walls are visible. There are beaches and beach clubs here.
- Several aqua-parks with wave-pools and white-water slides are located near the town.
- Ladies Beach – Very close to the town center, one of the primary tourist attractions.
- Kadıkalesi – Venetian/Byzantine castle, 10 kilometres (6.2 mi) along the Kuşadası-Davutlar road.
- Panionium – 25 km (16 mi) south of Kuşadası, situated along the Davutlar-Güzelçamlı road. Once the central meeting place of the Ionian League. The ruins are in poor condition and their authenticity is disputed.
- Dilek Peninsula-Büyük Menderes Delta National Park – About 30 kilometres (19 mi) south of the city centre, the national park is adjacent to the town of Güzelçamlı. It has several coves, beaches, canyons, and a sink cave. It is one of the most diverse and protected national parks in Turkey.

== Culture ==
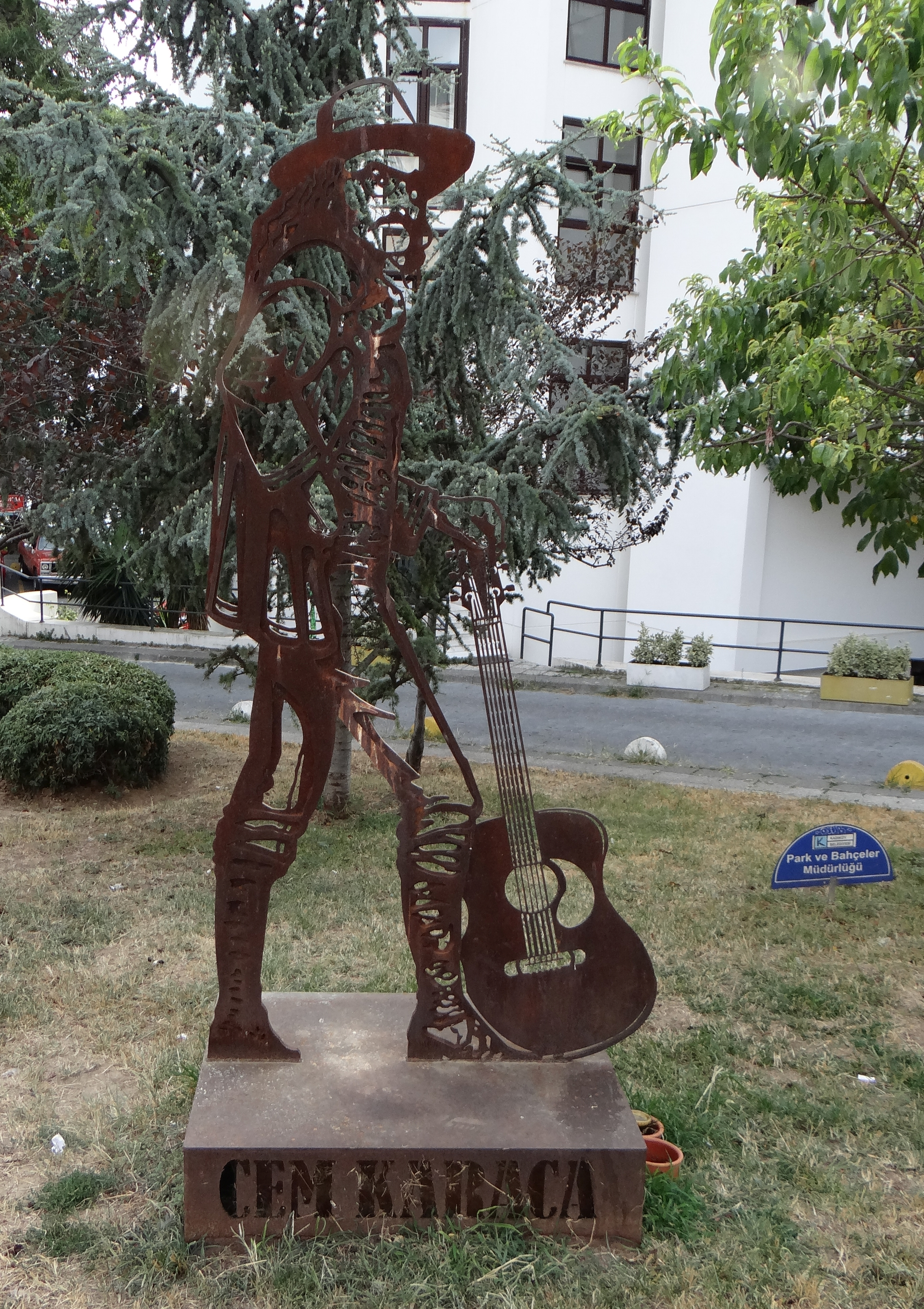
Statue of Cem Karaca

- An annual song contest has been held here. It was once won by Cem Karaca.
- The annual Fanta Gençlik Festivali (Fanta Youth Festival), hosted by the Turkish franchise of Fanta (see International availability of Fanta), travels across the country on specific dates, holding concerts at each location. On July 17, 2010, the festival hosted one of the concerts of this festival in Kuşadası.
- The Kuşadası Gençlik Festivali (Kuşadası Youth Festival, not to be confused with the above) has been hosted annually since 2016 at Sevgi Plajı (Love Beach), one of the main beaches situated on the coast of the district's Davutlar locality – roughly a 17 km (11 mi) drive south from central Kuşadası, serviced regularly by dolmuş departing from the city. Facilitated each year in July over the course of five days with a total of over 30 artists performing, the festival saw an estimated turnout of about 90,000 people in its 2017 iteration according to its promoters. Since its inception, it has continuously grown in popularity and has become among the most regarded music festivals in Turkey.

== Sports ==
The football teams of the local sports clubs Kuşadasıspor, who compete in the TFF 3. Lig, and Kuşadası Yıldız Fenerspor, who compete in the Turkish Regional Amateur League, play their home matches in the Özer Türk Stadium.

== International relations ==
Kuşadası is twinned with:

- Ludbreg, Croatia
- Bihać, Bosnia and Herzegovina
- Cherkasy, Ukraine
- Uzhhorod, Ukraine
- (Northern Cyprus) Kyrenia, Cyprus
- Marl, Germany
- Zenica, Bosnia and Herzegovina
- Târgu Mureș, Romania
- Monterey, United States
- Prizren, Kosovo
- Sinaia, Romania
- Vathy, Greece

== See also ==
- Blue Cruise
- Foreign purchases of real estate in Turkey
- Güzelçamlı
- Marinas in Turkey
- Turkish Riviera
