= List of populated places in Denizli Province =

Places in Turkey

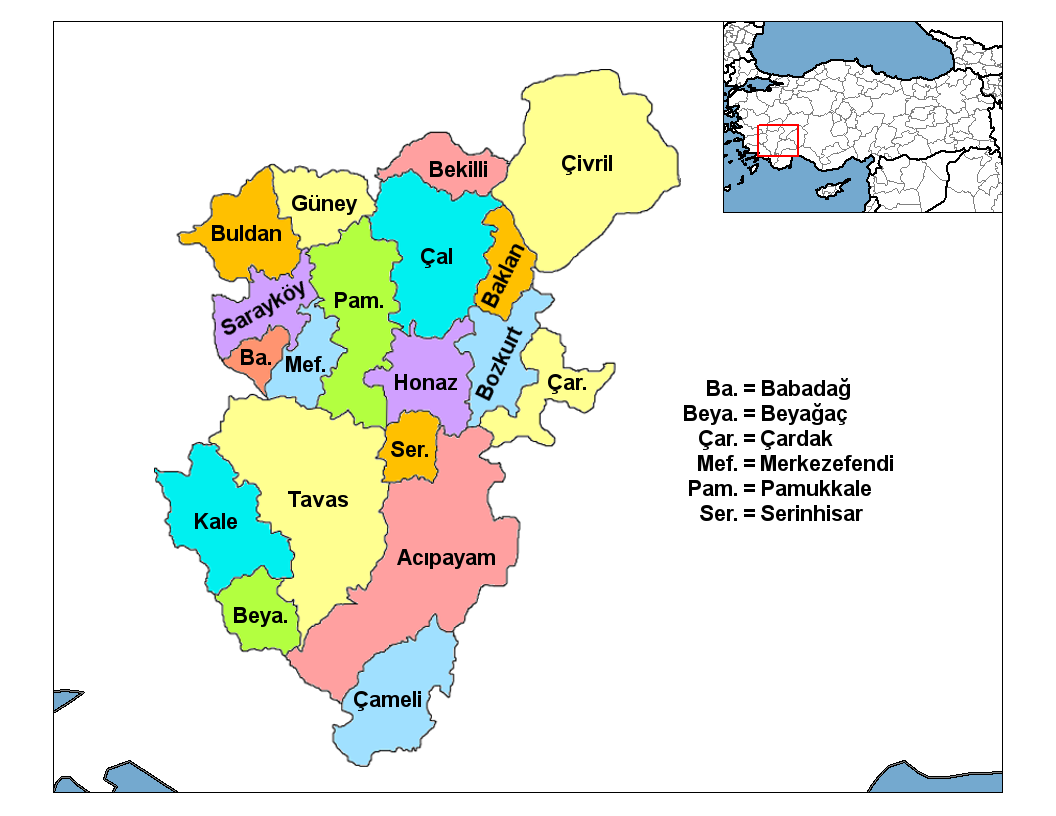
Denizli Province

Below is the list of populated places in Denizli Province, Turkey by the districts.

== Acıpayam ==
Acıpayam

- Akalan
- Akşar
- Alaattin
- Alcı
- Aliveren
- Apa
- Aşağı
- Avşar
- Bademli
- Bedirbey
- Benlik
- Boğazdere
- Çakır
- Çamlık
- Çiftlikköy
- Corum
- Çubukçular
- Darıveren
- Dedebağı
- Dodurgalar
- Eskiköy
- Gedikli
- Gölcük
- Gümüş
- Güney
- Hacıkurtlar
- Hisar
- Karahüyük
- Karaismailler
- Kelekçi
- Kırca
- Köke
- Kumavşarı
- Kurtlar
- Kuyucak
- Kuzören
- Mevlütler
- Oğuzköy
- Olukbaşı
- Ören
- Ovayurt
- Pınarbaşı
- Pınaryazı
- Sandalcık
- Sırçalık
- Suçatı
- Uçarı
- Yassıhüyük
- Yazır
- Yeni
- Yeniköy
- Yeşildere
- Yeşilyuva
- Yolçatı
- Yukarı
- Yumrutaş

== Babadağ ==
Babadağ

- Ahıllı
- Bekirler
- Cumhuriyet
- Demirli
- Gazi
- Gündoğdu
- İncirpınar
- Kelleci
- Kıranyer
- Mollaahmetler
- Oğuzlar
- Yeniköy

== Baklan ==
Baklan

- Balca
- Beyelli
- Boğaziçi
- Çataloba
- Dağal
- Gökpınar
- Gürlük
- Hadim
- Hüsamettindede
- İcikli
- Kavaklar
- Kirazlı
- Konak
- Şenyayla

== Bekilli ==
Bekilli

- Bahçeli
- Bükrüce
- Çamköy
- Çoğaşlı
- Deşdemir
- Gömce
- İkizbaba
- Köselli
- Kutlubey
- Poyrazlı
- Sırıklı
- Üçkuyu
- Yahyalar
- Yeni
- Yeşiloba

== Beyağaç ==
Beyağaç

- Çamlık
- Cumhuriyet
- Eşenler
- Fatih
- Geriçam
- Hürriyet
- Kapuz
- Kızılcaağaç
- Pınarönü
- Sazak
- Subaşı
- Uzunoluk
- Yeniçeşme
- Yenimahalle
- Zafer

== Bozkurt ==
Bozkurt

- Alikurt
- Armutalanı
- Avdan
- Baklankuyucak
- Barbaros
- Başçeşme
- Çambaşı
- Cumalı
- Fatih
- Hamidiye
- Hayrettinköy
- İnceler
- İncelertekkesi
- Mahmudiye
- Mecidiye
- Mehmetcik
- Mimar Sinan
- Sazköy
- Tutluca
- Yenibağlar

== Buldan ==
Buldan

- 4 Eylül
- Aktaş
- Alacaoğlu
- Alandız
- Beyler
- Boğazçiftlik
- Bölmekaya
- Bostanyeri
- Bozalan
- Bursa
- Çamköy
- Çarşı
- Çatak
- Çaybaşı
- Cumhuriyet
- Derbent
- Dımbazlar
- Doğan
- Düzalan
- Girne
- Gölbaşı
- Gülalan
- Güroluk
- Hasanbeyler
- Helvacılar
- Kadıköy
- Karaköy
- Karşıyaka
- Kaşıkçı
- Kırandamı
- Kovanoluk
- Kurtuluş
- Kurudere
- Mahmutlu
- Oğuz
- Sarımahmutlu
- Süleymanlı
- Turan
- Türlübey
- Yalçınkaya
- Yayla
- Yeni
- Yeniçam
- Yenicekent
- Yeşildere

== Çal ==
Çal

- Akkent
- Alfaklar
- Aşağıseyit
- Bahadırlar
- Baklançakırlar
- Bayıralan
- Belevi
- Çalçakırlar
- Çalkuyucak
- Dağmarmara
- Dayılar
- Denizler
- Develler
- Gelinören
- Hançalar
- Hüseyinler
- İsabey
- İsmailler
- Kabalar
- Kaplanlar
- Karakaya
- Karapınar
- Kocaköy
- Mahmutgazi
- Ortaköy
- Peynirciler
- Sakızcılar
- Şapçılar
- Sazak
- Selcen
- Süller
- Yazır
- Yeşilyurt
- Yukarıseyit

== Çameli ==
Çameli

- Akpınar
- Arıkaya
- Ayvacık
- Belevi
- Bıçakçı
- Çamlıbel
- Cevizli
- Çiğdemli
- Cumaalanı
- Elmalı
- Emecik
- Ericek
- Gökçeyaka
- Gürsu
- Güzelyurt
- İmamlar
- Kalınkoz
- Karabayır
- Kınıkyeri
- Kirazlıyayla
- Kızılyaka
- Kocaova
- Kolak
- Sarıkavak
- Sofular
- Taşçılar
- Yaylapınar
- Yeni
- Yeşilyayla
- Yumrutaş
- Yunuspınarı

== Çardak ==
Çardak

- Ayvaz
- Bahçelievler
- Beylerli
- Çaltı
- Çınar
- Cumhuriyet
- Gemişli
- Gemişpınarı
- Gölcük
- Hayriye
- Hürriyet
- İstiklal
- Saray
- Söğütlü
- Söğütözü

== Çivril ==
Çivril

- Akçaköy
- Akpınar
- Aktaş
- Aşağı
- Balçıkhisar
- Bayat
- Bekirli
- Belence
- Beydilli
- Beyköy
- Bozdağ
- Bucak
- Bulgurlar
- Caber
- Çağlayan
- Çakallar
- Çandır
- Çapak
- Çarşı
- Çatlar
- Çayır
- Çetinler
- Çıtak
- Cumalar
- Düzbel
- Emircik
- Gökgöl
- Gümüşsu
- Gürpınar
- Hamam
- Haydan
- İğdir
- İmrallı
- İnceköy
- Irgıllı
- İshaklı
- Işıklı
- Karabedirler
- Karahacılı
- Karalar
- Karamanlı
- Karayahşılar
- Kavakalanı
- Kavakköy
- Kıralan
- Kızılcasöğüt
- Kızılcayar
- Koçak
- Kocayaka
- Menteş
- Ömerli
- Osmanköy
- Özdemirci
- Reşadiye
- Saray
- Sarıbeyli
- Sarılar
- Savran
- Şehitler
- Şenköy
- Seraserli
- Sökmen
- Somak
- Stadyum
- Sundurlu
- Süngülü
- Tekkeköy
- Tokça
- Tuğlu
- Yahyalı
- Yakacık
- Yalınlı
- Yamanlar
- Yassıhüyük
- Yukarı
- Yukarıçapak
- Yuvaköy

== Güney ==
Güney

- Adıgüzeller
- Aşağıçeşme
- Aydoğdu
- Çamrak
- Cindere
- Çorbacılar
- Doğanlı
- Ertuğrul
- Eziler
- Fatih
- Hamidiye
- Haylamaz
- Karaağaçlı
- Karagözler
- Kerimler
- Koparan
- Orta
- Ortaçeşme
- Parmaksızlar
- Tilkilik
- Üçeylül
- Yağcılar
- Yeni
- Yenikonak

== Honaz ==
Honaz

- Afşinbey
- Akbaş
- Aşağıdağdere
- Aydınlar
- Cumhuriyet
- Dereçiftlik
- Emirazizli
- Gürleyik
- Haydar
- Hisar
- Hürriyet
- Kaklık
- Karaçay
- Karateke
- Kızılyer
- Kocabaş
- Menteşe
- Ovacık
- Sapaca
- Yeni
- Yokuşbaşı
- Yukarıdağdere

== Kale ==
Kale

- Adamharmanı
- Alanyurt
- Belenköy
- Çakırbağ
- Çamlarca
- Cevherpaşa
- Cumhuriyet
- Demirciler
- Doğanköy
- Esenkaya
- Gökçeören
- Gölbaşı
- Gülbağlık
- Habipler
- Hürriyet
- İnceğiz
- Karaköy
- Karayayla
- Kayabaşı
- Kırköy
- Koçarboğazı
- Köprübaşı
- Künar
- Muslugüme
- Narlı
- Ortaköy
- Ortatepe
- Özlüce
- Toki
- Uluçam
- Yenidere
- Yeniköy

== Merkezefendi ==
Merkezefendi

- 1200 Evler
- Adalet
- Akçeşme
- Akkonak
- Alpaslan
- Altındere
- Altıntop
- Aşağışamlı
- Bahçelievler
- Barbaros
- Barutçular
- Başkarcı
- Bereketler
- Bozburun
- Çakmak
- Çeltikçi
- Değirmenönü
- Eskihisar
- Gerzele
- Göveçlik
- Gültepe
- Gümüşçay
- Hacıeyüplü
- Hallaçlar
- Hisar
- İlbade
- Kadılar
- Karahasanlı
- Karaman
- Kayalar
- Kumkısık
- Mehmet Akif Ersoy
- Merkezefendi
- Muratdede
- Salihağa
- Saraylar
- Saruhan
- Selçuk Bey
- Şemikler
- Servergazi
- Sevindik
- Sırakapılar
- Şirinköy
- Sümer
- Üzerlik
- Yeni
- Yenişafak
- Yenişehir
- Yeşilyayla
- Zafer

== Pamukkale ==
Pamukkale

- 15 Mayıs
- Akçapınar
- Akdere
- Akhan
- Akköy
- Aktepe
- Anafartalar
- Asmalıevler
- Atalar
- Bağbaşı
- Belenardıç
- Cankurtaran
- Çeşmebaşı
- Cumhuriyet
- Deliktaş
- Develi
- Dokuzkavaklar
- Eldenizli
- Eymir
- Fatih
- Fesleğen
- Gökpınar
- Gölemezli
- Goncalı
- Gözler
- Güzelköy
- Güzelpınar
- Haytabey
- Hürriyet
- İncilipınar
- Irlaganlı
- İstiklal
- Kale
- Kaplanlar
- Karahayıt
- Karakova
- Karakurt
- Karataş
- Karşıyaka
- Kavakbaşı
- Kayıhan
- Kervansaray
- Kınıklı
- Kocadere
- Korucuk
- Küçükdere
- Kurtluca
- Kuşpınar
- Mehmetcik
- Pamukkale
- Pelitlibağ
- Pınarkent
- Siteler
- Tekke
- Topraklık
- Uzunpınar
- Yeniköy
- Yukarışamlı
- Yunus Emre
- Zeytinköy
- Zümrüt

== Sarayköy ==
Sarayköy

- Acıdere
- Acısu
- Adaköy
- Ahmetli
- Altıntepe
- Aşağı
- Atatürk
- Bala
- Beylerbeyi
- Caber
- Cumhuriyet
- Duacılı
- Gerali
- Hasköy
- Hisarköy
- Kabaağaç
- Karakıran
- Karataş
- Köprübaşı
- Kumluca
- Sakarya
- Sazak
- Sığma
- Tekke
- Tepeköy
- Tırkaz
- Tosunlar
- Trafo
- Turan
- Uyanık
- Yakayurt
- Yeşilyurt

== Serinhisar ==
Serinhisar

- Aşağı
- Ayaz
- Cumhuriyet
- Kaya
- Kocapınar
- Orta
- Pınarcık
- Şair Eşref
- Yatağan
- Yenice
- Yüreğil

== Tavas ==
Tavas

- Akıncılar
- Akyar
- Alpa
- Altınova
- Avdan
- Aydoğdu
- Baharlar
- Bahçeköy
- Balkıca
- Çağırgan
- Çalıköy
- Çiftlikköy
- Damlacık
- Denizoluğu
- Dereağzı
- Derinkuyu
- Ebecik
- Garipköy
- Gökçeler
- Gümüşdere
- Güzelköy
- Hırka
- Horasanlı
- Karahisar
- Kayaca
- Kayapınar
- Keçeliler
- Kızılca
- Kızılcabölük
- Kozlar
- Medet
- Nikfer
- Orta
- Ovacık
- Pınarlar
- Pınarlık
- Samanlık
- Sarıabat
- Seki
- Sofular
- Solmaz
- Tekkeköy
- Ulukent
- Vakıf
- Yahşiler
- Yaka
- Yeni
- Yeşilköy
- Yorga
- Yukarıboğaz
