= Ömerli =

Ömerli is a Turkish place name and may refer to the following places:

- Ömerli, Bandırma, a village
- Ömerli, Çivril
- Ömerli, Ilgaz
- Ömerli, İznik
- Ömerli, Karaisalı, a village in Karaisalı district of Adana Province, Turkey
- Ömerli, Kastamonu, a village in Kastamonu district of Kastamonu Province, Turkey
- Ömerli, Mardin, a district and municipality of Mardin Province, Turkey
- Ömerli, Pozantı, a village in Pozantı district of Adana Province, Turkey
- Ömerli, Halfeti, a village in Halfeti district of Şanlıurfa Province, Turkey
- Ömerli Dam, a dam in Istanbul Province, Turkey
- The Turkish name of Galini, Cyprus, a town in northern Cyprus
