= Sütlaç–Çivril railway =

Çivril branch
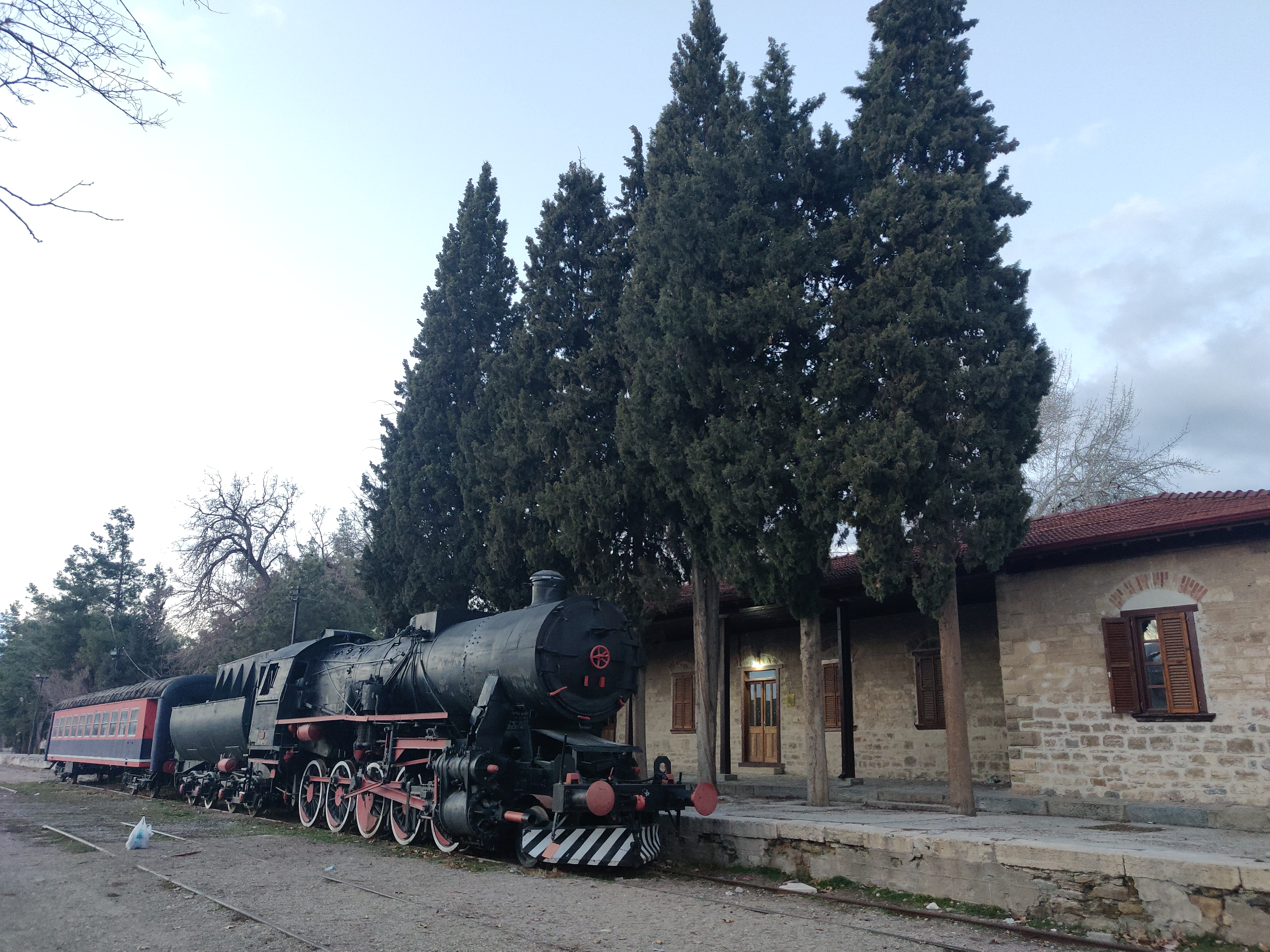
- Çivril railway station

Overview
- Status: Closed
- Locale: Northeast Denizli province
- Termini: Sütlaç; Çivril
- Stations: 2

Service
- Type: Heavy rail

History
- Opened: 1889
- Closed: 1988

Technical
- Line length: 30 km (19 mi)
- Track gauge: 1,435 mm (4 ft 8 1/2 in) standard gauge
- Highest elevation: 830 m (2,720 ft)

The Çivril branch was a branch of the Turkish State Railways. It was built in 1889 by the Oriental Railway Company to service Çivril, which was only 30 km (19 mi) north of their mainline. Due to low ridership and virtually no freight traffic, the line was abandoned in 1988. The route is across the relatively flat Çivril plain and passes by Lake Işıklı.
