= Caber =

Caber can refer to:

- Caber toss, a sport

== Places ==
- Caber, Çivril, a village in Çivril District, Denizli Province, Turkey
- Caber, Sarayköy, a village in Sarayköy District, Denizli Province, Turkey
- Çabër, a village in Zubin Potok, Mitrovica district, Kosovo

== Other uses ==
- CaBER, Capillary Breakup Extensional Rheometer
- Caber (comics), a deity in Marvel Comics
- Caber Music, a British record label founded in 1998 by Tom Bancroft

== See also ==
- Kaber (disambiguation)
