= Bozdag (disambiguation) =

Bozdag means "gray mountain" in Turkish and it may refer to

- Bozdağ, a town in Ödemiş, İzmir Province, Turkey
- Bozdağ, Çivril
- Mount Bozdağ, a mountain near Mingachevir, Azerbaijan
- Falakro, a mountain in Drama prefecture, Greece

== People with the surname ==
- Bekir Bozdağ, Turkish politician
- Ebru Bozdağ, Turkish seismologist
