= Çakallar =

Çakallar can refer to the following villages in Turkey:

- Çakallar, Alanya
- Çakallar, Balya
- Çakallar, Çivril
