= Yatagan (disambiguation) =

A yatagan is a Turkish sword.

Yatagan also may refer to:

- T-84 Yatagan, a Ukrainian tank
- Turkish towns:
  - Yatağan, Muğla
  - Yatağan, Denizli, in Serinhisar district
- Yatağan Plateau in Denizli Province, Turkey
- Yatağan power station, a coal-fired power station in Yatağan, Turkey
- yatagan, a musical instrument (Russian: ятаган) in use among Turkic peoples, compare yatga
- Yatagan (2020 Bulgarian film), see Cinema of Bulgaria

== People ==
- Mehmet Ali Yatağan (born 1993), Turkish basketball player
- Sergen Yatağan (born 1999), Turkish footballer
