= İshaklı =

İshaklı can refer to:

- İshaklı, Alanya
- İshaklı, Bayat
- İshaklı, Çivril
