= Beyköy =

Beyköy is a Turkish place name and may refer to:

- Beyköy, a village in the Lefkoşa district of Northern Cyprus
- Beyköy, Düzce, a town in the district of Düzce, Düzce Province, Turkey
- Beyköy, Emirdağ, a village in the district of Emirdağ, Afyonkarahisar Province, Turkey
- Beyköy, İhsaniye, a village in the district of İhsaniye, Afyon Province, Turkey
- Beyköy, İncirliova, a village in the district of İncirliova, Aydın Province, Turkey
- Beyköy, Köşk, a village in the district of Köşk, Aydın Province, Turkey
- Beyköy, Bandırma, a village in the district of Bandırma, Balıkesir Province, Turkey
- Beyköy, Çivril
- Beyköy, Ilgaz
- Beyköy, Keşan
- Beyköy, Savaştepe, a village
- Beyköy, Susurluk, a village
- Beyköy, Taşköprü, a village
- Beyköy, Yeşilova

== See also ==
- Beyköyü, Karataş, a village in Karataş district of Adana Province, Turkey
