= Gökgöl =

Gökgöl can refer to:

- Gökgöl Cave
- Gökgöl, Çivril
