= Sarılar =

Sarılar may refer to several places:

== Iran ==
- Sarilar, Ardabil, Iran
- Sarilar, East Azerbaijan, Iran

== Turkey ==
- Sarılar, Amasya a village in Amasya central district of Amasya Province
- Sarılar, Çivril a village in Çivril district of Denizli Province
- Sarılar, Elmalı a village in Elmalı district of Antalya Province
- Sarılar, Göynük, a village in Göynük district of Bolu Province
- Sarılar, Kazan, a village in Kazan district of Ankara Province
- Sarılar, Kaş, a village and neighborhood in Kaş district of Antalya Province
- Sarılar, Kemalpaşa, a village in Kemalpaşa district of İzmir Province
- Sarılar, Manavgat, a village in Manavgat district of Antalya Province
- Sarılar, Mersin, a village in Mezitli district of Mersin Province
- Sarılar, Şehitkamil a village in Şehitkamil district of Gaziantep Province
- Sarılar, Sur
