= Cumalar =

Cumalar can refer to:

- Cumalar, Barda
- Cumalar, Çivril
- Cumalar, Karpuzlu
