= Bekirli =

Bekirli may refer to:

- Bekirli, Biga, a village in Biga district of Çanakkale Province, Turkey
- Bekirli, Çivril
- Bekirli, Karaisalı, a village in Karaisalı district, Adana Province, Turkey
- Bekirli, Perşembe, a village in Perşembe district of Ordu Province, Turkey
- Bekirli, Taşköprü, a village
