= Menteş =

Menteş can refer to:

- Menteş, Çivril
- Menteş, Sandıklı
