= Üçkuyu =

Üçkuyu can refer to:

- Üçkuyu, Bekilli
- Üçkuyu, Kulp
- Üçkuyu, Sultandağı
