= Uzunoluk =

Uzunoluk can refer to:

- Uzunoluk, Beyağaç
- Uzunoluk, Kastamonu
