= Koçak =

Koçak ([ˈkotʃak]) may refer to:

People

- Abdülkadir Koçak (born 1981), Turkish boxer
- Adem Koçak (born 1983), Turkish footballer
- Celaleddin Koçak (born 1977), Turkish footballer
- Cenk Koçak (born 1996), Turkish classic powerlifter
- Dilek Koçak (born 2005), Turkish female middle distance runner
- Ekrem Koçak (1931–1993), Turkish distance runner
- Ferat Koçak (born 1979), German politician
- Matej Kocak (1882–1918), United States Marine Corps sergeant

Places

- Koçak, Çivril
- Koçak, Köşk, a village in the District of Köşk, Aydın Province, Turkey.
- Koçak, Gercüş, a village in the District of Gercüş, Batman Province, Turkey
