= Kavakköy (disambiguation) =

Kavakköy can refer to:

- Kavakköy
- Kavakköy, Bayramören
- Kavakköy, Çivril
- Kavakköy, Dursunbey
- Kavakköy, Kovancılar
- Kavakköy, Sivrice
