= Esenler (disambiguation) =

Esenler can refer to:

- Esenler
- Eşenler, Beyağaç
- Esenler, Kastamonu
- Esenler, Tarsus
- Esenler, Yüreğir
- Esenler Coach Terminal
