= Şenköy (disambiguation) =

Şenköy can refer to:

- Şenköy
- Şenköy, Arhavi
- Şenköy, Çivril
- Şenköy, Dursunbey
- Şenköy, İspir
- Şenköy, the Turkish name for Sâniob, Romania
