= Kavakalanı =

Kavakalanı can refer to:

- Kavakalanı, Balya
- Kavakalanı, Çivril
