= Kızılcaağaç =

Kızılcaağaç can refer to:

- Kızılcaağaç, Beyağaç
- Kızılcaağaç, Bucak
