= Tuğlu =

Tuğlu can refer to:

- Tuğlu, Çivril
- Tuğlu, Kahta
- Tuğlu, Kemaliye
- Tuğlu, Sungurlu
