= Süngülü =

Süngülü can refer to:

- Süngülü, Çivril
- Süngülü, Posof
