= Karahacılı =

Karahacılı is a Turkish place name and may refer to the following places in Turkey:

- Karahacılı, Çivril
- Karahacılı, Dinar, a village in Dinar district of Afyonkarahisar Province
- Karahacılı, Mersin, a village in Yenişehir district of Mersin Province
- Karahacılı, Silifke, a village in Silifke district of Mersin Province
