= İmrallı =

İmrallı can refer to:

- İmrallı, Bayat
- İmrallı, Çivril
