= Pınarönü =

Pınarönü can refer to:

- Pınarönü, Beyağaç
- Pınarönü, Devrek
- Pınarönü, Erzincan
