= Yassıhüyük =

Yassıhüyük can refer to:

- Yassıhüyük, Acıpayam
- Yassıhüyük, Çivril
- Yassıhüyük, Polatlı
