= Savran =

Savran may refer to:

- Savran Raion, a former district of Odesa Oblast, Ukraine
  - Savran, Odesa Oblast, an urban-type settlement in the district
- Savran River, a river in Ukraine, tributary of Southern Bug
- Savran (Hasidic dynasty), from Savran, Ukraine
- Šavrane, a village in the municipality of Kruševac, Serbia
- Savran, Çivril
- Savran, Gölbaşı, a village in the district of Gölbaşı, Adıyaman Province, Turkey
- Savran, Sinanpaşa, a village in the district of Sinanpaşa, Afyonkarahisar Province, Turkey

== See also ==
- Savrandere, Aydın, a village in the district of Aydın, Aydın Province, Turkey
- Sawran (disambiguation)
