= Belence =

Belence can refer to:

- Belence, Çivril
- the Hungarian name for Belinț in Romania
