= Yuvaköy =

Yuvaköy can refer to:

- Yuvaköy, Amasya
- Yuvaköy, Çivril
