= Akçaköy =

Akçaköy can refer to the following villages in Turkey:

- Akçaköy, Alaca
- Akçaköy, Çivril
- Akçaköy, Kepsut
- Akçaköy, Köşk
- Akçaköy, Yeşilova
