= Tutluca =

Tutluca can refer to:

- Tutluca, Alaca
- Tutluca, Bozkurt
