= Hayrettinköy =

Hayrettinköy can refer to:

- Hayrettinköy, Bozkurt
- Hayrettinköy, Merzifon
