= Osmanköy =

Osmanköy can refer to the following villages in Turkey:

- Osmanköy, Çivril
- Osmanköy, İhsaniye
- Osmanköy, İvrindi
- Osmanköy, Nallıhan
