= Emirhisar =

Emirhisar can refer to:

- Emirhisar, Çivril
- Emirhisar, Sandıklı
