= Yamanlar (disambiguation) =

Yamanlar can refer to:

- Yamanlar, a mountain in Turkey
- Yamanlar, Çivril
- Yamanlar, Hınıs
- Yamanlar, Pınarbaşı, a village
- Yamanlar, Yeniçağa, a village
