= Lake Eşen =

- Eşen Pond
- Eşen Göleti (Turkish)
- Location within Turkey
- Location: Turkey
- Coordinates: 37°12′08″N 29°01′03″E
- Type: lake
- Surface area: 75 hectares (190 acres)
- Surface elevation: 850 metres (2,790 ft)

Lake Eşen or Eşen Pond (Turkish: Eşen Göleti) is a lake in Turkey.

It is located at 37°12′08″N 29°01′03″E between Beyağaç and Tavas ilçes (districts) of Denizli Province. Its altitude is 850 metres (2,790 ft) and its surface area is 75 hectares (190 acres). It is surrounded by red pine forests. In 1995, together with surrounding 231.5 hectares (572 acres) area it was declared a picnic area. The main fish of the lake is carp.
