= Yenimahalle, Beyağaç =

Village in Turkey

Yenimahalle
- Neighbourhood
- Country: Turkey
- Province: Denizli
- District: Beyağaç
- Population (2024): 566
- Time zone: UTC+3 (TRT)

Yenimahalle is a neighbourhood of the municipality and district of Beyağaç, Denizli Province, Turkey. Its population is 566 (2024).
