= Balçıkhisar, Çivril =

Village in Turkey

Balçıkhisar
- Neighbourhood
- Country: Turkey
- Province: Denizli
- District: Çivril
- Population (2024): 879
- Time zone: UTC+3 (TRT)

Balçıkhisar is a neighbourhood of the municipality and district of Çivril, Denizli Province, Turkey. Its population is 879 (2024).
