= Lake Işıklı =

Lake in Turkey

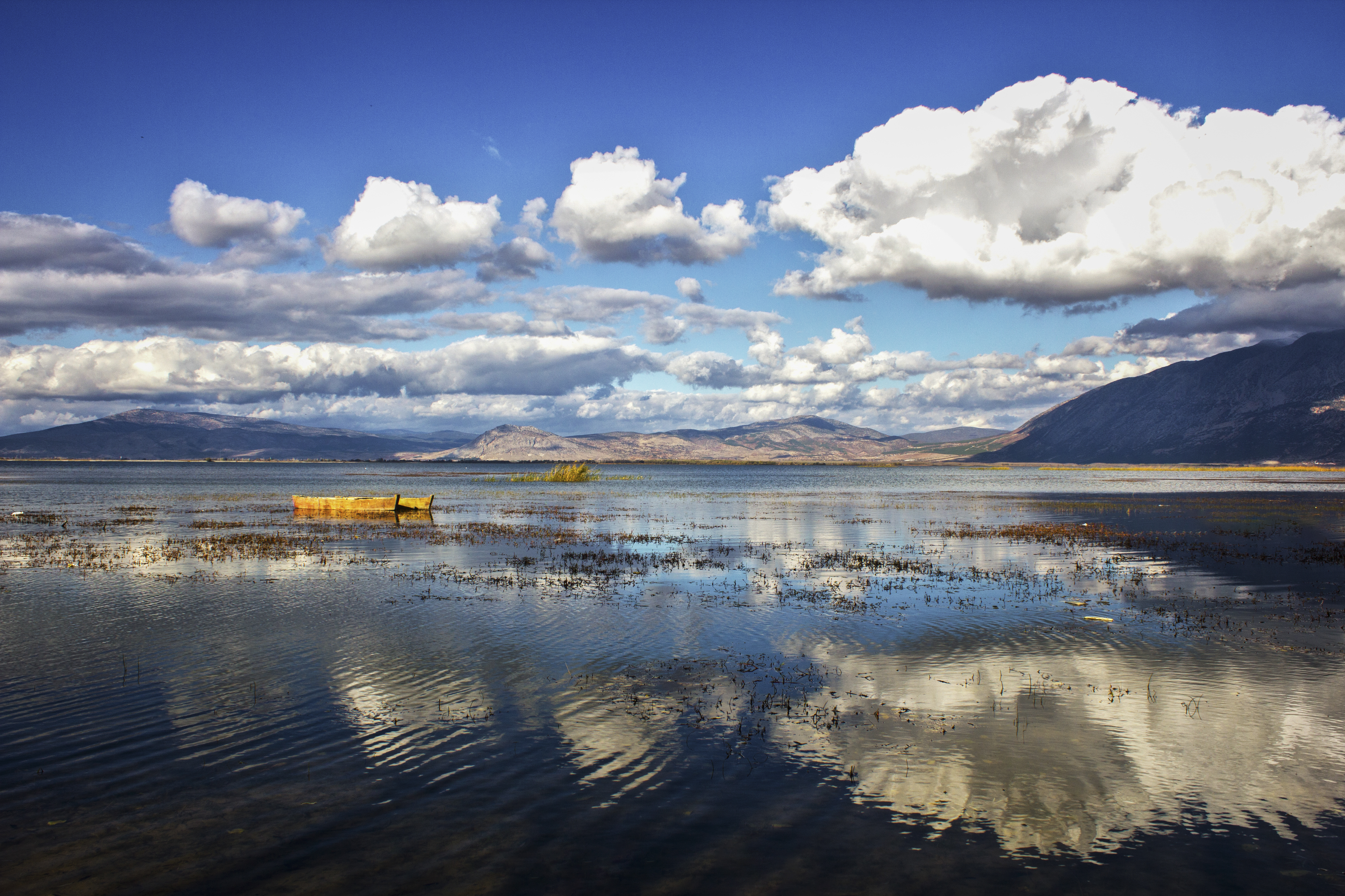

- Location within Turkey
- Location: Aegean Region
- Coordinates: 38°14′N 29°54′E
- Basin countries: Turkey
- Surface area: 73 km^{2} (28 sq mi)
- Surface elevation: 821 m (2,694 ft)

Lake Işıklı (Turkish: Işıklı Gölü) is a freshwater lake in Turkey's inner Aegean Region extending on Çivril Plain between the provinces of Denizli and Afyonkarahisar. The lake is bordered by the boundaries of several districts, namely, clockwise Çivril (Denizli Province), the principal urban center of the region, and Kızılören, Dinar and Evciler (Afyonkarahisar Province). A township on the lake shore and that is part of Çivril district carries the same name as the lake (Işıklı).

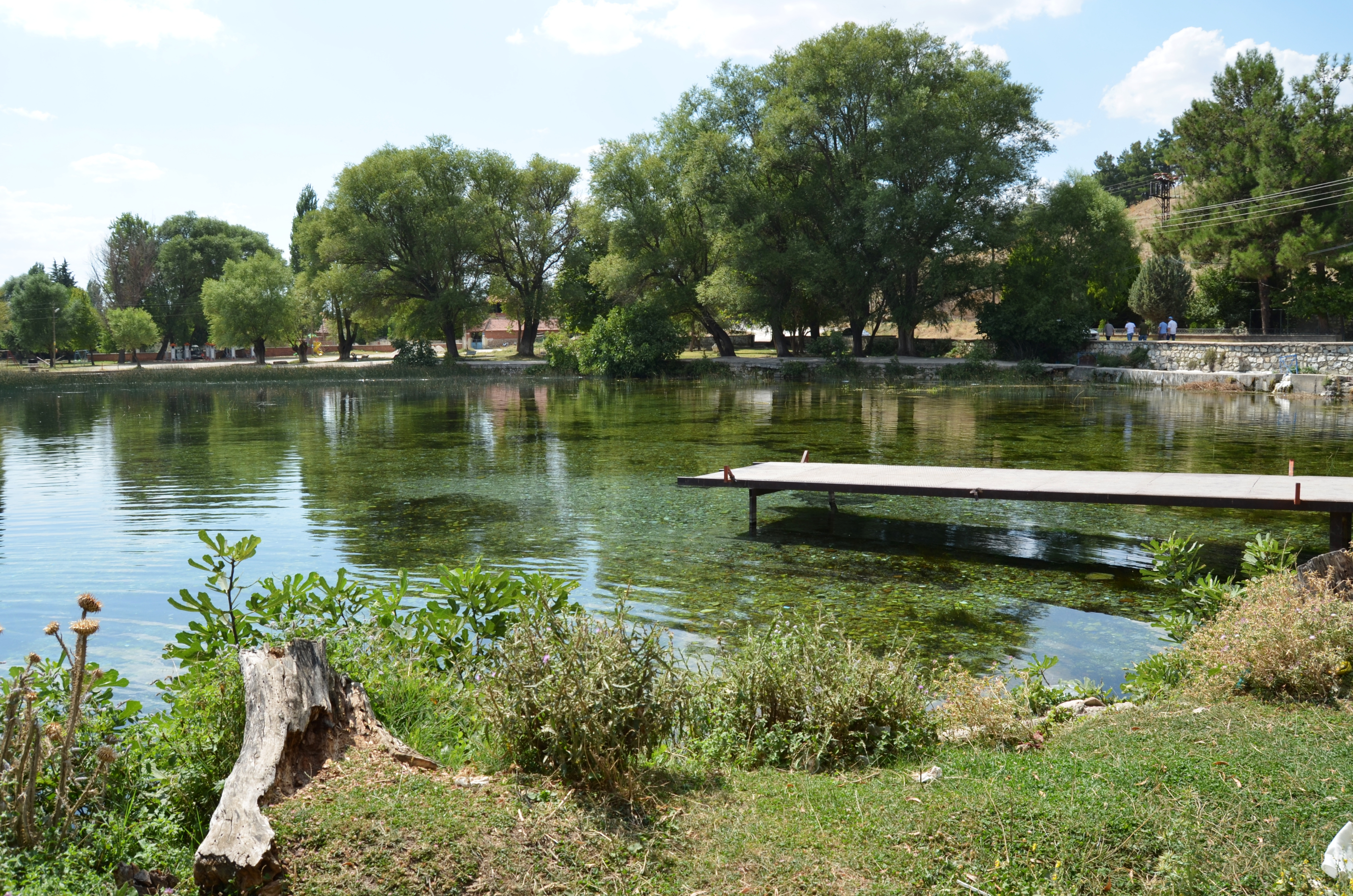
A pier on the shore of Lake Işıklı

The lake lies at an altitude of 821 m and its area is 73 square kilometres. Its waters fed by streams are used for irrigation for the surrounding agricultural lands and the lake is also an important fishing and aquaculture center at regional scale.

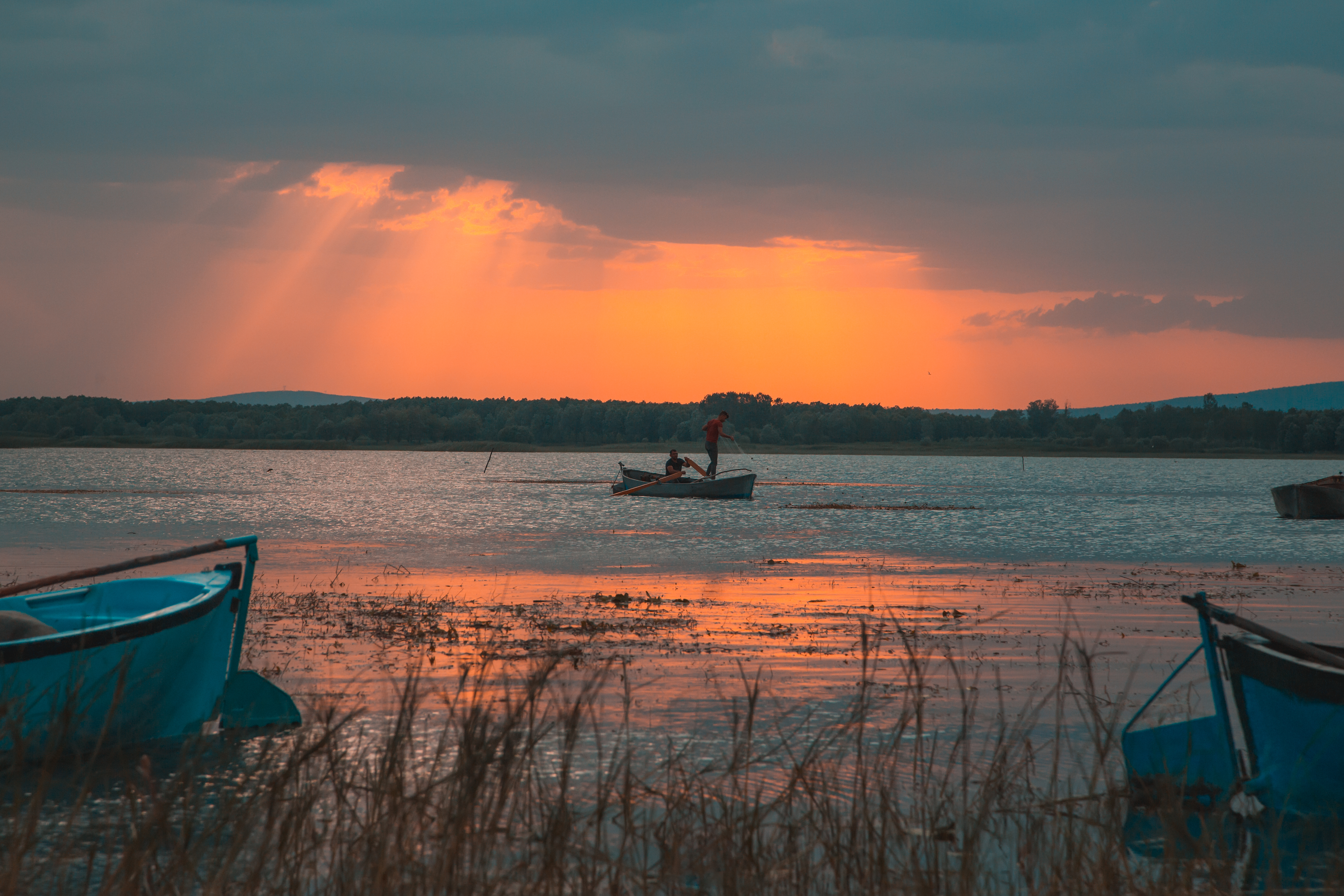
Sunset in Lake Işıklı

Lake Işıklı is an important site for breeding waterbirds and large numbers of wintering wildfowl. It has been assessed as an Important Bird Area. Some of the species that breed or migrate through Lake Işıklı are; greater white-fronted goose (Anser albifrons), red-crested pochard (Netta rufina), common pochard (Aythya ferina), ferruginous duck (Aythya nyroca), squacco heron (Ardeola ralloides), pygmy cormorant (Phalacrocorax pygmeus), common coot (Fulica atra), gull-billed tern (Sterna nilotica), whiskered tern (Chlidonias hybrida).

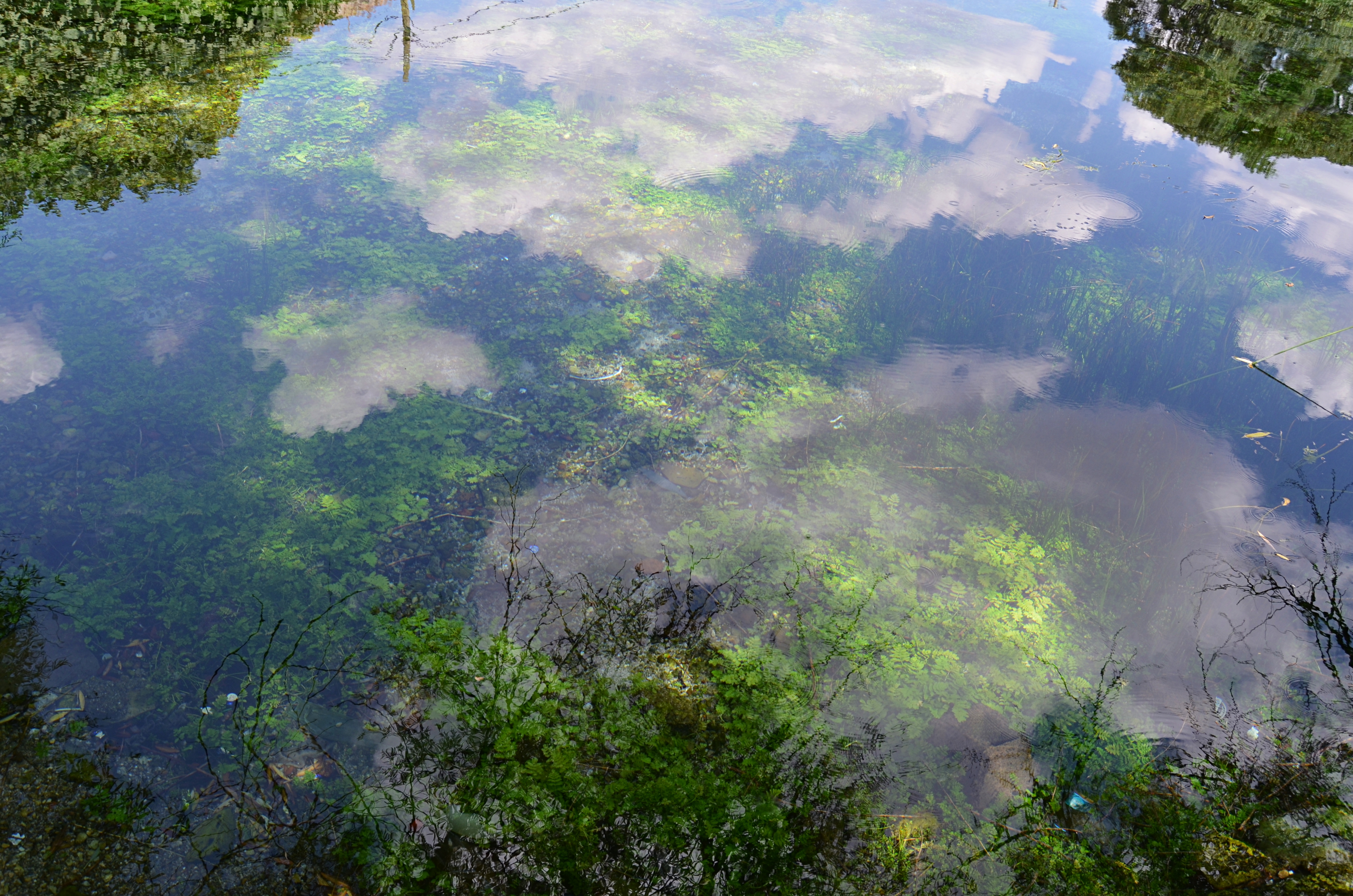
Lakebed of Işıklı Gölü
