= Sawran =

Sawran may refer to:

- Sawran (Kazakhstan)
- Sawran, Syria

== See also ==
- Savran (disambiguation)
