= Baklankuyucak, Bozkurt =

Village in Turkey

Baklankuyucak
- Neighbourhood
- Location in Turkey Baklankuyucak (Turkey Aegean)
- Coordinates: 37°54′N 29°33′E
- Country: Turkey
- Province: Denizli
- District: Bozkurt
- Population (2022): 230
- Time zone: UTC+3 (TRT)

Baklankuyucak is a neighbourhood in the municipality and district of Bozkurt, Denizli Province in Turkey. Its population is 230 (2022).
