= Bulgurlar, Çivril =

Village in Turkey

Bulgurlar
- Neighbourhood
- Location in Turkey Bulgurlar (Turkey Aegean)
- Coordinates: 38°16′N 29°44′E
- Country: Turkey
- Province: Denizli
- District: Çivril
- Population (2022): 178
- Time zone: UTC+3 (TRT)

Bulgurlar is a neighbourhood in the municipality and district of Çivril, Denizli Province in Turkey. Its population is 178 (2022).
