= İkizbaba, Bekilli =

Village in Turkey

İkizbaba
- Neighbourhood
- Location in Turkey İkizbaba (Turkey Aegean)
- Coordinates: 38°15′31″N 29°33′20″E
- Country: Turkey
- Province: Denizli
- District: Bekilli
- Population (2022): 139
- Time zone: UTC+3 (TRT)

İkizbaba (also Ekizbaba) is a neighbourhood in the municipality and district of Bekilli, Denizli Province in Turkey. Its population is 139 (2022).
