= Sırıklı, Bekilli =

Village in Turkey

Sırıklı
- Neighbourhood
- Country: Turkey
- Province: Denizli
- District: Bekilli
- Population (2022): 525
- Time zone: UTC+3 (TRT)

Sırıklı is a neighbourhood in the municipality and district of Bekilli, Denizli Province in Turkey. Its population is 525 (2022).
