= Yenibağlar, Bozkurt =

Village in Turkey

Yenibağlar
- Neighbourhood
- Location in Turkey Yenibağlar (Turkey Aegean)
- Coordinates: 37°48′N 29°32′E
- Country: Turkey
- Province: Denizli
- District: Bozkurt
- Population (2022): 248
- Time zone: UTC+3 (TRT)

Yenibağlar is a neighbourhood in the municipality and district of Bozkurt, Denizli Province in Turkey. Its population is 248 (2022).
