= Yeniçeşme, Beyağaç =

Village in Turkey

Yeniçeşme
- Neighbourhood
- Location in Turkey Yeniçeşme (Turkey Aegean)
- Coordinates: 37°15′N 28°58′E
- Country: Turkey
- Province: Denizli
- District: Beyağaç
- Population (2022): 252
- Time zone: UTC+3 (TRT)

Yeniçeşme is a neighbourhood in the municipality and district of Beyağaç, Denizli Province in Turkey. Its population is 252 (2022).
