= Seraserli, Çivril =

Village in Turkey

Seraserli
- Neighbourhood
- Location in Turkey Seraserli (Turkey Aegean)
- Coordinates: 38°14′N 29°49′E
- Country: Turkey
- Province: Denizli
- District: Çivril
- Population (2022): 240
- Time zone: UTC+3 (TRT)

Seraserli is a neighbourhood in the municipality and district of Çivril, Denizli Province in Turkey. Its population is 240 (2022).
