= Kızılcasöğüt, Çivril =

Village in Turkey

Kızılcasöğüt
- Neighbourhood
- Location in Turkey Kızılcasöğüt (Turkey Aegean)
- Coordinates: 38°17′00″N 29°44′20″E
- Country: Turkey
- Province: Denizli
- District: Çivril
- Population (2022): 3,370
- Time zone: UTC+3 (TRT)

Kızılcasöğüt is a neighbourhood of the municipality and district of Çivril, Denizli Province, Turkey. Its population is 3,370 (2022). Before the 2013 reorganisation, it was a town (belde).
