= Dağal, Baklan =

Village in Turkey

Dağal
- Neighbourhood
- Location in Turkey Dağal (Turkey Aegean)
- Coordinates: 38°00′42″N 29°36′58″E
- Country: Turkey
- Province: Denizli
- District: Baklan
- Population (2022): 410
- Time zone: UTC+3 (TRT)

Dağal is a neighbourhood of the municipality and district of Baklan, Denizli Province, Turkey. Its population is 410 (2022). Before the 2013 reorganisation, it was a town (belde).
