= Bekilli =

- District and municipality
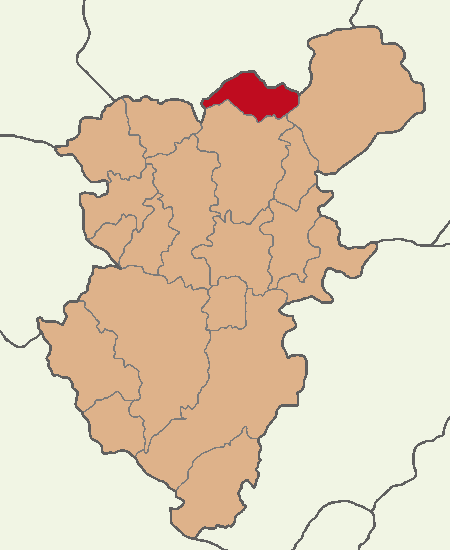
- Map showing Bekilli District in Denizli Province

- Location in Turkey Bekilli (Turkey Aegean)
- Coordinates: 38°13′55″N 29°25′18″E
- Country: Turkey
- Province: Denizli

Government
  - Mayor: Önder Demir (CHP)
- Area: 304 km^{2} (117 sq mi)
- Population (2022): 6,424
  - Density: 21.1/km^{2} (54.7/sq mi)
- Time zone: UTC+3 (TRT)
- Postal code: 20930
- Area code: 0258
- Website: www.bekilli.bel.tr

Bekilli is a municipality and district of Denizli Province, Turkey. Its area is 304 km^{2}, and its population is 6,424 (2022). Bekilli district area neighbors the district areas of Çal and Çivril, both also depending Denizli to the west, south and east, and those of two districts of Uşak Province to the north, namely Ulubey and Karahallı.

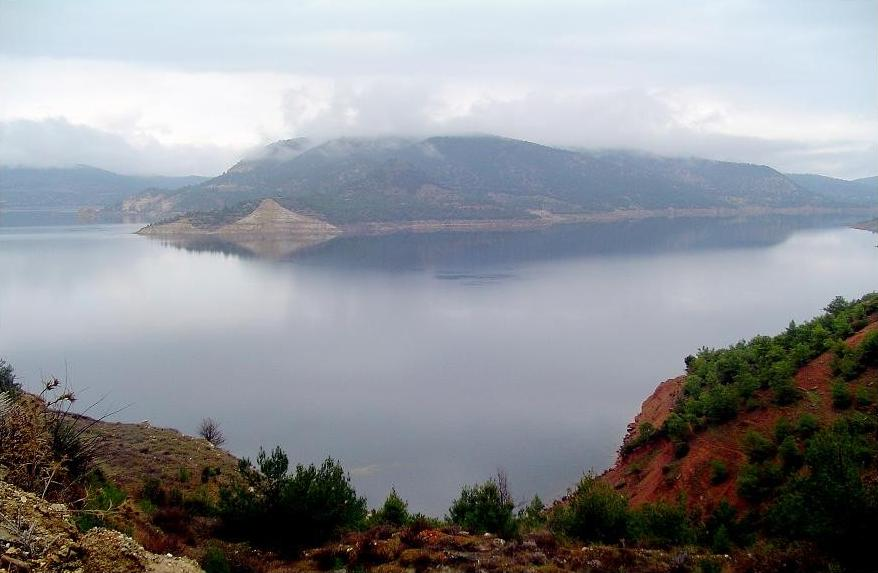
Adıgüzel Dam Reservoir between the areas of Bekilli, Çal, Güney and Ulubey districts

The town of Bekilli is located in the inner Aegean region midway between the province seats of Denizli and Uşak, at a distance of 82 km (51 mi) from the first and 86 km (53 mi) from the second.

The town is renowned for its vineyards and celebrates an annual wine festival. Viticulture is a principal constituent of local culture.

Until the confirmation of its site slightly north of the town and south of the present-day neighboring district center of Karahallı, at a very short distance from Bekilli, the location of Bekilli was one of the leading candidates matched with ancient Pepuza (as well as its neighboring Tymion), associated with Montanism. Nevertheless, there are interesting and yet largely unexplored traces dating from Phrygian, Lydian, Roman and early Christian and Byzantine periods within Bekilli district area itself.

== Composition ==
There are 15 neighbourhoods in Bekilli District:

- Bahçeli
- Bükrüce
- Çamköy
- Çoğaşlı
- Deşdemir
- Gömce
- İkizbaba
- Köselli
- Kutlubey
- Poyrazlı
- Sırıklı
- Üçkuyu
- Yahyalar
- Yeni
- Yeşiloba
