= Aktaş, Çivril =

Village in Turkey

Aktaş
- Neighbourhood
- Location in Turkey Aktaş (Turkey Aegean)
- Coordinates: 38.3347°N 29.9184°E
- Country: Turkey
- Province: Denizli
- District: Çivril
- Population (2022): 52
- Time zone: UTC+3 (TRT)

Aktaş is a neighbourhood in the municipality and district of Çivril, Denizli Province in Turkey. Its population is 52 (2022).
