= Serinhisar =

- District and municipality
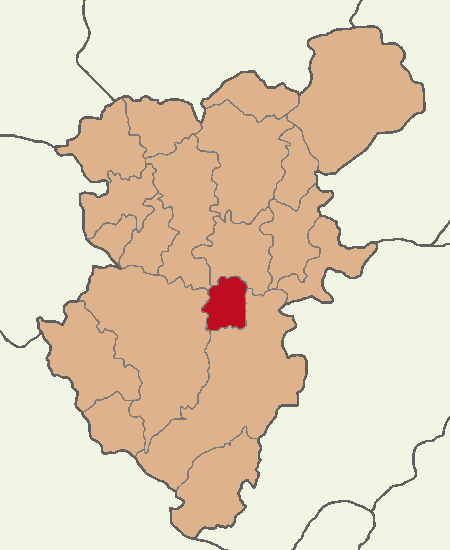
- Map showing Serinhisar District in Denizli Province

- Location in Turkey Serinhisar (Turkey Aegean)
- Coordinates: 37°34′50″N 29°16′11″E
- Country: Turkey
- Province: Denizli

Government
  - Mayor: Hüseyin Gemi (CHP)
- Area: 256 km^{2} (99 sq mi)
- Elevation: 941 m (3,087 ft)
- Population (2022): 14,355
  - Density: 56.1/km^{2} (145/sq mi)
- Time zone: UTC+3 (TRT)
- Postal code: 20430
- Area code: 0258
- Website: www.serinhisar.bel.tr

Serinhisar is a municipality and district of Denizli Province, Turkey. Its area is 256 km^{2}, and its population is 14,355 (2022).

== Name ==
Other names include Karia (in Latin) and Kızılhisar (literally "a red castle"). The latter is the name given by the Seljuk Turks as there were brick built fortifications here. The name was changed to Serinhisar (literally "a cool castle") in 1987, apparently because red castle was too symbolic of communism.

== History ==
The area was first settled by the Hittites in 1500 BC, and later passed into the hands of the Lydians (800 BC), Persians (546 BC), Ancient Greeks (440 BC), Ancient Macedonians (334 BC) and Romans (133 BC). When the Roman Empire was divided in 395 the area remained within the Eastern Roman Empire (Byzantine) and was then possessed by the Seljuk Turks in 1077, who ruled until 1308. Turkmens (from Oghuz Turks' Avsar and Kayi tribe) were settled in the district in this period. Seljuk rule was interrupted by the Crusades, Genghis Khan, and Timurlane, who left the area under the rule of the Germiyan dynasty, from whom it passed to the Ottoman Empire in 1429. The castle fell into ruin in the Ottoman period and was broken up for building materials, being finally demolished in 1954.

=== The battle of Kazıkbeli ===
During the Second Crusade in 1148 the French king was proceeding eastwards having crossed the Menderes River but was stalled at the pass of Kazıkbeli, near Kızılhisar, by the Seljuk armies.

== Composition ==
There are 11 neighbourhoods in Serinhisar District:

- Aşağı
- Ayaz
- Cumhuriyet
- Kaya
- Kocapınar
- Orta
- Pınarcık
- Şair Eşref
- Yatağan
- Yenice
- Yüreğil

== Serinhisar today ==
Today Serinhisar is known for its leblebi (roasted chick peas), pottery, ropemaking and shoemaking. This is a rural area and its people are hospitable and warmblooded.
