= Köselli, Bekilli =

Village in Turkey

Köselli
- Neighbourhood
- Location in Turkey Köselli (Turkey Aegean)
- Coordinates: 38°19′N 29°23′E
- Country: Turkey
- Province: Denizli
- District: Bekilli
- Population (2022): 140
- Time zone: UTC+3 (TRT)

Köselli is a neighbourhood in the municipality and district of Bekilli, Denizli Province in Turkey. Its population is 140 (2022).
