= Avdan, Bozkurt =

Village in Turkey

Avdan
- Neighbourhood
- Location in Turkey Avdan (Turkey Aegean)
- Coordinates: 37.8931°N 29.6568°E
- Country: Turkey
- Province: Denizli
- District: Bozkurt
- Population (2022): 347
- Time zone: UTC+3 (TRT)

Avdan is a neighbourhood in the municipality and district of Bozkurt, Denizli Province in Turkey. Its population is 347 (2022).
