= Çapak, Çivril =

Village in Turkey

Çapak
- Neighbourhood
- Location in Turkey Çapak (Turkey Aegean)
- Coordinates: 38.4294°N 29.8686°E
- Country: Turkey
- Province: Denizli
- District: Çivril
- Population (2022): 152
- Time zone: UTC+3 (TRT)

Çapak is a neighbourhood in the municipality and district of Çivril, Denizli Province in Turkey. Its population is 152 (2022).
