= Beykeuy =

Beykeuy: Μπέικιοϊ (Greek); Beyköy (Turkish)
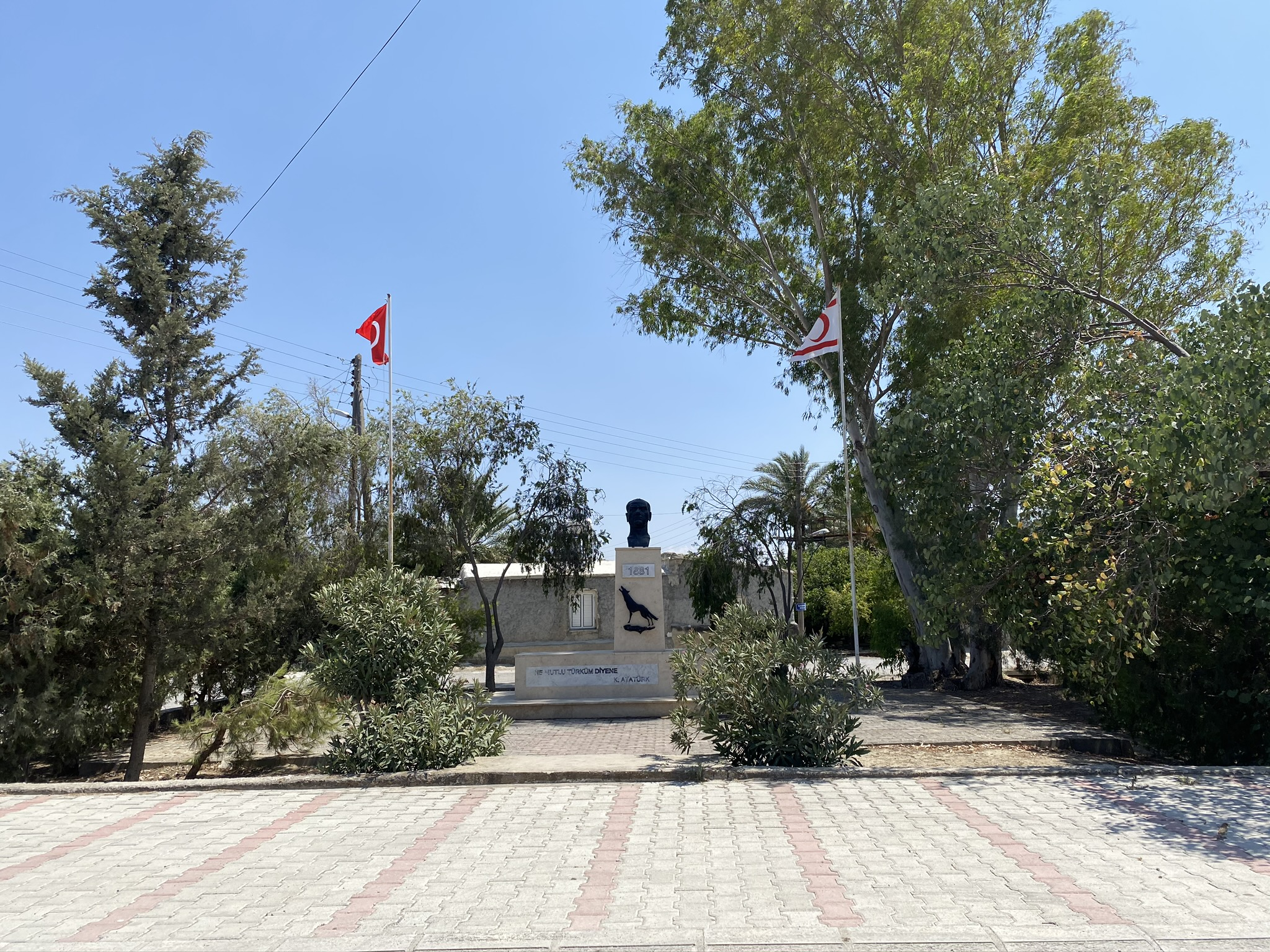
- A bust of Mustafa Kemal Atatürk in the central square of Beyköy, 2020.

- Location in Cyprus
- Coordinates: 35°14′11″N 33°30′4″E
- Country (de jure): Cyprus
  - District: Nicosia District
- Country (de facto): Northern Cyprus
  - District: Lefkoşa District
- Time zone: UTC+2 (EET)
  - Summer (DST): UTC+3 (EEST)

Beykeuy (Greek: Μπέικιοϊ; Turkish: Beyköy) is a village in the Nicosia District of Cyprus, southeast of Kythrea. De facto, it is under the control of Northern Cyprus.
