= Sazak, Beyağaç =

Village in Turkey

Sazak
- Neighbourhood
- Country: Turkey
- Province: Denizli
- District: Beyağaç
- Population (2022): 709
- Time zone: UTC+3 (TRT)

Sazak is a neighbourhood in the municipality and district of Beyağaç, Denizli Province in Turkey. Its population is 709 (2022).
