= Hadim, Baklan =

Village in Turkey

Hadim
- Neighbourhood
- Country: Turkey
- Province: Denizli
- District: Baklan
- Population (2022): 433
- Time zone: UTC+3 (TRT)

Hadim is a neighbourhood in the municipality and district of Baklan, Denizli Province in Turkey. Its population is 433 (2022).
