= Kavaklar, Baklan =

Village in Turkey

Kavaklar
- Neighbourhood
- Location in Turkey Kavaklar (Turkey Aegean)
- Coordinates: 38°07′26″N 29°34′17″E
- Country: Turkey
- Province: Denizli
- District: Baklan
- Population (2022): 375
- Time zone: UTC+3 (TRT)

Kavaklar is a neighbourhood in the municipality and district of Baklan, Denizli Province in Turkey. Its population is 375 (2022).
