= Gürpınar, Çivril =

Village in Turkey

Gürpınar
- Neighbourhood
- Location in Turkey Gürpınar (Turkey Aegean)
- Coordinates: 38°24′55″N 29°42′08″E
- Country: Turkey
- Province: Denizli
- District: Çivril
- Population (2022): 3,706
- Time zone: UTC+3 (TRT)

Gürpınar is a neighbourhood of the municipality and district of Çivril, Denizli Province, Turkey. Its population is 3,706 (2022). Before the 2013 reorganisation, it was a town (belde).
