= İncelertekkesi, Bozkurt =

Village in Turkey

İncelertekkesi
- Neighbourhood
- Location in Turkey İncelertekkesi (Turkey Aegean)
- Coordinates: 37°42′N 29°36′E
- Country: Turkey
- Province: Denizli
- District: Bozkurt
- Population (2022): 130
- Time zone: UTC+3 (TRT)

İncelertekkesi is a neighbourhood in the municipality and district of Bozkurt, Denizli Province in Turkey. Its population is 130 (2022).
