= Karabedirler, Çivril =

Village in Turkey

Karabedirler
- Neighbourhood
- Location in Turkey Karabedirler (Turkey Aegean)
- Coordinates: 38°19′N 29°39′E
- Country: Turkey
- Province: Denizli
- District: Çivril
- Population (2022): 835
- Time zone: UTC+3 (TRT)

Karabedirler is a neighbourhood in the municipality and district of Çivril, Denizli Province in Turkey. Its population is 835 (2022).
