= Baklan =

- District and municipality
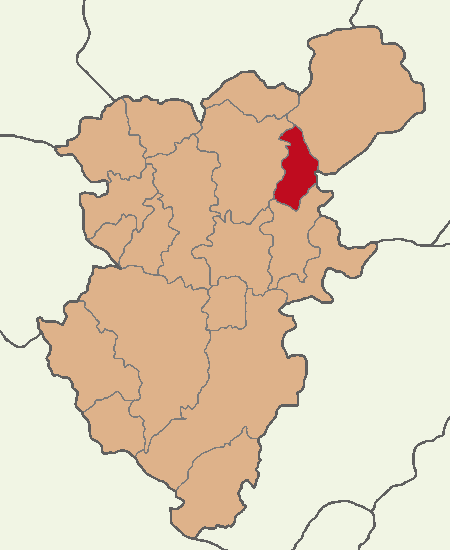
- Map showing Baklan District in Denizli Province

- Location in Turkey Baklan (Turkey Aegean)
- Coordinates: 37°58′37″N 29°36′31″E
- Country: Turkey
- Province: Denizli

Government
  - Mayor: Yusuf Gülsever (AKP)
- Area: 283 km^{2} (109 sq mi)
- Elevation: 950 m (3,120 ft)
- Population (2022): 5,296
  - Density: 18.7/km^{2} (48.5/sq mi)
- Time zone: UTC+3 (TRT)
- Postal code: 20770
- Area code: 0258
- Website: denizlibaklan.bel.tr

Baklan is a municipality and district of Denizli Province, Turkey. Its area is 283 km^{2}, and its population is 5,296 (2022). The town is at a distance of about an hour from the city of Denizli, neighboring the town of Çivril, and it is situated on the road to Ankara.

== Name ==
For the pre-Turkish period, it is deduced that the plain of Baklan corresponded to the settlements named Lounda and Lakèrion (Λακήριον in Ancient greek). The plain and the region was the scene of the final great efforts made after the 1176 Battle of Myriokephalon by the Byzantine Emperor Manuel I Komnenos in person to drive out and to hold territory against the victorious Seljuk Turks. However, it is inferred that the nomad Turks had already established themselves in Lounda and Lakerion (Baklan).

The subsequent Turkish town was alternatively called Dedeköy, a name which was its official appellation in some periods in the past. The name dede makes reference to the 13th century Seljuk warrior Alp Eren Hüsamettin Gazi Bey, whose tomb is within the town.

== Administration, geography, economy ==
A township depending Çal district until 1990, it was made into a district at that time.

A large part of the district is covered by the high plain that carries the same name as the town, Baklan Plain, and the town itself is situated on the slopes of the district's only mountain, Beşparmak, 1307 m. high.

The economy is largely based on agriculture.

== Composition ==
There are 14 neighbourhoods in Baklan District:

- Balca
- Beyelli
- Boğaziçi
- Çataloba
- Dağal
- Gökpınar
- Gürlük
- Hadim
- Hüsamettindede
- İcikli
- Kavaklar
- Kirazlı
- Konak
- Şenyayla

== Image gallery ==
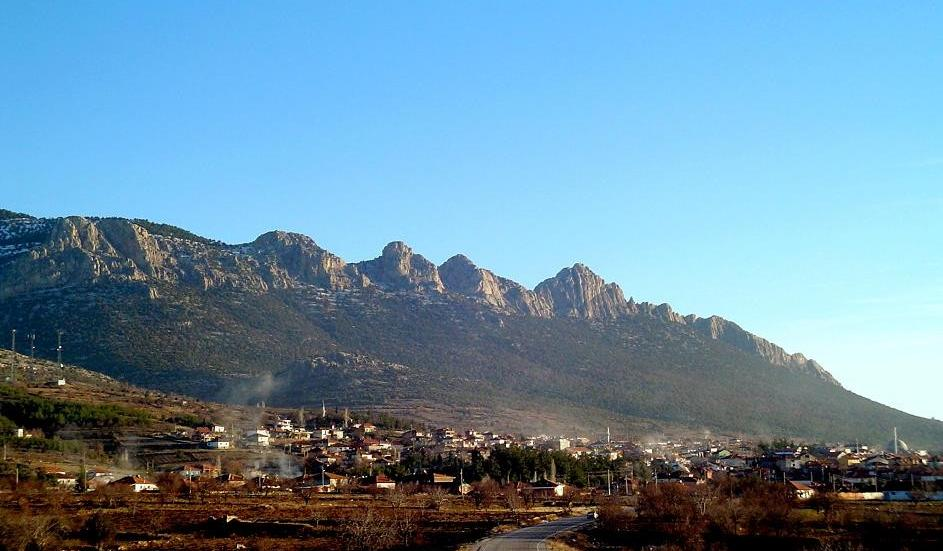
Baklan town general view

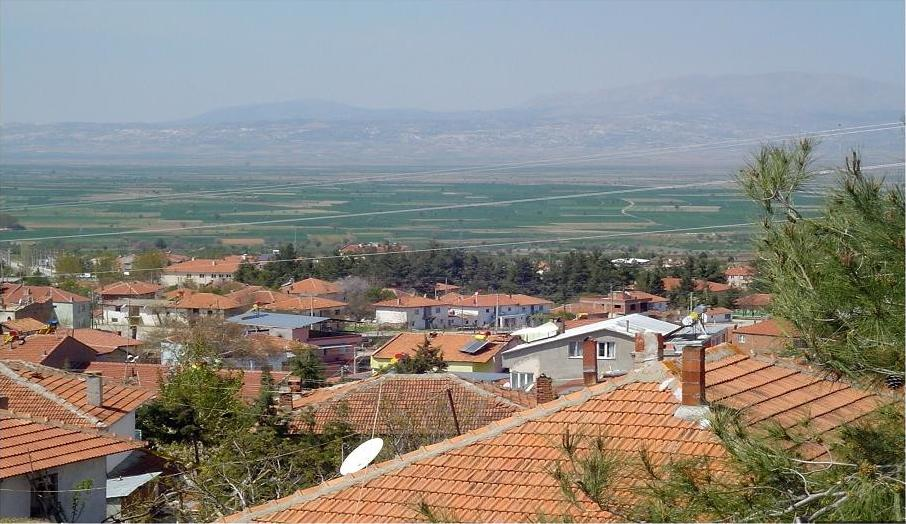
Baklan plain general view
