= Karayahşılar, Çivril =

Village in Turkey

Karayahşılar
- Neighbourhood
- Location in Turkey Karayahşılar (Turkey Aegean)
- Coordinates: 38°13′12″N 29°43′43″E
- Country: Turkey
- Province: Denizli
- District: Çivril
- Population (2022): 1,123
- Time zone: UTC+3 (TRT)

Karayahşılar is a neighbourhood in the municipality and district of Çivril, Denizli Province in Turkey. Its population is 1,123 (2022).
