= Çoğaşlı, Bekilli =

Village in Turkey

Çoğaşlı
- Neighbourhood
- Location in Turkey Çoğaşlı (Turkey Aegean)
- Coordinates: 38°14′N 29°21′E
- Country: Turkey
- Province: Denizli
- District: Bekilli
- Population (2022): 246
- Time zone: UTC+3 (TRT)

Çoğaşlı is a neighbourhood in the municipality and district of Bekilli, Denizli Province in Turkey. Its population is 246 (2022).
