= Boğaziçi, Baklan =

Village in Turkey

Boğaziçi
- Neighbourhood
- Location in Turkey Boğaziçi (Turkey Aegean)
- Coordinates: 37°56′07″N 29°32′56″E
- Country: Turkey
- Province: Denizli
- District: Baklan
- Population (2022): 504
- Time zone: UTC+3 (TRT)

Boğaziçi is a neighbourhood of the municipality and district of Baklan, Denizli Province, Turkey. Its population is 504 (2022). Before the 2013 reorganisation, it was a town (belde).
