= Kıralan, Çivril =

Village in Turkey

Kıralan
- Neighbourhood
- Location in Turkey Kıralan (Turkey Aegean)
- Coordinates: 38°07′13″N 29°38′16″E
- Country: Turkey
- Province: Denizli
- District: Çivril
- Population (2022): 4,947
- Time zone: UTC+3 (TRT)

Kıralan is a neighbourhood of the municipality and district of Çivril, Denizli Province, Turkey. Its population is 4,947 (2022). Before the 2013 reorganisation, it was a town (belde).
