= Çağlayan, Çivril =

Village in Turkey

Çağlayan
- Neighbourhood
- Location in Turkey Çağlayan (Turkey Aegean)
- Coordinates: 38.3507°N 29.8425°E
- Country: Turkey
- Province: Denizli
- District: Çivril
- Population (2022): 22
- Time zone: UTC+3 (TRT)

Çağlayan is a neighbourhood in the municipality and district of Çivril, Denizli Province in Turkey. Its population is 22 (2022).
