= Mecidiye, Bozkurt =

Village in Turkey

Mecidiye
- Neighbourhood
- Country: Turkey
- Province: Denizli
- District: Bozkurt
- Population (2022): 63
- Time zone: UTC+3 (TRT)

Mecidiye is a neighbourhood in the municipality and district of Bozkurt, Denizli Province in Turkey. Its population is 63 (2022).
