= Kutlubey, Bekilli =

Village in Turkey

Kutlubey
- Neighbourhood
- Country: Turkey
- Province: Denizli
- District: Bekilli
- Population (2022): 602
- Time zone: UTC+3 (TRT)

Kutlubey is a neighbourhood of the municipality and district of Bekilli, Denizli Province, Turkey. Its population is 602 (2022). Before the 2013 reorganisation, it was a town (belde).
