= Özdemirci, Çivril =

Village in Turkey

Özdemirci
- Neighbourhood
- Location in Turkey Özdemirci (Turkey Aegean)
- Coordinates: 38°02′17″N 29°44′13″E
- Country: Turkey
- Province: Denizli
- District: Çivril
- Population (2022): 1,882
- Time zone: UTC+3 (TRT)

Özdemirci is a neighbourhood of the municipality and district of Çivril, Denizli Province, Turkey. Its population is 1,882 (2022). Before the 2013 reorganisation, it was a town (belde).
