= Çakallar, Alanya =

Çakallar
- Neighbourhood
- Location in Turkey
- Coordinates: 36.689°N 31.729°E
- Country: Turkey
- Province: Antalya
- District: Alanya
- Population (2022): 615
- Time zone: UTC+3 (TRT)

Çakallar is a neighborhood in the municipality and district of Alanya, Antalya Province, Turkey. Its population is 615 (2022).
