= Gömce, Bekilli =

Village in Turkey

Gömce
- Neighbourhood
- Location in Turkey Gömce (Turkey Aegean)
- Coordinates: 38°13′N 29°32′E
- Country: Turkey
- Province: Denizli
- District: Bekilli
- Population (2022): 504
- Time zone: UTC+3 (TRT)

Gömce is a neighbourhood in the municipality and district of Bekilli, Denizli Province in Turkey. Its population is 504 (2022).
