= Kaber =

Kaber may refer to:

- a variant spelling for caber

== People ==
- Kaber (Jubilees), a person named in the Book of Jubilees

== Place ==
- Kaber, Cumbria
