= Geriçam, Beyağaç =

Village in Turkey

Geriçam
- Neighbourhood
- Location in Turkey Geriçam (Turkey Aegean)
- Coordinates: 37°14′11″N 28°56′14″E
- Country: Turkey
- Province: Denizli
- District: Beyağaç
- Population (2022): 330
- Time zone: UTC+3 (TRT)

Geriçam is a neighbourhood in the municipality and district of Beyağaç, Denizli Province in Turkey. Its population is 330 (2022).
