= İnceler, Bozkurt =

Town in Turkey

İnceler
- Neighbourhood
- Location in Turkey İnceler (Turkey Aegean)
- Coordinates: 37°42′43″N 29°34′40″E
- Country: Turkey
- Province: Denizli
- District: Bozkurt
- Time zone: UTC+3 (TRT)

İnceler (also: İnceler Kasabası) is a neighbourhood of the municipality and district of Bozkurt, Denizli Province, Turkey. Before the 2013 reorganisation, it was a town (belde).

== History ==
The true history of the place is not exactly known, as the first inhabitants of İnceler dates back 800–900 years from now. There are various rumours told by the elders of the town about this. According to the most widely accepted one;

Physical conditions of the area were very attractive for nomadic people because there were two lakes in the name of "Küçük göl" and "Kanlıca göl" which are lacking water at present (however the municipality is now working on filling them with water once more). Besides, the mountainous part of the area was full of pastures to feed the animals, so the Yörüks used to spend the spring and summer months in this area (it is known that there are graves of the Yörüks around Küçük göl).

It is said that İnce Ali (one of the Yoruk Beys), placed his nomad camp near the spring of water that came from the mountains and settled down where İnceler town is located now. In time, this nomad camp got populous and with the migrations from surrounding villages, it eventually became a village. According to the rumours, İnce Ali died while building a mosque and the town was named İnceler to the honour of him.

Some findings reveal that the Greek were occupied with forestry work around Karakısık before the term of Republic. However they left the area after the foundation of Republic.

Inceler remained as a village until 1955 and governed by a muhtar (the elected head of a village), but it became a municipality in 1955.
