= Kocayaka, Çivril =

Village in Turkey

Kocayaka
- Neighbourhood
- Location in Turkey Kocayaka (Turkey Aegean)
- Coordinates: 38°14′58″N 29°39′21″E
- Country: Turkey
- Province: Denizli
- District: Çivril
- Population (2022): 743
- Time zone: UTC+3 (TRT)

Kocayaka is a neighbourhood in the municipality and district of Çivril, Denizli Province in Turkey. Its population is 743 (2022).
