= Çambaşı, Bozkurt =

Village in Turkey

Çambaşı
- Neighbourhood
- Location in Turkey Çambaşı (Turkey Aegean)
- Coordinates: 37.7625°N 29.5180°E
- Country: Turkey
- Province: Denizli
- District: Bozkurt
- Population (2022): 272
- Time zone: UTC+3 (TRT)

Çambaşı is a neighbourhood in the municipality and district of Bozkurt, Denizli Province in Turkey. Its population is 272 (2022).
