= Gökgöl Cave =

Show cave in Zonguldak Province, Turkey

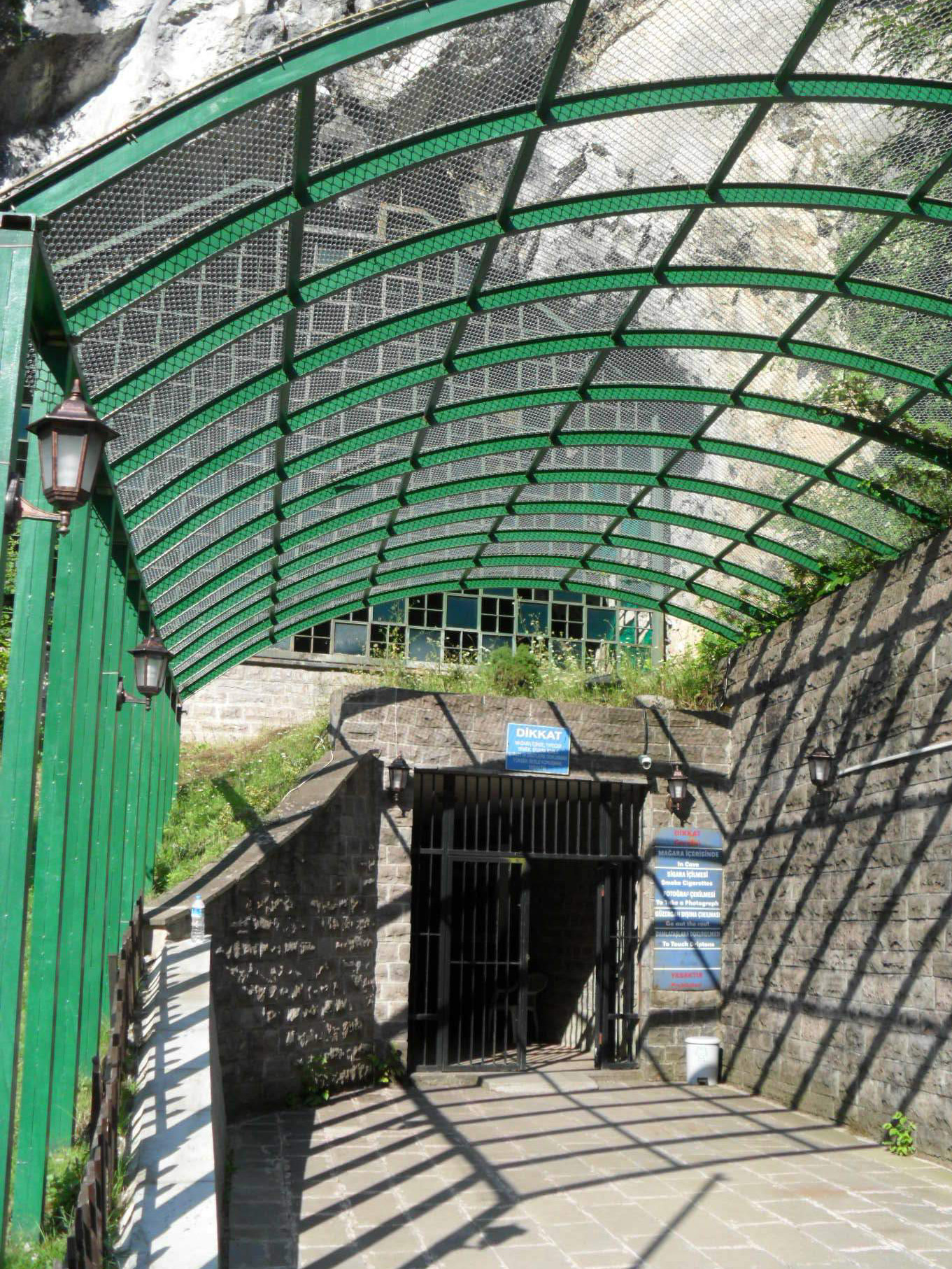
- Entrance to Gökgöl Cave

- Location within Turkey
- Location: Zonguldak Province, Turkey
- Coordinates: 41°26′35″N 31°49′53″E
- Length: 3,350 m (10,990 ft)
- Discovery: 1976
- Access: 2001

Gökgöl Cave (Turkish: Gökgöl Mağarası) is a show cave in Zonguldak Province, Turkey. It is the fifth biggest cave in the country. It is close to a main highway and is well-decorated with stalactites and stalagmites and attracts many visitors.

== Location ==
The cave is located 5 km (3.1 mi) southeast of Zonguldak on the roadside of Zongıldak-Ankara highway D.750.

== Formation and geology ==
The cave is situated at 82 m (269 ft) above main sea level on the eastern bank of Erçek Creek, which has eroded its riverbed to a deeper level. It is an active or semi-active speleogenesis cave system that has been forming since the rocks were laid down in the Neogene period, between 7.0 and 2.5 million years ago. The karst cave was formed horizontally inside carboniferous limestone. The cave consists of four distinct rock layers, which show that the region underwent four different geomorphological periods. An east-west directed fault was also instrumental in the formation of the cave in addition to the dissolution of limestone by carbonic acid.

The total length of the east–west directed cave is 3,350 m (11,000 ft). It consists of a main gallery and two auxiliary galleries, one stretching towards north and the other southwards. The cave has three entrances, two of them being from previous periods, and one is still active. Situated beside Erçek Creek, the hydrological active entrance is inaccessible to humans because it is narrow and wet. The cave is entered through a large mouth located at a higher level. A 875 m (2,900 ft)-long portion of the cave is open to the public.

The main gallery ends at a narrow and wet siphon, which is 10 m (33 ft) higher than the entrance. There are large chambers formed by collapse of the roof where auxiliary galleries branch off. The section of the main gallery between the entrance and the large collapse chamber varies from 2 to 15 m (7 to 49 ft) wide, and has a height of 1–18 m (3–59 ft). By contrast, the following gallery section is only 1 to 5 m (3 to 16 ft) wide, and its height varies between 0.5 and 8 m (2 and 26 ft). The southern gallery is older than the northwards directed one. The northern gallery is much narrower than the other gallery. Underground water running in the cave joins Erçek Creek. The cave section in the vadose zone, the main gallery and the great collapse chamber, are rich with colorful speleothems such as stalactites, stalagmites, draperies, sinterfahne and dripstones. The sections beyond the great collapse chamber of the main gallery and the northern gallery contain only wall dripstones and patterns formed by underground water.

== Climate ==
Generally, there is little air movement observable in the cave; only at locations with low clearances and at the siphon is any breeze felt.

The air temperature inside the cave is different from the temperature outside. The temperature in the interior falls with increasing distance from the entrance. In July, when the outside temperature is 27 °C (81 °F), it is 18 °C (64 °F) in the entrance chamber, in front of the intermediate siphon 14 °C (57 °F), in the great collapse chamber 13 °C (55 °F), in the northern and southern galleries 12 °C (54 °F), and it drops to 11 °C (52 °F) at the end of the main gallery.

Relative humidity inside the cave also differs from that outside with increasing values going further in. It was observed as 61% at the entrance chamber, in front of the intermediate siphon 87%, in the middle of the northern gallery 86%, at the southern gallery 88% and at the end of the main gallery as 89%, compared to an outside relative humidity of 55%.

The cave establishes a microclimatic area with its local set of atmospheric conditions. In the summer time, it is cooler and in the winter months, it is warmer than the surrounding area. Surveys conducted by the Zonguldak Medical Chamber showed that patients with respiratory diseases like asthma can benefit, their breathing being temporarily eased by the cave's climate.

== Hydrology ==
The cave, which shows a polycyclic character in terms of its formation, has three different hydrological zones. The vadose zone, which was formed in the first development phase, is completely dry except for water dripping from the ceiling. The existence of a subterranean river even during dry seasons is known in the main gallery beyond the great collapse chamber and in the auxiliary galleries, which are of active and semi active characteristics. Water coming from inside the cave merges at the entrance of the great collapse chamber, vanishes in the active main gallery and joins Erçek Creek. During rainy periods, water enters and forms pools on the cave floor of the section between the entrance and the siphon. Part of these waters start flowing and pour out of the second mouth after running through the sinkholes in the entrance chamber. The siphon at the end of the collapsed chamber has no outlet, and so this gets flooded during wet weather, and passages become blocked.

== Fauna ==
There is no endemic faunal species in the cave. Common animals present include a subspecies of flatworm (Platyhelminthes) and black-colored molluscs, observed in the section between the entrance and the siphon. Blind cave millipedes (Diplopoda), European cave spiders (Meta menardi) and cave bats (Myotis velifer) are the other animals found in this section. No animals have been observed beyond the siphon. The pools formed by the subterranean river are habitat for fish the size of 10–15 cm (4–6 in).

== Background and tourism ==
The cave was discovered in 1976 by Temuçen Aygen, Chris Mauer and Harvery Lomas. Between 1997 and 2001, the cave was fitted up with a 875 m (2,900 ft)-long walkway, bridges, drainage channels, lighting and sound system equipment to convert part of it into a show cave. Opened to the public in June 2001, the cave is run by the Provincial Special Administration of Zonguldak.

Thanks to its close vicinity to the main road, the number of visitors it attracts is high. Between 2001 and 2008, the cave attracted 218,000 visitors according to official records. The cave is open for visiting between 9:00–18:00 hours. It features a parking lot, snack kiosks and souvenir shops.

Gökgöl Cave was flooded in 2014, and remained closed to visitors until 2016; after removing the infrastructure damage caused by water and mud, and taking measures to guard against possible flooding in the future, the cave was re-opened in May 2016.
