= Bucak, Çivril =

Village in Turkey

Bucak
- Neighbourhood
- Location in Turkey Bucak (Turkey Aegean)
- Coordinates: 38.2454°N 29.8526°E
- Country: Turkey
- Province: Denizli
- District: Çivril
- Population (2022): 188
- Time zone: UTC+3 (TRT)

Bucak is a neighbourhood in the municipality and district of Çivril, Denizli Province in Turkey. Its population is 188 (2022).
