= Düzbel, Çivril =

Village in Turkey

Düzbel
- Neighbourhood
- Location in Turkey Düzbel (Turkey Aegean)
- Coordinates: 38°14′N 30°02′E
- Country: Turkey
- Province: Denizli
- District: Çivril
- Population (2022): 248
- Time zone: UTC+3 (TRT)

Düzbel is a neighbourhood in the municipality and district of Çivril, Denizli Province in Turkey. Its population is 248 (2022).
