= İshaklı, Alanya =

Neighborhood in Alanya, Antalya Province, Turkey

İshaklı
- Neighbourhood
- Location in Turkey
- Coordinates: 36.4329°N 32.1623°E
- Country: Turkey
- Province: Antalya
- District: Alanya
- Population (2022): 518
- Time zone: UTC+3 (TRT)

İshaklı is a neighbourhood in the municipality and district of Alanya, Antalya Province, Turkey. Its population is 518 (2022).
