= Kapuz, Beyağaç =

Village in Turkey

Kapuz
- Neighbourhood
- Country: Turkey
- Province: Denizli
- District: Beyağaç
- Population (2022): 518
- Time zone: UTC+3 (TRT)

Kapuz is a neighbourhood in the municipality and district of Beyağaç, Denizli Province in Turkey.

== Census ==
Its population is 518 (2022).
