= Beyelli, Baklan =

Village in Turkey

Beyelli
- Neighbourhood
- Location in Turkey Beyelli (Turkey Aegean)
- Coordinates: 38°07′28″N 29°34′45″E
- Country: Turkey
- Province: Denizli
- District: Baklan
- Population (2022): 428
- Time zone: UTC+3 (TRT)

Beyelli is a neighbourhood in the municipality and district of Baklan, Denizli Province in Turkey. Its population is 428 (2022).
