= Kızılcayar, Çivril =

Village in Turkey

Kızılcayar
- Neighbourhood
- Location in Turkey Kızılcayar (Turkey Aegean)
- Coordinates: 38°12′35″N 29°39′28″E
- Country: Turkey
- Province: Denizli
- District: Çivril
- Population (2022): 272
- Time zone: UTC+3 (TRT)

Kızılcayar is a neighbourhood in the municipality and district of Çivril, Denizli Province in Turkey. Its population is 272 (2022).
