= Şenyayla, Baklan =

Village in Turkey

Şenyayla
- Neighbourhood
- Location in Turkey Şenyayla (Turkey Aegean)
- Coordinates: 38°01′06″N 29°38′09″E
- Country: Turkey
- Province: Denizli
- District: Baklan
- Population (2022): 26
- Time zone: UTC+3 (TRT)

Şenyayla is a neighbourhood in the municipality and district of Baklan, Denizli Province in Turkey. Its population is 26 (2022).
