= Bayat, Çivril =

Village in Turkey

Bayat
- Neighbourhood
- Location in Turkey Bayat (Turkey Aegean)
- Coordinates: 38.1684°N 29.8204°E
- Country: Turkey
- Province: Denizli
- District: Çivril
- Population (2022): 102
- Time zone: UTC+3 (TRT)

Bayat is a neighbourhood in the municipality and district of Çivril, Denizli Province in Turkey. Its population is 102 (2022).
