= Yakacık, Çivril =

Village in Turkey

Yakacık
- Neighbourhood
- Country: Turkey
- Province: Denizli
- District: Çivril
- Population (2023): 242
- Time zone: UTC+3 (TRT)

Yakacık is a neighbourhood in the municipality and district of Çivril, Denizli Province in Turkey. Its population is 242 (2023).
