= Cumalar, Barda =

Village and municipality in Azerbaijan

Coordinates: 40°24′N 47°13′E

Cumalar (also known as Çumalar) is a village and municipality in the Barda Rayon of Azerbaijan. It has a population of 581.
