= Cumalı, Bozkurt =

Village in Turkey

Cumalı
- Neighbourhood
- Location in Turkey Cumalı (Turkey Aegean)
- Coordinates: 37.749°N 29.559°E
- Country: Turkey
- Province: Denizli
- District: Bozkurt
- Population (2022): 665
- Time zone: UTC+3 (TRT)

Cumalı is a neighbourhood in the municipality and district of Bozkurt, Denizli Province in Turkey. Its population is 665 (2022).
