= Mehmet Ali Yatağan =

Turkish basketball player

Free agent
- Position: Shooting guard

Personal information
- Born: April 30, 1993 (age 33) Istanbul, Turkey
- Listed height: 6 ft 1 in (1.85 m)
- Listed weight: 163 lb (74 kg)

Career information
- NBA draft: 2015: undrafted
- Playing career: 2011–present

Career history
- 2011–2013: Beşiktaş
- 2013–2014: Pamukkale Üniversitesi
- 2015–2016: Bursaspor

Mehmet Ali Yatağan (born 30 April 1993) is a Turkish professional basketball player who last played for Bursaspor of the Turkish Basketball First League.
