= İcikli, Baklan =

Village in Turkey

İcikli
- Neighbourhood
- Location in Turkey İcikli (Turkey Aegean)
- Coordinates: 38°03′16″N 29°33′43″E
- Country: Turkey
- Province: Denizli
- District: Baklan
- Population (2022): 221
- Time zone: UTC+3 (TRT)

İcikli is a neighbourhood in the municipality and district of Baklan, Denizli Province in Turkey. Its population is 221 (2022).
