= Deşdemir, Bekilli =

Village in Turkey

Deşdemir
- Neighbourhood
- Location in Turkey Deşdemir (Turkey Aegean)
- Coordinates: 38°16′N 29°22′E
- Country: Turkey
- Province: Denizli
- District: Bekilli
- Population (2022): 196
- Time zone: UTC+3 (TRT)

Deşdemir is a neighbourhood in the municipality and district of Bekilli, Denizli Province in Turkey. Its population is 196 (2022).
