= Armutalanı, Bozkurt =

Village in Turkey

Armutalanı
- Neighbourhood
- Location in Turkey Armutalanı (Turkey Aegean)
- Coordinates: 37.8957°N 29.6026°E
- Country: Turkey
- Province: Denizli
- District: Bozkurt
- Population (2022): 63
- Time zone: UTC+3 (TRT)

Armutalanı is a neighbourhood in the municipality and district of Bozkurt, Denizli Province in Turkey. Its population is 63 (2022).
