= Ömerli Dam =

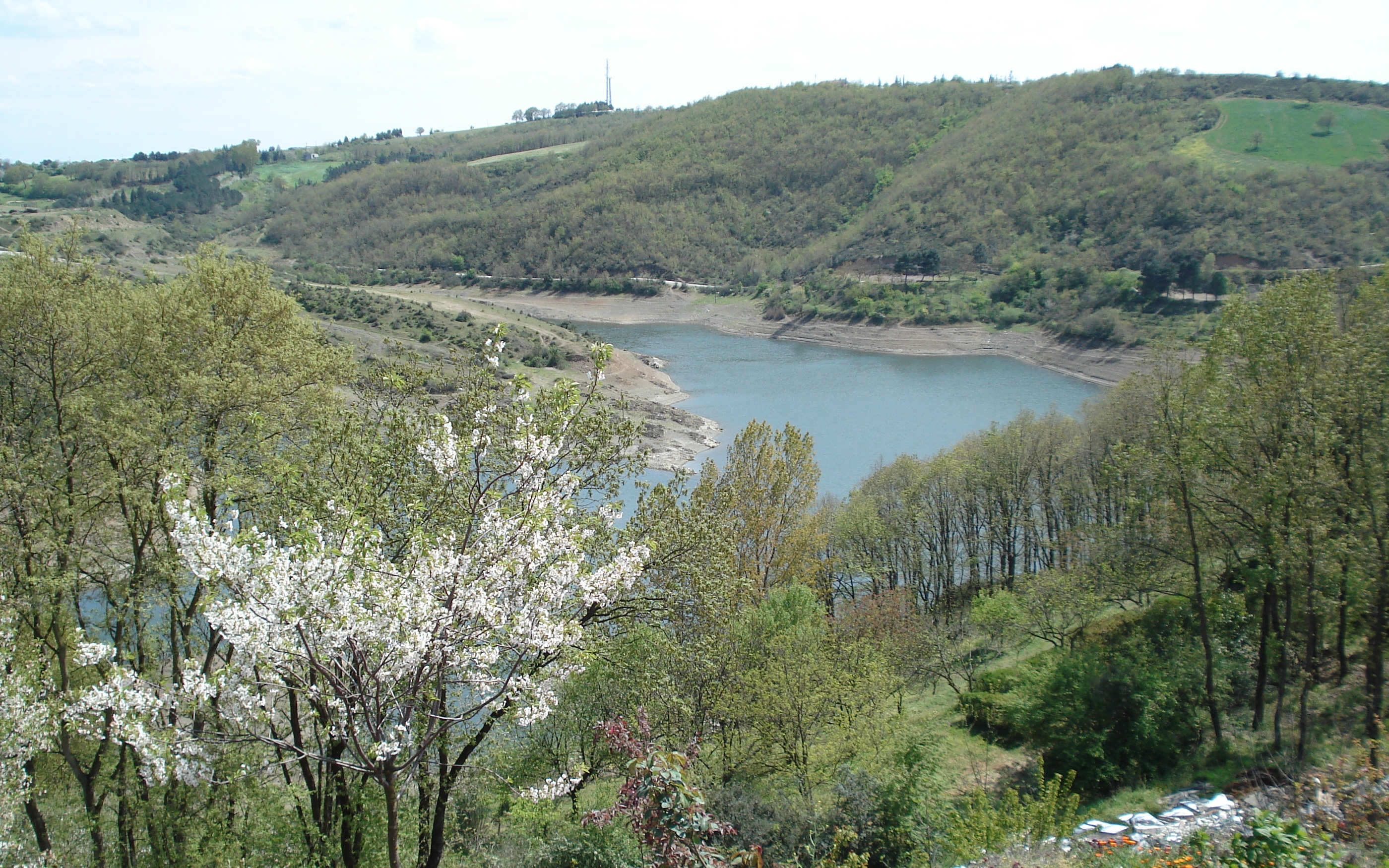

- Location within Istanbul
- Official name: Ömerli Barajı
- Country: Turkey
- Coordinates: 41.0609°N 29.358°E
- Purpose: Tap water
- Status: Operational
- Construction began: 1968
- Opening date: 1973

Dam and spillways
- Type of dam: Earth fill dam
- Impounds: Riva Creek
- Height (thalweg): 52 m (171 ft)
- Dam volume: 2,200 dam^{3} (78,000,000 cu ft)

Reservoir
- Creates: Lake Ömerli
- Total capacity: 386 nm^{3} (1.36×10^{−23} cu ft)
- Surface area: 23 km^{2} (8.9 sq mi)

Ömerli Dam (Turkish: Ömerli Barajı) is a rock-fill dam in Istanbul Province, Turkey.

Ömerli Dam is located in Çekmeköy district of Istanbul Province. The rock-fill dam was built by the Turkish State Hydraulic Works on the Riva Creek to provide tap water for the city. Construction started in 1968, and the dam went in service in 1973.

The volume of the earth mass used in the dam is 2,200 dam^{3} (78,000,000 cu ft). The dam has a thalweg height of 52 m (171 ft). It forms the reservoir Lake Ömerli (Turkish: Ömerli Gölü), which has a surface of 23 km^{2} (8.9 sq mi) and water capacity of 386 nm^{3} (1.36×10^{−23} cu ft).

In 1999, a sanitation project was launched to protect the reservoir from waste water pollution. In the time span of the last twenty years after the construction of the dam, the surrounding area saw a rapid urbanization that brought the risk of pollution of the reservoir. The project foresaw the collection of waste water by collectors and treatment in sewage plants before emptying into the sea.

== See also ==
- List of dams and reservoirs in Turkey
