= Bozkurt, Denizli =

Bozkurt
- District and municipality
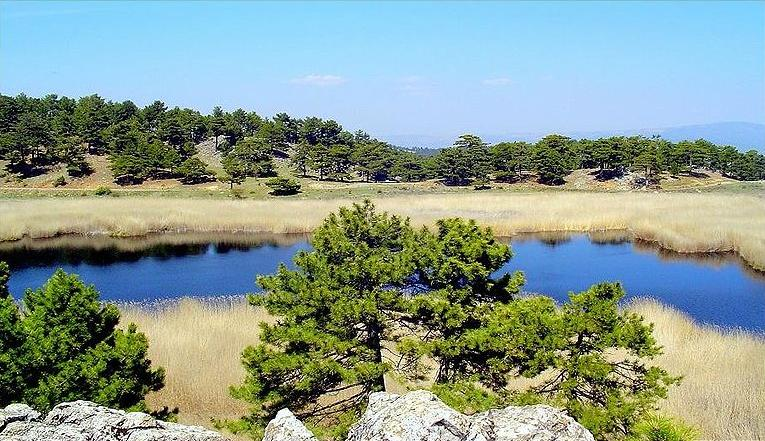
- One of the crater lakes in Karagöl near Bozkurt

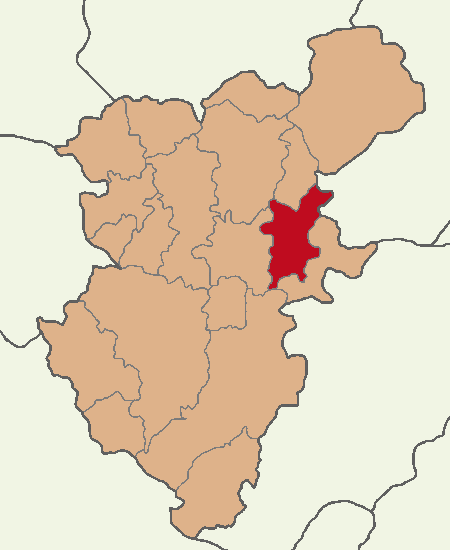
- Map showing Bozkurt District in Denizli Province

- Location within Turkey Location within Turkey Aegean
- Coordinates: 37°49′N 29°37′E
- Country: Turkey
- Province: Denizli

Government
  - Mayor: Birsen Çelik (CHP)
- Area: 462 km^{2} (178 sq mi)
- Elevation: 867 m (2,844 ft)
- Time zone: UTC+3 (TRT)
- Area code: 0258
- Website: denizlibozkurt.bel.tr

Bozkurt is a municipality and district of Denizli Province, Turkey. Its area is 462 km^{2}, The town is situated on a plain 52 km (32 mi) east of the city of Denizli. The altitude of the town is 867 m. It is quite close to the Lake Acıgöl and the neighboring town of Çardak and İnceler Kasabası

This is high country inland from the Aegean and Mediterranean, and has hot, dry summers and cold, wet winters.

During the Russo-Turkish War (1877–1878) refugees from Bulgaria were settled on the plain, which was then known as Hanabat after a Seljuk Turkish caravanserai that stands within the boundaries of the present-day neighboring district of Çardak. Immigration from Bulgaria continued until recent times.

This is an agricultural district, with irrigation systems currently being constructed.

Karagöl, literally "the black lake", is situated on top of the mountain on the slopes of which the town of Bozkurt is located. Karagöl is at an altitude of 1,250m and is an area of dense forests centered on several small crater lakes which are also fed by streams.

== Composition ==
There are 20 neighbourhoods in Bozkurt District:

- Alikurt
- Armutalanı
- Avdan
- Baklankuyucak
- Barbaros
- Başçeşme
- Çambaşı
- Cumalı
- Fatih
- Hamidiye
- Hayrettinköy
- İnceler
- İncelertekkesi
- Mahmudiye
- Mecidiye
- Mehmetcik
- Mimar Sinan
- Sazköy
- Tutluca
- Yenibağlar
