= Irgıllı, Çivril =

Village in Turkey

Irgıllı
- Neighbourhood
- Location in Turkey Irgıllı (Turkey Aegean)
- Coordinates: 38°10′N 29°55′E
- Country: Turkey
- Province: Denizli
- District: Çivril
- Population (2022): 2,090
- Time zone: UTC+3 (TRT)

Irgıllı is a neighbourhood of the municipality and district of Çivril, Denizli Province, Turkey. Its population is 2,090 (2022). Before the 2013 reorganisation, it was a town (belde).
