= Çandır, Çivril =

Village in Turkey

Çandır
- Neighbourhood
- Location in Turkey Çandır (Turkey Aegean)
- Coordinates: 38.1927°N 29.9908°E
- Country: Turkey
- Province: Denizli
- District: Çivril
- Population (2022): 128
- Time zone: UTC+3 (TRT)

Çandır is a neighbourhood in the municipality and district of Çivril, Denizli Province in Turkey. Its population is 128 (2022).
