= Çataloba, Baklan =

Village in Turkey

Çataloba
- Neighbourhood
- Location in Turkey Çataloba (Turkey Aegean)
- Coordinates: 37°55′53″N 29°31′57″E
- Country: Turkey
- Province: Denizli
- District: Baklan
- Population (2022): 258
- Time zone: UTC+3 (TRT)

Çataloba is a neighbourhood in the municipality and district of Baklan, Denizli Province in Turkey. Its population is 258 (2022).
