= Galini, Cyprus =

Galini: Γαληνή (Greek); Ömerli (Turkish)
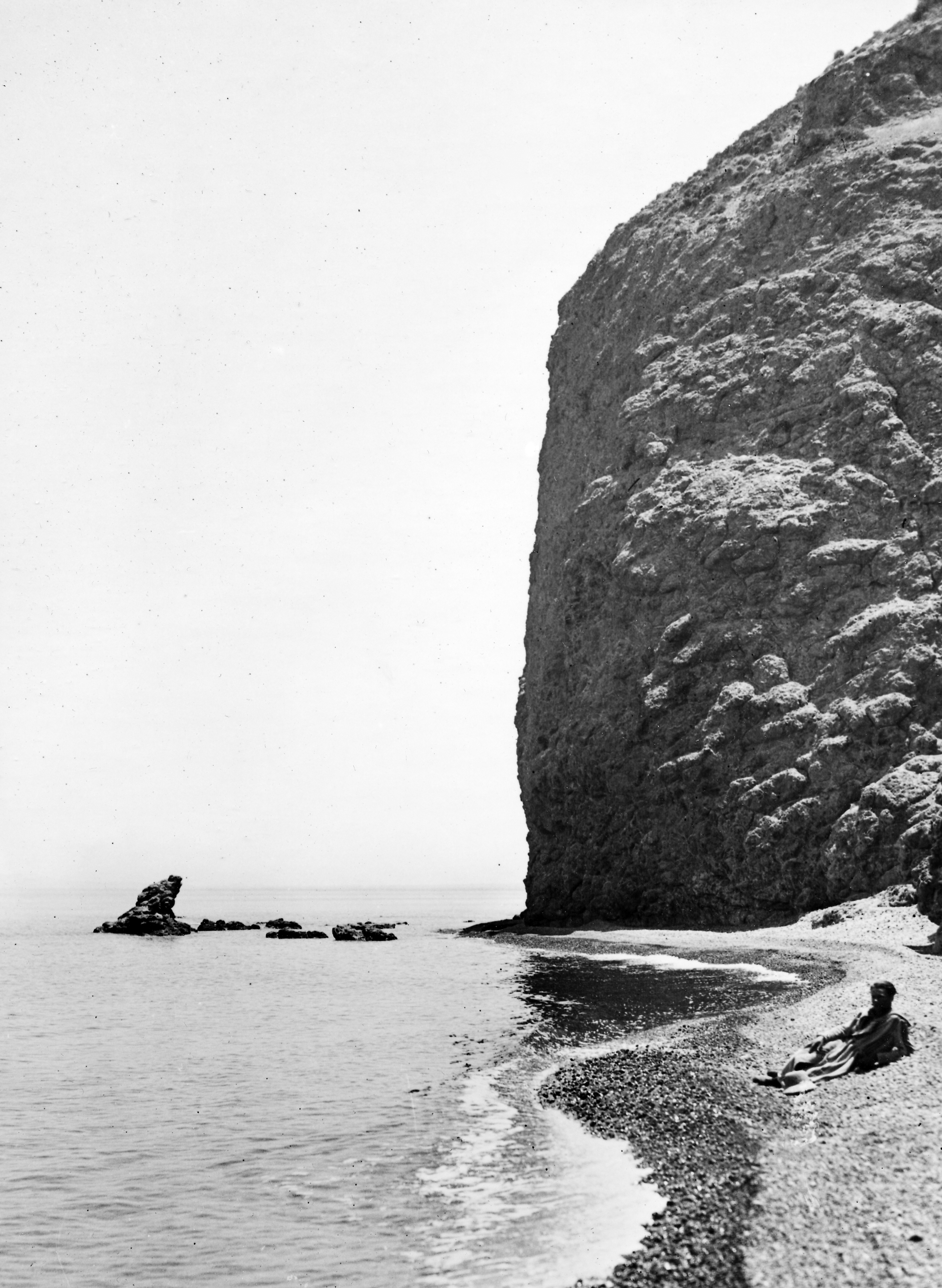

- Location within Cyprus
- Coordinates: 35°08′10″N 32°46′02″E
- Country (de jure): Cyprus
  - District: Nicosia District
- Country (de facto): Northern Cyprus
  - District: Lefke District
- Time zone: UTC+2 (EET)
  - Summer (DST): UTC+3 (EEST)

Galini (Greek: Γαληνή; Turkish: Ömerli) is a deserted village in Cyprus, 8 kilometres (5.0 mi) north-west of Lefka in the Morphou Bay area. It is under the de facto control of Northern Cyprus.

== History ==
In the census of 1960, Galini had an exclusively Greek Cypriot population of 1,295.

Galini had a church dedicated to St. John the Theologian and five chapels. The chapels belong to St. Barbara, St. Nikolas, St. Kournoutos, St. Mavra and St. Eleftherios.

Galini was occupied by the Turkish army on 4 September 1974, after a sudden attack. Six people were reported missing.

The village was renamed Ömerli (literally, "with Omer") in 1975 by the Turkish Cypriots.
