= Alikurt, Bozkurt =

Village in Turkey

Alikurt
- Neighbourhood
- Location in Turkey Alikurt (Turkey Aegean)
- Coordinates: 37.8421°N 29.4591°E
- Country: Turkey
- Province: Denizli
- District: Bozkurt
- Population (2022): 530
- Time zone: UTC+3 (TRT)

Alikurt is a neighbourhood in the municipality and district of Bozkurt, Denizli Province in Turkey. Its population is 530 (2022).
