= Bükrüce, Bekilli =

Village in Turkey

Bükrüce
- Neighbourhood
- Location in Turkey Bükrüce (Turkey Aegean)
- Coordinates: 38°13′N 29°29′E
- Country: Turkey
- Province: Denizli
- District: Bekilli
- Population (2022): 183
- Time zone: UTC+3 (TRT)

Bükrüce is a neighbourhood in the municipality and district of Bekilli, Denizli Province in Turkey. Its population is 183 (2022).
