= Beydilli, Çivril =

Village in Turkey

Beydilli
- Neighbourhood
- Location in Turkey Beydilli (Turkey Aegean)
- Coordinates: 38.2729°N 29.9221°E
- Country: Turkey
- Province: Denizli
- District: Çivril
- Population (2022): 483
- Time zone: UTC+3 (TRT)

Beydilli is a neighbourhood in the municipality and district of Çivril, Denizli Province in Turkey. Its population is 483 (2022).
