= Başçeşme, Bozkurt =

Village in Turkey

Başçeşme
- Neighbourhood
- Location in Turkey Başçeşme (Turkey Aegean)
- Coordinates: 37.8343°N 29.5491°E
- Country: Turkey
- Province: Denizli
- District: Bozkurt
- Population (2022): 149
- Time zone: UTC+3 (TRT)

Başçeşme is a neighbourhood in the municipality and district of Bozkurt, Denizli Province in Turkey. Its population is 149 (2022).
