= Çıtak, Çivril =

Village in Turkey

Çıtak
- Neighbourhood
- Location in Turkey Çıtak (Turkey Aegean)
- Coordinates: 38°8′8″N 29°38′49″E
- Country: Turkey
- Province: Denizli
- District: Çivril
- Population (2022): 3,095
- Time zone: UTC+3 (TRT)

Çıtak is a neighbourhood of the municipality and district of Çivril, Denizli Province, Turkey. Its population is 3,095 (2022). Before the 2013 reorganisation, it was a town (belde).
