= Çamköy, Bekilli =

Village in Turkey

Çamköy
- Neighbourhood
- Location in Turkey Çamköy (Turkey Aegean)
- Coordinates: 38°17′55″N 29°22′54″E
- Country: Turkey
- Province: Denizli
- District: Bekilli
- Population (2022): 107
- Time zone: UTC+3 (TRT)

Çamköy is a neighbourhood in the municipality and district of Bekilli, Denizli Province in Turkey. Its population is 107 (2022).
