= Ebru Bozdağ =

Turkish computational seismologist

Hatice Ebru Bozdağ (born 1979) is a Turkish computational seismologist and planetary scientist whose research involves the use of adjoint tomography to reconstruct the global structure of the Earth and Mars from seismic recordings. She is an associate professor at the Colorado School of Mines, with a joint appointment in the Department of Applied Mathematics & Statistics and the Department of Geophysics.

== Education and career ==
Bozdağ was born in 1979 in Artvin. She studied geophysics at Istanbul Technical University, earning a bachelor's degree in 2000 and a master's degree in 2002. She completed a Ph.D. in geophysics in 2009 at Utrecht University in the Netherlands. Her doctoral dissertation, Assessing and improving seismic tomography models using 3-D numerical simulations, was supervised by Jeannot Trampert.

After postdoctoral research at Princeton University she took a position as chaire d’excellence and tenured associate professor at Côte d'Azur University in France in 2013, continuing to hold the position until 2023. Meanwhile, in 2017, she moved to the Colorado School of Mines as an assistant professor and in 2022 was promoted to associate professor.
