= Konak, Baklan =

Village in Turkey

Konak
- Neighbourhood
- Location in Turkey Konak (Turkey Aegean)
- Coordinates: 38°02′25″N 29°35′12″E
- Country: Turkey
- Province: Denizli
- District: Baklan
- Population (2022): 339
- Time zone: UTC+3 (TRT)

Konak is a neighbourhood in the municipality and district of Baklan, Denizli Province in Turkey. Its population is 339 (2022).
