= Poyrazlı, Bekilli =

Village in Turkey

Poyrazlı
- Neighbourhood
- Country: Turkey
- Province: Denizli
- District: Bekilli
- Population (2022): 297
- Time zone: UTC+3 (TRT)

Poyrazlı is a neighbourhood in the municipality and district of Bekilli, Denizli Province in Turkey. Its population is 297 (2022).
