= Üçkuyu, Bekilli =

Village in Turkey

Üçkuyu
- Neighbourhood
- Country: Turkey
- Province: Denizli
- District: Bekilli
- Population (2022): 300
- Time zone: UTC+3 (TRT)

Üçkuyu is a neighbourhood in the municipality and district of Bekilli, Denizli Province in Turkey. Its population is 300 (2022).
