= Cumalar, Çivril =

Village in Turkey

Cumalar
- Neighbourhood
- Location in Turkey Cumalar (Turkey Aegean)
- Coordinates: 38.324°N 29.894°E
- Country: Turkey
- Province: Denizli
- District: Çivril
- Population (2022): 92
- Time zone: UTC+3 (TRT)

Cumalar is a neighbourhood in the municipality and district of Çivril, Denizli Province in Turkey. Its population is 92 (2022).
