= Yatağan, Denizli =

Town in Denizli Province, Turkey

Yatağan
- Neighbourhood
- Location in Turkey Yatağan (Turkey Aegean)
- Coordinates: 37°34′1″N 29°22′23″E
- Country: Turkey
- Province: Denizli
- District: Serinhisar
- Population (2022): 2,534
- Time zone: UTC+3 (TRT)

Yatağan is a neighbourhood of the municipality and district of Serinhisar, Denizli Province, Turkey. Its population is 2,534 (2022). Before the 2013 reorganisation, it was a town (belde).

== Climate ==
Yatağan has a hot-summer Mediterranean climate (Köppen: Csa), with very hot, dry summers, and cool, rainy winters.

Climate data for Yatağan (1991–2020)
Month	Jan	Feb	Mar	Apr	May	Jun	Jul	Aug	Sep	Oct	Nov	Dec	Year
Mean daily maximum °C (°F)	12.3 (54.1)	13.7 (56.7)	17.1 (62.8)	21.6 (70.9)	27.2 (81.0)	32.6 (90.7)	36.5 (97.7)	36.7 (98.1)	32.1 (89.8)	26.0 (78.8)	19.3 (66.7)	13.5 (56.3)	24.1 (75.4)
Daily mean °C (°F)	6.7 (44.1)	7.8 (46.0)	10.5 (50.9)	14.3 (57.7)	19.2 (66.6)	24.4 (75.9)	27.9 (82.2)	27.7 (81.9)	23.0 (73.4)	17.6 (63.7)	11.9 (53.4)	7.9 (46.2)	16.6 (61.9)
Mean daily minimum °C (°F)	2.4 (36.3)	3.1 (37.6)	4.7 (40.5)	7.7 (45.9)	11.7 (53.1)	16.0 (60.8)	19.0 (66.2)	19.0 (66.2)	14.7 (58.5)	10.6 (51.1)	6.2 (43.2)	3.8 (38.8)	9.9 (49.8)
Average precipitation mm (inches)	113.71 (4.48)	87.54 (3.45)	72.98 (2.87)	51.79 (2.04)	42.12 (1.66)	15.33 (0.60)	11.98 (0.47)	6.26 (0.25)	16.52 (0.65)	43.95 (1.73)	78.8 (3.10)	112.19 (4.42)	653.17 (25.72)
Average precipitation days (≥ 1.0 mm)	9.6	8.2	7.4	6.5	5.4	3.1	2.5	2.1	2.6	4.2	6.0	9.4	67
Average relative humidity (%)	74.7	70.7	66.2	62.8	58.1	49.3	43.1	45.4	50.9	61.9	70.4	76.9	60.8
Source: NOAA
