= Beyağaç =

- District and municipality
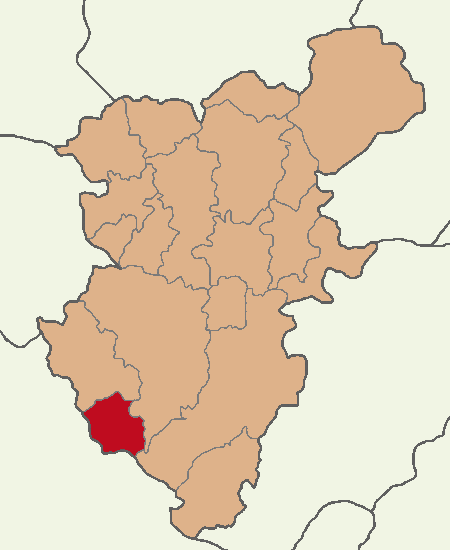
- Map showing Beyağaç District in Denizli Province

- Location in Turkey Beyağaç (Turkey Aegean)
- Coordinates: 37°13′19.85″N 28°54′33.14″E
- Country: Turkey
- Province: Denizli

Government
  - Mayor: Sezayi Pütün (YRP)
- Area: 333 km^{2} (129 sq mi)
- Population (2022): 6,197
  - Density: 18.6/km^{2} (48.2/sq mi)
- Time zone: UTC+3 (TRT)
- Postal code: 20590
- Area code: 0258
- Website: www.beyagac.bel.tr

Beyağaç is a municipality and district of Denizli Province, Turkey. Its area is 333 km^{2} (129 sq mi), and its population is 6,197 (2022). Beyağaç district area neighbors those of three other districts of Denizli Province from the north-west to the south-east, namely Kale, Tavas and Acıpayam and the central district and Köyceğiz district of Muğla Province to its west. It is closer to the neighboring provincial seat of Muğla than its own. Among the districts of Denizli Province as a whole, Beyağaç is the one which is the closest to the Turkish Riviera coastline, along its Marmaris, Köyceğiz and Fethiye axis.

The district center first came into existence as a large village with the fusion in 1996 of two neighboring villages, Eskere and Sarıyer, under the name Beyağaç (meaning 'gentleman's tree'). Beyağaç was made into a municipality in 1972, and was under Kale as its district center and became a district center of its own in the year 1991. The present name Beyağaç literally means 'the venerable tree', a reference to ancient black pine forests that surround the town and which are under protection. Beyağaç has seven depending villages.

The district is renowned for its extremely rich flora, with a number of endemic species.

A notable sight of interest in Beyağaç is Lake Kartal Glacier Valley, accessible by jeeps leaving from Beyağaç town center and by following a 40 km (25 mi) country road along forests. The altitude of the valley starts from 2261 m at Ulugöl Peak, one of the summits of the Mount Sandıras, the dominating mountainous mass of the district. The valley inclines gradually during its 1.5 km (0.9 mi) length and its width varies between 500–700 metres (1,600–2,300 ft), bordered by steep cliffs. It is sprinkled with 250- to 700-year-old black pine trees and is marked at a 1,900 m (6,200 ft) altitude by Lake Kartal, which gives its name to the valley. The valley is of astounding beauty and is a protected natural site since 1990.

Further to the valley and nearer to Beyağaç, (21 km (13 mi) distance) are the areas of other protected sites such as Topuklu plain and Çiçekbaba peak, with some of the trees here being even older.

== Composition ==
There are 15 neighbourhoods in Beyağaç District:

- Çamlık
- Cumhuriyet
- Eşenler
- Fatih
- Geriçam
- Hürriyet
- Kapuz
- Kızılcaağaç
- Pınarönü
- Sazak
- Subaşı
- Uzunoluk
- Yeniçeşme
- Yenimahalle
- Zafer
