= Çakallar, Çivril =

Village in Turkey

Çakallar
- Neighbourhood
- Location in Turkey Çakallar (Turkey Aegean)
- Coordinates: 38.3655°N 29.8433°E
- Country: Turkey
- Province: Denizli
- District: Çivril
- Population (2022): 43
- Time zone: UTC+3 (TRT)

Çakallar is a neighbourhood in the municipality and district of Çivril, Denizli Province in Turkey. Its population is 43 (2022).
