= Uzunoluk, Beyağaç =

Village in Turkey

Uzunoluk
- Neighbourhood
- Location in Turkey Uzunoluk (Turkey Aegean)
- Coordinates: 37°13′44″N 28°56′49″E
- Country: Turkey
- Province: Denizli
- District: Beyağaç
- Population (2022): 770
- Time zone: UTC+3 (TRT)

Uzunoluk is a neighbourhood in the municipality and district of Beyağaç, Denizli Province in Turkey. Its population is 770 (2022).
