= Belence, Çivril =

Village in Turkey

Belence
- Neighbourhood
- Location in Turkey Belence (Turkey Aegean)
- Coordinates: 38.4137°N 29.8408°E
- Country: Turkey
- Province: Denizli
- District: Çivril
- Population (2022): 195
- Time zone: UTC+3 (TRT)

Belence is a neighbourhood in the municipality and district of Çivril, Denizli Province in Turkey. Its population is 195 (2022).
