= Bozdağ, Çivril =

Village in Turkey

Bozdağ
- Neighbourhood
- Location in Turkey Bozdağ (Turkey Aegean)
- Coordinates: 38.0991°N 29.8265°E
- Country: Turkey
- Province: Denizli
- District: Çivril
- Population (2022): 139
- Time zone: UTC+3 (TRT)

Bozdağ is a neighbourhood in the municipality and district of Çivril, Denizli Province in Turkey. Its population is 139 (2022).
