= Işıklı, Çivril =

Village in Turkey

Işıklı
- Neighbourhood
- Location in Turkey Işıklı (Turkey Aegean)
- Coordinates: 38°19′19″N 29°50′46″E
- Country: Turkey
- Province: Denizli
- District: Çivril
- Population (2022): 1,563
- Time zone: UTC+3 (TRT)

Işıklı is a neighbourhood of the municipality and district of Çivril, Denizli Province, Turkey. Its population is 1,563 (2022). Before the 2013 reorganisation, it was a town (belde).
