= Beyköy, Çivril =

Village in Turkey

Beyköy
- Neighbourhood
- Location in Turkey Beyköy (Turkey Aegean)
- Coordinates: 38.1813°N 29.8891°E
- Country: Turkey
- Province: Denizli
- District: Çivril
- Population (2022): 282
- Time zone: UTC+3 (TRT)

Beyköy is a neighbourhood in the municipality and district of Çivril, Denizli Province in Turkey. Its population is 282 (2022).
