= Tuğlu, Çivril =

Village in Turkey

Tuğlu
- Neighbourhood
- Country: Turkey
- Province: Denizli
- District: Çivril
- Population (2022): 200
- Time zone: UTC+3 (TRT)

Tuğlu is a neighbourhood in the municipality and district of Çivril, Denizli Province in Turkey. Its population is 200 (2022).
