= Caber, Çivril =

Village in Turkey

Cabar
- Neighbourhood
- Location in Turkey Cabar (Turkey Aegean)
- Coordinates: 38.3971°N 29.7384°E
- Country: Turkey
- Province: Denizli
- District: Çivril
- Population (2022): 318
- Time zone: UTC+3 (TRT)

Cabar is a neighbourhood in the municipality and district of Çivril, Denizli Province in Turkey. Its population is 318 (2022).
