= Emircik, Çivril =

Village in Turkey

Emircik
- Neighbourhood
- Location in Turkey Emircik (Turkey Aegean)
- Coordinates: 38°17′24″N 29°47′40″E
- Country: Turkey
- Province: Denizli
- District: Çivril
- Population (2022): 919
- Time zone: UTC+3 (TRT)

Emircik is a neighbourhood of the municipality and district of Çivril, Denizli Province, Turkey. Its population is 919 (2022). It was part of the town (belde) Emirhisar, which was merged into Çivril at the 2013 reorganisation.
