= Süngülü, Çivril =

Village in Turkey

Süngülü
- Neighbourhood
- Country: Turkey
- Province: Denizli
- District: Çivril
- Population (2022): 400
- Time zone: UTC+3 (TRT)

Süngülü is a neighbourhood in the municipality and district of Çivril, Denizli Province in Turkey. Its population is 400 (2022).
