= Çivril =

- District and municipality
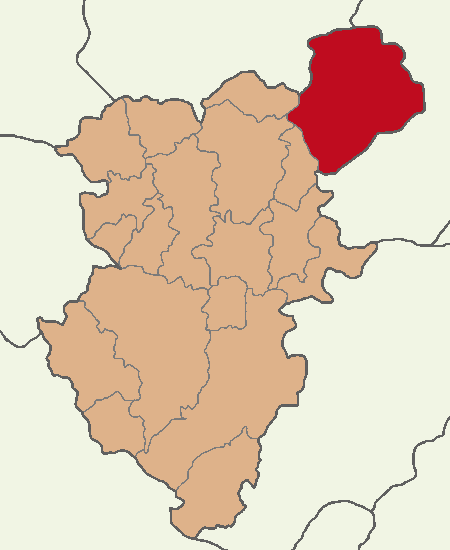
- Map showing Çivril District in Denizli Province

- Location in Turkey Çivril (Turkey Aegean)
- Coordinates: 38°18′5″N 29°44′19″E
- Country: Turkey
- Province: Denizli

Government
  - Mayor: Semih Dere (CHP)
- Area: 1,570 km^{2} (610 sq mi)
- Elevation: 941 m (3,087 ft)
- Population (2022): 59,967
  - Density: 38.2/km^{2} (98.9/sq mi)
- Time zone: UTC+3 (TRT)
- Area code: 0258
- Website: www.civril.bel.tr

Çivril (Turkish: [ˈtʃivɾil]) is a municipality and district of Denizli Province, Turkey. Its area is 1,570 km^{2}, and its population is 59,967 (2022). Çivril district area neighbors those of two districts of Uşak Province to its north, namely Sivaslı and Karahallı, and four districts of Afyonkarahisar Province from the north-east to the south which are, clockwise, Sandıklı, Dinar, Dazkırı and Dazkırı, and to its south-west, three districts of the same province as itself depending Denizli. These last three are Bekilli, Çal and Baklan.

It is the third-most populated district of the province after Merkezefendi and Pamukkale and is situated on a plain to the northeast of the city of Denizli, being actually closer to the neighboring provincial seat of Uşak.

== General features ==
The weather is dry and hot in summer, cold in winter. The main industry in the area is growing apples. In the 1960s, many migrated to work in Germany, USA and other European countries, meaning Çivril has a number of wealthy citizens living abroad or in Istanbul and in summer is populated with returning families for holiday.

== History ==
=== Beycehöyük ===
During an excavation carried out by the British archaeologists Prof. Seton Lloyd and Prof. James Mellaart between 1953 and 1959 at Beycehöyük, 6 km (4 mi) south of the town of Çivril, several artefacts dating back to the Copper Age (circa 3000 BC) were found. It is assumed that Beycehöyük was the centre of the Arzawa kingdom, contemporaries of the Hittite Empire. Later on Phrygians, Carians, Lydians, Persians and Macedonians passed through the region during recorded history but left very few traces.

It is assumed that the relics of raiders and chariots in mounds and on rocks found at Yavuzca farm, 20 km (12 mi) from Çivril, date back to the Phrygians in whose time the most notable settlement here was called Eumeneia. A tomb located on Beycehöyük dates from Seljuk era.

=== Turkish era ===
A village in Hüdavendigâr vilayet depending from Sandıklı until the 1880s, Çivril gained importance once it became the terminus of a branch of the İzmir-Dinar railway which reached here in 1889. The railway was later extended from Dinar further east to Eğirdir in 1912. Çivril continued to grow by becoming a township with its own municipality in 1892 and a district center in 1910, attached at first to Afyonkarahisar and to Denizli after 1925. The railway line was closed in 1988 and the transportation relies today on intercity buses.

== Composition ==
There are 77 neighbourhoods in Çivril District:

- Akçaköy
- Akpınar
- Aktaş
- Aşağı
- Balçıkhisar
- Bayat
- Bekirli
- Belence
- Beydilli
- Beyköy
- Bozdağ
- Bucak
- Bulgurlar
- Caber
- Çağlayan
- Çakallar
- Çandır
- Çapak
- Çarşı
- Çatlar
- Çayır
- Çetinler
- Çıtak
- Cumalar
- Düzbel
- Emircik
- Gökgöl
- Gümüşsu
- Gürpınar
- Hamam
- Haydan
- İğdir
- İmrallı
- İnceköy
- Irgıllı
- İshaklı
- Işıklı
- Karabedirler
- Karahacılı
- Karalar
- Karamanlı
- Karayahşılar
- Kavakalanı
- Kavakköy
- Kıralan
- Kızılcasöğüt
- Kızılcayar
- Koçak
- Kocayaka
- Menteş
- Ömerli
- Osmanköy
- Özdemirci
- Reşadiye
- Saray
- Sarıbeyli
- Sarılar
- Savran
- Şehitler
- Şenköy
- Seraserli
- Sökmen
- Somak
- Stadyum
- Sundurlu
- Süngülü
- Tekkeköy
- Tokça
- Tuğlu
- Yahyalı
- Yakacık
- Yalınlı
- Yamanlar
- Yassıhüyük
- Yukarı
- Yukarıçapak
- Yuvaköy

== Lake Işıklı ==
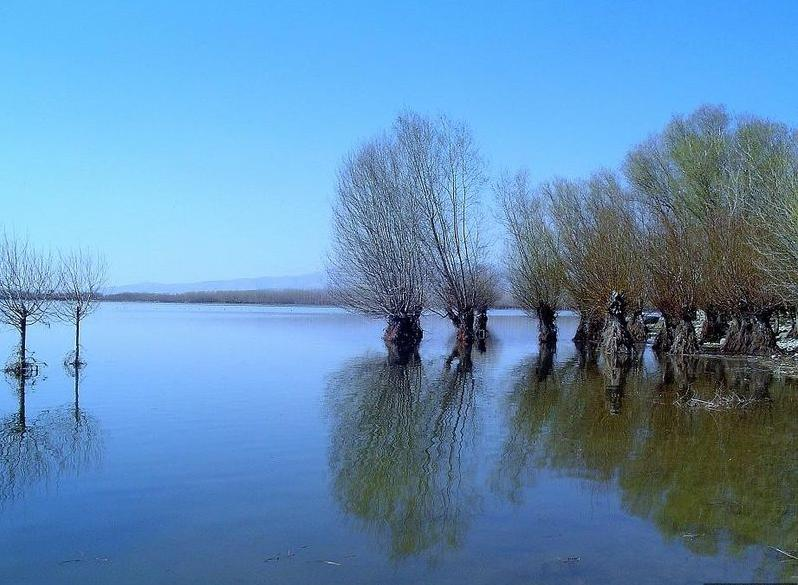
Lake Işıklı

Lake Işıklı is a large, freshwater lake which is a fishing reserve and recreational are for its region, aside from being one of the sources of Büyük Menderes River. The lake lies at an altitude of 821 m and its area is 73 square kilometres. Its waters are also used for irrigation for the surrounding agricultural lands. It is a site for breeding waterbirds and large numbers of wintering wildfowl. It has been assessed as an Important Bird Area.

The lake is at about 20 km (12 mi) south of Çivril and extends in Çivril Plain. It is fed by streams from further east. Another stream, Işıklı Stream, in its turn, departs from the lake to join later Büyük Menderes River.

== Other places of interest ==
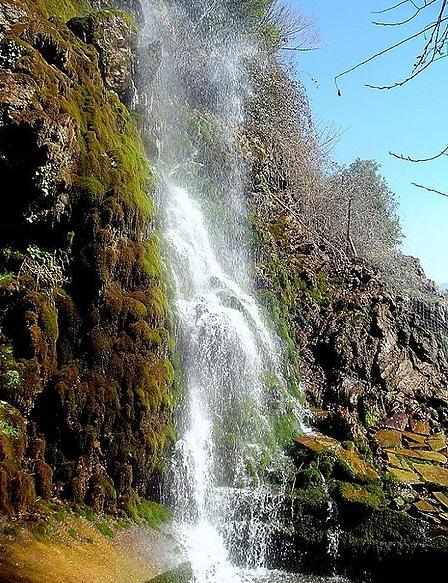
Gümüşsu Waterfalls near Çivril

The ancient and as yet superficially explored city of Eumeneia is located on the shore of Lake Işıklı near Çivril and the locality is arranged into a recreational area.

There are a number of waterfalls on Işıklı Stream between Lake Işıklı and Büyük Menderes River, including the Gümüşsu falls.

To the north of the district center is the township of Gürpınar, which was previously known as Bulkaz. Another waterfall is located practically within the township.
