= Akçaköy, Çivril =

Village in Turkey

Akçaköy
- Neighbourhood
- Location in Turkey Akçaköy (Turkey Aegean)
- Coordinates: 38.244°N 29.714°E
- Country: Turkey
- Province: Denizli
- District: Çivril
- Population (2022): 91
- Time zone: UTC+3 (TRT)

Akçaköy is a neighbourhood in the municipality and district of Çivril, Denizli Province in Turkey. Its population is 91 (2022).

== History ==
The former name of the village was Melhuş.
