= Kızılcaağaç, Beyağaç =

Village in Turkey

Kızılcaağaç
- Neighbourhood
- Country: Turkey
- Province: Denizli
- District: Beyağaç
- Population (2022): 644
- Time zone: UTC+3 (TRT)

Kızılcaağaç is a neighbourhood in the municipality and district of Beyağaç, Denizli Province in Turkey. Its population is 644 (2022).
