= Bekirli, Çivril =

Village in Turkey

Bekirli
- Neighbourhood
- Location in Turkey Bekirli (Turkey Aegean)
- Coordinates: 38.1931°N 29.7810°E
- Country: Turkey
- Province: Denizli
- District: Çivril
- Population (2022): 95
- Time zone: UTC+3 (TRT)

Bekirli is a neighbourhood in the municipality and district of Çivril, Denizli Province in Turkey. Its population is 95 (2022).
