= Yuvaköy, Çivril =

Village in Turkey

Yuvaköy
- Neighbourhood
- Location in Turkey Yuvaköy (Turkey Aegean)
- Coordinates: 38°18′40″N 29°54′31″E
- Country: Turkey
- Province: Denizli
- District: Çivril
- Population (2022): 342
- Time zone: UTC+3 (TRT)

Yuvaköy is a neighbourhood in the municipality and district of Çivril, Denizli Province in Turkey. Its population is 342 (2022).
