= List of municipalities in Denizli Province =

This is the List of municipalities in Denizli Province, Turkey as of October 2007.

== Municipalities ==
List is sorted alphabetically A-Z, as Districts->Municipalities.

District	Municipality
Acıpayam	Acıpayam
Acıpayam	Akalan
Acıpayam	Alaattin
Acıpayam	Darıveren
Acıpayam	Dedebağı
Acıpayam	Dodurgalar
Acıpayam	Gölcük
Acıpayam	Kelekçi
Acıpayam	Kumavşarı
Acıpayam	Yassıhüyük
Acıpayam	Yazır
Acıpayam	Yeşildere
Acıpayam	Yeşilyuva
Acıpayam	Yumrutaş
Akköy	Akköy
Akköy	Gölemezli
Babadağ	Babadağ
Baklan	Baklan
Baklan	Boğaziçi
Baklan	Dağal
Bekilli	Bekilli
Bekilli	Kutlubey
Beyağaç	Beyağaç
Bozkurt	Bozkurt
Bozkurt	İnceler
Buldan	Buldan
Buldan	Yenicekent
Çal	Akkent
Çal	Belevi
Çal	Çal
Çal	Denizler
Çal	Hançalar
Çal	İsabey
Çal	Ortaköy
Çal	Selcen
Çal	Süller
Çameli	Çameli
Çardak	Beylerli
Çardak	Çardak
Çardak	Gemiş
Çivril	Çıtak
Çivril	Çivril
Çivril	Emirhisar
Çivril	Gümüşsu
Çivril	Gürpınar
Çivril	Irgıllı
Çivril	Işıklı
Çivril	Kıralan
Çivril	Kızılcasöğüt
Çivril	Özdemirci
Denizli (Merkez)	Akkale
Denizli	Aşağışamlı
Denizli	Bağbaşı
Denizli	Başkarcı
Denizli	Bereketli
Denizli	Cankurtaran
Denizli	Denizli
Denizli	Gökpınar
Denizli	Göveçlik
Denizli	Gözler
Denizli	Gümüşler
Denizli	Hallaçlar
Denizli	Irlaganlı
Denizli	Karahayıt
Denizli	Kayıhan
Denizli	Kınıklı
Denizli	Korucuk
Denizli	Pamukkale
Denizli	Pınarkent
Denizli	Servergazi
Denizli	Uzunpınar
Denizli	Üçler
Güney	Eziler
Güney	Güney
Honaz	Honaz
Honaz	Kaklık
Honaz	Karaçay
Honaz	Kızılyer
Honaz	Kocabaş
Kale	Gölbaşı
Kale	Kale
Kale	Karaköy
Sarayköy	Ahmetli
Sarayköy	Duacılı
Sarayköy	Sarayköy
Sarayköy	Sığma
Sarayköy	Tosunlar
Serinhisar	Serinhisar
Serinhisar	Yatağan
Tavas	Baharlar
Tavas	Çağırgan
Tavas	Garipköy
Tavas	Karahisar
Tavas	Kızılca
Tavas	Kızılcabölük
Tavas	Nikfer
Tavas	Pınarlar
Tavas	Solmaz
Tavas	Tavas
Tavas	Ulukent

== Changes in 2014 ==
According to Law act no. 6360, belde (town) municipalities within provinces with more than 750,000 population (so called Metropolitan municipalities) were abolished as of 30 March 2014. 68 belde municipalities in the above list are now defunct. The list is kept for historical reference.
