= Karakurt (disambiguation) =

Karakurt may refer to:

== Biology ==
- Latrodectus tredecimguttatus, a species of spider

== Media ==
- The Blacklist season 2 episode

== Military ==
- Karakurt-class corvette, used in the Russian Navy

== Places ==
- Karakurt, Ukraine
- Karakurt, Pamukkale, a locality in Turkey

== Sport ==
- Ebrar Karakurt (born 2000), Turkish volleyball player

== See also ==
- Qaraqurdlu, a locality in Azerbaijan
- Kurt Kara (born 1989), New Zealand footballer
