= Kilaraza =

Town of ancient Caria, during Roman time

Coordinates: 37°50′22″N 29°02′03″E

Kilaraza or Kilarazos was a town of ancient Caria, inhabited during Roman times. Its name does not occur among ancient authors, but is inferred from epigraphic and other evidence.

Its site is located near Hacieyüplü in the district of Merkezefendi, Denizli Province of Turkey.
