= Diocaesarea (disambiguation) =

Diocaesarea is a historic name for the town of Sepphoris in Israel.

Diocaesarea or Diocæsarea or Diocaesareia or Diokaisareia (Ancient Greek: Διοκαισάρεια) may also refer to:

- Diocaesarea (Cappadocia), a town of ancient Cappadocia
- Diocaesarea (Isauria), a town of ancient Cilicia Trachea, and later Isauria
- Diocaesarea a historic name of Anazarbus, now in Turkey
- Diocaesarea a historic name of Ceretapa, now in Turkey
