= Akşar =

Akşar can refer to these places in Turkey:

- Akşar, Acıpayam
- Akşar, Bayburt
- Akşar, Şenkaya

== See also ==
- Aksar, a 2006 Indian Hindi-language drama thriller film by Anant Mahadevan
  - Aksar 2, its 2017 sequel by Mahadevan
