= Oğuzköy =

Oğuzköy can refer to:

- Oğuzköy, Acıpayam
- Oğuzköy, Kemah
