= Suçatı =

Suçatı may refer to the following settlements in Turkey:

- Suçatı, Acıpayam, a neighbourhood in Denizli Province
- Suçatı, Dargeçit, a neighbourhood in Mardin Province
- Suçatı, Karlıova, a village in Bingöl Province
- Suçatı, Mut, a neighbourhood in Mersin Province
- Suçatı, Pazar, a village in Rize Province
