= Kelekçi =

Kelekçi can refer to:

- Kelekçi, Acıpayam
- Kelekçi, Dicle
