= Olukbaşı =

Olukbaşı can refer to the following villages in Turkey:

- Olukbaşı, Acıpayam
- Olukbaşı, Bozdoğan
- Olukbaşı, Taşköprü
