= Karayayla =

Karayayla can refer to:

- Karayayla, Kale
- Karayayla, Tarsus
