= Çamlarca =

Çamlarca can refer to:

- Çamlarca, Kale
- Çamlarca, Kozan
