= Altıntop =

Altıntop may refer to:

== People ==
- Halil Altıntop (born 1982), Turkish football player
- Hamit Altıntop (born 1982), Turkish football player

== Places ==
- Altıntop, Merkezefendi, a neighbourhood in Denizli Province, Turkey
- Altıntop, Doğanşehir, a neighbourhood in the municipality of Doğanşehir, Malatya Province, Turkey
