= Yenikonak =

Yenikonak can refer to:

- Yenikonak, Elâzığ
- Yenikonak, Güney
