= Kırca =

Kırca can refer to the following villages in Turkey:

- Kırca, Acıpayam
- Kırca, Ayvacık
- Kırca, Bigadiç
- Kırca, Gümüşhacıköy
- Kırca, Sultandağı
