= Kuyucak (disambiguation) =

Kuyucak can refer to:

- Kuyucak
- Kuyucak, Acıpayam
- Kuyucak, Burhaniye
- Kuyucak, Dodurga
- Kuyucak, Mecitözü
