= Esenkaya =

Esenkaya can refer to:

- Esenkaya, Kale
- Esenkaya, Mudurnu
