= Yenidere =

Yenidere can refer to:

- Yenidere Dam
- Yenidere, Kale
- Yenidere, Taşova
