= Gökçeören =

Gökçeören (literally "celestial ruins" or "blue ruins" in Turkish) may refer to the following places in Turkey:

- Gökçeören, Balıkesir, a village in the central district of Balıkesir, Balıkesir Province
- Gökçeören, Cide, a village in the district of Cide, Kastamonu Province
- Gökçeören, İzmit, a village in the central district of İzmit, Kocaeli Province
- Gökçeören, Kale
- Gökçeören, Kalecik, a village in the district of Kalecik, Ankara Province
- Gökçeören, Kaş, a village in the district of Kaş, Antalya Province
- Gökçeören, Kula, a town and municipality in the district of Kula, Manisa Province
- Gökçeören, Orta, a village in the district of Orta, Çankırı Province
- Gökçeören, Osmangazi, a village in the district of Osmangazi, Bursa Province
