= Karahüyük =

Karahüyük can refer to:

- Karahüyük (Elbistan), an archaeological site in Kahramanmaraş Province, Turkey
- Karahüyük, Acıpayam
- Karahüyük, Kalecik
