= Uçarı =

Uçarı may refer to the following places in Turkey:

- Uçarı, Acıpayam
- Uçarı, Anamur, a village in Anamur district of Mersin Province
- Uçarı, Kazan, a village and neighborhood in the district of Kazan, Ankara Province
