= Karataş, Sarayköy =

Village in Turkey

Karataş
- Neighbourhood
- Country: Turkey
- Province: Denizli
- District: Sarayköy
- Population (2022): 158
- Time zone: UTC+3 (TRT)

Karataş is a neighbourhood in the municipality and district of Sarayköy, Denizli Province in Turkey. Its population is 158 (2022).
