= Ortatepe, Kale =

Village in Turkey

Ortatepe
- Neighbourhood
- Country: Turkey
- Province: Denizli
- District: Kale
- Population (2022): 219
- Time zone: UTC+3 (TRT)

Ortatepe is a neighbourhood in the municipality and district of Kale, Denizli Province in Turkey. Its population is 219 (2022).
