= Gerzele, Merkezefendi =

Village in Turkey

Gerzele
- Neighbourhood
- Location in Turkey Gerzele (Turkey Aegean)
- Coordinates: 37.7456°N 29.0538°E
- Country: Turkey
- Province: Denizli
- District: Merkezefendi
- Population (2022): 14,395
- Time zone: UTC+3 (TRT)

Gerzele is a neighbourhood in the municipality and district of Merkezefendi, Denizli Province in Turkey. Its population is 14,395 (2022).
