= Irlıganlı, Pamukkale =

Village in Turkey

Irlıganlı
- Neighbourhood
- Location in Turkey Irlıganlı (Turkey Aegean)
- Coordinates: 37°52′51″N 29°10′52″E
- Country: Turkey
- Province: Denizli
- District: Pamukkale
- Population (2024): 2,568
- Time zone: UTC+3 (TRT)

Irlıganlı is a neighbourhood of the municipality and district of Pamukkale, Denizli Province, Turkey. Its population is 2,568 (2024).
