= Çakırbağ, Kale =

Village in Turkey

Çakırbağ
- Neighbourhood
- Location in Turkey Çakırbağ (Turkey Aegean)
- Coordinates: 37°27′08″N 28°43′57″E
- Country: Turkey
- Province: Denizli
- District: Kale
- Population (2022): 253
- Time zone: UTC+3 (TRT)
- Postal code: 20570

Çakırbağ is a neighbourhood in the municipality and district of Kale, Denizli Province in Turkey. Its population is 253 (2022).
