= Kumluca, Sarayköy =

Village in Turkey

Kumluca
- Neighbourhood
- Location in Turkey Kumluca (Turkey Aegean)
- Coordinates: 37.9047°N 28.8669°E
- Country: Turkey
- Province: Denizli
- District: Sarayköy
- Population (2022): 119
- Time zone: UTC+3 (TRT)

Kumluca is a neighbourhood in the municipality and district of Sarayköy, Denizli Province in Turkey. Its population is 119 (2022).
