= Değirmenönü, Merkezefendi =

Village in Turkey

Değirmenönü
- Neighbourhood
- Location in Turkey Değirmenönü (Turkey Aegean)
- Coordinates: 37.7719°N 29.0803°E
- Country: Turkey
- Province: Denizli
- District: Merkezefendi
- Population (2022): 17,216
- Time zone: UTC+3 (TRT)

Değirmenönü is a neighbourhood in the municipality and district of Merkezefendi, Denizli Province in Turkey. Its population is 17,216 (2022).
