= Muslugüme, Kale =

Village in Turkey

Muslugüme
- Neighbourhood
- Location in Turkey Muslugüme (Turkey Aegean)
- Coordinates: 37°26′10″N 28°38′53″E
- Country: Turkey
- Province: Denizli
- District: Kale
- Population (2022): 120
- Time zone: UTC+3 (TRT)

Muslugüme is a neighbourhood in the municipality and district of Kale, Denizli Province in Turkey. Its population is 120 (2022).
