= Gülalan =

- Location within Azerbaijan
- Coordinates: 41°28′12″N 48°51′19″E
- Country: Azerbaijan
- Rayon: Khachmaz
- Municipality: Qaraqurdlu
- Time zone: UTC+4 (AZT)
  - Summer (DST): UTC+5 (AZT)

Gülalan (also, Güləlan, Gyuladan, and Gyulalan) is a village in the Khachmaz Rayon of Azerbaijan. The village forms part of the municipality of Qaraqurdlu.
