= Hisarköy, Sarayköy =

Village in Turkey

Hisarköy
- Neighbourhood
- Interactive map of Hisarköy
- Location within Turkey Location within Turkey Aegean
- Coordinates: 37.836°N 28.812°E
- Country: Turkey
- Province: Denizli
- District: Sarayköy
- Population (2022): 267
- Time zone: UTC+3 (TRT)

Hisarköy is a neighbourhood in the municipality and district of Sarayköy, Denizli Province in Turkey. Its population is 267 (2022).
