= Aşağıçeşme, Güney =

Village in Turkey

Aşağıçeşme
- Neighbourhood
- Location in Turkey Aşağıçeşme (Turkey Aegean)
- Coordinates: 38.2288°N 29.0874°E
- Country: Turkey
- Province: Denizli
- District: Güney
- Population (2022): 226
- Time zone: UTC+3 (TRT)

Aşağıçeşme is a neighbourhood in the municipality and district of Güney, Denizli Province in Turkey. Its population is 226 (2022).
