= Saruhan, Merkezefendi =

Village in Turkey

Saruhan
- Neighbourhood
- Location in Turkey Saruhan (Turkey Aegean)
- Coordinates: 37°47′49″N 28°58′55″E
- Country: Turkey
- Province: Denizli
- District: Merkezefendi
- Population (2024): 468
- Time zone: UTC+3 (TRT)

Saruhan is a neighbourhood of the municipality and district of Merkezefendi, Denizli Province, Turkey. Its population is 486 (2024).
