= 1200 Evler, Merkezefendi =

Village in Turkey

1200 Evler
- Neighbourhood
- Location in Turkey 1200 Evler (Turkey Aegean)
- Coordinates: 37.7829°N 29.0058°E
- Country: Turkey
- Province: Denizli
- District: Merkezefendi
- Population (2022): 6,645
- Time zone: UTC+3 (TRT)

1200 Evler is a neighbourhood in the municipality and district of Merkezefendi, Denizli Province in Turkey. Its population is 6,645 (2022).
