= Benlik, Acıpayam =

Village in Turkey

Benlik
- Neighbourhood
- Location in Turkey Benlik (Turkey Aegean)
- Coordinates: 37°12′00″N 29°11′54″E
- Country: Turkey
- Province: Denizli
- District: Acıpayam
- Population (2022): 441
- Time zone: UTC+3 (TRT)

Benlik is a neighbourhood in the municipality and district of Acıpayam, Denizli Province in Turkey. Its population is 441 (2022).
