= Altındere, Merkezefendi =

Village in Turkey

Altındere
- Neighbourhood
- Location in Turkey Altındere (Turkey Aegean)
- Coordinates: 37.7929°N 28.9350°E
- Country: Turkey
- Province: Denizli
- District: Merkezefendi
- Population (2022): 632
- Time zone: UTC+3 (TRT)

Altındere is a neighbourhood in the municipality and district of Merkezefendi, Denizli Province in Turkey. Its population is 632 (2022).
