= Adaköy, Sarayköy =

Village in Turkey

Adaköy
- Neighbourhood
- Location in Turkey Adaköy (Turkey Aegean)
- Coordinates: 37.9564°N 29.0111°E
- Country: Turkey
- Province: Denizli
- District: Sarayköy
- Population (2022): 395
- Time zone: UTC+3 (TRT)

Adaköy is a neighbourhood in the municipality and district of Sarayköy, Denizli Province in Turkey. Its population is 395 (2022).
