= Acıpayam sheep =

Breed of sheep

Acıpayam
- Country of origin: Turkey
- Use: Wool, meat

Traits
- Weight: Male: 65 kg (140 lb); Female: 60 kg (130 lb)
- Wool color: White
- Face color: White

The Acıpayam is a breed of domesticated sheep that originated in Turkey. They are a dual-purpose breed (wool and meat). They are a mix of Awassi, Ost Fries and Daglic breeds.

== Characteristics ==
They average 54.6kg in weight. Both sexes have white, coarse wool.

== Production ==
Ewes have a mean daily milk yield of 906.2g, with a lactation period of 199 days. Lambs have an average growth rate of 83.77g/day. However, there is wide variation in production traits between individual sheep. They produce 34.7 micron wool and cut 3.1kg of greasy fleece on average. Their fleece is best suited to carpet making.

== Development ==
The Acıpayam was developed in the 1990s in Denizli, a city in the Aegean region of Turkey, in an effort to improve production traits of local breeds. The Awassi and Daglic were chosen for their ability to withstand local conditions, and the Ost Fries for its milk yield. The genetic contribution from each of these breeds was 50% Awassi, 25% Ost Fries and 25% Daglic.
