= Adalet, Merkezefendi =

Village in Turkey

Adalet
- Neighbourhood
- Location in Turkey Adalet (Turkey Aegean)
- Coordinates: 37.780°N 29.025°E
- Country: Turkey
- Province: Denizli
- District: Merkezefendi
- Population (2022): 18,525
- Time zone: UTC+3 (TRT)

Adalet is a neighbourhood in the municipality and district of Merkezefendi, Denizli Province in Turkey. Its population is 18,525 (2022).
