= Doğanköy, Kale =

Village in Turkey

Doğanköy
- Neighbourhood
- Location in Turkey Doğanköy (Turkey Aegean)
- Coordinates: 37°31′05″N 28°39′07″E
- Country: Turkey
- Province: Denizli
- District: Kale
- Population (2022): 149
- Time zone: UTC+3 (TRT)
- Postal code: 20570

Doğanköy is a neighbourhood in the municipality and district of Kale, Denizli Province in Turkey. Its population is 149 (2022).
