= Adamharmanı, Kale =

Village in Turkey

Adamharmanı
- Neighbourhood
- Location in Turkey Adamharmanı (Turkey Aegean)
- Coordinates: 37°33′26.2″N 28°45′37.8″E
- Country: Turkey
- Province: Denizli
- District: Kale
- Population (2022): 223
- Time zone: UTC+3 (TRT)
- Postal code: 20570

Adamharmanı is a neighbourhood in the municipality and district of Kale, Denizli Province in Turkey. Its population is 223 (2022).
