= Güney =

- District and municipality
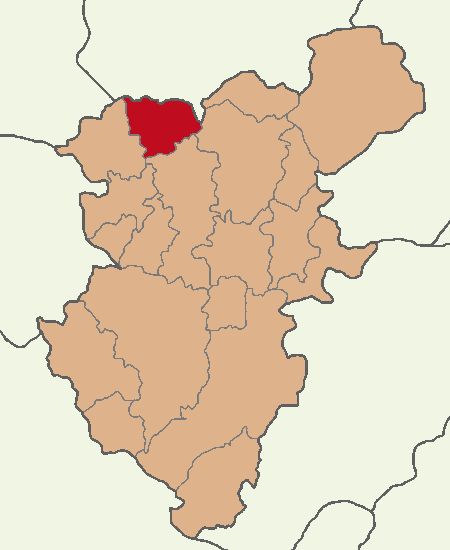
- Map showing Güney District in Denizli Province

- Location in Turkey Güney (Turkey Aegean)
- Coordinates: 38°09′16″N 29°04′04″E
- Country: Turkey
- Province: Denizli

Government
  - Mayor: Mehmet Ali Eraydin (CHP)
- Area: 362 km^{2} (140 sq mi)
- Population (2022): 9,448
  - Density: 26.1/km^{2} (67.6/sq mi)
- Time zone: UTC+3 (TRT)
- Area code: 0258
- Website: www.guney.bel.tr

Güney is a municipality and district of Denizli Province, Turkey. It covers an area of 362 km^{2}, and as of 2022, its population was 9,448. Güney district area neighbors those of four other districts of the same province from east to west, clockwise Buldan, Pamukkale and Çal and ranges Eşme district of Uşak Province in the north.

Güney district area is located at one of the sources of Büyük Menderes River. Güney town lies at a distance of 70 km (43 mi) north of the province seat of Denizli. It is situated on a steep hillside. Formerly a township depending Çal at first and then Buldan, Güney was made into a district center in 1948.

Pamukkale winery has many of its vineyards in Güney. Güney Falls (Güney Şelalesi), at a distance of 3 km (2 mi) from the district center is a visitor attraction and is under official protection. Adıgüzel Dam, also on the River Menderes further up, is between the townships of Güney and Bekilli. Yet another dam in phase of being built is Cindere Dam also on Büyük Menderes River.

Güney is known for its vineyards. They produce one of the best wine grapes in Turkey. It is often labeled as the "Napa Valley" of Turkey. Many of the Turkish wine producers source a sizable portion of their grapes from local farmers in Güney. Wine producer "Pamukkale" has its own vineyards and production center located in this town. Types of grapes commonly grown in Güney include Shiraz, Cabarnet Sauvignon, Merlot, Kalecik Karasi, Cabarnet Blanc and Chardonnay. What makes Güney wine grapes so popular is a combination of climate, altitude and soil properties.

Epigraphic and numismatic evidence points at the existence of two ancient cities near Güney; namely Sala and Tralla, possibly constituting a border at one time between Lydia and Phrygia, but their exact sites could not yet be determined with certainty.

== Composition ==
There are 24 neighbourhoods in Güney District:

- Adıgüzeller
- Aşağıçeşme
- Aydoğdu
- Çamrak
- Cindere
- Çorbacılar
- Doğanlı
- Ertuğrul
- Eziler
- Fatih
- Hamidiye
- Haylamaz
- Karaağaçlı
- Karagözler
- Kerimler
- Koparan
- Orta
- Ortaçeşme
- Parmaksızlar
- Tilkilik
- Üçeylül
- Yağcılar
- Yeni
- Yenikonak

== Climate ==
Güney has a hot-summer Mediterranean climate (Köppen: Csa), with hot, dry summers, and chilly winters.

Climate data for Güney (1991–2020)
| Month | Jan | Feb | Mar | Apr | May | Jun | Jul | Aug | Sep | Oct | Nov | Dec | Year |
|---|---|---|---|---|---|---|---|---|---|---|---|---|---|
| Mean daily maximum °C (°F) | 7.8 (46.0) | 9.6 (49.3) | 13.2 (55.8) | 17.8 (64.0) | 23.4 (74.1) | 28.4 (83.1) | 32.3 (90.1) | 32.4 (90.3) | 27.9 (82.2) | 21.8 (71.2) | 15.1 (59.2) | 9.5 (49.1) | 20.0 (68.0) |
| Daily mean °C (°F) | 3.7 (38.7) | 4.8 (40.6) | 7.7 (45.9) | 12.0 (53.6) | 17.2 (63.0) | 21.8 (71.2) | 25.1 (77.2) | 25.1 (77.2) | 20.8 (69.4) | 15.6 (60.1) | 9.9 (49.8) | 5.5 (41.9) | 14.2 (57.6) |
| Mean daily minimum °C (°F) | 0.4 (32.7) | 1.0 (33.8) | 3.4 (38.1) | 7.2 (45.0) | 11.9 (53.4) | 15.8 (60.4) | 18.6 (65.5) | 18.7 (65.7) | 15.0 (59.0) | 10.8 (51.4) | 6.0 (42.8) | 2.2 (36.0) | 9.3 (48.7) |
| Average precipitation mm (inches) | 67.48 (2.66) | 59.7 (2.35) | 54.8 (2.16) | 53.74 (2.12) | 49.06 (1.93) | 25.74 (1.01) | 13.23 (0.52) | 14.38 (0.57) | 16.0 (0.63) | 36.09 (1.42) | 54.86 (2.16) | 71.25 (2.81) | 516.33 (20.33) |
| Average precipitation days (≥ 1.0 mm) | 7.8 | 7.5 | 7.0 | 7.0 | 6.3 | 3.9 | 1.8 | 2.1 | 3.1 | 4.6 | 5.3 | 8.4 | 64.8 |
| Average relative humidity (%) | 70.7 | 67.8 | 63.1 | 58.4 | 54.2 | 48.8 | 42.4 | 43.3 | 48.0 | 56.6 | 62.2 | 71.2 | 57.1 |
Source: NOAA

== Image gallery ==
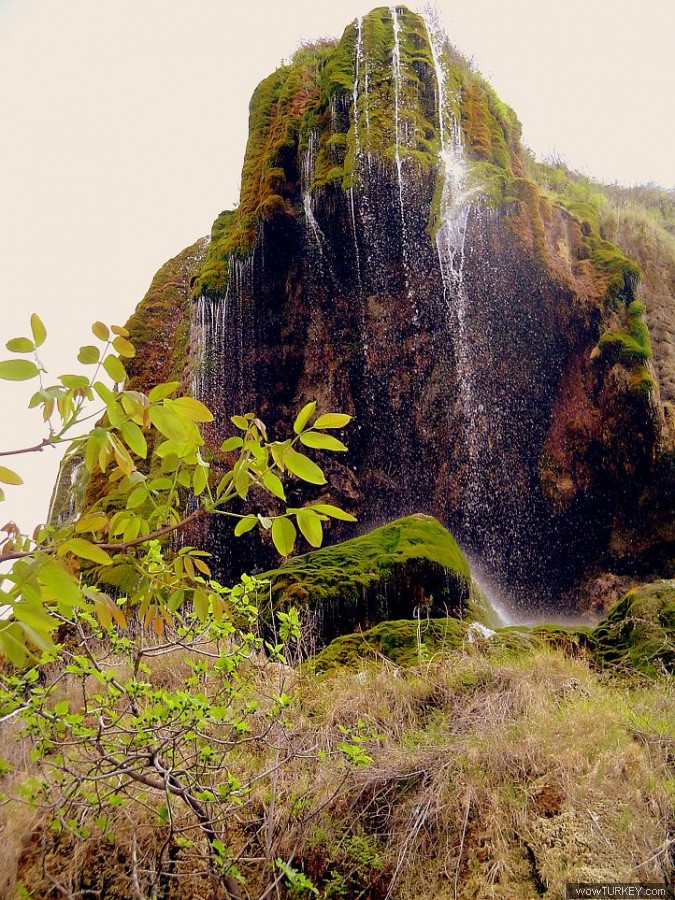

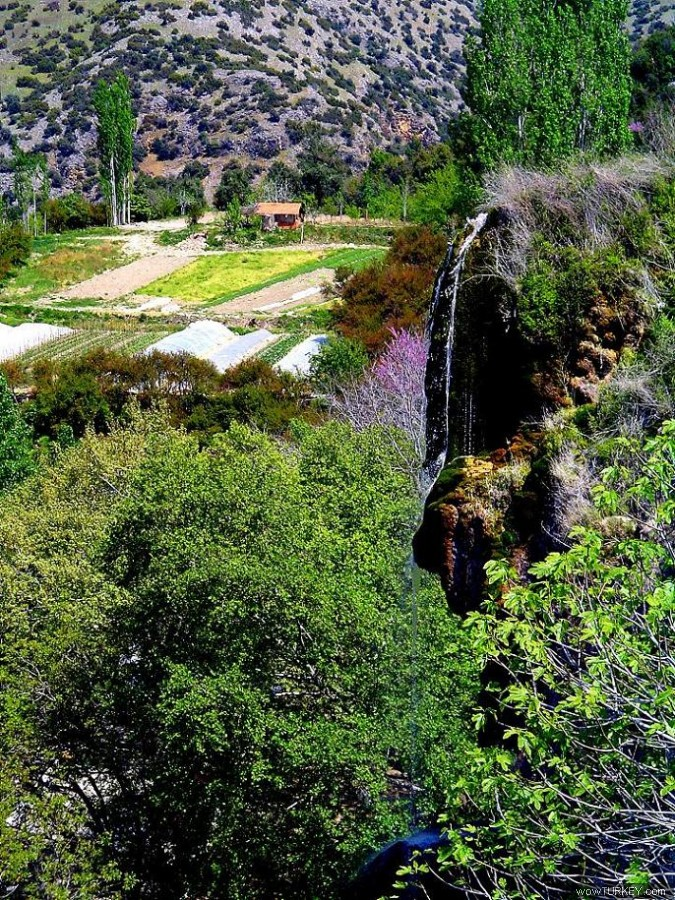
