= Haylamaz, Güney =

Village in Turkey

Haylamaz
- Neighbourhood
- Location in Turkey Haylamaz (Turkey Aegean)
- Coordinates: 38°12′N 28°59′E
- Country: Turkey
- Province: Denizli
- District: Güney
- Population (2022): 582
- Time zone: UTC+3 (TRT)

Haylamaz is a neighbourhood in the municipality and district of Güney, Denizli Province in Turkey. Its population is 582 (2022).
