= Alpaslan, Merkezefendi =

Village in Turkey

Alpaslan
- Neighbourhood
- Location in Turkey Alpaslan (Turkey Aegean)
- Coordinates: 37.7900°N 29.0589°E
- Country: Turkey
- Province: Denizli
- District: Merkezefendi
- Population (2022): 2,473
- Time zone: UTC+3 (TRT)

Alpaslan is a neighbourhood in the municipality and district of Merkezefendi, Denizli Province in Turkey. Its population is 2,473 (2022).
