= Apa, Acıpayam =

Village in Turkey

Apa
- Neighbourhood
- Location in Turkey Apa (Turkey Aegean)
- Coordinates: 37°30′25″N 29°21′16″E
- Country: Turkey
- Province: Denizli
- District: Acıpayam
- Population (2022): 639
- Time zone: UTC+3 (TRT)

Apa is a neighbourhood in the municipality and district of Acıpayam, Denizli Province in Turkey. Its population is 639 (2022).
