= Koçarboğazı, Kale =

Village in Turkey

Koçarboğazı
- Neighbourhood
- Location in Turkey Koçarboğazı (Turkey Aegean)
- Coordinates: 37°23′N 28°54′E
- Country: Turkey
- Province: Denizli
- District: Kale
- Population (2022): 145
- Time zone: UTC+3 (TRT)

Koçarboğazı is a neighbourhood in the municipality and district of Kale, Denizli Province in Turkey. Its population is 145 (2022).
