= Bereketler, Merkezefendi =

Village in Turkey

Bereketler
- Neighbourhood
- Location in Turkey Bereketler (Turkey Aegean)
- Coordinates: 37.7772°N 29.0132°E
- Country: Turkey
- Province: Denizli
- District: Merkezefendi
- Population (2022): 1,815
- Time zone: UTC+3 (TRT)

Bereketler is a neighbourhood in the municipality and district of Merkezefendi, Denizli Province in Turkey. Its population is 1,815 (2022).
