= Köprübaşı, Sarayköy =

Village in Turkey

Köprübaşı
- Neighbourhood
- Country: Turkey
- Province: Denizli
- District: Sarayköy
- Population (2022): 388
- Time zone: UTC+3 (TRT)

Köprübaşı is a neighbourhood in the municipality and district of Sarayköy, Denizli Province in Turkey. Its population is 388 (2022).
