= Avşar, Acıpayam =

Village in Turkey

Avşar
- Neighbourhood
- Country: Turkey
- Province: Denizli
- District: Acıpayam
- Population (2022): 587
- Time zone: UTC+3 (TRT)

Avşar (formerly: Karahüyükafşarı) is a neighbourhood in the municipality and district of Acıpayam, Denizli Province in Turkey. Its population is 587 (2022).
