= Bedirbey, Acıpayam =

Village in Turkey

Bedirbey
- Neighbourhood
- Location in Turkey Bedirbey (Turkey Aegean)
- Coordinates: 37°21′N 29°26′E
- Country: Turkey
- Province: Denizli
- District: Acıpayam
- Population (2022): 162
- Time zone: UTC+3 (TRT)

Bedirbey is a neighbourhood in the municipality and district of Acıpayam, Denizli Province in Turkey. Its population is 162 (2022).
