= Gültepe, Merkezefendi =

Village in Turkey

Gültepe
- Neighbourhood
- Location in Turkey Gültepe (Turkey Aegean)
- Coordinates: 37°47′21″N 29°02′52″E
- Country: Turkey
- Province: Denizli
- District: Merkezefendi
- Population (2022): 13,700
- Time zone: UTC+3 (TRT)

Gültepe is a neighbourhood of the municipality and district of Merkezefendi, Denizli Province, Turkey. Its population is 13,700 (2022).
