= Sandalcık, Acıpayam =

Village in Turkey

Sandalcık
- Neighbourhood
- Location in Turkey Sandalcık (Turkey Aegean)
- Coordinates: 37°06′N 29°06′E
- Country: Turkey
- Province: Denizli
- District: Acıpayam
- Population (2022): 225
- Time zone: UTC+3 (TRT)

Sandalcık is a neighbourhood in the municipality and district of Acıpayam, Denizli Province in Turkey. Its population is 225 (2022).
