= Hacıkurtlar, Acıpayam =

Village in Turkey

Hacıkurtlar
- Neighbourhood
- Location in Turkey Hacıkurtlar (Turkey Aegean)
- Coordinates: 37°11′17″N 29°18′35″E
- Country: Turkey
- Province: Denizli
- District: Acıpayam
- Population (2022): 146
- Time zone: UTC+3 (TRT)

Hacıkurtlar is a neighbourhood in the municipality and district of Acıpayam, Denizli Province in Turkey. Its population is 146 (2022).
