= Yeşilyurt, Sarayköy =

Village in Turkey

Yeşilyurt
- Neighbourhood
- Country: Turkey
- Province: Denizli
- District: Sarayköy
- Population (2022): 71
- Time zone: UTC+3 (TRT)

Yeşilyurt is a neighbourhood in the municipality and district of Sarayköy, Denizli Province in Turkey. Its population is 71 (2022).
