= Karakıran, Sarayköy =

Village in Turkey

Karakıran
- Neighbourhood
- Location in Turkey Karakıran (Turkey Aegean)
- Coordinates: 37°56′N 28°51′E
- Country: Turkey
- Province: Denizli
- District: Sarayköy
- Population (2022): 231
- Time zone: UTC+3 (TRT)

Karakıran is a neighbourhood in the municipality and district of Sarayköy, Denizli Province in Turkey. Its population is 231 (2022).
