= Çubukçular, Acıpayam =

Village in Turkey

Çubukçular
- Neighbourhood
- Location in Turkey Çubukçular (Turkey Aegean)
- Coordinates: 37°21′N 29°17′E
- Country: Turkey
- Province: Denizli
- District: Acıpayam
- Population (2022): 27
- Time zone: UTC+3 (TRT)

Çubukçular is a neighbourhood in the municipality and district of Acıpayam, Denizli Province in Turkey. Its population is 27 (2022).
