= Bahçelievler, Merkezefendi =

Village in Turkey

Bahçelievler
- Neighbourhood
- Location in Turkey Bahçelievler (Turkey Aegean)
- Coordinates: 37.7724°N 29.0321°E
- Country: Turkey
- Province: Denizli
- District: Merkezefendi
- Population (2022): 6,510
- Time zone: UTC+3 (TRT)

Bahçelievler is a neighbourhood in the municipality and district of Merkezefendi, Denizli Province in Turkey. Its population is 6,510 (2022).
