= Hamidiye, Güney =

Village in Turkey

Hamidiye
- Neighbourhood
- Location in Turkey Hamidiye (Turkey Aegean)
- Coordinates: 38°06′53″N 28°58′45″E
- Country: Turkey
- Province: Denizli
- District: Güney
- Population (2022): 60
- Time zone: UTC+3 (TRT)

Hamidiye is a neighbourhood in the municipality and district of Güney, Denizli Province in Turkey. Its population is 60 (2022).
