= Parmaksızlar, Güney =

Village in Turkey

Parmaksızlar
- Neighbourhood
- Location in Turkey Parmaksızlar (Turkey Aegean)
- Coordinates: 38°12′14″N 29°07′00″E
- Country: Turkey
- Province: Denizli
- District: Güney
- Population (2022): 207
- Time zone: UTC+3 (TRT)

Parmaksızlar is a neighbourhood in the municipality and district of Güney, Denizli Province in Turkey. Its population is 207 (2022).
