= Chios sheep =

Breed of sheep

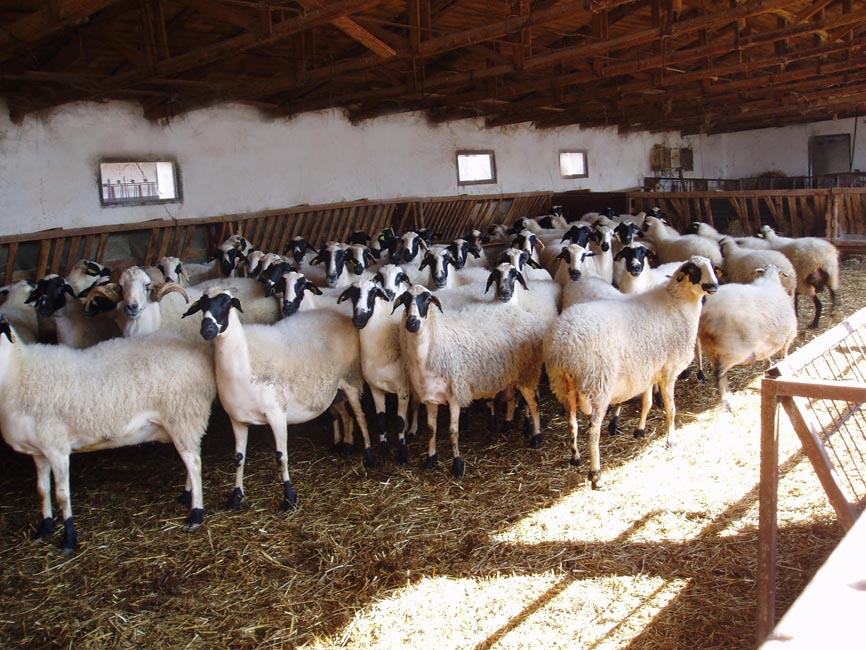
Chios sheep

The Chios is a breed of domestic sheep with specific unknown origins. It is classified as a semi-fat tailed breed. The Chios are bred mainly for their milk production. Although there is speculation that this breed may have been crossed with Kivircik and Dagliç, it is commonly accepted that it originated on the Greek island of Chios.

== Characteristics ==
This breed typically has black spots on the ears, nose, belly, legs and around the eyes. Brown spots have been observed also. Mature ewes weigh 105 to 155 lb (48 to 70 kg) and mature rams weigh 145 to 200 lb (66 to 91 kg). Both sexes are horned; however, ewes can also be polled (hornless). Horns of the rams have a large spiral. If ewes have horns, they are small like a knob.

Ewes can have two crops of lambs per year with an average of 1.5 to 2.3 lambs per litter. Average weight at birth is 8.0 to 8.5 lb (3.6 to 3.9 kg). At 45 days, lambs weigh on average 32.5 to 35.0 lb (14.7 to 15.9 kg) Ewes can produce 265 to 600 lb (120 to 272 kg) of milk per lactation. The average lactation period is 210 days. The milk is used to produce many types of cheeses, such as Feta, Batzos, Manouri and many others. The highest recorded milk production was 777 litres in a 220 days lactation period.

Wool diameter is 27 to 35 micrometres with a spinning count 44's to 56's. The staple length is 8.0 to 13.0 cm (3.1 to 5.1 in). A raw fleece weighs about 2.6 to 5.5 lb (1.2 to 2.5 kg). There is considerable variation between individuals in regards to fleece quality. However, the quality of fleece of an individual is typically consistent.

From 1983 to 2007, the world population of the Chios has increased from 16,000 to 51,860.

== Chios sheep farms ==
In a recent survey, the farm conditions and production methods in intensively reared flocks of Chios sheep in Greece have been described showing an important structural and managerial development compared to the more traditional systems which are still dominant in Greece. According to the aforementioned survey, the average flock comprised 314 sheep (16 rams, 210 ewes and 88 lamb ewes) and the average milk yield per ewe was 276.6±55.6 kg/lactation (adjusted for 210 days of lactation). Moreover, mean prolificacy was 2.1±0.3 and the mean BW of lambs at birth was 3.5, 3.9 and 4.6, for triplets, twins and single lambs, respectively. Rearing of lambs for 6–8 weeks was the common practice followed by a 7-month ewe's milking period.

Based on this fact, a study in order to produce a typology of intensive Chios dairy sheep farms in Greece was conducted. From this study, four clusters were recognized:

Cluster 1: Newly established, intensive, well-equipped specialized farms

Cluster 2: Well-established farms with balanced sheep and feed/crop production

Cluster 3: Small flock farms focusing more on arable crops than on sheep farming with a tendency to evolve toward cluster 2

Cluster 4: Farms representing a rather conservative form of Chios sheep breeding with low/intermediate inputs and choosing not to focus on feed/crop production
