= Kabaağaç, Sarayköy =

Village in Turkey

Kabaağaç
- Neighbourhood
- Location in Turkey Kabaağaç (Turkey Aegean)
- Coordinates: 37.932346°N 28.757694°E
- Country: Turkey
- Province: Denizli
- District: Sarayköy
- Population (2022): 268
- Time zone: UTC+3 (TRT)

Kabaağaç is a neighbourhood in the municipality and district of Sarayköy, Denizli Province in Turkey. Its population is 268 (2022).
