= Uyanık, Sarayköy =

Village in Turkey

Uyanık
- Neighbourhood
- Location in Turkey Uyanık (Turkey Aegean)
- Coordinates: 37.951981°N 28.984822°E
- Country: Turkey
- Province: Denizli
- District: Sarayköy
- Population (2022): 519
- Time zone: UTC+3 (TRT)

Uyanık is a neighbourhood in the municipality and district of Sarayköy, Denizli Province in Turkey. Its population is 519 (2022).
