= Gerali, Sarayköy =

Village in Turkey

Gerali
- Neighbourhood
- Location in Turkey Gerali (Turkey Aegean)
- Coordinates: 37°54′04″N 28°54′47″E
- Country: Turkey
- Province: Denizli
- District: Sarayköy
- Population (2022): 1,257
- Time zone: UTC+3 (TRT)

Gerali is a neighbourhood in the municipality and district of Sarayköy, Denizli Province in Turkey. Its population is 1,257 (2022).
