= Akçeşme, Merkezefendi =

Village in Turkey

Akçeşme
- Neighbourhood
- Location in Turkey Akçeşme (Turkey Aegean)
- Coordinates: 37.8130°N 29.0708°E
- Country: Turkey
- Province: Denizli
- District: Merkezefendi
- Population (2022): 1,577
- Time zone: UTC+3 (TRT)

Akçeşme is a neighbourhood in the municipality and district of Merkezefendi, Denizli Province in Turkey. Its population is 1,577 (2022).
