= Acısu, Sarayköy =

Village in Turkey

Acısu
- Neighbourhood
- Location in Turkey Acısu (Turkey Aegean)
- Coordinates: 37.9087°N 28.8959°E
- Country: Turkey
- Province: Denizli
- District: Sarayköy
- Population (2022): 279
- Time zone: UTC+3 (TRT)

Acısu is a neighbourhood in the municipality and district of Sarayköy, Denizli Province in Turkey. Its population is 279 (2022).
