= Belenköy, Kale =

Village in Turkey

Belenköy
- Neighbourhood
- Location in Turkey Belenköy (Turkey Aegean)
- Coordinates: 37°26′11″N 28°44′41″E
- Country: Turkey
- Province: Denizli
- District: Kale
- Population (2022): 234
- Time zone: UTC+3 (TRT)
- Postal code: 20570

Belenköy is a neighbourhood in the municipality and district of Kale, Denizli Province in Turkey. Its population is 234 (2022).
