= Barutçular, Merkezefendi =

Village in Turkey

Barutçular
- Neighbourhood
- Location in Turkey Barutçular (Turkey Aegean)
- Coordinates: 37.7701°N 29.0050°E
- Country: Turkey
- Province: Denizli
- District: Merkezefendi
- Population (2022): 341
- Time zone: UTC+3 (TRT)

Barutçular is a neighbourhood in the municipality and district of Merkezefendi, Denizli Province in Turkey. Its population is 341 (2022).
