= Hacıqurbanoba =

- Location within Azerbaijan
- Coordinates: 41°30′N 48°51′E
- Country: Azerbaijan
- Rayon: Khachmaz
- Municipality: Qaraqurdlu
- Time zone: UTC+4 (AZT)
  - Summer (DST): UTC+5 (AZT)

Hacıqurbanoba (also, Gadzhikurban-Oba and Gadzhykurbanoba) is a village in the Khachmaz Rayon of Azerbaijan. The village forms part of the municipality of Qaraqurdlu.
