= Çakmak, Merkezefendi =

Village in Turkey

Çakmak
- Neighbourhood
- Location in Turkey Çakmak (Turkey Aegean)
- Coordinates: 37.7927°N 29.0023°E
- Country: Turkey
- Province: Denizli
- District: Merkezefendi
- Population (2022): 7,996
- Time zone: UTC+3 (TRT)

Çakmak is a neighbourhood in the municipality and district of Merkezefendi, Denizli Province in Turkey. Its population is 7,996 (2022).
