= Sırçalık, Acıpayam =

Village in Turkey

Sırçalık
- Neighbourhood
- Location in Turkey Sırçalık (Turkey Aegean)
- Coordinates: 37°31′N 29°29′E
- Country: Turkey
- Province: Denizli
- District: Acıpayam
- Population (2022): 75
- Time zone: UTC+3 (TRT)

Sırçalık is a neighbourhood in the municipality and district of Acıpayam, Denizli Province in Turkey. Its population is 75 (2022).
