= Tekke, Sarayköy =

Village in Turkey

Tekke
- Neighbourhood
- Location in Turkey Tekke (Turkey Aegean)
- Coordinates: 37.909157°N 28.7661°E
- Country: Turkey
- Province: Denizli
- District: Sarayköy
- Population (2022): 105
- Time zone: UTC+3 (TRT)

Tekke (also: Tekkeköy) is a neighbourhood in the municipality and district of Sarayköy, Denizli Province in Turkey. Its population is 105 (2022).
