= Alcı, Acıpayam =

Village in Turkey

Alcı
- Neighbourhood
- Location in Turkey Alcı (Turkey Aegean)
- Coordinates: 37°08′36″N 29°11′12″E
- Country: Turkey
- Province: Denizli
- District: Acıpayam
- Population (2022): 1,061
- Time zone: UTC+3 (TRT)

Alcı is a neighbourhood in the municipality and district of Acıpayam, Denizli Province in Turkey. Its population is 1,061 (2022).
