= Tepeköy, Sarayköy =

Village in Turkey

Tepeköy
- Neighbourhood
- Location in Turkey Tepeköy (Turkey Aegean)
- Coordinates: 38.010136°N 28.992266°E
- Country: Turkey
- Province: Denizli
- District: Sarayköy
- Population (2022): 254
- Time zone: UTC+3 (TRT)

Tepeköy is a neighbourhood in the municipality and district of Sarayköy, Denizli Province in Turkey. Its population is 254 (2022).
