= Kadılar, Merkezefendi =

Village in Turkey

Kadılar
- Neighbourhood
- Location in Turkey Kadılar (Turkey Aegean)
- Coordinates: 37°45′50″N 28°59′24″E
- Country: Turkey
- Province: Denizli
- District: Merkezefendi
- Population (2023): 342
- Time zone: UTC+3 (TRT)

Kadılar is a neighbourhood of the municipality and district of Merkezefendi, Denizli Province, Turkey. Its population was 342 in 2023.
