= Yeşilyuva =

Town in Turkey

- Neighbourhood
- Location in Turkey Yeşilyuva (Turkey Aegean)
- Coordinates: 37°34′N 29°26′E
- Country: Turkey
- Province: Denizli
- District: Acıpayam
- Elevation: 445 m (1,460 ft)
- Population (2022): 3,659
- Time zone: UTC+3 (TRT)
- Postal code: 20800
- Area code: 0258

Yeşilyuva (formerly: Kayser) is a neighbourhood of the municipality and district of Acıpayam, Denizli Province, Turkey. Its population is 3,659 (2022). Before the 2013 reorganisation, it was a town (belde).

== Geography ==
Yeşilyuva is situated in a basin, the main river being Honaz which is a tributary of Büyükmenderes River (historical Maeander).

== History ==
The area around Yeşilyuva was inhabited during the ancient ages by Luvians, Arzawa, Hittites, and Lydians. The ruins of Roman town Diokasareia (Keretapa) are near the town. But the present town was founded in 13th century by a Turkmen tribe of Çelebi, soon after the area was incorporated into Seljuk realm. Two of the earliest settlers were Semarkandi Baba (from Semerkand, modern Uzbekistan) and Ahi Kayser, an Ahi, specialized on tannery. Hence the town was named Kayser. The town flourished in shoe making and in 1381 it was captured by the Ottoman Empire. In 1871 it was declared a seat of district (a subunit of the province). But Kayser residents opposed public servants appointed to work in district offices and upon their request the administrative status of the town was reduced to that of township in 1908. The town was renamed as Yeşilyuva in 1925.

== Economy ==
Yeşilyuva residents are expert shoe makers. Up to 1986, the shoes were produced in home shops. After the construction of 40,000 square metres (430,000 sq ft) industrial complex of the town the production figures are on the rise. Presently the production averages 3,000,000 pairs a year. Other economic activities (like grape farming) are only of minor importance.
