= Altıntepe, Sarayköy =

Village in Turkey

Altıntepe
- Neighbourhood
- Location in Turkey Altıntepe (Turkey Aegean)
- Coordinates: 37.8307°N 28.9638°E
- Country: Turkey
- Province: Denizli
- District: Sarayköy
- Population (2022): 405
- Time zone: UTC+3 (TRT)

Altıntepe is a neighbourhood in the municipality and district of Sarayköy, Denizli Province in Turkey. Its population is 405 (2022).
