= Habipler, Kale =

Village in Turkey

Habipler
- Neighbourhood
- Location in Turkey Habipler (Turkey Aegean)
- Coordinates: 37°22′50″N 28°49′34″E
- Country: Turkey
- Province: Denizli
- District: Kale
- Population (2022): 149
- Time zone: UTC+3 (TRT)

Habipler is a neighbourhood in the municipality and district of Kale, Denizli Province in Turkey. Its population is 149 (2022).
