= Çorbacılar, Güney =

Village in Turkey

Çorbacılar
- Neighbourhood
- Location in Turkey Çorbacılar (Turkey Aegean)
- Coordinates: 38°12′N 29°02′E
- Country: Turkey
- Province: Denizli
- District: Güney
- Population (2022): 90
- Time zone: UTC+3 (TRT)

Çorbacılar is a neighbourhood in the municipality and district of Güney, Denizli Province in Turkey. Its population is 90 (2022).
