= Develi, Pamukkale =

Village in Turkey

Develi
- Neighbourhood
- Location in Turkey Develi (Turkey Aegean)
- Coordinates: 37°55′55″N 29°06′00″E
- Country: Turkey
- Province: Denizli
- District: Pamukkale
- Population (2024): 1,010
- Time zone: UTC+3 (TRT)

Develi is a neighbourhood of the municipality and district of Pamukkale, Denizli Province, Turkey. Its population is 1,010 (2024).
