= Yakayurt, Sarayköy =

Village in Turkey

Yakayurt
- Neighbourhood
- Location in Turkey Yakayurt (Turkey Aegean)
- Coordinates: 37°56′N 28°54′E
- Country: Turkey
- Province: Denizli
- District: Sarayköy
- Population (2022): 74
- Time zone: UTC+3 (TRT)

Yakayurt is a neighbourhood in the municipality and district of Sarayköy, Denizli Province in Turkey. Its population is 74 (2022).
