= Narlı, Kale =

Village in Turkey

Narlı
- Neighbourhood
- Country: Turkey
- Province: Denizli
- District: Kale
- Population (2022): 395
- Time zone: UTC+3 (TRT)

Narlı is a neighbourhood in the municipality and district of Kale, Denizli Province in Turkey. Its population is 395 (2022).
