= Goncalı, Pamukkale =

Village in Turkey

Goncalı
- Neighbourhood
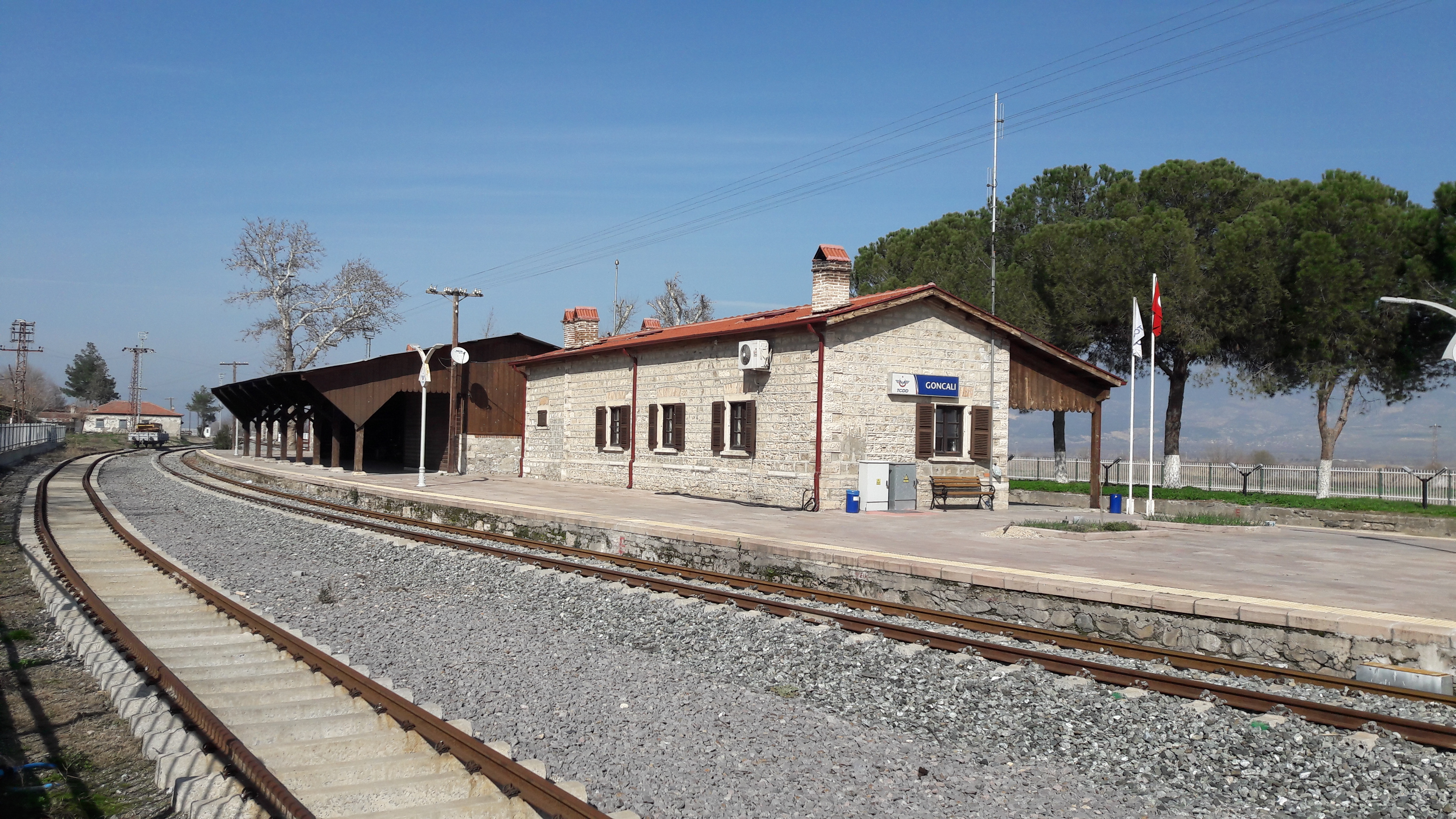
- Goncali railway station

- Location within Turkey Location within Turkey Aegean
- Coordinates: 37°50′46″N 29°06′25″E
- Country: Turkey
- Province: Denizli
- District: Pamukkale
- Population (2024): 913
- Time zone: UTC+3 (TRT)

Goncalı is a neighbourhood of the municipality and district of Pamukkale, Denizli Province, Turkey. Its population is 913 (2024).
