= Beylerbeyi, Sarayköy =

Village in Turkey

Beylerbeyi
- Neighbourhood
- Location in Turkey Beylerbeyi (Turkey Aegean)
- Coordinates: 37.8819°N 28.9790°E
- Country: Turkey
- Province: Denizli
- District: Sarayköy
- Population (2022): 973
- Time zone: UTC+3 (TRT)

Beylerbeyi is a neighbourhood in the municipality and district of Sarayköy, Denizli Province in Turkey. Its population is 973 (2022).
