= Yunusemre, Pamukkale =

Village in Turkey

Yunusemre
- Neighbourhood
- Country: Turkey
- Province: Denizli
- District: Pamukkale
- Population (2024): 7,076
- Time zone: UTC+3 (TRT)

Yunusemre is a neighbourhood of the municipality and district of Pamukkale, Denizli Province, Turkey. Its population is 7,076 (2024).
