= Kırköy, Kale =

Village in Turkey

Kırköy
- Neighbourhood
- Country: Turkey
- Province: Denizli
- District: Kale
- Population (2022): 252
- Time zone: UTC+3 (TRT)

Kırköy is a neighbourhood in the municipality and district of Kale, Denizli Province in Turkey. Its population is 252 (2022).
