= Tırkaz, Sarayköy =

Village in Turkey

Tırkaz
- Neighbourhood
- Location in Turkey Tırkaz (Turkey Aegean)
- Coordinates: 37°53′N 28°46′E
- Country: Turkey
- Province: Denizli
- District: Sarayköy
- Population (2022): 163
- Time zone: UTC+3 (TRT)

Tırkaz is a neighbourhood in the municipality and district of Sarayköy, Denizli Province in Turkey. Its population is 163 (2022).
