= Güzelköy, Pamukkale =

Village in Turkey

Güzelköy
- Neighbourhood
- Location in Turkey Güzelköy (Turkey Aegean)
- Coordinates: 37°48′58″N 29°09′50″E
- Country: Turkey
- Province: Denizli
- District: Pamukkale
- Population (2024): 2,873
- Time zone: UTC+3 (TRT)

Güzelköy is a neighbourhood of the municipality and district of Pamukkale, Denizli Province, Turkey. Its population is 2,873 (2024).
