= Alanyurt, Kale =

Village in Turkey

Alanyurt
- Neighbourhood
- Location in Turkey Alanyurt (Turkey Aegean)
- Coordinates: 37°20′31″N 28°48′25″E
- Country: Turkey
- Province: Denizli
- District: Kale
- Population (2022): 379
- Time zone: UTC+3 (TRT)
- Postal code: 20570

Alanyurt is a neighbourhood in the municipality and district of Kale, Denizli Province in Turkey. Its population is 379 (2022).
