= Merkezefendi, Merkezefendi =

Village in Turkey

Merkezefendi
- Village
- Country: Turkey
- Province: Denizli Province
- District: Merkezefendi

Population (2020)
  - Total: 11,017
- Time zone: UTC+3
  - Summer (DST): UTC+3 (EEST)

Merkezefendi is a neighbourhood of the municipality and district of Merkezefendi, Denizli Province, Turkey. Its population was 11,017 in 2020.
