= Sazak, Sarayköy =

Village in Turkey

Sazak
- Neighbourhood
- Location in Turkey Sazak (Turkey Aegean)
- Coordinates: 37.962516°N 28.908026°E
- Country: Turkey
- Province: Denizli
- District: Sarayköy
- Population (2022): 118
- Time zone: UTC+3 (TRT)

Sazak is a neighbourhood in the municipality and district of Sarayköy, Denizli Province in Turkey. Its population is 118 (2022).
