= Aydoğdu, Güney =

Village in Turkey

Aydoğdu
- Neighbourhood
- Location in Turkey Aydoğdu (Turkey Aegean)
- Coordinates: 38.1586°N 28.9524°E
- Country: Turkey
- Province: Denizli
- District: Güney
- Population (2022): 311
- Time zone: UTC+3 (TRT)

Aydoğdu is a neighbourhood in the municipality and district of Güney, Denizli Province in Turkey. Its population is 311 (2022).
