= Künar, Kale =

Village in Turkey

Künar
- Neighbourhood
- Location in Turkey Künar (Turkey Aegean)
- Coordinates: 37°26′N 28°40′E
- Country: Turkey
- Province: Denizli
- District: Kale
- Population (2022): 239
- Time zone: UTC+3 (TRT)

Künar is a neighbourhood in the municipality and district of Kale, Denizli Province in Turkey. Its population is 239 (2022).
