= Merkezefendi =

- District and municipality
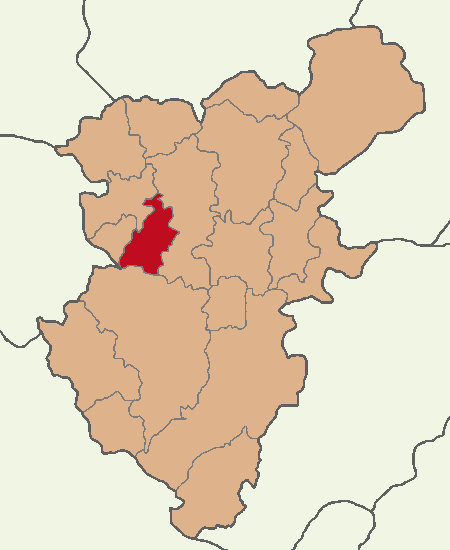
- Map showing Merkezefendi District in Denizli Province

- Location in Turkey Merkezefendi (Turkey Aegean)
- Coordinates: 37°47′N 29°06′E
- Country: Turkey
- Province: Denizli

Government
  - Mayor: Şeniz Doğan (CHP)
- Area: 336 km^{2} (130 sq mi)
- Elevation: 530 m (1,740 ft)
- Population (2022): 336,818
  - Density: 1,000/km^{2} (2,600/sq mi)
- Time zone: UTC+3 (TRT)
- Postal code: 20000
- Area code: 0258
- Website: www.merkezefendi.bel.tr

Merkezefendi (Turkish: [mæɾˈcezefendi]) is a municipality and district of Denizli Province, Turkey. Its area is 336 km^{2}, and its population is 336,818 (2022). The district was established as a result of the 2013 local government reorganisation from part of the former central district of Denizli. Another part of the former central district was added to the Pamukkale District. The name of the district refers to the 16th-century Sufi Merkez Efendi.

== Composition ==
There are 50 neighbourhoods in Merkezefendi District:

- 1200 Evler
- Adalet
- Akçeşme
- Akkonak
- Alpaslan
- Altındere
- Altıntop
- Aşağışamlı
- Bahçelievler
- Barbaros
- Barutçular
- Başkarcı
- Bereketler
- Bozburun
- Çakmak
- Çeltikçi
- Değirmenönü
- Eskihisar
- Gerzele
- Göveçlik
- Gültepe
- Gümüşçay
- Hacıeyüplü
- Hallaçlar
- Hisar
- İlbade
- Kadılar
- Karahasanlı
- Karaman
- Kayalar
- Kumkısık
- Mehmet Akif Ersoy
- Merkezefendi
- Muratdede
- Salihağa
- Saraylar
- Saruhan
- Selçuk Bey
- Şemikler
- Servergazi
- Sevindik
- Sırakapılar
- Şirinköy
- Sümer
- Üzerlik
- Yeni
- Yenişafak
- Yenişehir
- Yeşilyayla
- Zafer

== Sport ==
Merkezefendi Belediyesi Denizli Basket represents Merkezefendi and Denizli in Turkish Basketball Super League (BSL).
