= Acıdere, Sarayköy =

Village in Turkey

Acıdere
- Neighbourhood
- Location in Turkey Acıdere (Turkey Aegean)
- Coordinates: 37.8594°N 28.8729°E
- Country: Turkey
- Province: Denizli
- District: Sarayköy
- Population (2022): 58
- Time zone: UTC+3 (TRT)

Acıdere is a neighbourhood in the municipality and district of Sarayköy, Denizli Province in Turkey. Its population is 58 (2022).
