= Ortaçeşme, Güney =

Village in Turkey

Ortaçeşme
- Neighbourhood
- Country: Turkey
- Province: Denizli
- District: Güney
- Population (2022): 193
- Time zone: UTC+3 (TRT)

Ortaçeşme is a neighbourhood in the municipality and district of Güney, Denizli Province in Turkey. Its population is 193 (2022).
