= Ortaköy, Kale =

Village in Turkey

Ortaköy
- Neighbourhood
- Country: Turkey
- Province: Denizli
- District: Kale
- Population (2022): 228
- Time zone: UTC+3 (TRT)

Ortaköy is a neighbourhood in the municipality and district of Kale, Denizli Province in Turkey. Its population is 228 (2022).
