= Gümüşçay, Merkezefendi =

Village in Turkey

Gümüşçay
- Neighbourhood
- Location in Turkey Gümüşçay (Turkey Aegean)
- Coordinates: 37°47′59″N 29°03′50″E
- Country: Turkey
- Province: Denizli
- District: Merkezefendi
- Population (2022): 7,473
- Time zone: UTC+3 (TRT)

Gümüşçay is a neighbourhood of the municipality and district of Merkezefendi, Denizli Province, Turkey. Its population is 7,473 (2022).
