= Barbaros, Merkezefendi =

Village in Turkey

Barbaros
- Neighbourhood
- Location in Turkey Barbaros (Turkey Aegean)
- Coordinates: 37.7948°N 28.9716°E
- Country: Turkey
- Province: Denizli
- District: Merkezefendi
- Population (2022): 1,142
- Time zone: UTC+3 (TRT)

Barbaros is a neighbourhood in the municipality and district of Merkezefendi, Denizli Province in Turkey. Its population is 1,142 (2022).
