= Pınaryazı, Acıpayam =

Village in Turkey

Pınaryazı
- Neighbourhood
- Location in Turkey Pınaryazı (Turkey Aegean)
- Coordinates: 37°24′N 29°22′E
- Country: Turkey
- Province: Denizli
- District: Acıpayam
- Population (2022): 691
- Time zone: UTC+3 (TRT)

Pınaryazı is a neighbourhood in the municipality and district of Acıpayam, Denizli Province in Turkey. Its population is 691 (2022).
