= Hasköy, Sarayköy =

Village in Turkey

Hasköy
- Neighbourhood
- Location in Turkey Hasköy (Turkey Aegean)
- Coordinates: 37.926056°N 28.887361°E
- Country: Turkey
- Province: Denizli
- District: Sarayköy
- Population (2022): 474
- Time zone: UTC+3 (TRT)

Hasköy is a neighbourhood in the municipality and district of Sarayköy, Denizli Province in Turkey. Its population is 474 (2022).
