= Eskihisar, Denizli =

Eskihisar
- Neighbourhood
- Location in Turkey Eskihisar (Turkey Aegean)
- Coordinates: 37°49′19″N 29°6′23″E
- Country: Turkey
- Province: Denizli
- District: Merkezefendi
- Population (2022): 3,705
- Time zone: UTC+3 (TRT)

Eskihisar is a neighbourhood of the municipality and district of Merkezefendi, Denizli Province, Turkey. Its population is 3,705 (2022). The village is 5 kilometers from the city of Denizli.

Near the village are the ruins of the ancient city of Laodicea, one of the Seven Churches of Revelation. The name eski hisar means "old fortress" in Turkish.
