= Adıgüzeller, Güney =

Village in Turkey

Adıgüzeller
- Neighbourhood
- Location in Turkey Adıgüzeller (Turkey Aegean)
- Coordinates: 38°09′N 29°11′E
- Country: Turkey
- Province: Denizli
- District: Güney
- Population (2022): 95
- Time zone: UTC+3 (TRT)

Adıgüzeller is a neighbourhood in the municipality and district of Güney, Denizli Province in Turkey. Its population is 95 (2022).
