= Demirciler, Kale =

Village in Turkey

Demirciler
- Neighbourhood
- Location in Turkey Demirciler (Turkey Aegean)
- Coordinates: 37°18′49″N 28°44′38″E
- Country: Turkey
- Province: Denizli
- District: Kale
- Population (2022): 498
- Time zone: UTC+3 (TRT)
- Postal code: 20570

Demirciler is a neighbourhood in the municipality and district of Kale, Denizli Province in Turkey. Its population is 498 (2022).
