= Acıpayam =

- District and municipality
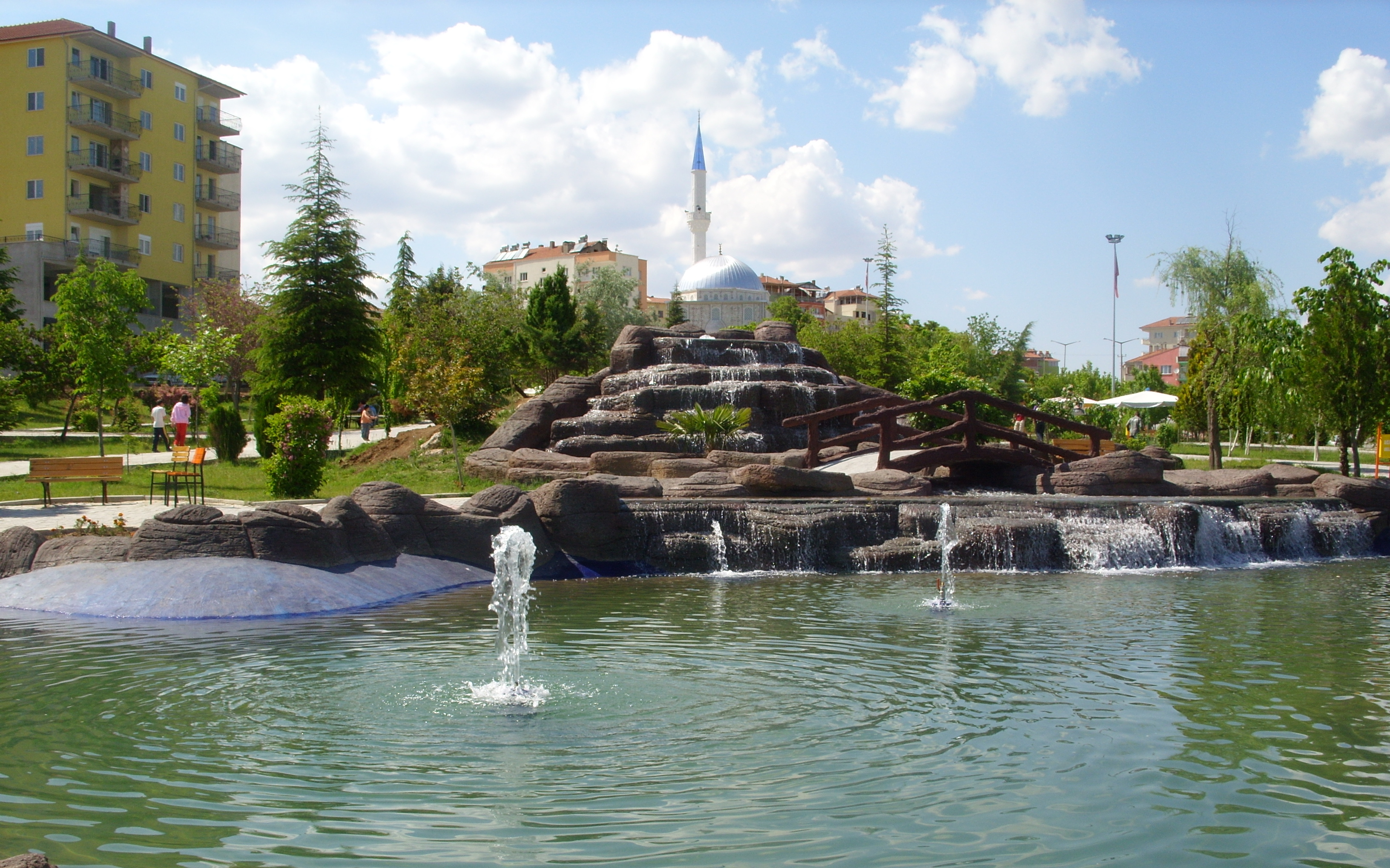

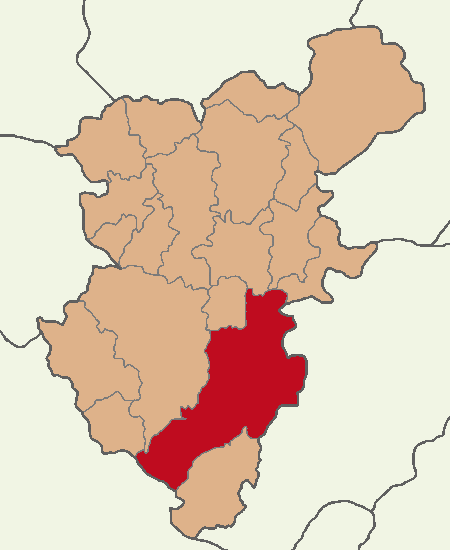
- Map showing Acıpayam District in Denizli Province

- Location within Turkey Location within Turkey Aegean
- Coordinates: 37°25′30″N 29°21′14″E
- Country: Turkey
- Province: Denizli

Government
  - Mayor: Levent Yildirim (CHP)
- Area: 1,772 km^{2} (684 sq mi)
- Elevation: 895 m (2,936 ft)
- Population (2022): 54,888
  - Density: 30.98/km^{2} (80.23/sq mi)
- Time zone: UTC+3 (TRT)
- Postal code: 20800
- Area code: 0258
- Website: www.acipayam.bel.tr

Acıpayam is a municipality and district of Denizli Province, Turkey. Its area is 1,772 km^{2}, and its population is 54,888 (2022). It lies in high country between the Aegean and Mediterranean regions. A plain, watered by two reservoirs, known for growing melons and watermelons, on the road between the city of Denizli and Antalya. Its altitude is 895 m.

== Etymology ==
The name Acıpayam means bitter almond (payam being a loanword from Persian) in the local dialect, the town was formerly named and Garbikaraağaç.

== History ==
The plain has been settled since 2000 BC, and Hittites were here in 1500 BC, followed by the Ancient Greeks and more civilizations up to the Byzantines and then the arrival of the Turkish peoples. From 1097 the area was in the hands of the Seljuk Turks. Turkish rule was interrupted by the Crusades but afterwards was settled by the Oghuz Turks and eventually was absorbed into the Ottoman Empire.

== Climate ==
Acıpayam has a hot-summer Mediterranean climate (Köppen: Csa), with hot, dry summers, and cool, moderately wet, somewhat snowy winters.

Climate data for Acıpayam (1991–2020)
Month	Jan	Feb	Mar	Apr	May	Jun	Jul	Aug	Sep	Oct	Nov	Dec	Year
Mean daily maximum °C (°F)	8.1 (46.6)	10.3 (50.5)	14.4 (57.9)	18.9 (66.0)	24.2 (75.6)	29.2 (84.6)	33.3 (91.9)	33.5 (92.3)	29.1 (84.4)	23.0 (73.4)	15.8 (60.4)	9.7 (49.5)	20.8 (69.4)
Daily mean °C (°F)	2.4 (36.3)	3.9 (39.0)	7.2 (45.0)	11.5 (52.7)	16.3 (61.3)	21.3 (70.3)	25.1 (77.2)	25.0 (77.0)	20.3 (68.5)	14.5 (58.1)	8.3 (46.9)	3.9 (39.0)	13.3 (55.9)
Mean daily minimum °C (°F)	−2.0 (28.4)	−1.2 (29.8)	1.1 (34.0)	4.7 (40.5)	8.9 (48.0)	13.1 (55.6)	16.6 (61.9)	16.6 (61.9)	12.0 (53.6)	7.5 (45.5)	2.6 (36.7)	−0.4 (31.3)	6.7 (44.1)
Average precipitation mm (inches)	86.68 (3.41)	64.35 (2.53)	56.57 (2.23)	43.69 (1.72)	40.61 (1.60)	24.16 (0.95)	12.76 (0.50)	15.22 (0.60)	18.52 (0.73)	32.33 (1.27)	56.4 (2.22)	81.17 (3.20)	532.46 (20.96)
Average precipitation days (≥ 1.0 mm)	7.1	6.7	6.4	6.4	6.0	4.0	2.2	2.7	2.9	3.9	5.2	7.5	61.0
Average relative humidity (%)	77.1	72.6	65.7	62.0	59.5	52.6	45.1	46.2	51.6	61.6	70.4	78.1	61.8
Source: NOAA

== Acıpayam today ==
As well as agriculture some of Denizli's textile industry has spread to Acıpayam too, where there is a cellulose factory. In the past the people would migrate seasonally to pick tobacco or cotton in other parts of Turkey, today this is not necessary.

== Places of interest ==
- Keloğlan Cave - a 145m long cave, open to visitors.

== Composition ==
There are 56 neighbourhoods in Acıpayam District:

- Akalan
- Akşar
- Alaattin
- Alcı
- Aliveren
- Apa
- Aşağı
- Avşar
- Bademli
- Bedirbey
- Benlik
- Boğazdere
- Çakır
- Çamlık
- Çiftlikköy
- Corum
- Çubukçular
- Darıveren
- Dedebağı
- Dodurgalar
- Eskiköy
- Gedikli
- Gölcük
- Gümüş
- Güney
- Hacıkurtlar
- Hisar
- Karahüyük
- Karaismailler
- Kelekçi
- Kırca
- Köke
- Kumavşarı
- Kurtlar
- Kuyucak
- Kuzören
- Mevlütler
- Oğuzköy
- Olukbaşı
- Ören
- Ovayurt
- Pınarbaşı
- Pınaryazı
- Sandalcık
- Sırçalık
- Suçatı
- Uçarı
- Yassıhüyük
- Yazır
- Yeni
- Yeniköy
- Yeşildere
- Yeşilyuva
- Yolçatı
- Yukarı
- Yumrutaş

== See also ==
- Acıpayam (sheep)
