= Akkonak, Merkezefendi =

Village in Turkey

Akkonak
- Neighbourhood
- Location in Turkey Akkonak (Turkey Aegean)
- Coordinates: 37.7753°N 29.0744°E
- Country: Turkey
- Province: Denizli
- District: Merkezefendi
- Population (2022): 16,979
- Time zone: UTC+3 (TRT)

Akkonak is a neighbourhood in the municipality and district of Merkezefendi, Denizli Province in Turkey. Its population is 16,979 (2022).
