= Çeltikçi, Merkezefendi =

Village in Turkey

Çeltikçi
- Neighbourhood
- Location in Turkey Çeltikçi (Turkey Aegean)
- Coordinates: 37.8712°N 29.0909°E
- Country: Turkey
- Province: Denizli
- District: Merkezefendi
- Population (2022): 177
- Time zone: UTC+3 (TRT)

Çeltikçi is a neighbourhood in the municipality and district of Merkezefendi, Denizli Province in Turkey. Its population is 177 (2022).
