= Hisar, Acıpayam =

Village in Turkey

Hisar
- Neighbourhood
- Country: Turkey
- Province: Denizli
- District: Acıpayam
- Population (2022): 680
- Time zone: UTC+3 (TRT)

Hisar (also: Hisarköy) is a neighbourhood in the municipality and district of Acıpayam, Denizli Province in Turkey. Its population is 680 (2022).
