= İnceğiz, Kale =

Village in Turkey

İnceğiz
- Neighbourhood
- Location in Turkey İnceğiz (Turkey Aegean)
- Coordinates: 37°31′40″N 28°37′04″E
- Country: Turkey
- Province: Denizli
- District: Kale
- Population (2022): 618
- Time zone: UTC+3 (TRT)

İnceğiz is a neighbourhood in the municipality and district of Kale, Denizli Province in Turkey. Its population is 618 as of 2022.
