= Bozburun, Merkezefendi =

Village in Turkey

Bozburun
- Neighbourhood
- Location in Turkey Bozburun (Turkey Aegean)
- Coordinates: 37.8318°N 29.0621°E
- Country: Turkey
- Province: Denizli
- District: Merkezefendi
- Population (2022): 288
- Time zone: UTC+3 (TRT)

Bozburun is a neighbourhood in the municipality and district of Merkezefendi, Denizli Province in Turkey. Its population is 288 (2022).
