= Cindere, Güney =

Village in Turkey

Cindere
- Neighbourhood
- Location in Turkey Cindere (Turkey Aegean)
- Coordinates: 38°06′25″N 29°03′40″E
- Country: Turkey
- Province: Denizli
- District: Güney
- Population (2022): 532
- Time zone: UTC+3 (TRT)

Cindere is a neighbourhood in the municipality and district of Güney, Denizli Province in Turkey. Its population is 532 (2022).
