= Gülbağlık, Kale =

Village in Turkey

Gülbağlık
- Neighbourhood
- Location in Turkey Gülbağlık (Turkey Aegean)
- Coordinates: 37°30′20″N 28°42′29″E
- Country: Turkey
- Province: Denizli
- District: Kale
- Population (2022): 1,133
- Time zone: UTC+3 (TRT)

Gülbağlık is a neighbourhood in the municipality and district of Kale, Denizli Province in Turkey. Its population is 1,133 (2022).
