= Caber, Sarayköy =

Village in Turkey

Caber
- Neighbourhood
- Location in Turkey Caber (Turkey Aegean)
- Coordinates: 37.9536°N 28.9896°E
- Country: Turkey
- Province: Denizli
- District: Sarayköy
- Population (2022): 192
- Time zone: UTC+3 (TRT)

Caber is a neighbourhood in the municipality and district of Sarayköy, Denizli Province in Turkey. Its population is 192 (2022).
