= Karaköy, Kale =

Village in Turkey

Karaköy
- Neighbourhood
- Location in Turkey Karaköy (Turkey Aegean)
- Coordinates: 37°29′52″N 28°50′24″E
- Country: Turkey
- Province: Denizli
- District: Kale
- Population (2022): 1,075
- Time zone: UTC+3 (TRT)

Karaköy is a neighbourhood of the municipality and district of Kale, Denizli Province, Turkey. Its population is 1,075 (2022). Before the 2013 reorganisation, it was a town (belde).
