= Kumavşarı, Acıpayam =

Village in Turkey

Kumavşarı
- Neighbourhood
- Country: Turkey
- Province: Denizli
- District: Acıpayam
- Population (2022): 986
- Time zone: UTC+3 (TRT)

Kumavşarı is a neighbourhood of the municipality and district of Acıpayam, Denizli Province, Turkey. Its population is 986 (2022). Before the 2013 reorganisation, it was a town (belde).
