= Eziler, Güney =

Village in Turkey

Eziler
- Neighbourhood
- Location in Turkey Eziler (Turkey Aegean)
- Coordinates: 38°11′43″N 28°56′51″E
- Country: Turkey
- Province: Denizli
- District: Güney
- Population (2022): 2,041
- Time zone: UTC+3 (TRT)

Eziler is a neighbourhood of the municipality and district of Güney, Denizli Province, Turkey. Its population is 2,041 (2022). Before the 2013 reorganisation, it was a town (belde).

In 1993, Eziler was granted municipal status and designated as a town. In 2012, Turkish law classified Eziler as a neighborhood.

== Overview ==
Eziler is 12 km (7.5 mi) from the district center, and 80 km (50 mi) from Denizli. The main economy of the village is animal husbandry and agriculture, particularly thyme and walnut farming. Despite being a rural village, Eziler attracts attention with the nationwide success it has achieved in a variety of sports.

== Sport village ==
Soon after his appointment to the village's Mustafa Kaçmaz Primary and Middle School in 2016, the physical education teacher Suat Arı took the initiative with the motto "Everyone in this village is an athlete", and introduced over a dozen different sports branches which are uncommon in Turkey.

It started with bocce and darts and later came skating. A total of 120 licensed students, including 45 girls, were introduced to over a dozen different sports branches, such as bocce, darts, softball, korfball, badminton, tennis, skating, baseball, field hockey, cricket, rugby, flag football, orienteering as well as Turkish traditional archery. In 2020, the "Güney Eziler Sports Club" was founded. The girls' floor hockey team representing the village has 15 members, and is coached by Burak Duman, the village school's physical education teacher and licensed hockey trainer; as there is no gym in the village, the girls train in open air. Members of the girls' hockey team played in the province selection team at the Anatolia Girls Floor Hockey League (Anadolu Yıldızlar Hokey Ligi), and were placed fourth among ten teams. They were invited by the Turkish Hockey Federation to the Inter Provincial Republic Hockey Cup, at which they were the runner-up team. The club represents the Denizli Province in three sports branches. Two boys and one girl from the village sports club were called up to the national team camp in 2021.

Teacher Arı also holds sport tournaments between village families. Sponsored by the Hacı Ömer Sabancı Foundation and the District Municipality of Güney, a golf cup tournament was held in July 2021 using golf equipment donated by expatriate villagers working abroad. One of the golfers, aged 67, played for the first time in his life. In November 2021, a Veteran Hockey Tournament was held in the school yard with sponsorship by the Sabancı Foundation. Eighteen villagers over 35 years of age took part, including a male player aged 60 and a female player aged 71. A field hockey friendly match between the teams Denizli Anadolu Pars and Güney Ezlier followed.
