= Darıveren, Acıpayam =

Village in Turkey

Darıveren
- Neighbourhood
- Location in Turkey Darıveren (Turkey Aegean)
- Coordinates: 37°16′29″N 29°27′41″E
- Country: Turkey
- Province: Denizli
- District: Acıpayam
- Population (2022): 1,216
- Time zone: UTC+3 (TRT)

Darıveren is a neighbourhood of the municipality and district of Acıpayam, Denizli Province, Turkey. Its population is 1,216 (2022). Before the 2013 reorganisation, it was a town (belde).
