= Esenkaya, Kale =

Village in Turkey

Esenkaya
- Neighbourhood
- Location in Turkey Esenkaya (Turkey Aegean)
- Coordinates: 37°23′29″N 28°40′24″E
- Country: Turkey
- Province: Denizli
- District: Kale
- Population (2022): 219
- Time zone: UTC+3 (TRT)
- Postal code: 20570

Esenkaya is a neighbourhood in the municipality and district of Kale, Denizli Province in Turkey. Its population is 219 (2022).
