= Kuyucak, Acıpayam =

Village in Turkey

Kuyucak
- Neighbourhood
- Location in Turkey Kuyucak (Turkey Aegean)
- Coordinates: 37°33′36″N 29°23′39″E
- Country: Turkey
- Province: Denizli
- District: Acıpayam
- Population (2022): 1,455
- Time zone: UTC+3 (TRT)

Kuyucak is a neighbourhood in the municipality and district of Acıpayam, Denizli Province in Turkey. Its population is 1,455 (2022).
