= Alaattin, Denizli =

Town in Turkey

Alaattin
- Neighbourhood
- Location in Turkey Alaattin (Turkey Aegean)
- Coordinates: 37°28′N 29°19′E
- Country: Turkey
- Province: Denizli
- District: Acıpayam
- Elevation: 900 m (3,000 ft)
- Population (2022): 2,151
- Time zone: UTC+3 (TRT)
- Postal code: 20820
- Area code: 0258

Alaattin is a neighbourhood of the municipality and district of Acıpayam, Denizli Province, Turkey. Its population is 2,151 (2022). Before the 2013 reorganisation, it was a town (belde). It is situated between Denizli and Acıpayam on Turkish state highway D.585. The distance to Acıpayam is 8 kilometres (5.0 mi) and to Denizli is 23 kilometres (14 mi). The settlement was named after Alaattin, a Turkmen tribe leader who founded the settlement in 15th century. In 1969 it was declared a seat of township. Agriculture is the main economic activity. Chromium mines which were active in 1950s are no more active. Some town residents work in European countries as guest workers.
