= Gölcük, Acıpayam =

Village in Turkey

Gölcük
- Neighbourhood
- Country: Turkey
- Province: Denizli
- District: Acıpayam
- Population (2022): 698
- Time zone: UTC+3 (TRT)

Gölcük is a neighbourhood of the municipality and district of Acıpayam, Denizli Province, Turkey. Its population is 698 (2022). Before the 2013 reorganisation, it was a town (belde).
