= Gölbaşı, Kale =

Village in Turkey

Gölbaşı
- Neighbourhood
- Country: Turkey
- Province: Denizli
- District: Kale
- Population (2022): 832
- Time zone: UTC+3 (TRT)

Gölbaşı is a neighbourhood of the municipality and district of Kale, Denizli Province, Turkey. Its population is 832 (2022). Before the 2013 reorganisation, it was a town (belde).
