= Duacılı, Sarayköy =

Village in Turkey

Duacılı
- Neighbourhood
- Location in Turkey Duacılı (Turkey Aegean)
- Coordinates: 37°53′57″N 28°57′14″E
- Country: Turkey
- Province: Denizli
- District: Sarayköy
- Population (2022): 1,646
- Time zone: UTC+3 (TRT)

Duacılı is a neighbourhood of the municipality and district of Sarayköy, Denizli Province, Turkey. Its population is 1,646 (2022). Before the 2013 reorganisation, it was a town (belde).
