= Göveçlik, Merkezefendi =

Village in Turkey

Göveçlik
- Neighbourhood
- Location in Turkey Göveçlik (Turkey Aegean)
- Coordinates: 37.786°N 28.965°E
- Country: Turkey
- Province: Denizli
- District: Merkezefendi
- Population (2022): 1,191
- Time zone: UTC+3 (TRT)

Göveçlik is a neighbourhood in the municipality and district of Merkezefendi, Denizli Province in Turkey. Its population is 1,191 (2022).
