= Aşağışamlı, Merkezefendi =

Village in Turkey

Aşağışamlı
- Neighbourhood
- Location in Turkey Aşağışamlı (Turkey Aegean)
- Coordinates: 37.9115°N 29.0296°E
- Country: Turkey
- Province: Denizli
- District: Merkezefendi
- Population (2022): 979
- Time zone: UTC+3 (TRT)

Aşağışamlı is a neighbourhood of the municipality and district of Merkezefendi, Denizli Province, Turkey. Its population is 979 (2022). Before the 2013 reorganisation, it was a town (belde).
