= Pınarkent =

- Neighbourhood
- Location in Turkey Pınarkent (Turkey Aegean)
- Coordinates: 37°48′N 29°13′E
- Country: Turkey
- Province: Denizli
- District: Pamukkale
- Elevation: 325 m (1,066 ft)
- Population (2022): 6,778
- Time zone: UTC+3 (TRT)
- Postal code: 20085
- Area code: 0258

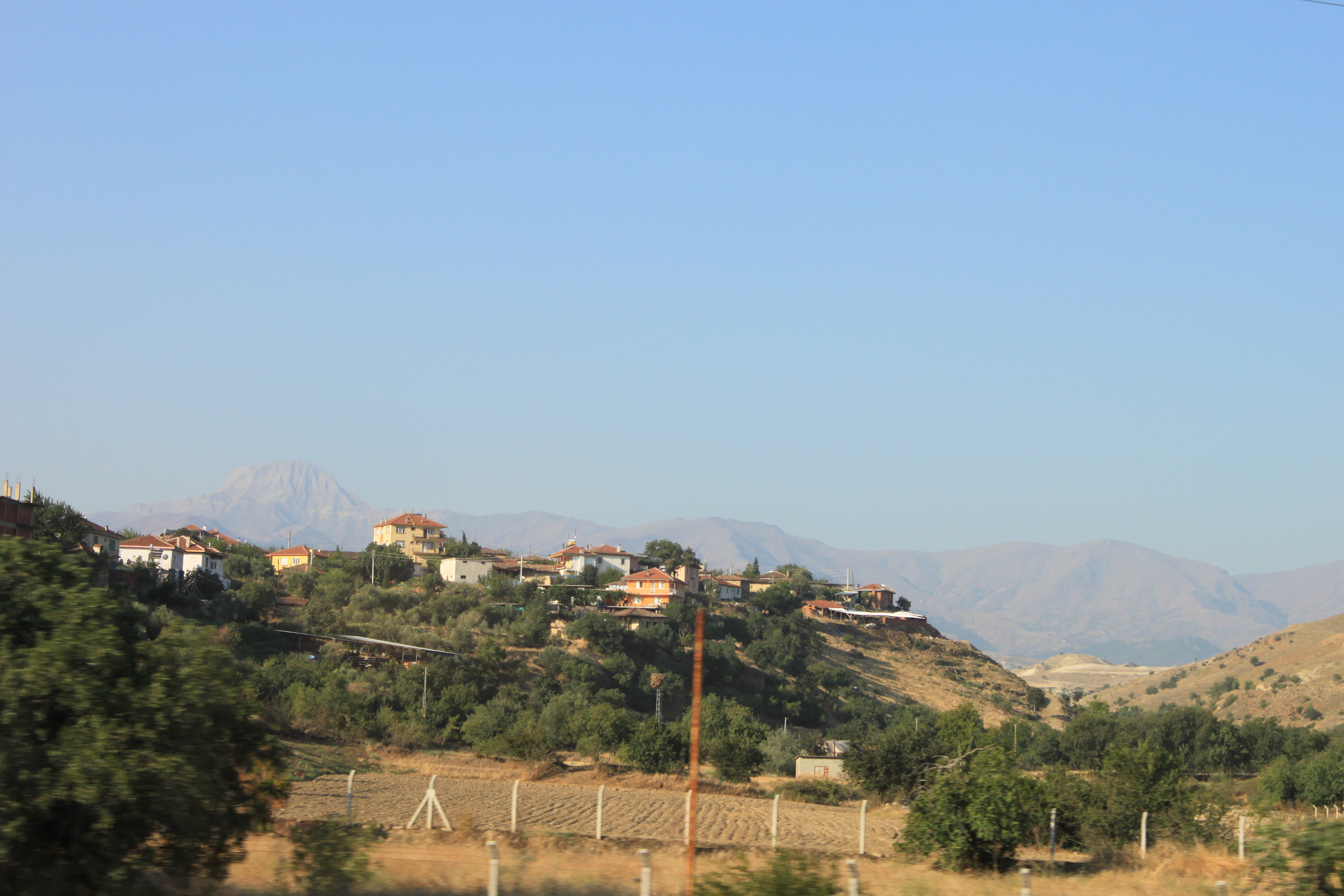

Pınarkent is a neighbourhood of the municipality and district of Pamukkale, Denizli Province, Turkey. Its population is 6,778 (2022). Before the 2013 reorganisation, it was a town (belde).

== Geography ==
The town is situated to the east of Denizli and Recep Yazıcıoğlu dam. It is both on the railway to İzmir and state highway D.320 to Aegean Sea coast. Distance to Denizli is 12 kilometres (7.5 mi).

== History ==
The probable origin of the population of the town is the Danishment tribe of Turkmens. The tribe was a nomadic tribe but in 1700s, the Ottoman government forced them to settle. After some clashes the tribe settled in what is now Pınarkent and they changed their primary source of income, from sheep breeding to agriculture. In the 20th century, after irrigation facilities were improved and mechanization was introduced, the settlement flourished and it was declared a township in 1992.

== Economy ==
Situated in the fertile plain, the town's economy depends on agriculture. But lately textile industry is replacing agriculture. Travertine mining is another profitable sector.
