= Karakurt, Pamukkale =

Village in Turkey

Karakurt
- Neighbourhood
- Location in Turkey Karakurt (Turkey Aegean)
- Coordinates: 37°45′54″N 29°07′48″E
- Country: Turkey
- Province: Denizli
- District: Pamukkale
- Population (2024): 1,037
- Time zone: UTC+3 (TRT)

Karakurt is a neighbourhood of the municipality and district of Pamukkale, Denizli Province, Turkey. Its population is 1,037 (2024).
