= Sarayköy =

- District and municipality
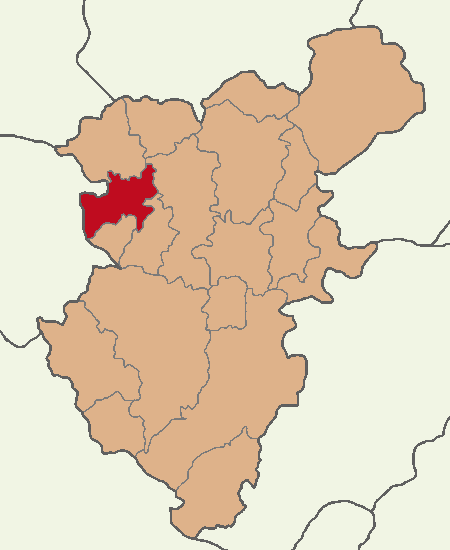
- Map showing Sarayköy District in Denizli Province

- Location within Turkey Location within Turkey Aegean
- Coordinates: 37°55′35″N 28°55′36″E
- Country: Turkey
- Province: Denizli

Government
  - Mayor: Mehmet Salih Konya (CHP)
- Area: 379 km^{2} (146 sq mi)
- Population (2022): 30,834
  - Density: 81.4/km^{2} (211/sq mi)
- Time zone: UTC+3 (TRT)
- Postal code: 20300
- Area code: 0258
- Website: www.saraykoy.bel.tr

Sarayköy is a municipality and district of Denizli Province, Turkey. Its area is 379 km^{2}, and its population is 30,834 (2022). It is 20 km west of the city of Denizli, on a plain between mountains and watered by Büyük Menderes River.

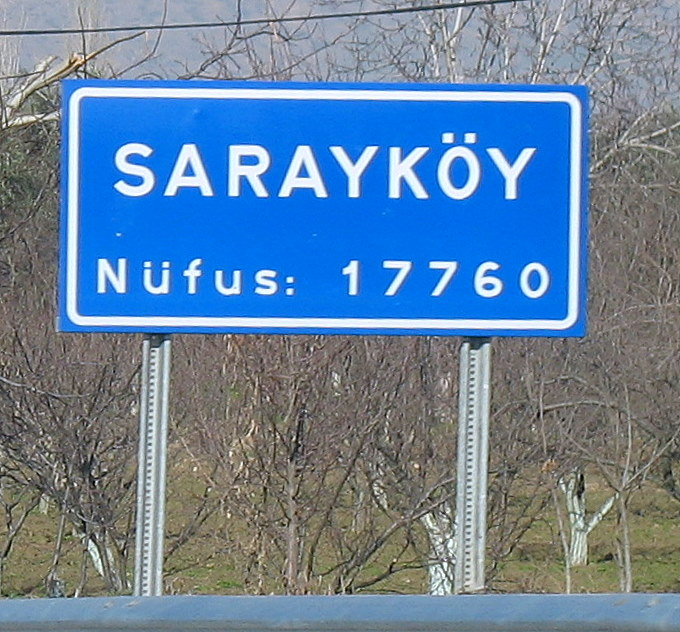
Road sign of Sarayköy city limit.

Sarayköy is at a high altitude inland from the Mediterranean and thus has hot dry summers and very cold winters. The mountain sides are mostly bare but there are ongoing forestry projects.

== History ==
The town was previously a village named Sarıbey after the Turkmen lord that settled his tribe here in the 14th century.

Sarayköy was an important point of resistance to the Greek Army in the Turkish War of Independence. Volunteers assembled here were able to defend the bridge across the River Menderes and thus prevent the Greeks from occupying the city of Denizli. There is a statue in the town of a fighter in local efe costume to commemorate this struggle.

== Composition ==
There are 32 neighbourhoods in Sarayköy District:

- Acıdere
- Acısu
- Adaköy
- Ahmetli
- Altıntepe
- Aşağı
- Atatürk
- Bala
- Beylerbeyi
- Caber
- Cumhuriyet
- Duacılı
- Gerali
- Hasköy
- Hisarköy
- Kabaağaç
- Karakıran
- Karataş
- Köprübaşı
- Kumluca
- Sakarya
- Sazak
- Sığma
- Tekke
- Tepeköy
- Tırkaz
- Tosunlar
- Trafo
- Turan
- Uyanık
- Yakayurt
- Yeşilyurt

== Sarayköy today ==
The major activity of the area is textile production (following in the footsteps of nearby Babadağ), mainly weaving but some printing and sewing of bedding and other home textiles.

5,000 homes in the town are heated with water run off from the geothermal power station in the village of Kızıldere, which was the first plant of its kind in Turkey. There are also plants near the power station making dry ice and bottling carbon dioxide. The plain is irrigated and mostly used for growing cotton and there is a large cotton storage and processing plant in the town. Other crops include figs, olives and apricots. Other activities include limestone quarrying and coal mining.

Sarayköy is also a market town for the surrounding countryside.

== Places of interest ==
- The Ahmetli Bridge over the Büyük Menderes river, 15 km from Sarayköy township, dates back to the Roman era. The middle section of the bridge was blown up by the Greek Army as a defensive measure during the Greco-Turkish War but was reconstructed with reinforced concrete later on.

== Notable natives ==
- Sezen Aksu, Turkey's leading modern singer and songwriter was born in Sarayköy.
