= Akalan, Acıpayam =

Village in Turkey

Akalan
- Neighbourhood
- Location in Turkey Akalan (Turkey Aegean)
- Coordinates: 37°22′20″N 29°21′19″E
- Country: Turkey
- Province: Denizli
- District: Acıpayam
- Population (2022): 2,041
- Time zone: UTC+3 (TRT)

Akalan is a neighbourhood of the municipality and district of Acıpayam, Denizli Province, Turkey. Its population is 2,041 (2022). Before the 2013 reorganisation, it was a town (belde).
