= Hacıeyüplü, Merkezefendi =

Village in Turkey

Hacıeyüplü
- Neighbourhood
- Location in Turkey Hacıeyüplü (Turkey Aegean)
- Country: Turkey
- Province: Denizli
- District: Merkezefendi
- Population (2022): 2,950
- Time zone: UTC+3 (TRT)

Hacıeyüplü is a neighbourhood of the municipality and district of Merkezefendi, Denizli Province, Turkey. Its population is 2,950 (2022).
