= Yassıhüyük, Acıpayam =

Village in Turkey

Yassıhüyük
- Neighbourhood
- Location in Turkey Yassıhüyük (Turkey Aegean)
- Coordinates: 37°30′40″N 29°19′52″E
- Country: Turkey
- Province: Denizli
- District: Acıpayam
- Population (2022): 1,143
- Time zone: UTC+3 (TRT)

Yassıhüyük is a neighbourhood of the municipality and district of Acıpayam, Denizli Province, Turkey. Its population is 1,143 (2022). Before the 2013 reorganisation, it was a town (belde).
