= Başkarcı, Merkezefendi =

Village in Turkey

Başkarcı
- Neighbourhood
- Location in Turkey Başkarcı (Turkey Aegean)
- Coordinates: 37.7651°N 28.9856°E
- Country: Turkey
- Province: Denizli
- District: Merkezefendi
- Population (2022): 2,998
- Time zone: UTC+3 (TRT)

Başkarcı is a neighbourhood of the municipality and district of Merkezefendi, Denizli Province, Turkey. Its population is 2,998 (2022). Before the 2013 reorganisation, it was a town (belde).
