= Akşar, Acıpayam =

Village in Turkey

Akşar
- Neighbourhood
- Location in Turkey Akşar (Turkey Aegean)
- Coordinates: 37°12′31″N 29°16′16″E
- Country: Turkey
- Province: Denizli
- District: Acıpayam
- Population (2022): 453
- Time zone: UTC+3 (TRT)

Akşar is a neighbourhood in the municipality and district of Acıpayam, Denizli Province in Turkey. Its population is 453 (2022).
