= Gözler =

- Neighbourhood
- Location in Turkey Gözler (Turkey Aegean)
- Coordinates: 38°07′N 29°09′E
- Country: Turkey
- Province: Denizli
- District: Pamukkale
- Elevation: 770 m (2,530 ft)
- Population (2022): 1,667
- Time zone: UTC+3 (TRT)
- Postal code: 20085
- Area code: 0258

Gözler is a neighbourhood of the municipality and district of Pamukkale, Denizli Province, Turkey. Its population is 1,667 (2022). Before the 2013 reorganisation, it was a town (belde). It is situated to the south of Büyük Menderes River (historical Maeander) and Adıgüzel Dam. The distance to Denizli is 50 kilometres (31 mi). The town was founded in 1971 at a different location. In 1976 it moved to its present location. Main agricultural product of the town is thyme.
