= Yumrutaş, Acıpayam =

Village in Turkey

Yumrutaş
- Neighbourhood
- Location in Turkey Yumrutaş (Turkey Aegean)
- Coordinates: 37°23′31″N 29°29′13″E
- Country: Turkey
- Province: Denizli
- District: Acıpayam
- Population (2022): 717
- Time zone: UTC+3 (TRT)

Yumrutaş is a neighbourhood of the municipality and district of Acıpayam, Denizli Province, Turkey. Its population is 717 (2022). Before the 2013 reorganisation, it was a town (belde).
