= Tosunlar, Sarayköy =

Village in Turkey

Tosunlar
- Neighbourhood
- Country: Turkey
- Province: Denizli
- District: Sarayköy
- Population (2022): 725
- Time zone: UTC+3 (TRT)

Tosunlar is a neighbourhood of the municipality and district of Sarayköy, Denizli Province, Turkey. Its population is 725 (2022). Before the 2013 reorganisation, it was a town (belde).
