= Çamlarca, Kale =

Village in Turkey

Çamlarca
- Neighbourhood
- Location in Turkey Çamlarca (Turkey Aegean)
- Coordinates: 37°27′53″N 28°50′00″E
- Country: Turkey
- Province: Denizli
- District: Kale
- Population (2022): 555
- Time zone: UTC+3 (TRT)
- Postal code: 20570

Çamlarca is a neighbourhood in the municipality and district of Kale, Denizli Province in Turkey. Its population is 555 (2022).
