= Gökçeören, Kale =

Village in Turkey

Gökçeören
- Neighbourhood
- Location in Turkey Gökçeören (Turkey Aegean)
- Coordinates: 37°22′42″N 28°43′50″E
- Country: Turkey
- Province: Denizli
- District: Kale
- Population (2022): 477
- Time zone: UTC+3 (TRT)
- Postal code: 20570

Gökçeören is a neighbourhood in the municipality and district of Kale, Denizli Province in Turkey. Its population is 477 (2022).
