= Sığma, Sarayköy =

Village in Turkey

Sığma
- Neighbourhood
- Location in Turkey Sığma (Turkey Aegean)
- Coordinates: 37°55′N 28°58′E
- Country: Turkey
- Province: Denizli
- District: Sarayköy
- Population (2022): 765
- Time zone: UTC+3 (TRT)

Sığma is a neighbourhood of the municipality and district of Sarayköy, Denizli Province, Turkey. Its population is 765 (2022). Before the 2013 reorganisation, it was a town (belde).
