= Oğuzköy, Acıpayam =

Village in Turkey

Oğuzköy
- Neighbourhood
- Location in Turkey Oğuzköy (Turkey Aegean)
- Coordinates: 37°27′22″N 29°20′30″E
- Country: Turkey
- Province: Denizli
- District: Acıpayam
- Population (2022): 763
- Time zone: UTC+3 (TRT)

Oğuzköy is a neighbourhood in the municipality and district of Acıpayam, Denizli Province in Turkey. Its population is 763 (2022).
