= Kırca, Acıpayam =

Village in Turkey

Kırca
- Neighbourhood
- Country: Turkey
- Province: Denizli
- District: Acıpayam
- Population (2022): 238
- Time zone: UTC+3 (TRT)

Kırca is a neighbourhood in the municipality and district of Acıpayam, Denizli Province in Turkey. Its population is 238 (2022).
