= Kale, Denizli =

Kale
- District and municipality
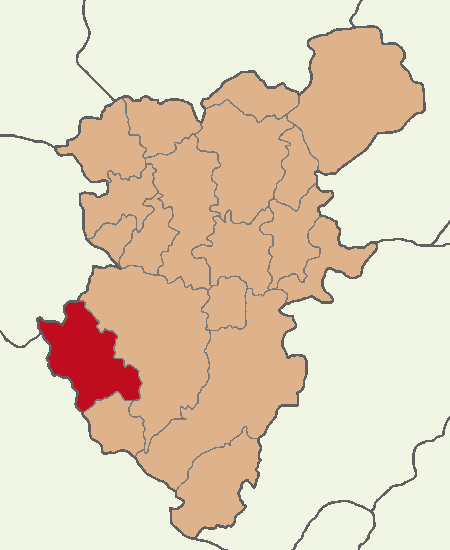
- Map showing Kale District in Denizli Province

- Location in Turkey Kale (Turkey Aegean)
- Coordinates: 37°26′21″N 28°50′43″E
- Country: Turkey
- Province: Denizli

Government
  - Mayor: Erkan Hayla (CHP)
- Area: 684 km^{2} (264 sq mi)
- Elevation: 1,055 m (3,461 ft)
- Population (2022): 19,202
  - Density: 28.1/km^{2} (72.7/sq mi)
- Time zone: UTC+3 (TRT)
- Postal code: 20570
- Area code: 0258
- Website: www.kale.bel.tr

Kale is a municipality and district of Denizli Province, Turkey. Its area is 684 km^{2}, and its population is 19,202 (2022). It is near the town of Tavas. Kale is a 45-minute drive from Denizli on the road from the city of Denizli to the Aegean city of Muğla. The mayor is Erkan Hayla (CHP), elected in 2024.

The climate is hot in summer, cold in winter and being high up the summer evenings are cool as well.

== History ==
Kale means castle in Turkish and in antiquity the castle of Tabae (or Tabai, Taba Tabenon) stood high on a rock commanding a mountain pass (although there are many places called Tabae and it may be that this was simply the word for rock.) The castle was apparently built by the followers of Alexander the Great, and coinage was minted here in the Hellenistic and Roman periods.

The area remained under Byzantine rule until the beginning of the 12th century when it fell to the Seljuk Turks, who ruled until the late 13th century, when Seljuk power was weakened in the wake of Mongol invasion. The area was brought into the Ottoman Empire in 1424 by Murat II.

== Composition ==
There are 32 neighbourhoods in Kale District:

- Adamharmanı
- Alanyurt
- Belenköy
- Çakırbağ
- Çamlarca
- Cevherpaşa
- Cumhuriyet
- Demirciler
- Doğanköy
- Esenkaya
- Gökçeören
- Gölbaşı
- Gülbağlık
- Habipler
- Hürriyet
- İnceğiz
- Karaköy
- Karayayla
- Kayabaşı
- Kırköy
- Koçarboğazı
- Köprübaşı
- Künar
- Muslugüme
- Narlı
- Ortaköy
- Ortatepe
- Özlüce
- Toki
- Uluçam
- Yenidere
- Yeniköy

== Kale today ==
Kale is famous for growing tobacco and peppers and they have an annual pepper harvest festival.
