= Dagliç sheep =

Breed of sheep

The Dagliç is a breed of sheep found primarily in western Anatolia in Turkey. They are a carpet wool breed used for both meat and dairy production. Sheep of this breed typically have black spots on the head and legs. The rams are usually horned and the ewes are polled. The breed is thought by some to be the origin of the Chios and Kamakuyruk breeds.

== Characteristics ==
This breed of sheep has been adapted to live in steppe climate. They are unicolored with a white body and black spots on head and legs. Dagliç sheep have a short-fat tail. Live birth is 80 - 90% and twinning is rare (1 - 2%). Average weight gain is approximately 179 g (6.3 oz) per day. At maturity, ewes grow to approximately 60 cm (24 in) at the withers and weigh 37.5 kg (83 lb). Lactation yields about 40–50 kg (88–110 lb) of milk and lasts for about 140 – 179 days.
