= Qaraqurdlu =

- Municipality
- Location within Azerbaijan
- Coordinates: 41°27′N 48°50′E
- Country: Azerbaijan
- Rayon: Khachmaz

Population
  - Total: 3,032
- Time zone: UTC+4 (AZT)
  - Summer (DST): UTC+5 (AZT)

Qaraqurdlu (also, Qaraqurtlu, Karakurtlu, and Karakurtly) is a village and municipality in the Khachmaz Rayon of Azerbaijan. It has a population of 3,032. The municipality consists of the villages of Qaraqurdlu, Hacıqurbanoba, and Gülalan.
