= Ahmetli, Sarayköy =

Village in Turkey

Ahmetli
- Neighbourhood
- Location in Turkey Ahmetli (Turkey Aegean)
- Coordinates: 37.9864°N 28.9792°E
- Country: Turkey
- Province: Denizli
- District: Sarayköy
- Population (2022): 494
- Time zone: UTC+3 (TRT)

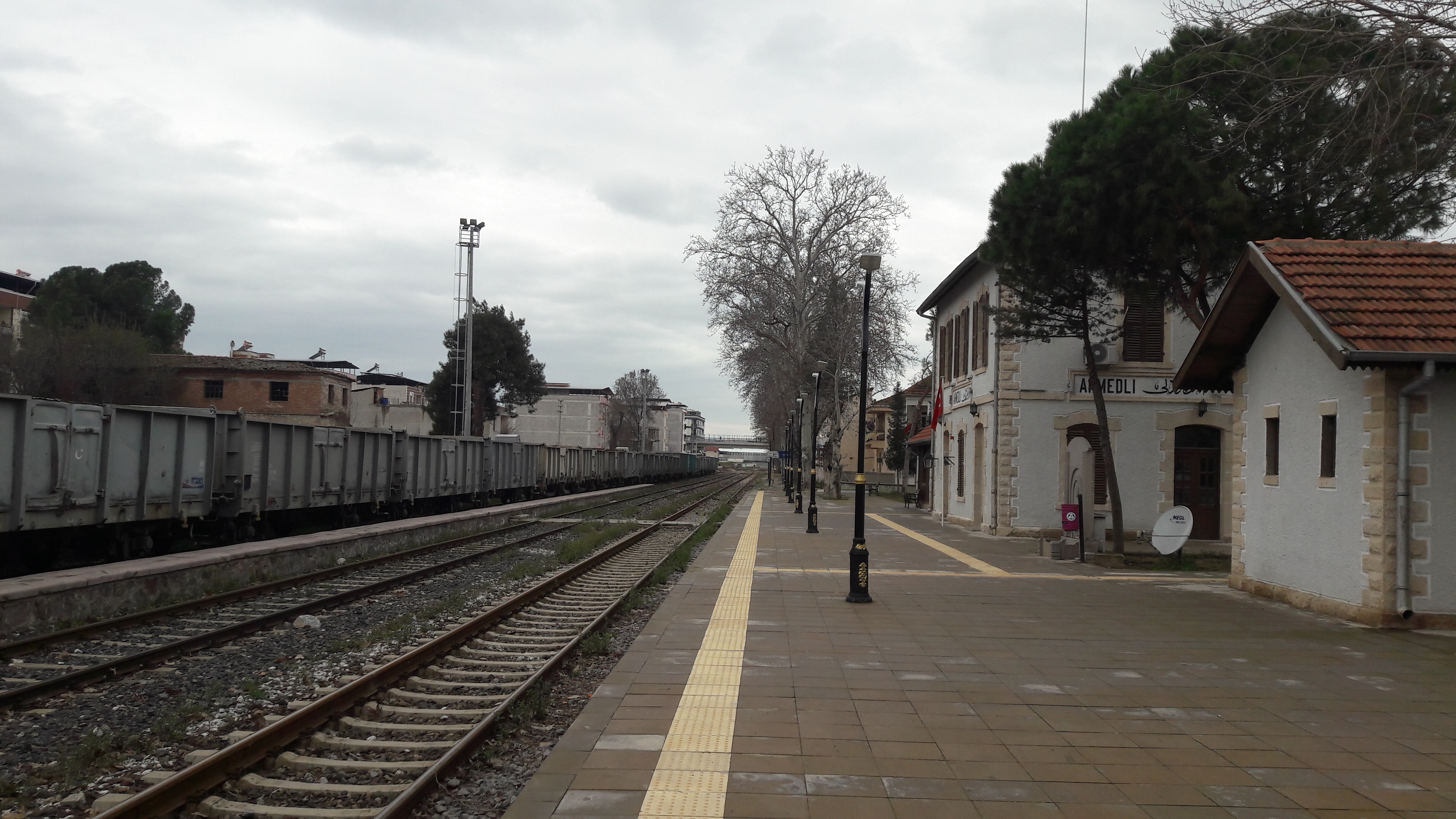
Ahmetli railway station, looking east. (toward Afyon)

Ahmetli is a neighbourhood of the municipality and district of Sarayköy, Denizli Province, Turkey. Its population is 494 (2022). Before the 2013 reorganisation, it was a town (belde).
