= Altıntop, Merkezefendi =

Village in Turkey

Altıntop
- Neighbourhood
- Location in Turkey Altıntop (Turkey Aegean)
- Coordinates: 37.7734°N 29.0858°E
- Country: Turkey
- Province: Denizli
- District: Merkezefendi
- Population (2022): 3,422
- Time zone: UTC+3 (TRT)

Altıntop is a neighbourhood in the municipality and district of Merkezefendi, Denizli Province in Turkey. Its population is 3,422 (2022).
