= Dedebağı =

Town in Turkey

- Neighbourhood
- Location in Turkey Dedebağı (Turkey Aegean)
- Coordinates: 37°18′N 29°27′E
- Country: Turkey
- Province: Denizli
- District: Acıpayam
- Elevation: 930 m (3,050 ft)
- Population (2022): 1,729
- Time zone: UTC+3 (TRT)
- Postal code: 20840
- Area code: 0258

Dedebağı (formerly: Derasül) is a neighbourhood of the municipality and district of Acıpayam, Denizli Province, Turkey. Its population is 1,729 (2022). Before the 2013 reorganisation, it was a town (belde). It is situated to the west of Dalaman creek. The distance to Acıpayam is 17 kilometres (11 mi) and to Denizli is 76 kilometres (47 mi). The original name of the settlement Derasül refers to a certain Derasül Bey who migrated from Greater Khorasan to Dedebağ about eight centuries ago. In 1968, it was declared the seat of its township.
