= Dodurgalar, Acıpayam =

Village in Turkey

Dodurgalar
- Neighbourhood
- Location in Turkey Dodurgalar (Turkey Aegean)
- Coordinates: 37°23′N 29°34′E
- Country: Turkey
- Province: Denizli
- District: Acıpayam
- Population (2022): 1,306
- Time zone: UTC+3 (TRT)

Dodurgalar (also: Dodurga) is a neighbourhood of the municipality and district of Acıpayam, Denizli Province, Turkey. Its population is 1,306 (2022). Before the 2013 reorganisation, it was a town (belde).
