= Diocaesarea (Cappadocia) =

Graeco-Roman town located in ancient Cappadoci

Coordinates: 38°25′49″N 34°44′23″E

Diocaesarea or Diocaesareia or Diokaisareia (Ancient Greek: Διοκαισάρεια) was a Graeco-Roman town located in ancient Cappadocia near Nazianzus. According to Gregorius of Nazianzus, it was a small place. It is mentioned by Ptolemy and by Pliny the Elder.

Its site is located near Til (formerly Kaysar, reflecting the old name) in Asiatic Turkey.
