= Yazır, Acıpayam =

Village in Turkey

Yazır
- Neighbourhood
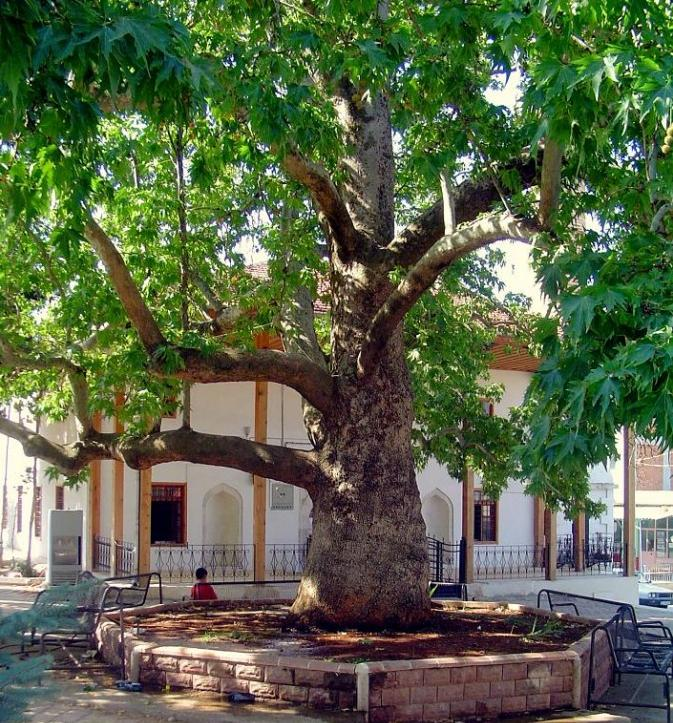

- Location within Turkey Location within Turkey Aegean
- Coordinates: 37°21′53″N 29°33′34″E
- Country: Turkey
- Province: Denizli
- District: Acıpayam
- Population (2022): 1,358
- Time zone: UTC+3 (TRT)

Yazır is a neighbourhood of the municipality and district of Acıpayam, Denizli Province, Turkey. Its population is 1,358 (2022). Before the 2013 reorganisation, it was a town (belde).
