= Kurt Kara =

New Zealand rugby league footballer

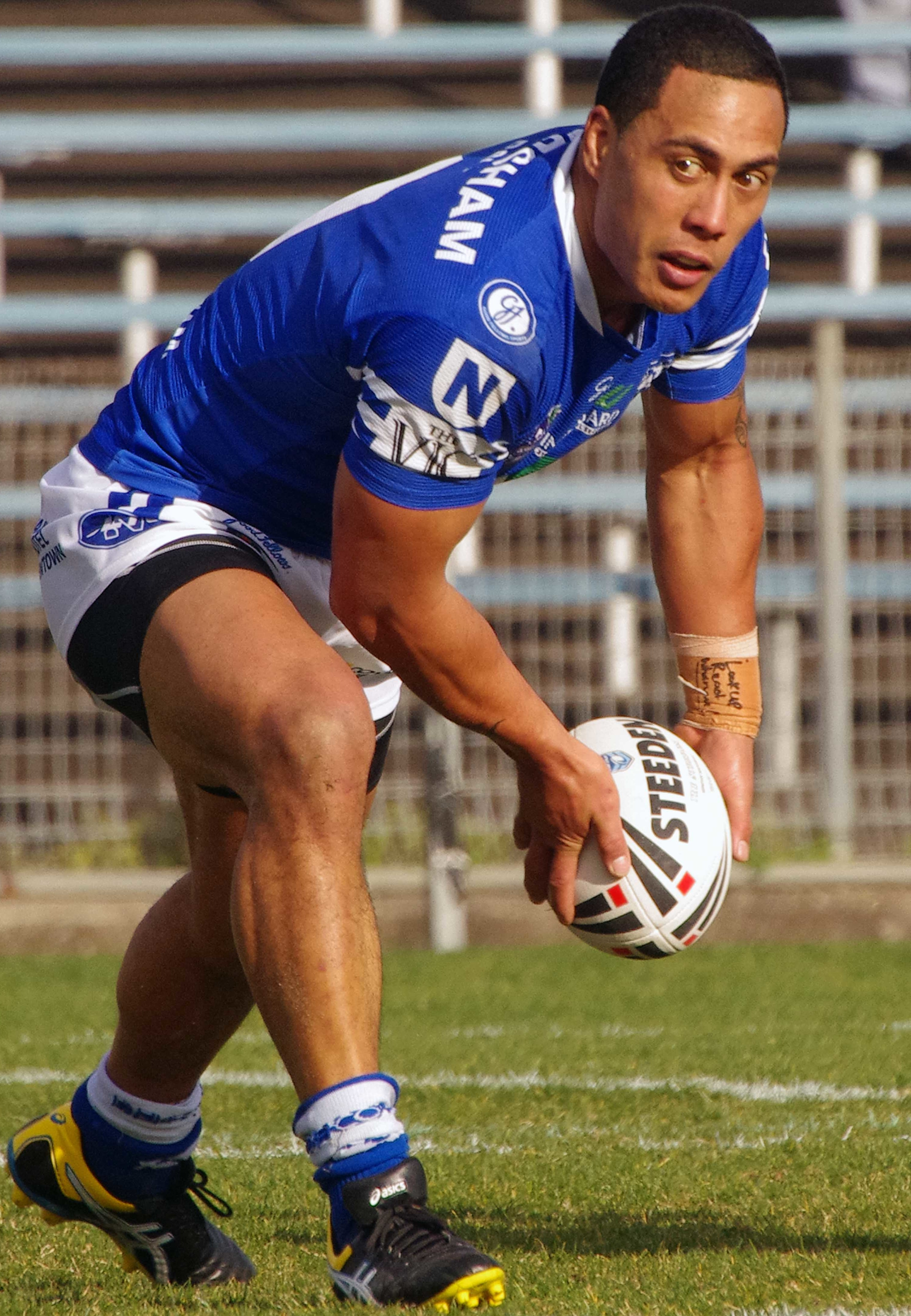

Personal information
- Born: 26 June 1989 (age 37) Cambridge, New Zealand
- Height: 185 cm (6 ft 1 in)
- Weight: 95 kg (14 st 13 lb)

Playing information
- Position: Halfback, Hooker
Representative
Years	Team	Pld	T	G	FG	P
	New Zealand Māori

Kurt Kara (born 26 June 1989) is a New Zealand former professional rugby league footballer who played for the Newtown Jets in the New South Wales Cup, as a halfback or hooker.

== Early years ==
Kara was born in Cambridge, New Zealand. He played his junior rugby league for the Cambridge Raiders. He is affiliated to the Ngāti Korokī Kahukura and Te pai o Raukawa iwi. He played for the Turangawaewae club, the Waicoa Bay Stallions and the New Zealand and New Zealand Māori under-18 sides.

He attended St John's College.

== Playing career ==
Kara was a member of the New Zealand Warriors under 20's squad in 2008 and 2009 before signing on with then NSW Cup side the Western Suburbs Magpies in 2010. In 2011, Kara signed with the Newtown Jets.

In the 2012 NSW Cup season, Kara was part of the Newtown side which won the competition that year and played in the grand final win over the Balmain Tigers. Newtown won the match 22–18. At seasons end, Kara also won the clubs ""Person of the year" award.

In 2013, Kara won Newtown's Best and Fairest award. He also represented New Zealand Māori when they hosted the Murri Queensland Indigenous side.

He trained with the Sydney Roosters in the 2014 pre-season. In 2014 he was selected as part of the New Zealand Māori side that toured Queensland to play two matches against the Murri Queensland Indigenous team.

On 16 October 2016, Kara played for the NZ Maori XIII against the NZ Residents. The NZ Residents won the match 30–10.

On 22 July 2017, Kara played his 150th game for Newtown against the New Zealand Warriors at Henson Park. Newtown won the match 38–12. It was the first time a player had played in 150 games for Newtown in reserve grade.

He retired at the end of the 2017 season, returning to Hamilton.
