= Karayayla, Kale =

Village in Turkey

Karayayla
- Neighbourhood
- Country: Turkey
- Province: Denizli
- District: Kale
- Population (2022): 229
- Time zone: UTC+3 (TRT)

Karayayla is a neighbourhood in the municipality and district of Kale, Denizli Province in Turkey. Its population is 229 (2022).
