= Kelekçi, Acıpayam =

Village in Turkey

Kelekçi
- Neighbourhood
- Location in Turkey Kelekçi (Turkey Aegean)
- Coordinates: 37°14′27″N 29°18′15″E
- Country: Turkey
- Province: Denizli
- District: Acıpayam
- Population (2022): 1,310
- Time zone: UTC+3 (TRT)

Kelekçi is a neighbourhood of the municipality and district of Acıpayam, Denizli Province, Turkey. Its population is 1,310 (2022). Before the 2013 reorganisation, it was a town (belde).
