= Ceretapa =

Graeco-Roman town of Phrygia Pacatiana

Coordinates: 37°29′37″N 29°55′34″E

Ceretapa or Keretapa (Ancient Greek: τὰ Κερέταπα), also called Diocaesarea or Diocaesareia or Diokaisareia (Διοκαισάρεια), was a Graeco-Roman town of Phrygia Pacatiana. It minted coins bearing the demonym Κερεταπεύς. The coins also show that there was near it a river or fountain Aulindenus. It was a bishopric with Silvanus representing the city at the Council of Ephesus, 431. No longer the seat a residential bishop, it remains a titular see of the Roman Catholic Church.

Its site is tentatively located near Kayadibi in Asiatic Turkey.
