= Pamukkale, Denizli =

Municipality and district in Denizli Province, Turkey

Pamukkale Akköy
- District and municipality
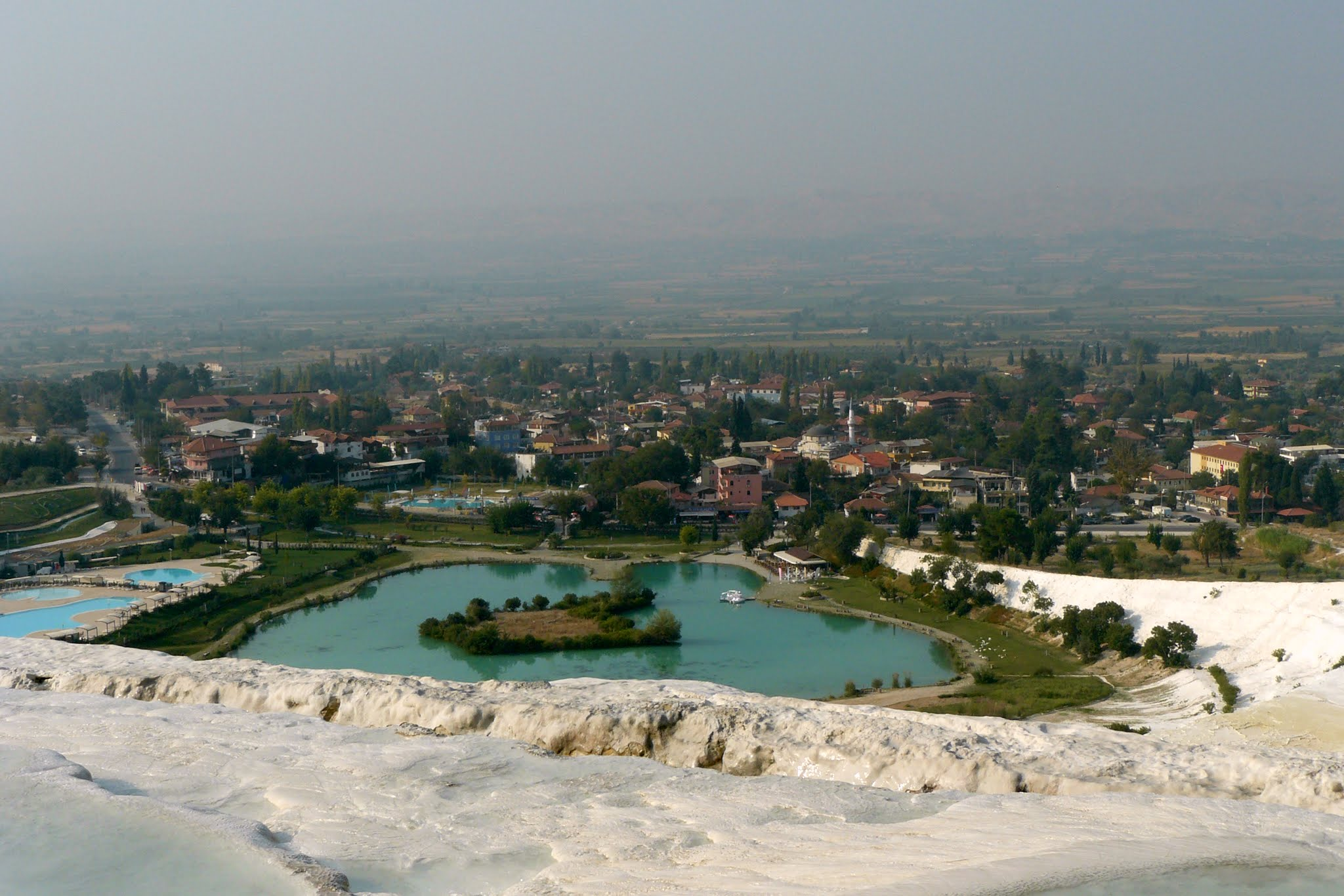
- A view of Pamukkale from the cotton terraces

- Logo

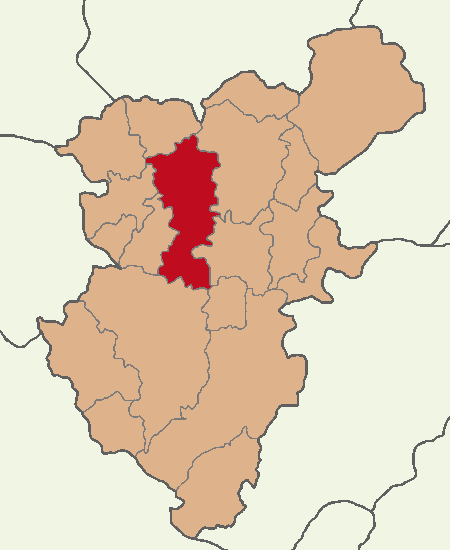
- Map showing Pamukkale District in Denizli Province

- Location within Turkey Location within Turkey Aegean
- Coordinates: 37°55′N 29°07′E
- Country: Turkey
- Province: Denizli

Government
  - Mayor: Ali Ertemür (CHP)
- Area: 823 km^{2} (318 sq mi)
- Elevation: 530 m (1,740 ft)
- Population (2022): 347,926
  - Density: 423/km^{2} (1,090/sq mi)
- Time zone: UTC+3 (TRT)
- Area code: 0258
- Website: www.pamukkale.bel.tr

Pamukkale, formerly known as Akköy, is a municipality and district of Denizli Province, Turkey. Its area is 823 km^{2}, and its population is 347,926 (2022).

It first came into existence with the fusion of two small villages, Aziziye and Sultaniye in reference to the 19th century Ottoman sultan, founded by Dagestani refugees of the Russo-Turkish War (1877-1878). It officially acquired the status of a village in 1935 and became a township with its own municipality in 1971. Akköy became a district center in 1990. As a part of the 2013 local government reorganisation, it absorbed part of the former central district of Denizli, and was renamed to Pamukkale.

Pamukkale center lies at a distance of 23 km from Denizli center, with which it shares the same plain. Pamukkale is notable for its thermal springs located in the nearby depending township of Gölemezli. These actually consist of four different springs close to each other in the same locality and one of the springs is used as a mud bath. They are reputed to be particularly beneficial for dermatological complaints. Pamukkale is within the usual touristic circuits covering Denizli center, the baths and the historic site of Pamukkale and the further baths of Karahayıt.

== Composition ==
There are 61 neighbourhoods in Pamukkale District:

- 15 Mayıs
- Akçapınar
- Akdere
- Akhan
- Akköy
- Aktepe
- Anafartalar
- Asmalıevler
- Atalar
- Bağbaşı
- Belenardıç
- Cankurtaran
- Çeşmebaşı
- Cumhuriyet
- Deliktaş
- Develi
- Dokuzkavaklar
- Eldenizli
- Eymir
- Fatih
- Fesleğen
- Gökpınar
- Gölemezli
- Goncalı
- Gözler
- Güzelköy
- Güzelpınar
- Haytabey
- Hürriyet
- İncilipınar
- Irlıganlı
- İstiklal
- Kale
- Kaplanlar
- Karahayıt
- Karakova, Pamukkale
- Karakurt
- Karataş
- Karşıyaka
- Kavakbaşı
- Kayıhan
- Kervansaray
- Kınıklı
- Kocadere
- Korucuk
- Küçükdere
- Kurtluca
- Kuşpınar
- Mehmetcik
- Pamukkale
- Pelitlibağ
- Pınarkent
- Siteler
- Tekke
- Topraklık
- Uzunpınar
- Yeniköy
- Yukarışamlı
- Yunusemre
- Zeytinköy
- Zümrüt
