= Battle of Tellidede =

1919 battle of the Greco-Turkish War

- Part of the Greco-Turkish War (1919–22)
Date	25–26 June 1919
Location	Tellidede ridges (Ovaemir-Yeniköy-Kadıköy line); (south of Aydın)
Result	Greek victory

Belligerents
(Kingdom of Greece) Greece	Kuva-yi Milliye

Commanders and leaders
Unknown	Selami Bey

Strength
800	200

Casualties and losses
30 killed and wounded	6 killed and a few wounded

Battle of Tellidede was a clash around Aydın, Turkey during the Greco-Turkish War (1919–1922). The Greek army planning to throw back the Turkish irregular forces around Aydın, started an offensive at the Tellidede ridges.

== Battle ==
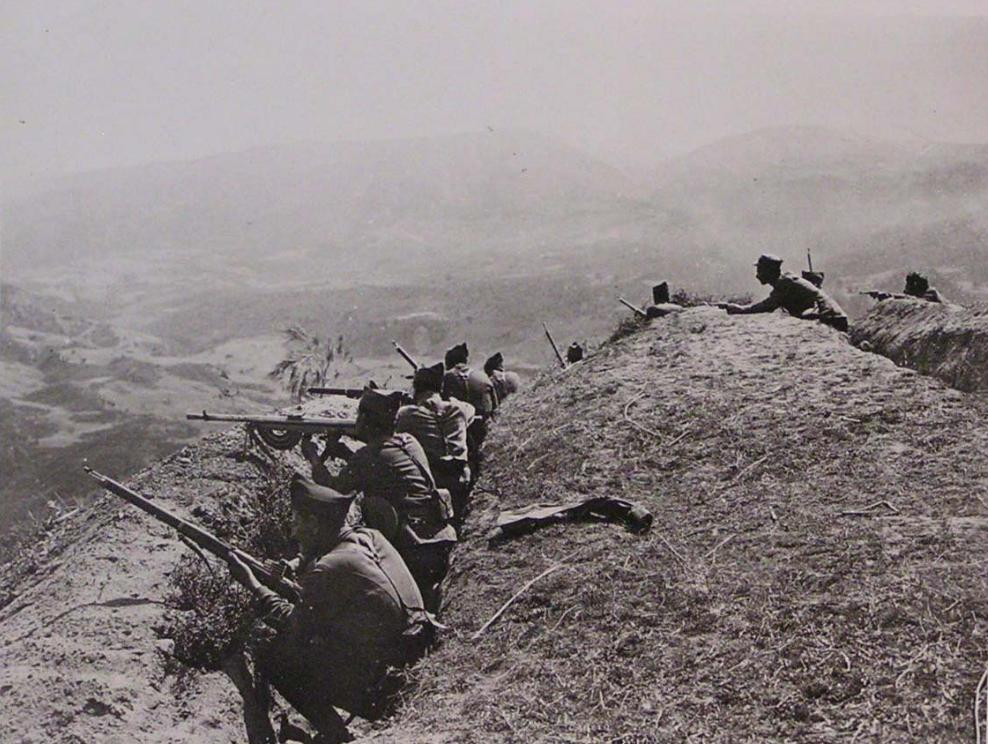
Greek troops, summer 1919

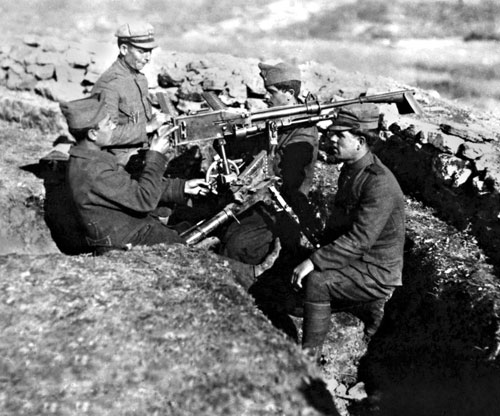
Greek machine gun team

On 25 June, the Greek troops attacked the Turkish forces, who were located at the Ovaemir-Yeniköy-Kadıköy line. The right flank, defended by the Karadurmuş platoon, faced heavy machine gun fire. The left flank was defended by volunteers from Çakırbeyli, Beydere and Selami Bey's Koçarlı platoon. The center area was defended by the Çineli Tahir platoon. The defending forces numbered 200 men. They faced a Greek battalion of 800 men supported by heavy machine guns. Soon the Turks started to run out of ammunition. Furthermore, the terrain was impractical for defense against a much larger force. Facing these problems they decided to abandon the area and retreated southern to the Büyük Menderes River.

== Result ==
The Greeks had suffered over 30 killed and wounded during their offensive, while the Turks had sustained 6 killed and a few wounded during their retreat. After the battle, the Greek troops burnt down Ovaemir, Yeniköy and Kadıköy. Most of the residents of these settlements had fled earlier, only the elderly and disabled had stayed there. They were killed by the Greek soldiers. The headpieces, covered in the blood, of the killed Turks were stuck on the top of the rifle bayonets and presented to the Turkish residents of Aydın.

== Sources ==
- Oğuz Gülcan, BATI ANADOLU’DA KUVAYI MİLLİYENİN OLUŞUMU (1919–1920), Ankara Üniversitesi Türk İnkılap Tarihi Enstitüsü, 2007, page 259-260 (Ankara University Open Archive System). (in Turkish)
