= Kızılcabölük =

Kızılcabölük can refer to:

- Kızılcabölük, Koçarlı
- Kızılcabölük, Tavas
