= Yeni =

Yeni can refer to:

- Yeni, Acıpayam, Turkey
- Yeni, Bago, Myanmar
- Yeni, Katha Township, Myanmar
- Yeni, Mahlaing Township, Myanmar
- Yeni, Tavas, Turkey
- Yeni language, a Mambiloid language of Cameroon
