= Iolla =

Ancient city of Aeolis, unlocated

Iolla (Ancient Greek: Ιολλα) was a town and polis (city-state) of ancient Aeolis. Its name does not appear in history, but is deduced from numismatic evidence consisting of coins dated to the 4th century BC on which the heads of Zeus or Athena and the inscriptions «ΙΟΛΛΑ» or «ΙΟΛΛΕΩΝ» appear. Louis Robert suggested that the Ollius River, named by Pliny the Elder when he describes the region of Aeolis, could be related to Iola, which perhaps took its name from the name of the river.

Its exact location is unknown although it is assumed to be near Adramyttium. Joseph Stauber has suggested that it might have been in Fughla Tepe, east of Burhaniye.
