= Jeanne Robert (historian) =

French historian and epigrapher (1910–2002)

- Born: Jeanne Ismérie Vanseveren; 31 December 1910; Houplines, France
- Died: 30 January 2002 (aged 91); Montrouge, France
- Spouse: Louis Robert (m. 1938; died 1985)

Academic work
- Discipline: Classical antiquity

Jeanne Ismérie Robert (French pronunciation: [ʒan ʁɔbɛʁ]; née Vanseveren; 31 December 1910 – 30 January 2002) was a French ancient historian, epigrapher, co-author and editor of many volumes on Greek epigraphy.

== Personal life ==
Robert was born Jeanne Ismérie Vanseveren on 31 December 1910, in Houplines. She married Louis Robert in 1938, and began collaborating with him from around that time until his death in 1985. She donated Robert's archive of documents, ranging from epigraphic squeezes to photographs of inscriptions and sites, to the Académie des inscriptions et belles-lettres in 1998. She entrusted Glen Bowersock with oversight over the documents' use for research, with the assistance of François Chamoux, Jean-Louis Ferrary and Béatrice Meyer. A separate archive of both the Roberts' archaeological activities in Turkey after the Second World War is kept at the library of the Institut national d'histoire de l'art.

She died on 30 January 2002, in Montrouge.

== Career ==
Robert was a specialist in modern and Ancient Greek, as well as Turkish. She began publishing the Bulletin épigraphique, a regular part of the journal Revue des Études Grecques, with Louis Robert from 1938 to 1984. She also worked with him on excavations, particularly at Amyzou and the sanctuary of Apollo at Claros, between 1946 and 1964, and collaborated with him on certain volumes of the series Hellenica.

== Selected bibliography ==
- (with Louis Robert) La Carie: histoire et géographie historique avec le recueil des inscriptions antiques (1954). Paris: Librairie d'Amerique et d'Orient, Adrien-Maisonneuve.
- (with Louis Robert) Fouilles d'Amyzon en Carie (1983). Paris: De Boccard.
- (with Louis Robert) Hellenica, Recueil d'épigraphie de numismatique et d'antiquités grecques, vol. VI (1948) Inscriptions grecques de Lydie.
- (with Louis Robert) Hellenica, Recueil d'épigraphie de numismatique et d'antiquités grecques, vol. IX (1950) Inscriptions et reliefs d'Asie Mineure.
- (with Louis Robert) Claros I: Décrets Hellénististiques (1989). Paris: Editions de Recherche surles Civilisations.
