= Tekeli =

Tekeli is a Turkish word derived from teke ("male goat"), and means "having or possessing goats; goaty". It may refer to

== Literature ==
- Tekeli (play), a play about the life of Hungarian nobleman Imre Thököly, written by Theodore Hook
- Tekeli-li, a cry of terror in Edgar Allan Poe's novel The Narrative of Arthur Gordon Pym of Nantucket
- Tekeli-li, a cry borrowed from Poe, in H. P. Lovecraft's novella At the Mountains of Madness

== People ==
- Tekeli (surname)

== Places ==
- Tekeli, Kazakhstan, a town in Karasay District
- Tekeli, Bozyazı, a town in Bozyazı district, Mersin Province, Turkey
- Tekeli, İzmir, a settlement in Menderes, İzmir, Turkey
- Tekeli, Koçarlı, a village in Aydın Province, Turkey
- Tekeli, Mut, a village in Mut district, Mersin Province
- Tekeli, Oltu

== Other uses ==
- Tekeli Mehmet Pasha Mosque, a mosque in Antalya, Turkey
- Tekeli (dance), a popular dance in early 19th-century Britain
