= Naxia (Caria) =

Town of ancient Caria

Coordinates: 37°33′10″N 27°39′33″E

Naxia (Ancient Greek: Ναξία) was a town of ancient Caria. It was a polis (city-state) and a member of the Delian League.

Its site is tentatively located near Bağarcık, Aydın Province, Turkey.
