= Mokolda =

Town of ancient Anatolia

Coordinates: 37°23′34″N 29°03′35″E

Mokolda was a town of ancient Anatolia, inhabited during Roman and Byzantine times. Its name does not occur among ancient authors, but is inferred from epigraphic and other evidence.

Its site is tentatively located near Moğlasın in Asiatic Turkey.
