= Jeanne Robert =

Jeanne Robert may refer to:

- Jeanne Robert (resistance member)
- Jeanne Robert (historian)

== See also ==
- Jeanne Robert Foster (1879–1970), American occultist
- Jean Robert, Belgian jazz saxophonist
