= Gündoğan =

Gündoğan (Turkish for sun falcon) may refer to:

== People ==
- İlkay Gündoğan (born 1990), German footballer of Turkish descent
- Nilüfer Gündoğan (born 1977), Dutch politician of Kurdish-Turkish descent
- Umut Gündoğan (born 1990), Turkish footballer

== Places in Turkey ==
- Gündoğan, Ardeşen
- Gündoğan, Bodrum
- Gündoğan, Buharkent
- Gündoğan, Ceyhan
- Gündoğan, Cide
- Gündoğan, Gönen
- Gündoğan, Koçarlı
- Gündoğan, Köşk
- Gündoğan, Oğuzeli
- Gündoğan, Polatlı
