= Amyzon (city) =

Ancient city in Turkey

Coordinates: 37.6087°N 27.711°E

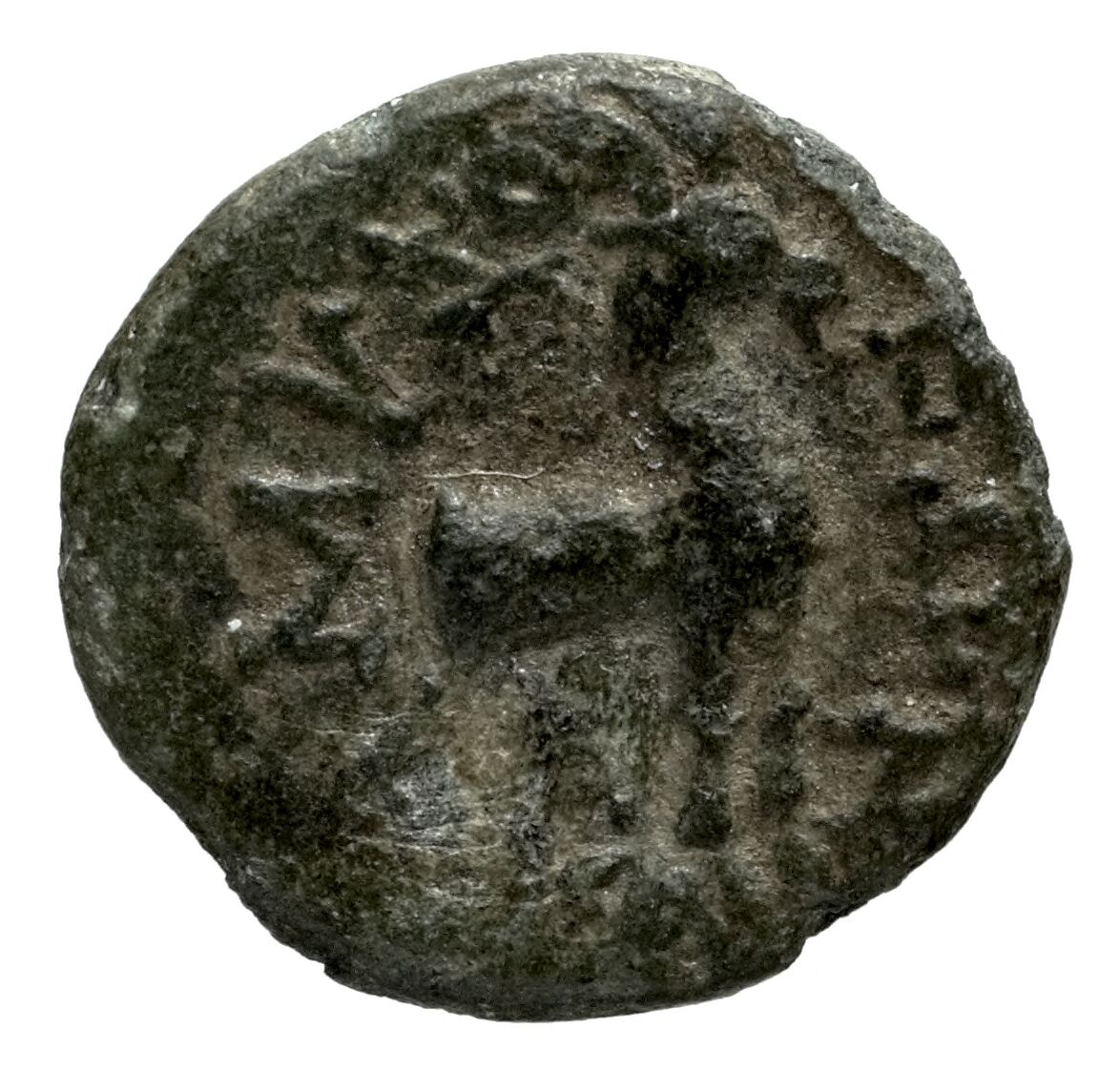
coin from Amyzon

Amyzon (Ancient Greek: Ἀμυζών) in Caria (now Mazin, Aydın Province between the villages of Akmescit and Gaffarlar, in Aegean Turkey) was an ancient city 30 km south of modern Koçarlı.

== History ==
The city was in the Athenian alliance in 405 BC.

Under the Seleucids, Amyzon was one of the cities in the Chrysaorian League of Carian cities that lasted at least until 203 BC, when Antiochus III confirmed the privileges of Amyzon. The League had a form of reciprocal citizenship whereby a citizen of a member city was entitled to certain rights and privileges in any other member city.

The city was dismissed by Strabo as a mere peripolion ('suburb' or 'township') of Alabanda; Amyzon was mentioned by Pliny, Ptolemy and Hierocles. In the wars among the successors of Alexander, in the 3rd century BC, the city allied with the less immediately threatening power, first with the Ptolemies, then with the Seleucids. In the second city it concluded an alliance with Heracleia under Latmos. On one occasion it sent a delegation to the oracle of Apollo at Clarus. The few coins identified as from the mint at Amyzon are Hellenistic and Imperial Roman.

== Remains ==
A stretch of the city wall stands 6 m high (in fact, the terrace wall of the shrine); inside it are a few ruined and unidentifiable buildings, as well as a row of a dozen large vaulted underground chambers, apparently storerooms. There are also Byzantine structures. Outside the city a series of ruined terraces mark the site of the Doric temple of Artemis, which dates from the time of the Hecatomnids: an architrave block has been found bearing a dedication by Idrieus. Numerous other inscriptions abound.

Amyzon was excavated by Louis Robert. Amyzon was mentioned in the Byzantine lists of bishops. No longer a residential diocese, it is today listed by the Catholic Church as a titular see.

== Bishopric ==
Amyzon is a titular see In the province of Caria; a suffragan to Stauropolis. It was a neighbour to the bishopric of Alinda.

=== Ancient bishops ===
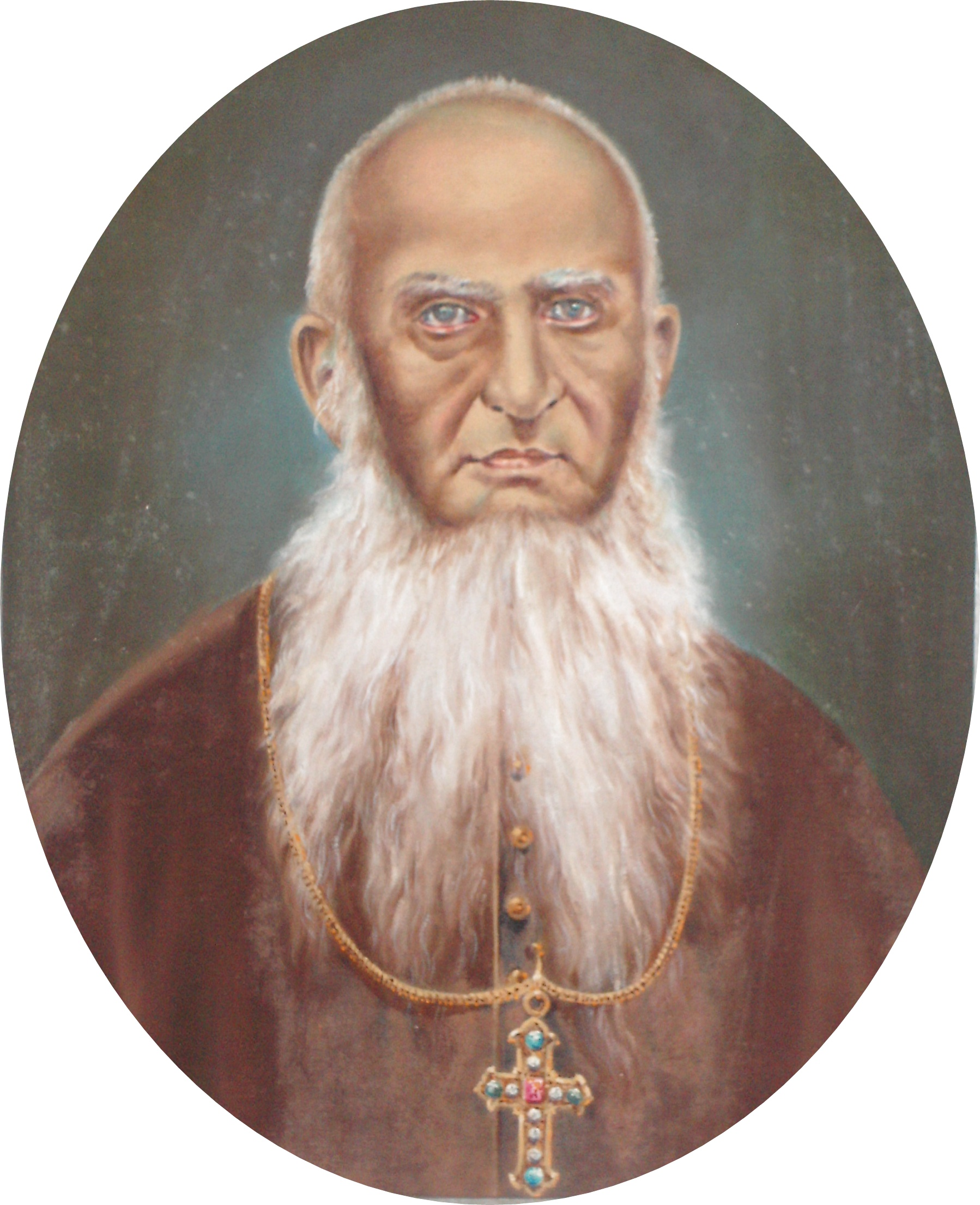
Bishop Borgna

- Philetus fl451

=== Titular Roman Bishops ===
- Jean Baptiste Gillis (3 Aug 1729 Appointed – 1 Dec 1736 Died)
- Charles Alexandre d'Arberg et de Valengin (31 Aug 1767 Appointed – 19 Dec 1785 Confirmed, Bishop of Ypres (Ieper))
- Godefroid Philippe Joseph de La Porte, (29 Nov 1790 Appointed – 9 Aug 1796 Succeeded, Archbishop of Naxos)
- Miguel Joaquín Matías Suárez, (20 Dec 1802 Appointed – 2 May 1831 Died)
- Franz Großmann (Grossmann) (17 Jun 1844 Appointed – 5 May 1852 Died)
- Ireneus Frederic Baraga (29 Jul 1853 Appointed – 9 Jan 1857 Appointed, Bishop of Sault Sainte Marie, Michigan)
- Józef Twarowski (3 Aug 1857 Appointed – 19 Jan 1868 Died)
- Ildefonso Giovanni Battista Borgna, (24 May 1871 Appointed – 14 Dec 1886 Appointed, Titular Archbishop of Marcianopolis)
- Heinrich Feiten (20 Sep 1887 Appointed – 17 Feb 1892 Died)
- Ignacio Ibáñez, (4 May 1893 Appointed – 14 Oct 1893 Died)
- Pio Gaetano Secondo Stella (22 Dec 1893 Appointed – 21 Sep 1927 Died)
- Gabriele Perlo, (22 Dec 1927 Appointed – 26 Sep 1948 Died)
- Charles Dauvin, (9 Dec 1948 Appointed – 28 Dec 1948 Died)
- Baltasar Álvarez Restrepo † (7 May 1949 Appointed – 18 Dec 1952 Appointed, Bishop of Pereira)
- Luigi Cicuttini (6 Apr 1953 Appointed – 30 Nov 1956 Appointed, Bishop of Città di Castello)
- Antonin Fishta, (17 Dec 1956 Appointed – 12 Jan 1980 Died)
