= Yukarıboğaz =

Yukarıboğaz can refer to:

- Yukarıboğaz, Tavas
- Yukarıboğaz, Yenipazar
