= List of shipwrecks in August 1838 =

The list of shipwrecks in August 1838 includes ships sunk, foundered, wrecked, grounded, or otherwise lost during August 1838.

== 1 August ==
List of shipwrecks: 1 August 1838
Ship	State	Description
Rajah Ranee	India	The East Indiaman, a barque, was wrecked off Calcutta with the loss of all but one of those on board.

== 2 August ==
List of shipwrecks: 2 August 1838
Ship	State	Description
Abeille	France	The ship was wrecked at Senegal. Her crew were rescued. She was on a voyage from St. Louis to Liverpool, Lancashire, United Kingdom.
Campbell	United Kingdom	The ship was driven ashore on Texel, North Holland, Netherlands. Her crew were rescued. She was on a voyage from Cette, Hérault, France to Hamburg. Campbell was refloated on 17 August and taken into Texel in a severely damaged condition.
Mastery	United Kingdom	The ship ran aground on the Goodwin Sands, Kent and was severely damaged. She was on a voyage from Antwerp, Belgium to Jersey, Channel Islands. Mastery was refloated and taken into Ramsgate, Kent.

== 5 August ==
List of shipwrecks: 5 August 1838
Ship	State	Description
Diligent	Flag unknown	The ship ran aground in the Scheldt and was damaged. She was on a voyage from Antwerp, Belgium to Saint Petersburg, Russia. Diligent was refloated the next day and resumed her voyage.
Union	United Kingdom	The brig was wrecked on Sanday, Orkney Islands. All on board survived. She was on a voyage from Stettin to Liverpool, Lancashire.

== 6 August ==
List of shipwrecks: 6 August 1838
Ship	State	Description
Aurora	Stettin	The ship was driven ashore at Boulogne, Pas-de-Calais, France. She was on a voyage from Gallipoli, Ottoman Empire to Stettin.
Eliza	United Kingdom	The ship was driven ashore at Youghal, County Cork. She was on a voyage from Youghal to London.

== 7 August ==
List of shipwrecks: 7 August 1838
Ship	State	Description
Falkland	United Kingdom	The ship was wrecked in the Gulf of Livonia. She was on a voyage from Stockton-on-Tees, County Durham to Saint Petersburg, Russia.

== 8 August ==
List of shipwrecks: 8 August 1838
Ship	State	Description
Gipsy	United Kingdom	The ship was driven ashore at Fraserburgh, Aberdeenshire. She was on a voyage from Liverpool, Lancashire to Rosehearty, Aberdeenshire. Gipsy was refloated on 11 August and resumed her voyage.
Jeune Louise	France	The ship ran aground on the Goodwin Sands, Kent, United Kingdom. She was on a voyage from Sunderland, County Durham to Blaye, Gironde. Jeune Louise was refloated and taken into Ramsgate, Kent.

== 9 August ==
List of shipwrecks: 9 August 1838
Ship	State	Description
Allandale	United Kingdom	The ship ran aground off Helsingør, Denmark. She was on a voyage from Newcastle upon Tyne, Northumberland to Saint Petersburg, Russia. She was later refloated and resumed her voyage.
Andrew White	United Kingdom	The ship capsized in the "Cul de Sac", Lower Canada, British North America. She was righted on 25 August and found to be severely damaged.
Earl of Durham	United Kingdom	The ship ran aground off Helsingør. She was on a voyage from Newcastle upon Tyne to Saint Petersburg. She was later refloated and resumed her voyaged.
Etats Unis	France	The schooner was wrecked on the Black Rock. Three crew were rescued by Moro Castle (United Kingdom).
Union	Prussia	The ship was lost off Eierland, North Holland, Netherlands. Her crew were rescued. She was on a voyage from Liebau to Marseille, Bouches-du-Rhône, France.

== 10 August ==
List of shipwrecks: 10 August 1838
Ship	State	Description
Grace	United Kingdom	The ship was driven ashore at Vado Ligure, Kingdom of Sardinia. She was on a voyage from London to Genoa, Kingdom of Sardinia and Livorno, Grand Duchy of Tuscany.
Ida Matilda	Stralsund	The ship foundered in the Kattegat. Her crew were rescued.
William	United Kingdom	The ship sprang a leak and put into Sal, Cape Verde Islands. She was on a voyage from the Cameroons to Liverpool, Lancashire. William was consequently condemned.

== 11 August ==
List of shipwrecks: 11 August 1838
Ship	State	Description
Assunto	Ottoman Empire	The ship was driven ashore on Neuwerk. She was on a voyage from Gallipoli to Hamburg.
Bispham	United Kingdom	The ship was driven ashore and wrecked near Holyhead, Anglesey. She was on a voyage from Trieste to Liverpool.
Eliza	United Kingdom	The ship was wrecked on Simon's Sand, between Schiermonnikoog and Rottumerplaat, Friesland, Netherlands. She was on a voyage from Newcastle upon Tyne, Northumberland to Cuxhaven.
Neptune	(United Kingdom of Great Britain and Ireland) Antigua	The drogher was driven ashore and wrecked in Royal Bay, Antigua.
Penelope	Netherlands	The ship was lost off Eierland, North Holland. Her crew were rescued. She was on a voyage from Venice, Kingdom of Lombardy–Venetia to Amsterdam, North Holland.
Vulcan	United Kingdom	The ship was driven ashore in Carnarvon Bay. She was on a voyage from Wexford to Liverpool. She was refloated on 20 August and taken into Holyhead.

== 13 August ==
List of shipwrecks: 13 August 1838
Ship	State	Description
Amity	United Kingdom	The ship was driven ashore near Dunkirk, Nord, France. Her crew were rescued. She was on a voyage from Newcastle upon Tyne, Northumberland to Jersey, Channel Islands. Amity capsized on 18 August and was wrecked.
Emilie	Netherlands	The ship was driven ashore near Hellevoetsluis, Zeeland. She was on a voyage from Frederikshavn, Denmark to Dordrecht, South Holland.
Isabella and Louisa	United Kingdom	The ship was wrecked on Langlee Island, Massachusetts, United States. Her crew were rescued. She was on a voyage from Quebec City Lower Canada, British North America to Sunderland, County Durham.
Victoria	Flag unknown	The ship was wrecked "Harboorne" or at "Starboorne", Denmark. Her crew were rescued. She was on a voyage from Bremen to Stettin.

== 14 August ==
List of shipwrecks: 14 August 1838
Ship	State	Description
Newham	United Kingdom	The ship ran aground off Büyükdere, Ottoman Empire.

== 15 August ==
List of shipwrecks: 15 August 1838
Ship	State	Description
Magnus	United Kingdom	The ship was driven ashore in the River Shannon. She was refloated on 3 September and taken into Kilrush, County Clare for repairs.

== 16 August ==
List of shipwrecks: 16 August 1838
Ship	State	Description
Argossy	United States	The ship was wrecked at Domesnes, Norway. She was on a voyage from Riga, Russia to an American port.
Elizabeth	Denmark	The sloop was run down in the Kattegat and was consequently beached at Ellekilde.
Elizabeth	(United Kingdom of Great Britain and Ireland) British North America	The ship was wrecked on the Cape Sack Shoals, off the coast of Nova Scotia.

== 17 August ==
List of shipwrecks: 17 August 1838
Ship	State	Description
Elizabeth	Prussia	The ship was in collision with a Russian ship and was consequently beached near "Hornbeck". She was on a voyage from Königsberg to King's Lynn, Norfolk, United Kingdom.

== 18 August ==
List of shipwrecks: 18 August 1838
Ship	State	Description
Gloria	United Kingdom	The ship was driven ashore near "Lalsterbo", Denmark. She was on a voyage from Pori, Grand Duchy of Finland to London.
Renown	United Kingdom	The schooner was run aground in The Swin, off the coast of Essex. She was on a voyage from London to Alloa, Clackmannanshire. Renown was later refloated and taken into Wivenhoe, Essex.

== 19 August ==
List of shipwrecks: 19 August 1838
Ship	State	Description
Courageux	France	The ship ran aground on the Tistlern, off the coast of Sweden, and sank. She was on a voyage from Havre de Grâce, Seine-Inférieure to Saint Petersburg, Russia.
Kingston	United Kingdom	The ship struck rocks off Spanish Head, Isle of Man and was consequently beached at Port St. Mary. She was on a voyage from Liverpool, Lancashire to Quebec City, Lower Canada, British North America.
Seaflower	(United Kingdom of Great Britain and Ireland) Jersey	The ship departed from Antigua for Arichat, Nova Scotia, British North America. No further trace, presumed foundered with the loss of all hands.
Victoria	(United Kingdom of Great Britain and Ireland) British North America	The ship was wrecked in Mall Bay, Lower Canada. All on board were rescued. She was on a voyage from an Irish port to quebec City.

== 20 August ==
List of shipwrecks: 20 August 1838
Ship	State	Description
Jane	United Kingdom	The ship sprang a leak and was beached at Grimsby, Lincolnshire. She was on a voyage from South Shields, County Durham to Middelburg, Zeeland, Netherlands.

== 21 August ==
List of shipwrecks: 21 August 1838
Ship	State	Description
Renown	United Kingdom	The ship was wrecked on the Cork Sand, in the North Sea off the coast of Essex. Her crew were rescued. She was on a voyage from Newcastle upon Tyne, Northumberland to London.
Weasel	United Kingdom	The cutter was driven ashore and wrecked near St David's Head, Pembrokeshire. Her crew were rescued.

== 22 August ==
List of shipwrecks: 22 August 1838
Ship	State	Description
Betsey	United Kingdom	The ship was driven ashore and damaged at Maryport, Cumberland. She was on a voyage from Belfast, County Antrim to Maryport. Betsey was refloated on 22 September and taken into Maryport.
Hive	United Kingdom	The ship was driven ashore in the Isles of Scilly. She was refloated the next day.
Hope	United Kingdom	The ship was driven ashore at Maryport. She was on a voyage from Dublin to Maryport. Hope was refloated on 5 September.
Jeune Olive	France	The sloop was driven ashore and wrecked at Boulogne, Pas-de-Calais with the loss of a crew member. Survivors were rescued by the Boulogne Lifeboat. She was on a voyage from La Rochelle, Charente-Maritime to Boulogneand Dunkirk, Nord.
Marys and Ann	United Kingdom	The ship ran aground off Jura. She was refloated on 27 August.
Oristella	Hamburg	The ship departed from Havana, Cuba for Hamburg. No further trace, presumed foundered with the loss of all hands.

== 23 August ==
List of shipwrecks: 23 August 1838
Ship	State	Description
Amity	United Kingdom	The ship was driven ashore and sank at Redcar, Yorkshire. Her crew were rescued. She was on a voyage from Great Yarmouth, Norfolk to Hartlepool, County Durham.
Autumn	United Kingdom	The ship ran aground in the River Towy. She was on a voyage from Carmarthen to Workington, Cumberland.
Mersey	United Kingdom	The ship ran aground in the River Foyle. She was on a voyage from Londonderry to Philadelphia, Pennsylvania, United States.

== 24 August ==
List of shipwrecks: 24 August 1838
Ship	State	Description
Ann and Eliza	United Kingdom	The sloop was abandoned in Loch Eriboll. She was on a voyage from Dingwall, Ross-shire to Loch Broom. Ann and Eliza was subsequently taken into Scrabster, Caithness.
Catherine	United Kingdom	The ship was driven ashore at Shoeburyness, Essex. She was on a voyage from London to Arkhangelsk, Russian Empire. Catherine was refloated the next day and resumed her voyage.
Emile	Belgium	The ship foundered off Brest, Finistère, France. Her crew were rescued. She was on a voyage from Antwerp to Barcelona, Spain.
Fire Sostrene	Denmark	The ship ran aground on the Riffshorn. She was on a voyage from Hull, Yorkshire, Ireland to Ribe. Fire Sostrene was later refloated and taken into Fanø.

== 25 August ==
List of shipwrecks: 25 August 1838
Ship	State	Description
Duke of Northumberland	United Kingdom	The ship was wrecked at Cape Agulhas, Africa. All on board were rescued. She was on a voyage from Madras, India to London.
Esk	United Kingdom	The ship ran aground on the Gar Sand, in the North Sea off the mouth of the River Tees. She was taken into Hartlepool, County Durham in a leaky condition and beached.
Portia	United Kingdom	The ship ran aground on the Gar Sand. She was taken into Hartlepool in a leaky condition and beached.
Salem	United Kingdom	The ship was driven ashore and wrecked at Redcar, Yorkshire. She was on a voyage from South Shields, County Durham to London.
Zaflora	France	The ship was wrecked on the Vanelian Reefs, off Martinique. Her crew were rescued. She was on a voyage from Manila, Spanish East Indies to Dunkirk, Nord.

== 26 August ==
List of shipwrecks: 26 August 1838
Ship	State	Description
Atalanta	United Kingdom	The ship stuck a sunken rock off Punta Galera, São Miguel Island, Azores. She was consequently beached. Atalanta was on a voyage from Gibraltar to São Miguel Island and Barbados.
Leao II	Brazil	The brig was driven ashore and wrecked on São Miguel Island.
Paquete de Bilbao	Spain	The ship departed from Havana, Cuba for Cowes, Isle of Wight, United Kingdom. No further trace, presumed foundered with the loss of all hands.
Sarah and Eliza	United Kingdom	The ship foundered in the North Sea. Her crew were rescued by Arrow (United Kingdom). She was on a voyage from Memel, Prussia to Porto, Portugal. Sarah and Eliza came ashore on Terschelling, Friesland, Netherlands on 30 August.

== 27 August ==
List of shipwrecks: 27 August 1838
Ship	State	Description
Lady Hannah Ellice	United Kingdom	The ship was wrecked on The Triangles. She was on a voyage from British Honduras to London.
Trafalgar	United Kingdom	The schooner was wrecked on the West Mouse Rocks, in the Irish Sea with the loss of three of her five crew. Survivors were rescued by the Cemlyn Lifeboat. She was on a voyage from Dublin to Amlwch, Anglesey, or Antwerp, Belgium.

== 28 August ==
List of shipwrecks: 28 August 1838
Ship	State	Description
Keith Douglas	United Kingdom	The sloop was driven ashore and wrecked at Downie Point, Aberdeenshire. Her crew were rescued. She was on a voyage from Dingwall, Ross-shire to Newcastle upon Tyne, Northumberland.

== 29 August ==
List of shipwrecks: 29 August 1838
Ship	State	Description
D'Auvergne	(United Kingdom of Great Britain and Ireland) Jersey	The ship was driven ashore on Alderney, Channel Islands. She was on a voyage from Jersey to London. D'Auvergne was later refloated and resumed her voyage.
Foggy	United Kingdom	The ship was wrecked on the Knock Sand, in the North Sea with the loss of all hands. she was on a voyage from Sunderland, County Durham to Wisbech, Cambridgeshire.
Isabella	United Kingdom	The ship was driven ashore at Redcar, Yorkshire. Her crew were rescued. She was on a voyage from Staithes, Yorkshire to Hartlepool, County Durham.
Unicorn	United Kingdom	The ship was driven ashore and wrecked near "Kramaia Gorka", Russia. She was later refloated and was taken into Kronstadt on 15 May 1839.

== 30 August ==
List of shipwrecks: 30 August 1838
Ship	State	Description
Aberdeenshire	United Kingdom	The ship departed from Surabaya, Netherlands East Indies for Canton, China. No further trace, presumed foundered with the loss of all seventeen people on board.
Fenella	United Kingdom	The ship departed from St. Jago de Cuba, Cuba for Swansea, Glamorgan. No further trace, presumed foundered with the loss of all hands.
Maria Johanna	Netherlands	The ship was driven ashore at Egmond aan Zee, North Holland. Her crew were rescued. She was on a voyage from Amsterdam, North Holland to Hull, Yorkshire, United Kingdom.
Martha	United Kingdom	The ship was driven ashore and wrecked south of Mundesley, Norfolk with the loss of a crew member. She was on a voyage from London to Leeds, Yorkshire.
Nestor	(Russian Empire) Grand Duchy of Finland	The ship sprang a leak, capsized and was abandoned in the North Sea off Ostend, West Flanders, Belgium. Her eleven crew were rescued by Diana(United Kingdom). She was on a voyage from London to Pori. Nestor was towed into Ostend on 2 September by Liverpool (United Kingdom).
Renown	United Kingdom	The ship ran aground in the River Colne.
Vrow Anna	Belgium	The ship was driven ashore and wrecked on Vlieland, Friesland, Netherlands with the loss of a crew member. She was on a voyage from Saint Petersburg, Russia to Antwerp.

== 31 August ==
List of shipwrecks: 31 August 1838
Ship	State	Description
Sydney	United Kingdom	The ship ran aground on the Middle Patch, in the Formby Channel. She was on a voyage from Liverpool, Lancashire to New Orleans, Louisiana, United States.
Tampico	(United States) Florida Territory	The ship ran aground on the Carysfort Reef. She was on a voyage from Havana, Cuba to Bordeaux, Gironde, France. Tampico was refloated and put into Key West.

== Unknown date ==
List of shipwrecks: Unknown date in August 1838
Ship	State	Description
Aberdeenshire	United Kingdom	The ship ran aground and was damaged at Soerabaja, Netherlands East Indies.
Ajax	United Kingdom	The ship was abandoned in the Atlantic Ocean. She was on a voyage from Philadelphia, Pennsylvania to Liverpool, Lancashire. Ajax was subsequently taken into Halifax, Nova Scotia, British North America, where she arrived on 4 August.
Atalanta	United Kingdom	The ship was abandoned in the Atlantic Ocean before 16 August. She was on a voyage from Miramichi, New Brunswick, British North America to Bideford, Devon.
Braganza	United States	Four of the brig's crew mutinied and murdered her captain and mate in late July. Three passengers and two crew members took to a boat; they were rescued on 12 August by Hebden (United Kingdom). Braganza was on a voyage from Philadelphia, Pennsylvania to Genoa, Kingdom of Sardinia. She was subsequently beached near Emden, Kingdom of Hanover. The mutineers were arrested.
Charlotte	United Kingdom	The ship was driven ashore between "Ponor" and "Cross Island", Russia. Her crew were rescued by Adam (United Kingdom). Charlotte was on a voyage from Arkhangelsk, Russia to Jersey, Channel Islands.
Elizabeth	(United Kingdom of Great Britain and Ireland) New South Wales	The schooner was driven ashore 70 nautical miles (130 km) east of the mouth of the Murray River. She was on a voyage from Port Adelaide, South Australia to Portland Bay
Fanny	(United Kingdom of Great Britain and Ireland) New South Wales	The schooner was driven ashore and wrecked between Cape Jaffa and Cape Northumberland, South Australia. All on board were rescued.
New Holland	United Kingdom	The ship was driven ashore near Cape Spartel, Morocco.She was on a voyage from London to Genoa, Kingdom of Sardinia and Livorno, Grand Duchy of Tuscany. New Holland was later refloated and put into Gibraltar for repairs.
Northumberland	United Kingdom	The ship capsized in a squall in St Andrews Bay. She was righted and towed into St Andrews, Fife for repairs.
Sarah	(United Kingdom of Great Britain and Ireland) New South Wales	The ship was wrecked at Long Beach.
Sir Henry Parnell	United Kingdom	The ship ran aground off Büyükdere, Ottoman Empire. She was later refloated and taken into Constantinople.
Sir Herbert Taylor	United Kingdom	The East Indiaman was wrecked in Silver Tree Reach, in the Hooghly River with the loss of a crew member. Survivors were rescued by the steamship Leesakond (United Kingdom).
Star	United Kingdom	The ship was driven ashore in the Humber. She was on a voyage from Arkhangelsk, Russia to Hull, Yorkshire.
Swiftsure	United Kingdom	The ship ran aground at Nagra Point, in the Dardanelles before 22 August. She was on a voyage from Constantinople, Ottoman Empire to Smyrna, Ottoman Empire. She was later refloated and put back to Constantinople.
Sylph	United Kingdom	The ship was driven ashore near "Wamochlim". She was on a voyage from Altona to Guernsey, Channel Islands.
Thistle	(United Kingdom of Great Britain and Ireland) New South Wales	The schooner was wrecked at Fourteen Mile Bluff. Her crew survived.
William	(United Kingdom of Great Britain and Ireland) New South Wales	The cutter was driven ashore and wrecked in Yankalilla Bay in late August.
