= Bahçeköy, Tavas =

Village in Turkey

Bahçeköy
- Neighbourhood
- Location in Turkey Bahçeköy (Turkey Aegean)
- Coordinates: 37.3592°N 29.1394°E
- Country: Turkey
- Province: Denizli
- District: Tavas
- Population (2022): 277
- Time zone: UTC+3 (TRT)

Bahçeköy is a neighbourhood in the municipality and district of Tavas, Denizli Province in Turkey. Its population is 277 (2022).
