= Dereağzı, Tavas =

Village in Turkey

Dereağzı
- Neighbourhood
- Location in Turkey Dereağzı (Turkey Aegean)
- Coordinates: 37°16′35″N 29°01′01″E
- Country: Turkey
- Province: Denizli
- District: Tavas
- Population (2022): 121
- Time zone: UTC+3 (TRT)

Dereağzı is a neighbourhood in the municipality and district of Tavas, Denizli Province in Turkey. Its population is 121 (2022).
