= Seki, Tavas =

Village in Turkey

Seki
- Neighbourhood
- Coordinates
- Country: Turkey
- Province: Denizli
- District: Tavas
- Population (2022): 309
- Time zone: UTC+3 (TRT)

Seki is a neighbourhood in the municipality and district of Tavas, Denizli Province in Turkey. Its population is 309 (2022).
