= Karahisar =

- Neighbourhood
- Location in Turkey Karahisar (Turkey Aegean)
- Coordinates: 37°37′N 28°57′E
- Country: Turkey
- Province: Denizli
- District: Tavas
- Elevation: 935 m (3,068 ft)
- Population (2022): 2,579
- Time zone: UTC+3 (TRT)
- Postal code: 20960
- Area code: 0258

Karahisar (formerly: Karaasar) is a neighbourhood of the municipality and district of Tavas, Denizli Province, Turkey. Its population is 2,579 (2022). Before the 2013 reorganisation, it was a town (belde).

It is situated along the Akçay creek, a tributary of Büyükmenderes River (historical Maeander). The distance to Tavas is 10 kilometres (6.2 mi). The settlement was founded in 1530s by nomadic Turkomans. The earlier name of the settlement Karaasar probably refers to Kara Fatma, the wife of the tribe. Gülfem one of the concubines of Suleyman I, the Ottoman sultan (also called the Magnificent) commissioned a mosque and a fountain in the settlement. In 1954 the settlement was declared a seat of township.
