= Hacıhamzalar, Koçarlı =

Coordinates: 37.71375°N 27.83402°E

Hacıhamzalar
- Neighbourhood
- Location in Turkey Hacıhamzalar (Turkey Aegean)
- Coordinates
- Country: Turkey
- Province: Aydın
- District: Koçarlı
- Population (2022): 154
- Time zone: UTC+3 (TRT)

Hacıhamzalar is a neighborhood in the municipality and district of Koçarlı, Aydın Province, Turkey. Its population is 154 (2022).
