= Bıyıklı, Koçarlı =

Bıyıklı
- Neighbourhood
- Location in Turkey Bıyıklı (Turkey Aegean)
- Coordinates: 37.7550°N 27.5878°E
- Country: Turkey
- Province: Aydın
- District: Koçarlı
- Population (2022): 1,111
- Time zone: UTC+3 (TRT)

Bıyıklı is a neighbourhood of the municipality and district of Koçarlı, Aydın Province, Turkey. Its population is 1,111 (2022). Before the 2013 reorganisation, it was a town (belde).
