= Altınova, Tavas =

Village in Turkey

Altınova
- Neighbourhood
- Location in Turkey Altınova (Turkey Aegean)
- Coordinates: 37.5248°N 28.9116°E
- Country: Turkey
- Province: Denizli
- District: Tavas
- Population (2022): 451
- Time zone: UTC+3 (TRT)

Altınova is a neighbourhood in the municipality and district of Tavas, Denizli Province in Turkey. Its population is 451 as of 2022.
