= Dedeköy, Koçarlı =

Dedeköy
- Neighbourhood
- Location in Turkey Dedeköy (Turkey Aegean)
- Coordinates: 37°45′44″N 27°39′44″E
- Country: Turkey
- Province: Aydın
- District: Koçarlı
- Population (2022): 530
- Time zone: UTC+3 (TRT)

Dedeköy is a neighbourhood in the municipality and district of Koçarlı, Aydın Province, Turkey. Its population is 530 (2022).
