= Yenimahalle, Koçarlı =

Village in Turkey

Yenimahalle
- Neighbourhood
- Location in Turkey Yenimahalle (Turkey Aegean)
- Coordinates: 37°45′38″N 27°42′15″E
- Country: Turkey
- Province: Aydın
- District: Koçarlı
- Population (2024): 2,550
- Time zone: UTC+3 (TRT)

Yenimahalle is a neighbourhood in the municipality and district of Koçarlı, Aydın Province, Turkey. Its population is 2,550 (2024).
