= Orta, Koçarlı =

Village in Turkey

Orta
- Neighbourhood
- Location in Turkey Orta (Turkey Aegean)
- Coordinates: 37°47′11″N 27°42′32″E
- Country: Turkey
- Province: Aydın
- District: Koçarlı
- Population (2024): 1,367
- Time zone: UTC+3 (TRT)

Orta is a neighbourhood in the municipality and district of Koçarlı, Aydın Province, Turkey. Its population is 1,367 (2024).
