= Damlacık, Tavas =

Village in Turkey

Damlacık
- Neighbourhood
- Location in Turkey Damlacık (Turkey Aegean)
- Coordinates: 37°17′14″N 28°59′36″E
- Country: Turkey
- Province: Denizli
- District: Tavas
- Population (2022): 60
- Time zone: UTC+3 (TRT)

Damlacık is a neighbourhood in the municipality and district of Tavas, Denizli Province in Turkey. Its population is 60 (2022).
