= Vakıf, Tavas =

Village in Turkey

Vakıf
- Neighbourhood
- Location in Turkey Vakıf (Turkey Aegean)
- Coordinates: 37°37′21″N 28°58′59″E
- Country: Turkey
- Province: Denizli
- District: Tavas
- Population (2022): 620
- Time zone: UTC+3 (TRT)

Vakıf is a neighbourhood in the municipality and district of Tavas, Denizli Province in Turkey. Its population is 620 (2022).
