= Mersinbeleni, Koçarlı =

Mersinbeleni
- Neighbourhood
- Location in Turkey Mersinbeleni (Turkey Aegean)
- Coordinates: 37°38′33″N 27°41′22″E
- Country: Turkey
- Province: Aydın
- District: Koçarlı
- Population (2022): 577
- Time zone: UTC+3 (TRT)

Mersinbeleni is a neighbourhood in the municipality and district of Koçarlı, Aydın Province, Turkey. Its population is 577 (2022).
