= Garipköy, Tavas =

Village in Turkey

Garipköy
- Neighbourhood
- Location in Turkey Garipköy (Turkey Aegean)
- Coordinates: 37°28′N 29°01′E
- Country: Turkey
- Province: Denizli
- District: Tavas
- Population (2022): 685
- Time zone: UTC+3 (TRT)

Garipköy is a neighbourhood of the municipality and district of Tavas, Denizli Province, Turkey. Its population is 685 (2022). Before the 2013 reorganisation, it was a town (belde).
