= Karadut, Koçarlı =

Karadut
- Neighbourhood
- Location in Turkey Karadut (Turkey Aegean)
- Coordinates: 37.7167°N 27.5833°E
- Country: Turkey
- Province: Aydın
- District: Koçarlı
- Population (2022): 61
- Time zone: UTC+3 (TRT)

Karadut is a neighbourhood in the municipality and district of Koçarlı, Aydın Province, Turkey. Its population is 61 (2022).
