= Cincin, Koçarlı =

Cincin
- Neighbourhood
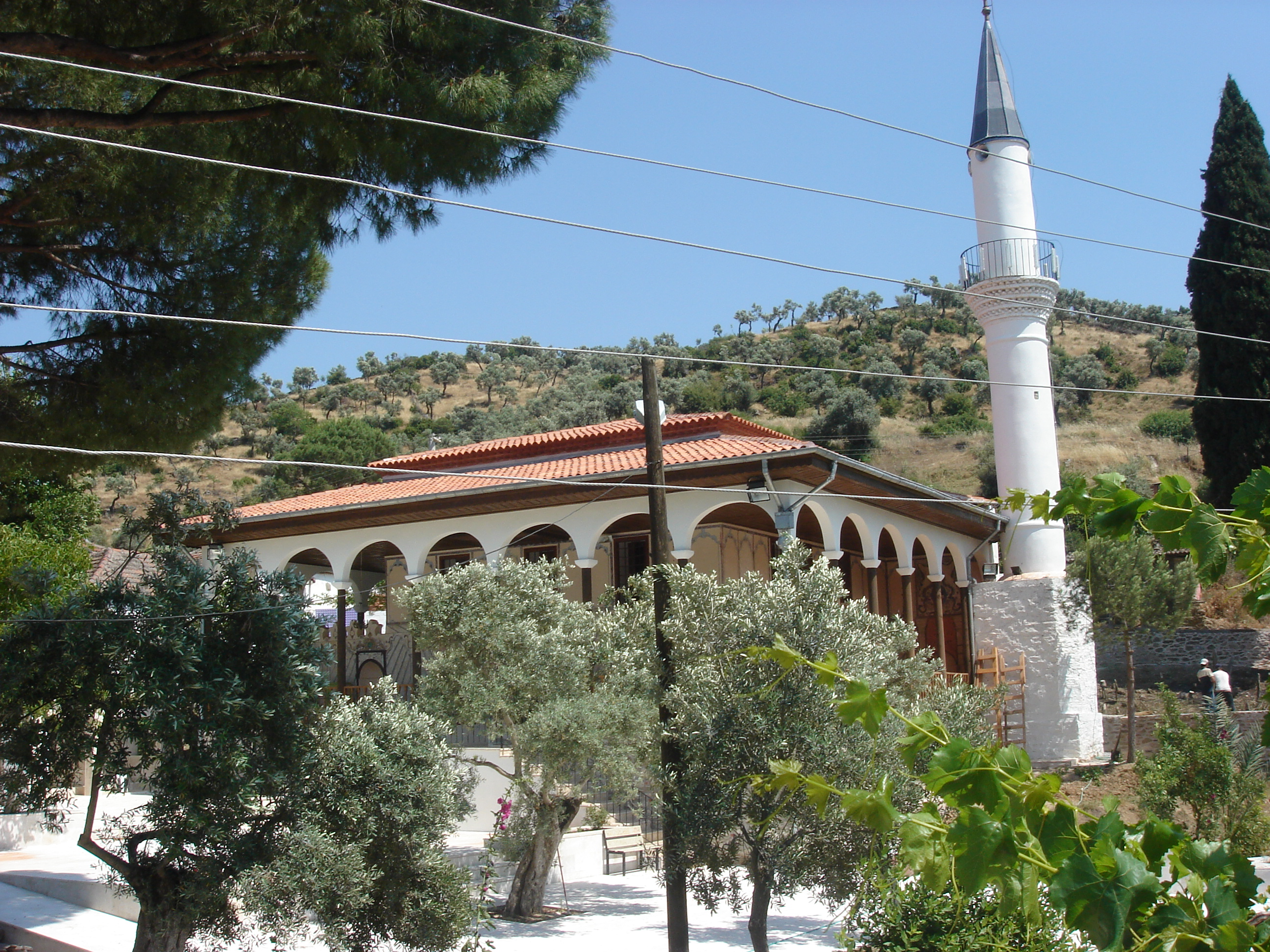

- Location within Turkey Location within Turkey Aegean
- Coordinates: 37°43′55″N 27°45′14″E
- Country: Turkey
- Province: Aydın
- District: Koçarlı
- Population (2022): 685
- Time zone: UTC+3 (TRT)

Cincin is a neighbourhood in the municipality and district of Koçarlı, Aydın Province, Turkey. Its population is 685 (2022).
