= Pınarlık, Tavas =

Village in Turkey

Pınarlık
- Neighbourhood
- Country: Turkey
- Province: Denizli
- District: Tavas
- Population (2022): 345
- Time zone: UTC+3 (TRT)

Pınarlık is a neighbourhood in the municipality and district of Tavas, Denizli Province in Turkey. As of the 2022 census, its population is 345.
