= Sofular, Tavas =

Village in Turkey

Sofular
- Neighbourhood
- Location in Turkey Sofular (Turkey Aegean)
- Coordinates: 37°34′0″N 28°52′29″E
- Country: Turkey
- Province: Denizli
- District: Tavas
- Population (2022): 405
- Time zone: UTC+3 (TRT)

Sofular is a neighbourhood in the municipality and district of Tavas, Denizli Province in Turkey. Its population is 405 (2022).
