= Tekeli (surname) =

Tekeli is a surname. Notable people with the surname include:

- Osman Nuri Tekeli (1893–?), Turkish bureaucrat
- Peter Tekeli (1720–1792), Russian general-in-chief of Serb origin
- Resul Tekeli (born 1986), Turkish volleyball player
- Sevim Tekeli (1924–2019), Turkish academic
- Şirin Tekeli (1944–2017), Turkish academic

== See also ==
- Tekeli Lala Mehmed Pasha (died 1595), Ottoman Grand vizier
- Tekeli (disambiguation)
