= Birci, Koçarlı =

Birci
- Neighbourhood
- Location in Turkey Birci (Turkey Aegean)
- Coordinates: 37°43′25″N 27°41′36″E
- Country: Turkey
- Province: Aydın
- District: Koçarlı
- Population (2022): 186
- Time zone: UTC+3 (TRT)

Birci is a neighbourhood in the municipality and district of Koçarlı, Aydın Province, Turkey. Its population is 186 (2022).
