= Pınarlar, Tavas =

Village in Turkey

Pınarlar
- Neighbourhood
- Location in Turkey Pınarlar (Turkey Aegean)
- Coordinates: 37°30′29″N 29°04′44″E
- Country: Turkey
- Province: Denizli
- District: Tavas
- Population (2022): 1,079
- Time zone: UTC+3 (TRT)

Pınarlar is a neighbourhood of the municipality and district of Tavas, Denizli Province, Turkey. Its population is 1,079 (2022). Before the 2013 reorganisation, it was a town (belde).
