= Çallı, Koçarlı =

Çallı
- Neighbourhood
- Country: Turkey
- Province: Aydın
- District: Koçarlı
- Population (2022): 546
- Time zone: UTC+3 (TRT)

Çallı is a neighbourhood in the municipality and district of Koçarlı, Aydın Province, Turkey. Its population is 546 (2022).
