= Kozlar, Tavas =

Village in Turkey

Kozlar
- Neighbourhood
- Location in Turkey Kozlar (Turkey Aegean)
- Coordinates: 37°15′N 29°01′E
- Country: Turkey
- Province: Denizli
- District: Tavas
- Population (2022): 582
- Time zone: UTC+3 (TRT)

Kozlar is a neighbourhood in the municipality and district of Tavas, Denizli Province in Turkey. Its population is 582 (2022).
