= Şahinciler, Koçarlı =

Şahinciler
- Neighbourhood
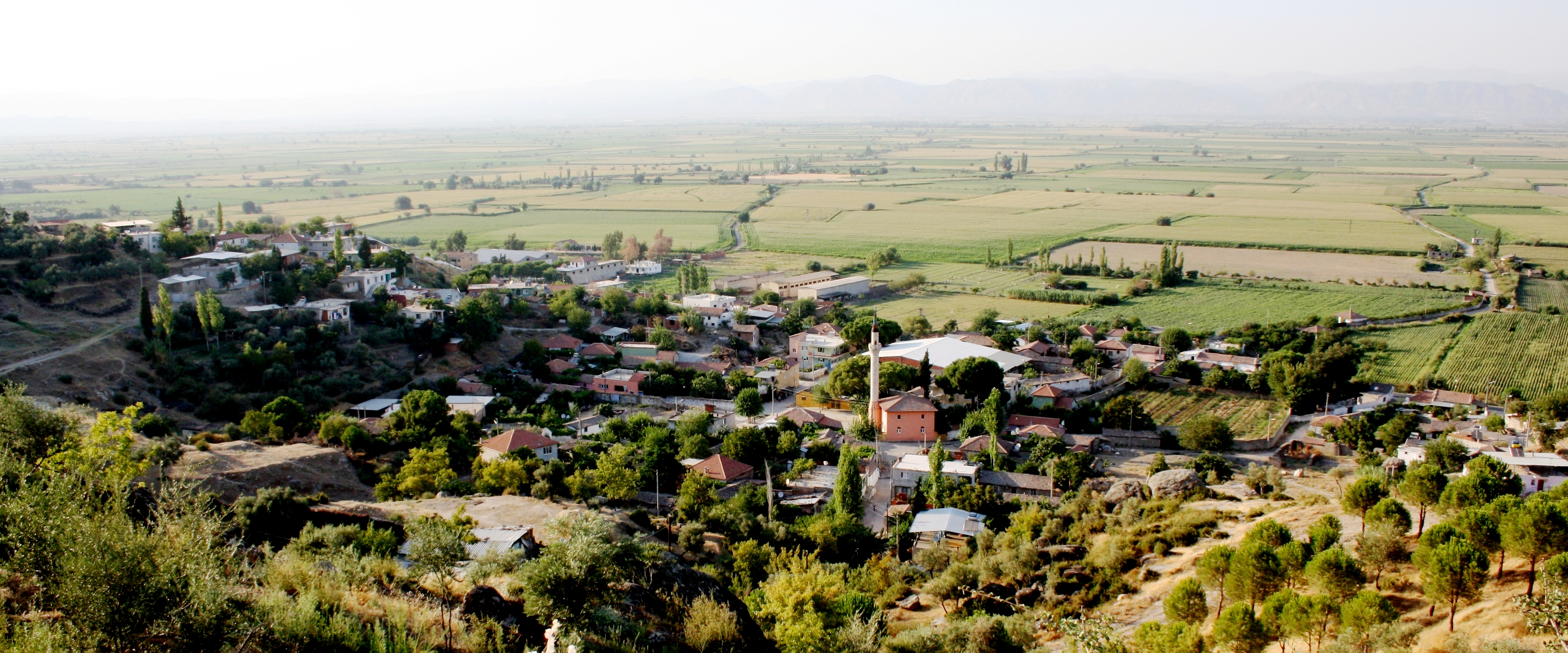

- Location within Turkey Location within Turkey Aegean
- Coordinates: 37°45′40″N 27°41′0″E
- Country: Turkey
- Province: Aydın
- District: Koçarlı
- Population (2022): 288
- Time zone: UTC+3 (TRT)

Şahinciler is a neighbourhood in the municipality and district of Koçarlı, Aydın Province, Turkey. Its population is 288 (2022).
