= Nikfer, Tavas =

Village in Turkey

Nikfer
- Neighbourhood
- Location in Turkey Nikfer (Turkey Aegean)
- Coordinates: 37°24′N 29°08′E
- Country: Turkey
- Province: Denizli
- District: Tavas
- Population (2022): 1,974
- Time zone: UTC+3 (TRT)

Nikfer is a neighbourhood of the municipality and district of Tavas, Denizli Province, Turkey. Its population is 1,974 (2022). Before the 2013 reorganisation, it was a town (belde).
