= Karaağaç, Koçarlı =

Karaağaç
- Neighbourhood
- Location in Turkey Karaağaç (Turkey Aegean)
- Coordinates: 37.6394°N 27.7506°E
- Country: Turkey
- Province: Aydın
- District: Koçarlı
- Population (2022): 133
- Time zone: UTC+3 (TRT)

Karaağaç is a neighbourhood in the municipality and district of Koçarlı, Aydın Province, Turkey. Its population is 133 (2022).
