= Atatürk, Koçarlı =

Village in Turkey

Atatürk
- Neighbourhood
- Location in Turkey Atatürk (Turkey Aegean)
- Coordinates: 37°45′27″N 27°42′45″E
- Country: Turkey
- Province: Aydın
- District: Koçarlı
- Population (2024): 325
- Time zone: UTC+3 (TRT)

Atatürk is a neighbourhood in the municipality and district of Koçarlı, Aydın Province, Turkey. Its population is 325 (2024).
