= Tavas =

- District and municipality
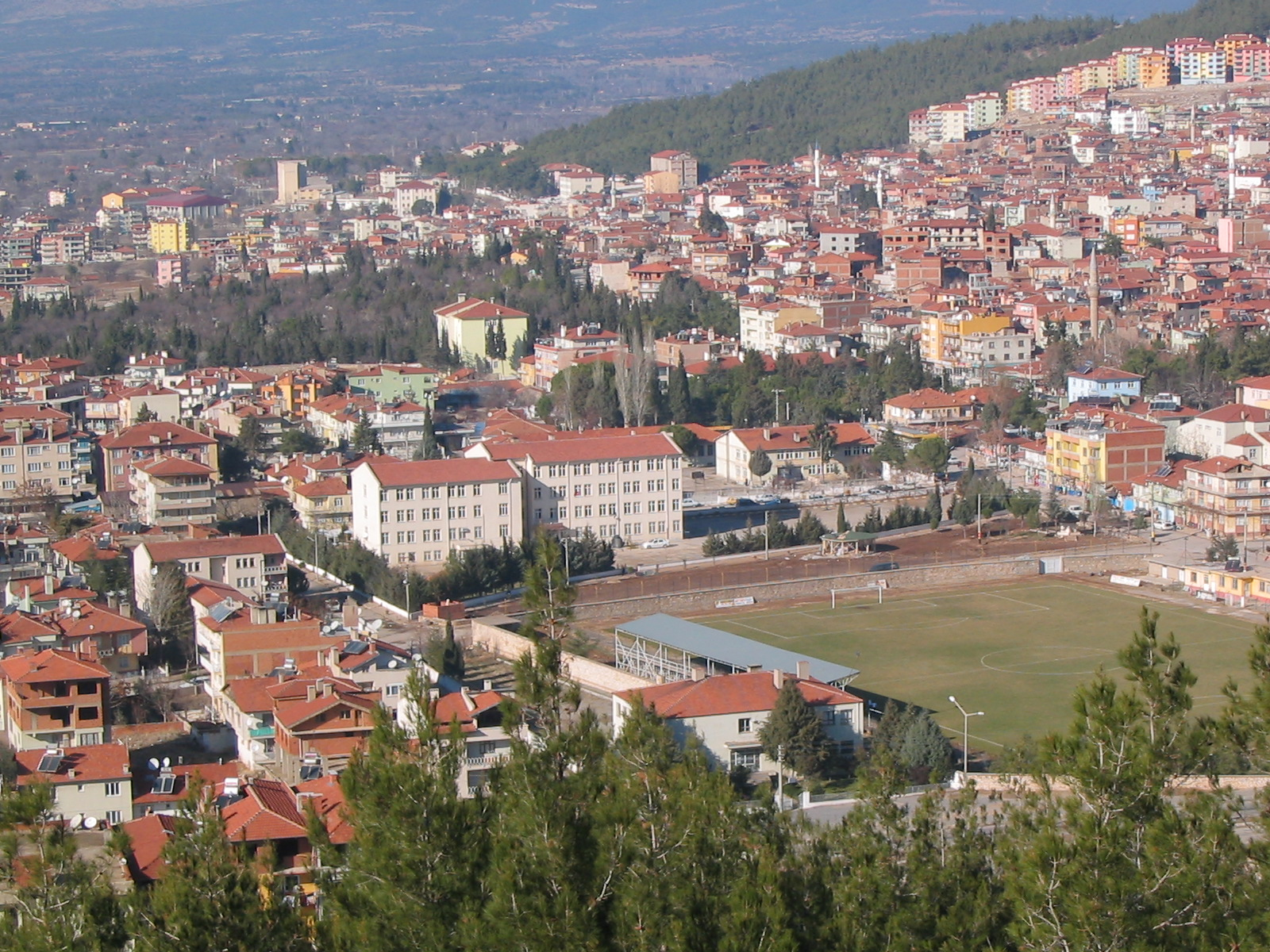

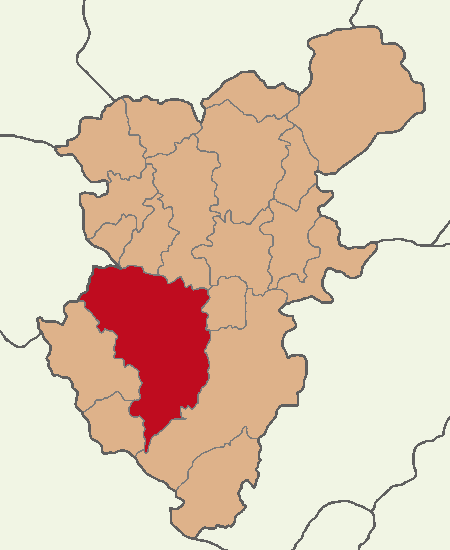
- Map showing Tavas District in Denizli Province

- Location within Turkey Location within Turkey Aegean
- Coordinates: 37°34′22″N 29°04′17″E
- Country: Turkey
- Province: Denizli

Government
  - Mayor: Kadir Tatık (CHP)
- Area: 1,432 km^{2} (553 sq mi)
- Elevation: 941 m (3,087 ft)
- Population (2024): 40,591
  - Density: 28.35/km^{2} (73.41/sq mi)
- Time zone: UTC+3 (TRT)
- Postal code: 20500
- Area code: 0258
- Website: www.tavas.bel.tr

Tavas is a municipality and district of Denizli Province, Turkey. Its area is 1,432 km^{2}, and its population is 41,712 (2022). It is on a wide plain on the road to Muğla, near to the district of Kale (and often the two are linked in one breath Kale-Tavas).

== History ==
The area has been occupied for a long time, proven by the presence of the mound of Medet Höyük, which appears to date back to the Bronze Age (but which has not been thoroughly excavated or researched). Many civilizations have settled here including the Hittites, Phrygians, Persians, Ancient Greeks, Romans, and Byzantines.

In antiquity this land south of the Menderes River was part of the region of Caria and was controlled from the nearby castle of Kale (known as Tabae in antiquity).

In the 18th century emigrants from Circassia settled in Garipköy and Sarıabat villages.

Tavas was reported as having a timber industry in 1920.

== Composition ==
There are 50 neighbourhoods in Tavas District:

- Akıncılar
- Akyar
- Alpa
- Altınova
- Avdan
- Aydoğdu
- Baharlar
- Bahçeköy
- Balkıca
- Çağırgan
- Çalıköy
- Çiftlikköy
- Damlacık
- Denizoluğu
- Dereağzı
- Derinkuyu
- Ebecik
- Garipköy
- Gökçeler
- Gümüşdere
- Güzelköy
- Hırka
- Horasanlı
- Karahisar
- Kayaca
- Kayapınar
- Keçeliler
- Kızılca
- Kızılcabölük
- Kozlar
- Medet
- Nikfer
- Orta
- Ovacık
- Pınarlar
- Pınarlık
- Samanlık
- Sarıabat
- Seki
- Sofular
- Solmaz
- Tekkeköy
- Ulukent
- Vakıf
- Yahşiler
- Yaka
- Yeni
- Yeşilköy
- Yorga
- Yukarıboğaz

== Tavas today ==
Like in Denizli, there are textile and clothing industries in the area, and the town also produces leblebi (dried chick peas). This is a rural area and many of the young generation have migrated to the Aegean coast or to larger cities in search of careers (they have a reputation for canny business nous). The remaining people are mainly aging and conservative, there are a great number of mosques on the skyline.

Tavas is a small town providing a bank and other essential facilities to the surrounding villages. There is little in the way of entertainment or social amenities (a few cafes and a couple of internet cafes), although the local pizza pide is much admired.

People commonly deal with agriculture. Tobacco and chickpeas are most planted products.

There is a well-known folk dance Tavas Zeybeği, which is always performed at wedding parties in the town.

Tavas is one of the leading places in grain cultivation in Turkey's agriculture.
