= Baharlar, Tavas =

Village in Turkey

Baharlar
- Neighbourhood
- Location in Turkey Baharlar (Turkey Aegean)
- Coordinates: 37.4506°N 28.9393°E
- Country: Turkey
- Province: Denizli
- District: Tavas
- Population (2022): 529
- Time zone: UTC+3 (TRT)

Baharlar is a neighbourhood of the municipality and district of Tavas, Denizli Province, Turkey. Its population is 529 (2022). Before the 2013 reorganisation, it was a town (belde).
