= Samanlık, Tavas =

Village in Turkey

Samanlık
- Neighbourhood
- Location in Turkey Samanlık (Turkey Aegean)
- Coordinates: 37°34′13″N 29°04′29″E
- Country: Turkey
- Province: Denizli
- District: Tavas
- Population (2022): 4,547
- Time zone: UTC+3 (TRT)

Samanlık is a neighbourhood in the municipality and district of Tavas, Denizli Province in Turkey. Its population is 4,547 (2022).
