= Yağcıdere, Koçarlı =

Yağcıdere
- Neighbourhood
- Location in Turkey Yağcıdere (Turkey Aegean)
- Coordinates: 37°37′N 27°44′E
- Country: Turkey
- Province: Aydın
- District: Koçarlı
- Population (2022): 147
- Time zone: UTC+3 (TRT)

Yağcıdere is a neighbourhood in the municipality and district of Koçarlı, Aydın Province, Turkey. Its population is 147 (2022).
