= Aydoğdu, Tavas =

Village in Turkey

Aydoğdu
- Neighbourhood
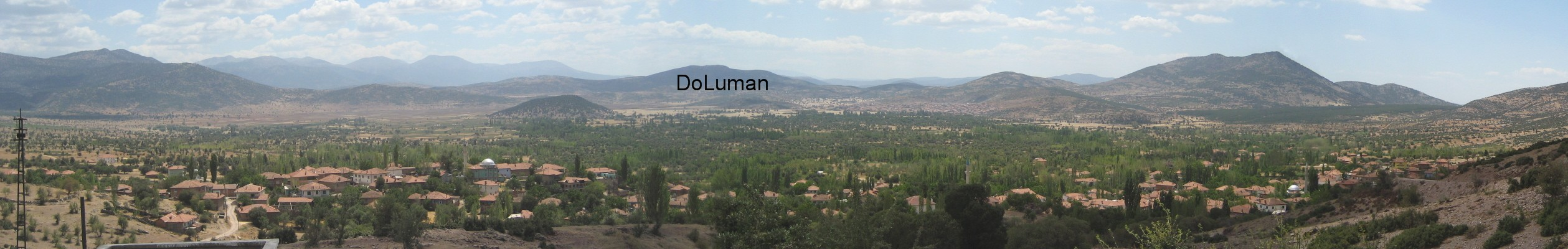

- Location within Turkey Location within Turkey Aegean
- Coordinates: 37°30′45″N 29°10′03″E
- Country: Turkey
- Province: Denizli
- District: Tavas
- Population (2022): 512
- Time zone: UTC+3 (TRT)

Aydoğdu is a neighbourhood in the municipality and district of Tavas, Denizli Province in Turkey. Its population is 512 (2022). Aydoğdu is located about 62 km south of the provincial capital, Denizli and 18 km southeast of Tavas. Legend has it that the name of the village was originally Abaz, named after its founder, Abass, whose tomb was demolished but later rebuilt. Abass and other ghazi fighters were active during the Seljuk Sultanate of Rum era. The village generally experiences dry summers and cold, snowy winters.
