= Boğaziçi, Koçarlı =

Boğaziçi
- Neighbourhood
- Location in Turkey Boğaziçi (Turkey Aegean)
- Coordinates: 37.7325°N 27.8372°E
- Country: Turkey
- Province: Aydın
- District: Koçarlı
- Population (2022): 192
- Time zone: UTC+3 (TRT)

Boğaziçi is a neighbourhood in the municipality and district of Koçarlı, Aydın Province, Turkey. Its population is 192 (2022).
