= Orhaniye, Koçarlı =

Orhaniye
- Neighbourhood
- Country: Turkey
- Province: Aydın
- District: Koçarlı
- Population (2022): 139
- Time zone: UTC+3 (TRT)

Orhaniye is a neighbourhood in the municipality and district of Koçarlı, Aydın Province, Turkey. Its population is 139 (2022). The neighborhood is 14.6 kilometers from the city center of Aydın, and is 17.5 kilometers away from the district center of Koçarlı.
