= Horasanlı, Tavas =

Village in Turkey

Horasanlı
- Neighbourhood
- Location in Turkey Horasanlı (Turkey Aegean)
- Coordinates: 37°25′N 29°04′E
- Country: Turkey
- Province: Denizli
- District: Tavas
- Population (2022): 519
- Time zone: UTC+3 (TRT)

Horasanlı is a neighbourhood in the municipality and district of Tavas, Denizli Province in Turkey. Its population is 519 (2022).
