= Apollonia Salbaces =

Town in ancient Caria, Anatolia

Coordinates: 37°30′23″N 29°01′23″E

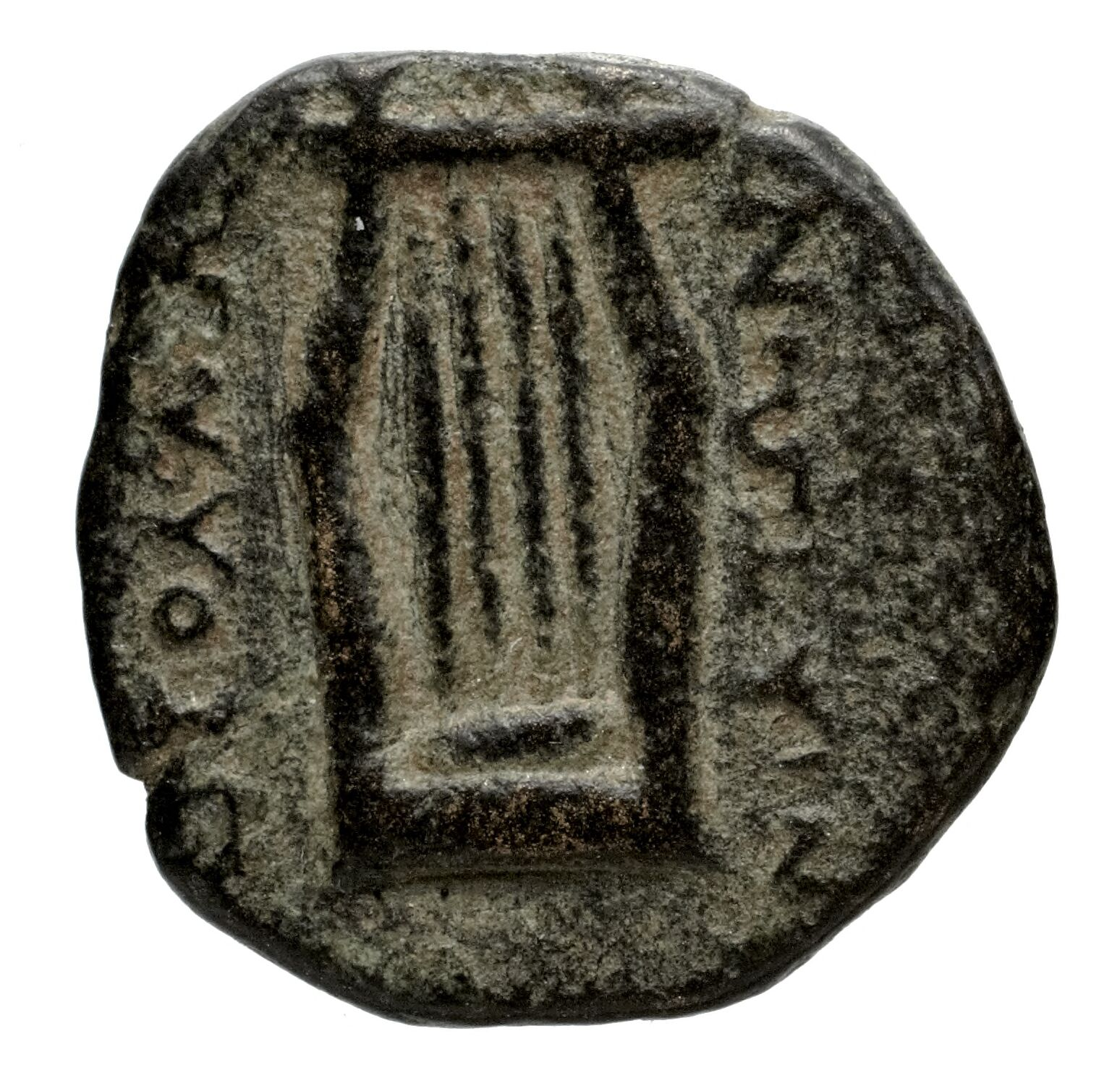
coin from Apollonia Salbaces

Apollonia Salbaces or Apollonia Salbakes (Ancient Greek: Ἀπολλωνία Σαλβάκη) was a town in ancient Caria, Anatolia.

It became the seat of a bishop, and under the name Apollonia Salbace it remains a titular see of the Roman Catholic Church.

The site of Apollonia Salbaces is near the modern village Medet in the Tavas district of Denizli province in Turkey.
