= Ebecik, Tavas =

Village in Turkey

Ebecik
- Neighbourhood
- Location in Turkey Ebecik (Turkey Aegean)
- Coordinates: 37°32′N 28°52′E
- Country: Turkey
- Province: Denizli
- District: Tavas
- Population (2022): 477
- Time zone: UTC+3 (TRT)

Ebecik is a neighbourhood in the municipality and district of Tavas, Denizli Province in Turkey. Its population is 477 (2022).
