= Balkıca, Tavas =

Village in Turkey

Balkıca
- Neighbourhood
- Location in Turkey Balkıca (Turkey Aegean)
- Coordinates: 37.3246°N 29.1013°E
- Country: Turkey
- Province: Denizli
- District: Tavas
- Population (2022): 689
- Time zone: UTC+3 (TRT)

Balkıca is a neighbourhood in the municipality and district of Tavas, Denizli Province in Turkey. Its population is 689 (2022).
