= Sobuca, Koçarlı =

Sobuca
- Neighbourhood
- Location in Turkey Sobuca (Turkey Aegean)
- Coordinates: 37°45′45″N 27°40′40″E
- Country: Turkey
- Province: Aydın
- District: Koçarlı
- Population (2022): 364
- Time zone: UTC+3 (TRT)

Sobuca is a neighbourhood in the municipality and district of Koçarlı, Aydın Province, Turkey. Its population is 364 (2022).
