= Maurice Holleaux =

French historian, archaeologist and epigrapher (1861–1932)

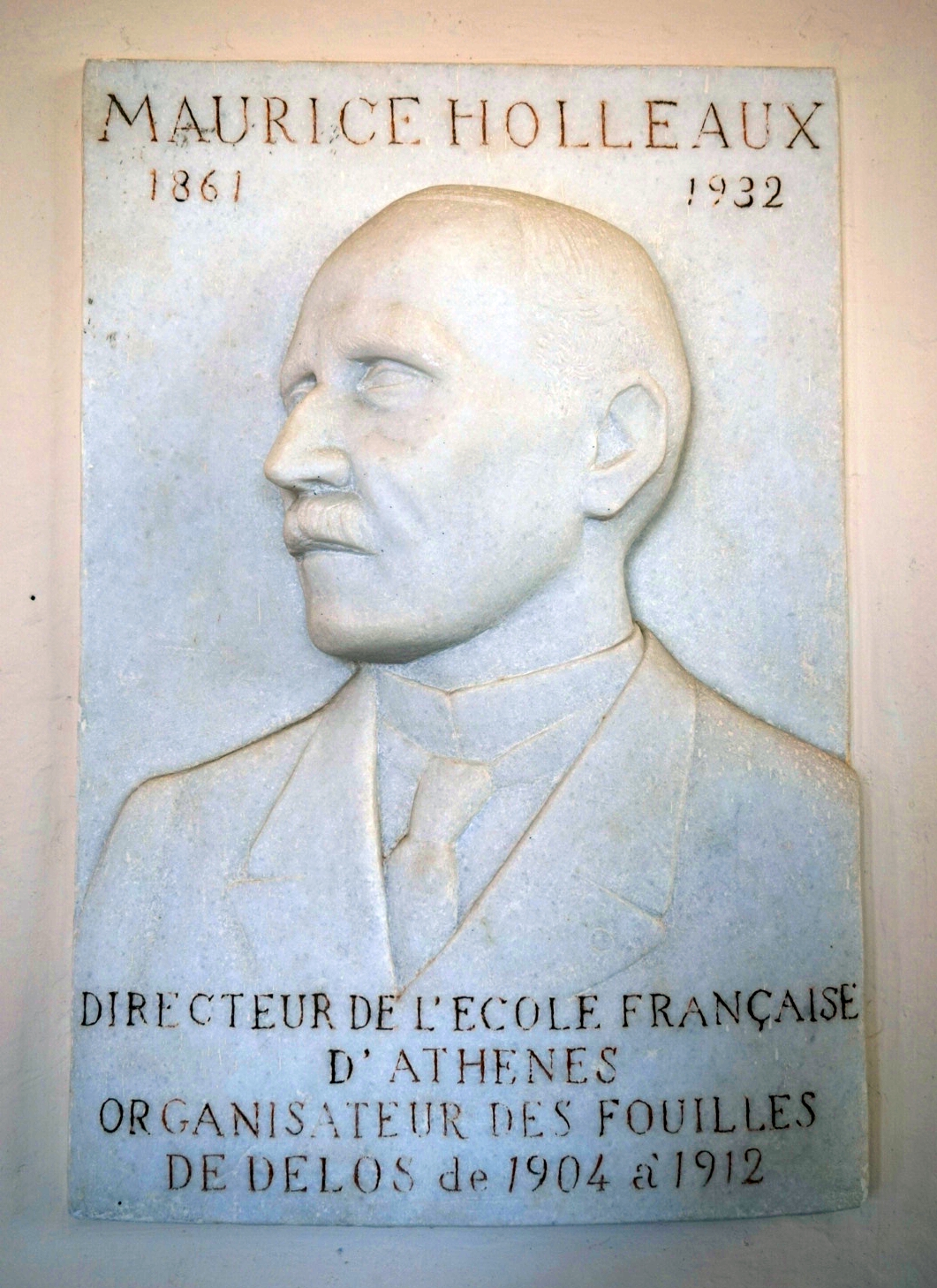
- Born: 15 April 1861; Château-Thierry, France
- Died: 21 September 1932 (aged 71); La Ferté-sous-Jouarre, France
- Occupations: Historian; Archaeologist; Epigrapher

Maurice Holleaux (15 April 1861 – 21 September 1932) was a 19th–20th-century French historian, archaeologist and epigrapher, a specialist of Ancient Greece.

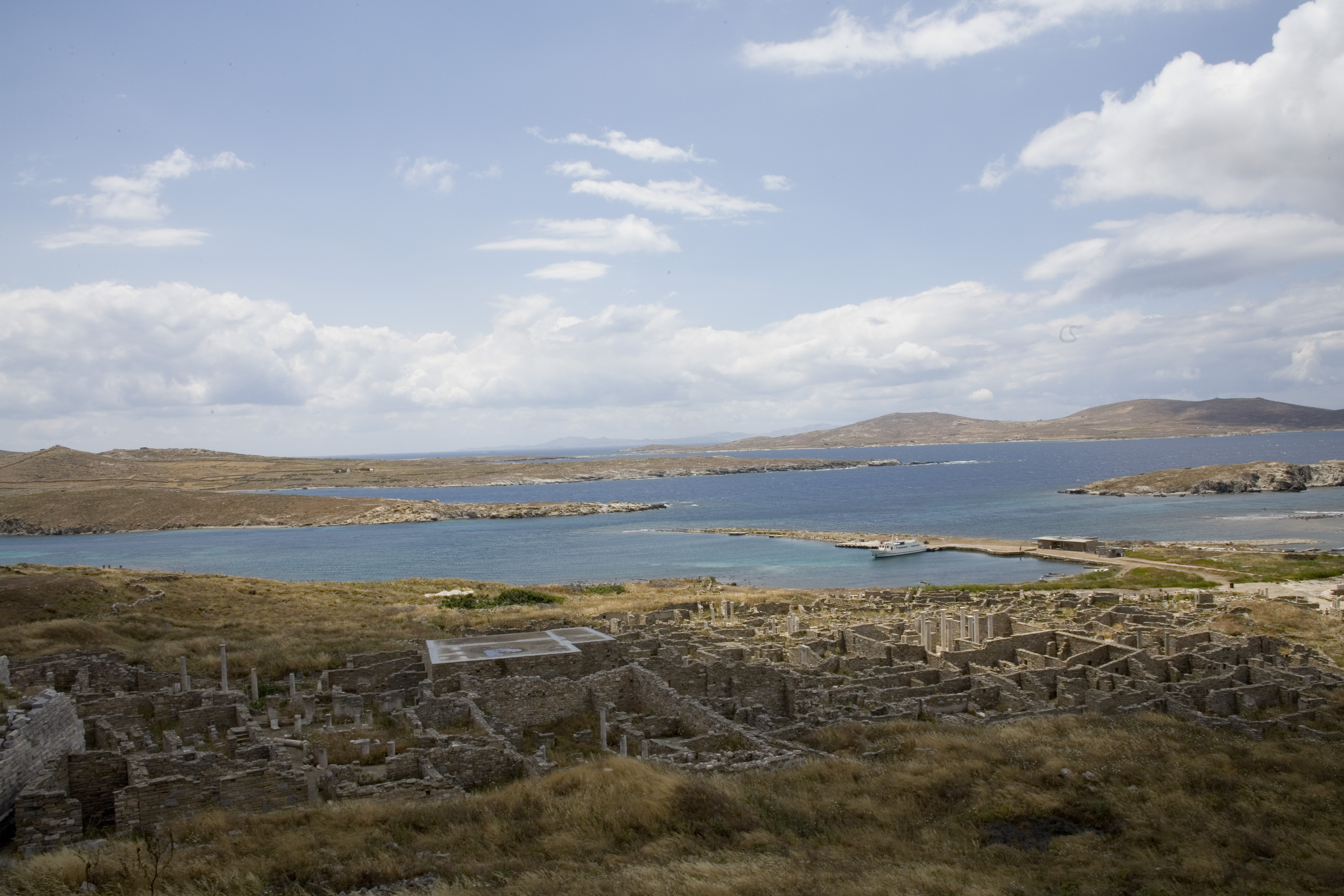
Site of Delos whose archaeological exploration was strongly driven by Maurice Holleaux during his leadership of the French School at Athens

== Biography ==
=== Années de formation ===
Admitted in the École normale supérieure in 1879, Holleaux was agrégé in history in 1881 and became a member of the French School at Athens in 1882. He then conducted epigraphic explorations in Samos and Rhodes. He devoted thereafter an important scientific activity in the latter city. In 1884 he undertook missions in Asia Minor during which he discovered with Pierre Paris the inscription of Diogenes of Oenoanda. Back in Greece, he excavated in Boeotia the Ptoion sanctuary which had been previously identified by the traveler William Leake. Between 1884 and 1891 he directed the excavation of this shrine to Apollo Ptoios in Boeotia. In 1888 he discovered an inscription bearing the text of the speech Nero spoke in Corinth in 67 to restitute their freedom to the Greeks.

=== Career ===
He was appointed in the University of Lyon in 1888. He then became a friend of Philippe Fabia. His research abandoned the archaeological area to focus more exclusively on epigraphy.

Leaving Lyon after sixteen years of teaching, he directed the French School at Athens from 1904 to 1912. Succeeding Théophile Homolle, he led archaeological activities of the school and then oversaw the archaeological exploration of Delos.

On his return to France, he was a lecturer at the Faculty of Paris. In 1918 he published a memoir which then became his complementary thesis:Étude sur la traduction en grec du titre consulaire. In 1923, he defended his main thesis, completed at the end of 1920: Rome, la Grèce et les monarchies hellénistiques au IIIe s. BC, 273-205 during a session remained memorable where he himself was critical of his own work. The work yet deeply renewed the perspective on the attitude of Rome to the Greeks. Holleaux was then appointed professor of Hellenistic antiquity to a Chair at the Sorbonne.

In 1928 he became a member of the Académie des inscriptions et belles-lettres. In 1927, he succeeded Paul Foucart to the chair of Greek epigraphy of the College de France.

Maurice Holleaux was the master of historian Louis Robert who gathered and published posthumously his articles. One of his sons was the magistrate and lawyer Georges Holleaux (1893-1973).

== Works ==
=== Books ===
- Strategos hupatos : Étude sur la traduction en grec du titre consulaire, Paris, 1918.
- Rome, la Grèce et les monarchies hellénistiques au IIIe siècle avant J. C. (273-205), de Boccard, Paris, 1921.
- Études d'épigraphie et d'histoire grecque, t. I-II, textes rassemblés par Louis Robert, Paris, 1938.
- Études d'épigraphie et d'histoire grecque, t. III, textes rassemblés par Louis Robert, Paris, 1942.
- Études d'épigraphie et d'histoire grecque, t. IV, textes rassemblés par Louis Robert, Paris, 1952.
- Études d'épigraphie et d'histoire grecque, t. V, textes rassemblés par Louis Robert, Paris, 1957.

=== Articles (selection) ===
- « The Romans in Illyria », Cambridge ancient History, VII, 1928.
- « Rome and Macedon », Cambridge ancient History, VIII, 1930.
- « The Romans against Philip », Cambridge ancient History, VIII, 1930.
- « Rome and Antiochos », Cambridge ancient History, VIII, 1930.

== Bibliography ==
- Étienne Michon, "Éloge funèbre de M. Maurice Holleaux, membre de l'Académie", Comptes rendus de l'Académie des inscriptions et belles-lettres, 76-3, 1932, (p. 329–337)Read online
- Mario Roques, « Notice sur la vie et les travaux de M. Maurice Holleaux », membre de l'Académie, CRAI, 87-1, 1943, (p. 14–73) Read online
- Werner Hartkopf: Die Akademie der Wissenschaften der DDR. Ein Beitrag zu ihrer Geschichte. Biografischer Index, Akademie, Berlin 1983, (p. 200)
- Christa Kirsten (Hrsg.): Die Altertumswissenschaften an der Berliner Akademie. Wahlvorschläge zur Aufnahme von Mitgliedern von F.A. Wolf bis zu G. Rodenwaldt. Akademie-Verlag, Berlin 1985 (Studien zur Geschichte der Akademie der Wissenschaften der DDR, Band 5), (p. 140–141).
