= Orta, Tavas =

Village in Turkey

Orta
- Neighbourhood
- Location in Turkey Orta (Turkey Aegean)
- Coordinates: 37°34′12″N 29°04′05″E
- Country: Turkey
- Province: Denizli
- District: Tavas
- Population (2022): 3,299
- Time zone: UTC+3 (TRT)

Orta is a neighbourhood in the municipality and district of Tavas, Denizli Province in Turkey. Its population is 3,299 (2022).
