= Yahşiler, Tavas =

Village in Turkey

Yahşiler
- Neighbourhood
- Location in Turkey Yahşiler (Turkey Aegean)
- Coordinates: 37.6560°N 28.8728°E
- Country: Turkey
- Province: Denizli
- District: Tavas
- Population (2022): 1,070
- Time zone: UTC+3 (TRT)

Yahşiler is a neighbourhood in the municipality and district of Tavas, Denizli Province in Turkey. Its population is 1,070 (2022).
