= Zeytinköy, Koçarlı =

Zeytinköy
- Neighbourhood
- Location in Turkey Zeytinköy (Turkey Aegean)
- Coordinates: 37°42′54″N 27°46′23″E
- Country: Turkey
- Province: Aydın
- District: Koçarlı
- Population (2022): 107
- Time zone: UTC+3 (TRT)

Zeytinköy is a neighbourhood in the municipality and district of Koçarlı, Aydın Province, Turkey. Its population is 107 (2022).
