= Karacaören, Koçarlı =

Karacaören
- Neighbourhood
- Location in Turkey Karacaören (Turkey Aegean)
- Coordinates: 37.6833°N 27.7833°E
- Country: Turkey
- Province: Aydın
- District: Koçarlı
- Population (2022): 150
- Time zone: UTC+3 (TRT)

Karacaören is a neighbourhood in the municipality and district of Koçarlı, Aydın Province, Turkey. Its population is 150 (2022).
