= Haydarlı, Koçarlı =

Haydarlı
- Neighbourhood
- Location in Turkey Haydarlı (Turkey Aegean)
- Coordinates: 37°44′2″N 27°34′5″E
- Country: Turkey
- Province: Aydın
- District: Koçarlı
- Population (2022): 586
- Time zone: UTC+3 (TRT)

Haydarlı is a neighbourhood in the municipality and district of Koçarlı, Aydın Province, Turkey. Its population is 586 (2022).
