= Tığıllar, Koçarlı =

Tığıllar
- Neighbourhood
- Location in Turkey Tığıllar (Turkey Aegean)
- Coordinates: 37°43′N 27°44′E
- Country: Turkey
- Province: Aydın
- District: Koçarlı
- Population (2022): 51
- Time zone: UTC+3 (TRT)

Tığıllar is a neighbourhood in the municipality and district of Koçarlı, Aydın Province, Turkey. Its population is 51 (2022).
