= Denizoluğu, Tavas =

Village in Turkey

Denizoluğu
- Neighbourhood
- Location in Turkey Denizoluğu (Turkey Aegean)
- Coordinates: 37°36′N 28°48′E
- Country: Turkey
- Province: Denizli
- District: Tavas
- Population (2022): 122
- Time zone: UTC+3 (TRT)

Denizoluğu is a neighbourhood in the municipality and district of Tavas, Denizli Province in Turkey. Its population is 122 (2022).
