= Sarıabat, Tavas =

Village in Turkey

Sarıabat
- Neighbourhood
- Location in Turkey Sarıabat (Turkey Aegean)
- Coordinates: 37.6111°N 29.1915°E
- Country: Turkey
- Province: Denizli
- District: Tavas
- Population (2022): 1,338
- Time zone: UTC+3 (TRT)

Sarıabat (also: Sarabat) is a neighbourhood in the municipality and district of Tavas, Denizli Province in Turkey. Its population is 1,338 (2022).
