= Halilbeyli, Koçarlı =

Halilbeyli
- Neighbourhood
- Country: Turkey
- Province: Aydın
- District: Koçarlı
- Population (2022): 283
- Time zone: UTC+3 (TRT)

Halilbeyli is a neighbourhood in the municipality and district of Koçarlı, Aydın Province, Turkey. Its population is 283 (2022).
