= Avdan, Tavas =

Village in Turkey

Avdan
- Neighbourhood
- Location in Turkey Avdan (Turkey Aegean)
- Coordinates: 37.5796°N 28.7931°E
- Country: Turkey
- Province: Denizli
- District: Tavas
- Population (2022): 612
- Time zone: UTC+3 (TRT)

Avdan is a neighbourhood in the municipality and district of Tavas, Denizli Province in Turkey. Its population is 612 (2022).
