= Kızılkaya, Koçarlı =

Kızılkaya
- Neighbourhood
- Location in Turkey Kızılkaya (Turkey Aegean)
- Coordinates: 37.7000°N 27.6167°E
- Country: Turkey
- Province: Aydın
- District: Koçarlı
- Population (2022): 291
- Time zone: UTC+3 (TRT)

Kızılkaya is a neighbourhood in the municipality and district of Koçarlı, Aydın Province, Turkey. Its population is 291 (2022).
