= Yağhanlı, Koçarlı =

Yağhanlı
- Neighbourhood
- Location in Turkey Yağhanlı (Turkey Aegean)
- Coordinates: 37°44′38″N 27°34′19″E
- Country: Turkey
- Province: Aydın
- District: Koçarlı
- Population (2022): 146
- Time zone: UTC+3 (TRT)

Yağhanlı is a neighbourhood in the municipality and district of Koçarlı, Aydın Province, Turkey. Its population is 146 (2022).
