= Timinciler, Koçarlı =

Timinciler
- Neighbourhood
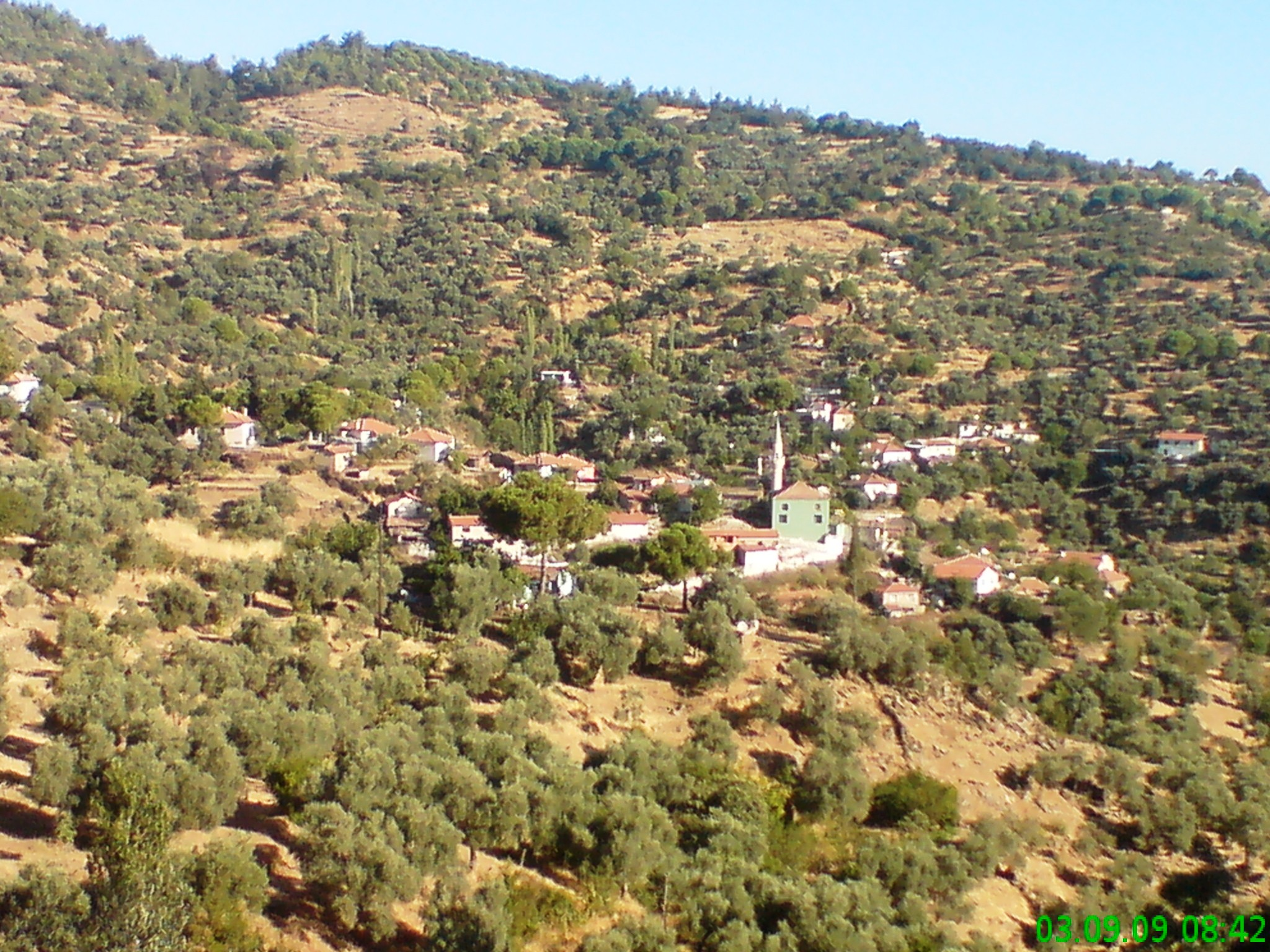

- Location within Turkey Location within Turkey Aegean
- Country: Turkey
- Province: Aydın
- District: Koçarlı
- Population (2022): 135
- Time zone: UTC+3 (TRT)

Timinciler is a neighbourhood in the municipality and district of Koçarlı, Aydın Province, Turkey. Its population is 135 (2022).
