= Adnan Menderes, Koçarlı =

Village in Turkey

Adnan Menderes
- Neighbourhood
- Location in Turkey Adnan Menderes (Turkey Aegean)
- Coordinates: 37°46′04″N 27°43′54″E
- Country: Turkey
- Province: Aydın
- District: Koçarlı
- Population (2024): 1,415
- Time zone: UTC+3 (TRT)

Adnan Menderes is a neighbourhood in the municipality and district of Koçarlı, Aydın Province, Turkey. Its population is 1,415 (2024).
