= Yaka, Tavas =

Village in Turkey

Yaka
- Neighbourhood
- Location in Turkey Yaka (Turkey Aegean)
- Coordinates: 37°34′41″N 29°03′36″E
- Country: Turkey
- Province: Denizli
- District: Tavas
- Population (2022): 3,611
- Time zone: UTC+3 (TRT)

Yaka is a neighbourhood in the Tavas district of Denizli Province, Turkey. Its population was 3,611 in 2022.
