= Evsekler, Koçarlı =

Evsekler
- Neighbourhood
- Location in Turkey Evsekler (Turkey Aegean)
- Coordinates: 37°43′N 27°47′E
- Country: Turkey
- Province: Aydın
- District: Koçarlı
- Population (2022): 108
- Time zone: UTC+3 (TRT)

Evsekler is a neighbourhood in the municipality and district of Koçarlı, Aydın Province, Turkey. Its population is 108 (2022).
