= Medet, Tavas =

Village in Denizli Province, Turkey

Medet
- Neighbourhood
- Location in Turkey Medet (Turkey Aegean)
- Coordinates: 37°30′N 29°01′E
- Country: Turkey
- Province: Denizli
- District: Tavas
- Population (2025): 279
- Time zone: UTC+3 (TRT)

Medet is a neighborhood in the municipality and district of Tavas, Denizli Province in Turkey. Its population is 279 (2025). It is located 7 kilometers west of Tavas on the Tavas Plain, near the site of the Medet Mound and the ancient city of Apollonia Salbace. The entire village is a first-degree protected archeological site.

== Name ==
The word medet in Turkish means literally "help."

== History ==
The locality has been inhabited since the Bronze Age. During the time of Hadrian, a temple of Apollo was built (surviving to this day). The settlement issued its own coins between the 1st century BCE and the 1st century CE.

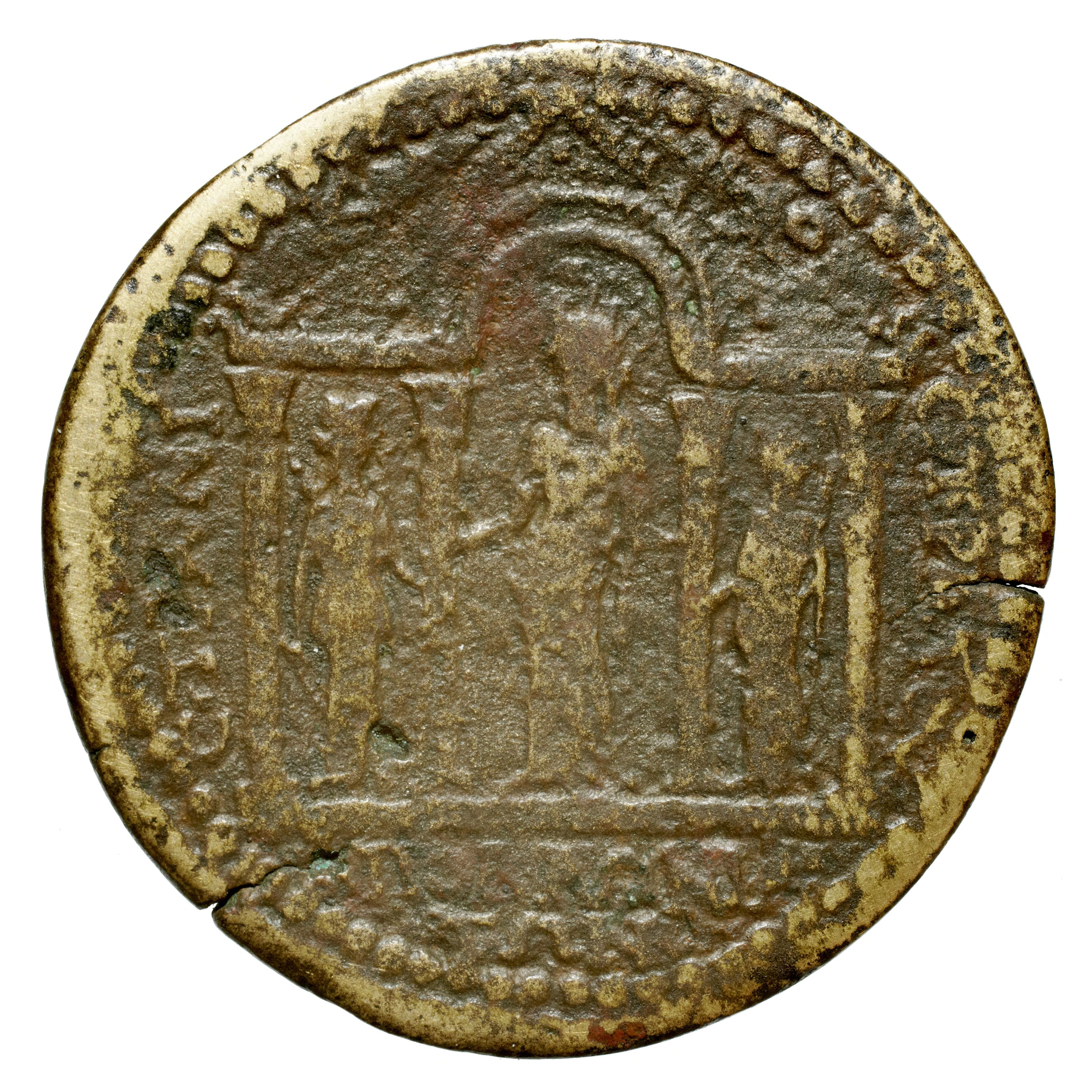
coin from Apollonia Salbace, era of Septimius Severus
