= Keçeliler, Tavas =

Village in Turkey

Keçeliler
- Neighbourhood
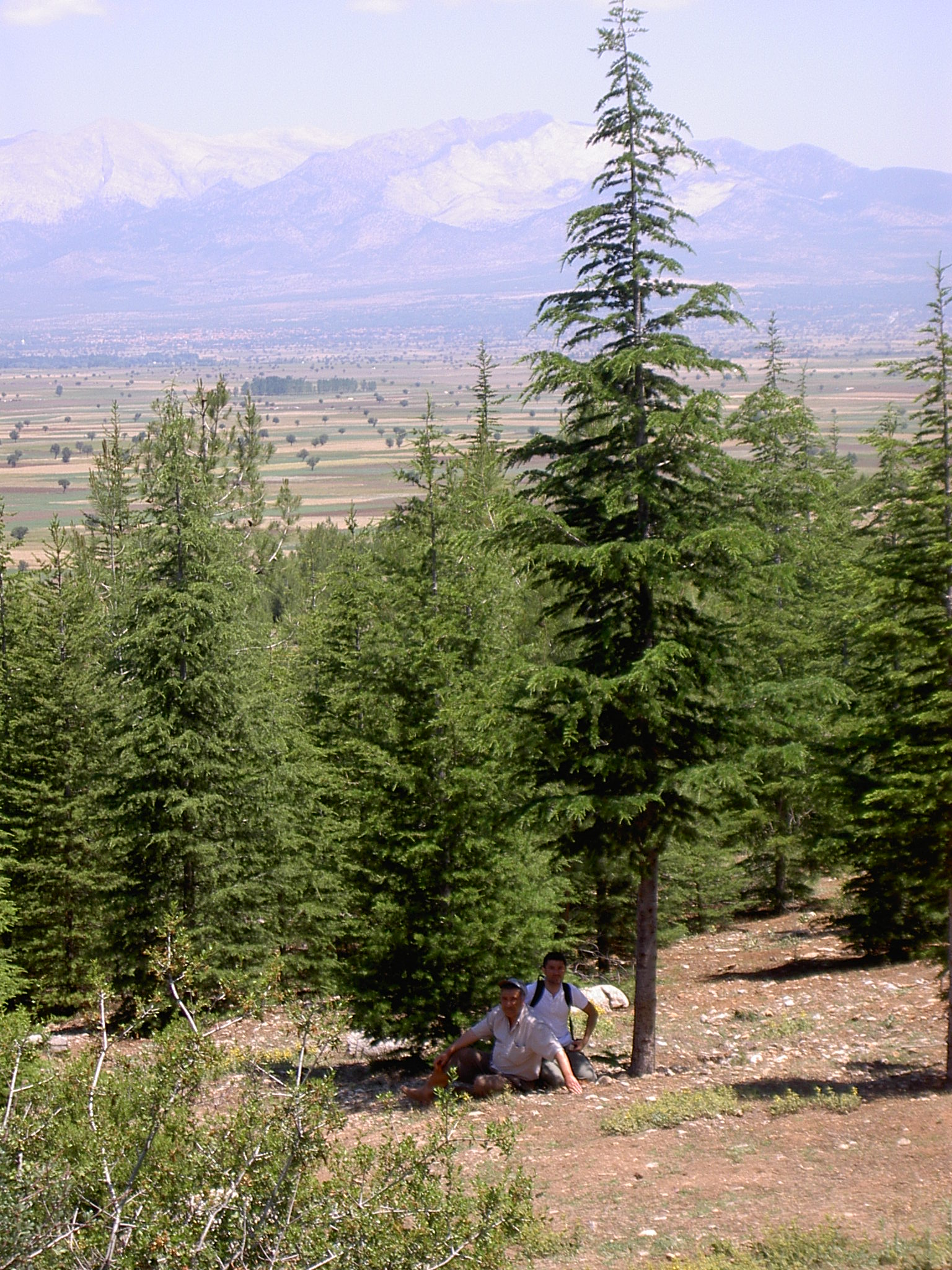

- Location within Turkey Location within Turkey Aegean
- Country: Turkey
- Province: Denizli
- District: Tavas
- Population (2022): 380
- Time zone: UTC+3 (TRT)

Keçeliler is a neighbourhood in the municipality and district of Tavas, Denizli Province in Turkey. Its population is 380 (2022).
