= Kızılca, Tavas =

Village in Turkey

Kızılca
- Neighbourhood
- Location in Turkey Kızılca (Turkey Aegean)
- Coordinates: 37°29′08″N 29°08′18″E
- Country: Turkey
- Province: Denizli
- District: Tavas
- Population (2022): 1,567
- Time zone: UTC+3 (TRT)

Kızılca is a neighbourhood of the municipality and district of Tavas, Denizli Province, Turkey. Its population is 1,567 (2022). Before the 2013 reorganisation, it was a town (belde).
