= Boydere, Koçarlı =

Boydere
- Neighbourhood
- Location in Turkey Boydere (Turkey Aegean)
- Coordinates: 37.7304°N 27.7868°E
- Country: Turkey
- Province: Aydın
- District: Koçarlı
- Population (2022): 166
- Time zone: UTC+3 (TRT)

Boydere is a neighbourhood in the municipality and district of Koçarlı, Aydın Province, Turkey. Its population is 166 (2022).
