= Yorga, Tavas =

Village in Turkey

Yorga
- Neighbourhood
- Location in Turkey Yorga (Turkey Aegean)
- Coordinates: 37°21′N 29°07′E
- Country: Turkey
- Province: Denizli
- District: Tavas
- Population (2022): 731
- Time zone: UTC+3 (TRT)

Yorga is a neighbourhood in the municipality and district of Tavas, Denizli Province in Turkey. Its population is 731 (2022).
