= Kasaplar, Koçarlı =

Kasaplar
- Neighbourhood
- Location in Turkey Kasaplar (Turkey Aegean)
- Coordinates: 37.7500°N 27.5833°E
- Country: Turkey
- Province: Aydın
- District: Koçarlı
- Population (2022): 445
- Time zone: UTC+3 (TRT)

Kasaplar is a neighbourhood in the municipality and district of Koçarlı, Aydın Province, Turkey. Its population is 445 (2022).
