= Akyar, Tavas =

Village in Turkey

Akyar
- Neighbourhood
- Location in Turkey Akyar (Turkey Aegean)
- Coordinates: 37.6105°N 29.1334°E
- Country: Turkey
- Province: Denizli
- District: Tavas
- Population (2022): 249
- Time zone: UTC+3 (TRT)

Akyar is a neighbourhood in the municipality and district of Tavas, Denizli Province in Turkey. Its population is 249 (2022).
