= Akıncılar, Denizli Province =

Village in Turkey

Akıncılar
- Neighbourhood
- Location in Turkey Akıncılar (Turkey Aegean)
- Coordinates: 37.6425°N 28.8476°E
- Country: Turkey
- Province: Denizli
- District: Tavas
- Population (2022): 84
- Time zone: UTC+3 (TRT)

Akıncılar is a neighbourhood in the municipality and district of Tavas, Denizli Province in Turkey. Its population is 84 (2022).
