= Çulhalar, Koçarlı =

Çulhalar
- Neighbourhood
- Location in Turkey Çulhalar (Turkey Aegean)
- Coordinates: 37.741°N 27.696°E
- Country: Turkey
- Province: Aydın
- District: Koçarlı
- Population (2022): 343
- Time zone: UTC+3 (TRT)

Çulhalar is a neighbourhood in the municipality and district of Koçarlı, Aydın Province, Turkey. Its population is 343 (2022).
