= Solmaz, Tavas =

Village in Turkey

Solmaz
- Neighbourhood
- Country: Turkey
- Province: Denizli
- District: Tavas
- Population (2022): 500
- Time zone: UTC+3 (TRT)

Solmaz is a neighbourhood of the municipality and district of Tavas, Denizli Province, Turkey. Its population is 500 (2022). Before the 2013 reorganisation, it was a town (belde).
