= Çalıköy, Tavas =

Village in Turkey

Çalıköy
- Neighbourhood
- Location in Turkey Çalıköy (Turkey Aegean)
- Coordinates: 37.5906°N 28.9096°E
- Country: Turkey
- Province: Denizli
- District: Tavas
- Population (2022): 452
- Time zone: UTC+3 (TRT)

Çalıköy is a neighbourhood in the municipality and district of Tavas, Denizli Province in Turkey. Its population is 452 (2022).
