= Çeşmeköy, Koçarlı =

Çeşmeköy
- Neighbourhood
- Location in Turkey Çeşmeköy (Turkey Aegean)
- Coordinates: 37.6556°N 27.7286°E
- Country: Turkey
- Province: Aydın
- District: Koçarlı
- Population (2022): 239
- Time zone: UTC+3 (TRT)

Çeşmeköy is a neighbourhood in the municipality and district of Koçarlı, Aydın Province, Turkey. Its population is 239 (2022).
