= Alpa, Tavas =

Village in Turkey

Alpa
- Neighbourhood
- Location in Turkey Alpa (Turkey Aegean)
- Coordinates: 37.2146°N 29.0521°E
- Country: Turkey
- Province: Denizli
- District: Tavas
- Population (2022): 200
- Time zone: UTC+3 (TRT)

Alpa is a neighbourhood in the municipality and district of Tavas, Denizli Province in Turkey. Its population is 200 (2022).
