= Bağcılar, Koçarlı =

Bağcılar
- Neighbourhood
- Location in Turkey Bağcılar (Turkey Aegean)
- Coordinates: 37.7318°N 27.6398°E
- Country: Turkey
- Province: Aydın
- District: Koçarlı
- Population (2022): 558
- Time zone: UTC+3 (TRT)

Bağcılar is a neighbourhood in the municipality and district of Koçarlı, Aydın Province, Turkey. Its population is 558 (2022).
