= Çağırgan, Tavas =

Village in Turkey

Çağırgan
- Neighbourhood
- Location in Turkey Çağırgan (Turkey Aegean)
- Coordinates: 37.3301°N 29.0223°E
- Country: Turkey
- Province: Denizli
- District: Tavas
- Population (2022): 759
- Time zone: UTC+3 (TRT)

Çağırgan is a neighbourhood of the municipality and district of Tavas, Denizli Province, Turkey. Its population is 759 (2022). Before the 2013 reorganisation, it was a town (belde).
