= Sapalan, Koçarlı =

Sapalan
- Neighbourhood
- Location in Turkey Sapalan (Turkey Aegean)
- Coordinates: 37°38′N 27°45′E
- Country: Turkey
- Province: Aydın
- District: Koçarlı
- Population (2022): 106
- Time zone: UTC+3 (TRT)

Sapalan is a neighbourhood in the municipality and district of Koçarlı, Aydın Province, Turkey. Its population is 106 (2022).
