= Yeni, Tavas =

Village in Turkey

Yeni
- Neighbourhood
- Location in Turkey Yeni (Turkey Aegean)
- Coordinates: 37°34′29″N 29°04′34″E
- Country: Turkey
- Province: Denizli
- District: Tavas
- Population (2022): 2,122
- Time zone: UTC+3 (TRT)

Yeni is a neighbourhood in the municipality and district of Tavas, Denizli Province in Turkey. Its population is 2,122 (2022).
