= Bağarcık, Koçarlı =

Bağarcık
- Neighbourhood
- Location in Turkey Bağarcık (Turkey Aegean)
- Coordinates: 37°32′N 27°38′E
- Country: Turkey
- Province: Aydın
- District: Koçarlı
- Population (2022): 158
- Time zone: UTC+3 (TRT)

Bağarcık is a neighbourhood in the municipality and district of Koçarlı, Aydın Province, Turkey. Its population is 158 (2022).
