= Kızılcabölük, Tavas =

Village in Turkey

Kızılcabölük
- Neighbourhood
- Location in Turkey Kızılcabölük (Turkey Aegean)
- Coordinates: 37°36′47″N 29°00′54″E
- Country: Turkey
- Province: Denizli
- District: Tavas
- Population (2022): 3,392
- Time zone: UTC+3 (TRT)

Kızılcabölük is a neighbourhood of the municipality and district of Tavas, Denizli Province, Turkey. Its population is 3,392 (2022). Before the 2013 reorganisation, it was a town (belde).

== See also ==
Kızılcabölükspor
