= Yeni, Bago =

Yeni (Burmese: ရေနီ; also known as Yay Ni) is a city in the Bago Region of Myanmar, located 216 miles (348 km) from Yangon, towards the northern end of the division, with mountain ranges to both east and west.

It is the northern edge of the Bago Region. After Yeni, the Mandalay Region starts.
