= Louis Robert (historian) =

French epigrapher (1904–1985)

- Born: 15 February 1904; Laurière, Limousin, France
- Died: 31 May 1985 (aged 81); Paris, France
- Occupation: Professor

Academic background
- Education: École Normale Supérieure
- Influences: Maurice Holleaux, Adolf Wilhelm, Paul Vidal de La Blache

Academic work
- Discipline: Greek history, Epigraphy
- Institutions: École pratique des hautes études (1932–1974), Collège de France (1939–1974), Institut français d'archéologie d'Istanbul (1956–1964)
- Notable students: Pierre Vidal-Naquet, Paul Veyne
- Main interests: Historical geography of Anatolia, Post-classical history
- Notable works: Villes d'Asie Mineure

Louis Robert (15 February 1904 in Laurière – 31 May 1985 in Paris) was a French professor of Greek history and Epigraphy at the Collège de France, and author of many volumes and articles on Greek epigraphy (from the archaic period to Late Antiquity), numismatics, and historical geography. He was an international authority on the history, geography, toponymy and archaeology of ancient Asia Minor.

== Life ==
=== Education and formative years ===
Robert was the son of a tax collector and the grandson of a country doctor from the region of Limousin in historical Occitania. His father died prematurely in 1905 and his mother took her two sons first to Limoges, where Robert attended the Lycée Gay-Lussac (fr) and then to Paris, where he completed his pre-university education at the Lycée Louis-le-Grand.

Robert studied at the École Normale Supérieure from 1924 to 1927, and joined the École française d'Athènes after his graduation. His research in Athens was cut short by tuberculosis, which forced him to spend two years in a sanatorium in Leysin. He used this time to study the early modern antiquarian travel accounts of the Aegean and the Levant, which proved influential for his own work – he would later be called “the last of the great Anatolian travelers”. On his recovery in 1932 he accepted the offer to join the American Society for Archaeological Research in Asia Minor for a mission of exploration in Turkey, at which point his interests shifted permanently from Greece to Asia Minor.

=== Academic career and recognition ===
In 1932, Robert received a teaching position in Historical Geography of the Hellenic World at the École pratique des hautes études (IVth section) in Paris. He taught there until his retirement in 1974. In 1939, he was also made full professor at the Collège de France, where he took up the chair in Greek Antiquity and Epigraphy vacated at the death of his mentor Maurice Holleaux in 1932.

He was elected a member of the Académie des Inscriptions et Belles-Lettres in 1948 at the recommendation of the hellenist Paul Mazon (fr). He served as its president twice. He was also a corresponding fellow of the British Academy (1946), a member of the German Academy of Sciences at Berlin (corresponding member 1950, foreign member 1969), an associate member of the Royal Academy of Belgium (1955), a foreign member of the Accademia dei Lincei (1959), an international honorary member of the American Academy of Arts and Sciences (1961), a foreign member of the Academy of Athens (1966), and a member of the Austrian and Polish Academies of Sciences. He received an honorary doctorate from the University of Louvain and the National Order of the Legion of Honour.

=== Work and legacy ===
Robert conducted excavations in Turkey at Amyzon in Caria (1949–50) and at Claros in Ionia (1950–61). He was the director of the Institut français d'études anatoliennes (fr) in 1956–64 and assisted as an epigrapher with the Archaeological Exploration of Sardis launched in 1958.

The hallmark of Robert's approach is the combination of philology with geography in an effort to produce a vivid account of historical environment. While his work emphasised regional divergences and local human agency, it also tended – due to Robert's romanticised approach to geographical exploration – to underestimate the historical mutability of landscape. Robert's key interests included the ancient economy and religion, Hellenisation and Romanisation, and the transformations of late antiquity, but his impact within the discipline of Classics has been limited by his excessive focus on detail and has endured most visibly in the fields of epigraphy and historical geography. Notably, his treatment of Anatolian history and material culture extended beyond classical antiquity to the Byzantine and Ottoman periods.

The Académie des Inscriptions et Belles-Lettres preserves his archive of notes, photographs, correspondence, estampages, and numismatic material as Fonds Louis Robert.

=== Personal life ===
Robert married Jeanne Vanseveren in 1938. Fluent in Greek and Turkish, she was his research and travel companion and the co-author of many of his publications until his death in 1985.

== Selected bibliography ==
- Villes d'Asie Mineure. Études de géographie ancienne, 1935 (2nd edition, with an ample postface, 1962)
- Collection Froehner, Inscriptions grecques, 1936.
- Études anatoliennes. Recherches sur les inscriptions grecques de l'Asie Mineure, 1937.
- Études épigraphiques et philologiques, 1938.
- Les gladiateurs dans l'Orient grec, 1940.
- Hellenica, Recueil d'épigraphie de numismatique et d'antiquités grecques (13 volumes), 1940–1965.
- Le sanctuaire du dieu Sinuri près de Mylasa, 1945.
- Études de numismatique grecque, 1951.
- La Carie: histoire et géographie historique avec le recueil des inscriptions antiques. Le plateau de Tabai et ses environs (with Jeanne Robert), 1954 (vol. 2 of a projected 4-volume publication that never saw publication)
- Lettres d'un évêque de Synnada, 1962.
- Noms indigènes dans l'Asie Mineure gréco-romaine, 1963.
- La déesse de Hiérapolis Castabala, 1964.
- Stèles funéraires de Byzance gréco-romaine, 1964.
- Nouvelles inscriptions de Sardes, 1964.
- Documents de l'Asie Mineure méridionale, 1966.
- Monnaies antiques en Troade, 1966
- Monnaies grecques, 1967.
- Épigrammes satiriques de Lucillius, 1967.
- Inscriptions de Laodicée du Lycos, 1969.
- Opera minora selecta (7 vols.), 1969–1990 (reprinted articles).
- À travers l'Asie Mineure, Poètes et prosateurs, monnaies grecques, voyageurs et géographie, 1980.
- Fouilles d'Amyzon en Carie. Exploration, histoire, monnaies et inscriptions (with Jeanne Robert), 1983.
- Documents d'Asie Mineure, 1987.
- Claros I. Décrets hellénistiques (with Jeanne Robert), 1989.
- Le martyre de Pionios, prêtre de Smyrne (edition, completed by Glen Bowersock and Christopher P. Jones), 1994.
- Choix d’écrits, 2007 (contains the complete bibliography of Robert at pp. 22–61).

== Sources ==
- Bowersock, Glen W. (1986), "Louis Robert, 1904–1985", American Journal of Archaeology, 90 (2): 171–172, doi:10.1086/AJS505429, S2CID 245265457
- Bowersock, Glen W. (2008), "Louis Robert: La gloire et la joie d'une vie consacrée à l'Antiquité grecque", Comptes rendus des séances de l'Académie des Inscriptions et Belles-Lettres, 152: 1557–1573
- Grimal, Pierre (1985), "Allocution à la mémoire de M. Louis Robert, membre de l'Académie décédé le 31 mai 1985", Comptes rendus des séances de l'Académie des Inscriptions et Belles-Lettres, 129 (2): 344–347
- Lacroix, Léon (1986), "Louis Robert (1904-1985)", Bulletin de la Classe des lettres et des sciences morales et politiques, 72: 241–251, ISSN 0001-4133
- Ma, John (2009), "Review of Choix d'Écrits by Louis Robert, ed. Denis Rousset with Philippe Gauthier and Ivana Savalli-Lestrade", Classical Review, 59: 205–208, doi:10.1017/S0009840X08002539, S2CID 161124648
- Malay, Hasan (1995), "Louis Robert (1904-1985)" (PDF), Arkeoloji Dergisi, 3: 1–4
- Pouilloux, Jean (1986), "Notice sur la vie et les travaux de Louis Robert, membre de l'Académie", Comptes rendus des séances de l'Académie des Inscriptions et Belles-Lettres, 130 (2): 356–366
- Rousset, Denis (2019-10-14), Louis Robert, École pratique des hautes études
- Thonemann, Peter (2009), "Asia Minor", in Erskine, Andrew (ed.), A Companion to Ancient History, Chichester: Wiley-Blackwell, pp. 222–235
- Whittow, Mark (2013), "The Maeander valley in the Long Ancient World: or, Why bother with archaeology? (Review of The Maeander Valley by Peter Thonemann)", Journal of Roman Archaeology, 26: 914–924, doi:10.1017/S1047759413001037, S2CID 161904906
