= Jean-Louis Ferrary =

French historian (1948–2020)

Jean-Louis Ferrary (May 5, 1948 – August 9, 2020) was a French historian, a specialist in ancient Rome.

== Biography ==
Born in 1948 in Orléans, Jean-Louis Ferrary entered the École Normale Supérieure in 1967 and obtained his agrégation in Classical Letters in 1970. A member of the École française de Rome from 1973 to 1976, he was then elected a lecturer at the Sorbonne University and continued his career at the École pratique des hautes études, where he has been a lecturer (1983) and director of studies (since 1989). His lecture title was « Histoire des institutions et des idées politiques du monde romain ». He received his PhD in 1987 after working under the direction of Pierre Grimal and Claude Nicolet. His thesis, Philhellénisme et impérialisme : aspects idéologiques de la conquête romaine du monde hellénistique, is a milestone in the study of the relations between Rome and the Greek world.

Jean-Louis Ferrary was interested in the history of institutions, law and the laws of ancient Rome, in the history of ideas and the ancient political philosophy, in Greek and Latin epigraphy of Roman times, Latin philology and historiography.

He was elected to the Académie des Inscriptions et Belles-Lettres in 2005, succeeding Maurice Euzennat. He was a specialist of Polybius and Cicero. He was elected to the American Philosophical Society in 2019. He died in Paris.

== Honours ==
- Knight of the Legion of Honour (France)
- Knight of the National Order of Merit (France)
- Commander of the Ordre des Palmes Académiques (France)

== Main publications ==
- Philhellénisme et impérialisme. Aspects idéologiques de la conquête romaine du monde hellénistique, Rome, BEFAR, 1988
- Onofrio Panvinio et les Antiquités romaines, Rome, Collection de l’École Française de Rome, 1996
- Recherches sur les lois comitiales et sur le droit public romain, Pavie, Pavia University Press, 2012
- Les mémoriaux de délégations de Claros, d’après la documentation conservée dans le Fonds Jeanne et Louis Robert, Paris, De Boccard, 2015
- Rome et le monde grec : Choix d'écrits, Paris, Les Belles Lettres, 2016
- Dall'ordine repubblicano ai poteri di Augusto : aspetti della legislazione romana, Rome, L'Erma di Bretschneider, 2016
- Quintus Mucius Scævola : Opra, Rome, L'Erma di Bretschneider, coll. « Scriptores iuris Romani », 2018
