= Tekeli, Koçarlı =

Tekeli
- Neighbourhood
- Country: Turkey
- Province: Aydın
- District: Koçarlı
- Population (2022): 267
- Time zone: UTC+3 (TRT)

Tekeli is a neighbourhood in the municipality and district of Koçarlı, Aydın Province, Turkey. Its population is 267 (2022).
