= Gümüşdere, Tavas =

Village in Turkey

Gümüşdere
- Neighbourhood
- Country: Turkey
- Province: Denizli
- District: Tavas
- Population (2022): 398
- Time zone: UTC+3 (TRT)

Gümüşdere is a neighbourhood in the municipality and district of Tavas, Denizli Province in Turkey. Its population is 398 (2022).
