= Büyükdere, Koçarlı =

Büyükdere
- Neighbourhood
- Location in Turkey Büyükdere (Turkey Aegean)
- Coordinates: 37.7614°N 27.6929°E
- Country: Turkey
- Province: Aydın
- District: Koçarlı
- Population (2022): 496
- Time zone: UTC+3 (TRT)

Büyükdere is a neighbourhood in the municipality and district of Koçarlı, Aydın Province, Turkey. Its population is 496 (2022).
