= Kızılcabölük, Koçarlı =

Kızılcabölük
- Neighbourhood
- Location in Turkey Kızılcabölük (Turkey Aegean)
- Coordinates: 37.5667°N 27.6833°E
- Country: Turkey
- Province: Aydın
- District: Koçarlı
- Population (2022): 632
- Time zone: UTC+3 (TRT)

Kızılcabölük is a neighbourhood in the municipality and district of Koçarlı, Aydın Province, Turkey. Its population is 632 (2022).
