= Kadıköy, Aydın =

Kadıköy
- Neighbourhood
- Location in Turkey Kadıköy (Turkey Aegean)
- Coordinates: 37.799°N 27.801°E
- Country: Turkey
- Province: Aydın
- District: Efeler
- Population (2022): 1,752
- Time zone: UTC+3 (TRT)

Kadıköy is a neighbourhood in the municipality and district of Efeler, Aydın Province, Turkey. Its population is 1,752 (2022).
