= Koçarlı =

- District and municipality
- Map showing Koçarlı District in Aydın Province

- Location in Turkey Koçarlı (Turkey Aegean)
- Coordinates: 37°45′39″N 27°42′22″E
- Country: Turkey
- Province: Aydın

Government
  - Mayor: Nedim Kaplan (AKP)
- Area: 455 km^{2} (176 sq mi)
- Population (2022): 21,832
  - Density: 48.0/km^{2} (124/sq mi)
- Time zone: UTC+3 (TRT)
- Postal code: 09970
- Area code: 0256
- Website: www.kocarli.bel.tr

Koçarlı is a municipality and district of Aydın Province, Turkey. Its area is 455 km^{2}, and its population is 21,832 (2022). It is 24 km (15 mi) from the city of Aydın.

== Geography ==
Koçarlı is a small town and although there is an institute of Adnan Menderes University and thus a small student population, the population of the area is shrinking as people take their families to seek education and careers in Turkey's larger cities. This is an attractive district of agricultural villages in the middle of the Büyük Menderes River valley on hillsides above the Koçarlı River. The main crops are cotton, olives and pine nuts, other activities include grazing animals and producing other crops including figs and chestnuts. Industry is basically factories for processing these crops and repairing farm implements with the exception of an aluminum processing plant nearby.

== Composition ==
There are 52 neighbourhoods in Koçarlı District:

- Adnan Menderes
- Akmescit
- Atatürk
- Bağarcık
- Bağcılar
- Birci
- Bıyıklı
- Boğaziçi
- Boydere
- Büyükdere
- Çakırbeyli
- Çakmar
- Çallı
- Çeşmeköy
- Cincin
- Çulhalar
- Dedeköy
- Dereköy
- Esentepe
- Evsekler
- Gaffarlar
- Gözkaya
- Güdüşlü
- Gündoğan
- Hacıhamzalar
- Halilbeyli
- Haydarlı
- Karaağaç
- Karacaören
- Karadut
- Kasaplar
- Kızılcabölük
- Kızılkaya
- Kullar
- Kuşlarbeleni
- Mersinbeleni
- Orhaniye
- Orta
- Şahinciler
- Sapalan
- Satılar
- Şenköy
- Sobuca
- Taşköy
- Tekeli
- Tığıllar
- Timinciler
- Yağcıdere
- Yağhanlı
- Yenimahalle
- Yeniköy
- Zeytinköy

== Places of interest ==
- Koçarlı is notable for a mosque, tower, and other landmark buildings built by the 18th century - 19th century feudal lords (derebey) of the region who were native to Koçarlı, the Cihanoğlu family. Their biggest monument is the castle in the village of Cincin.
- The ruins of the ancient city of Amyzon (Mazın), in the village of Akmescit, 30km south of Koçarlı.
- The Traditional Pine Nut Festival attracts many visitors to the town, held every year at the end of May.
