= Çakırbeyli, Koçarlı =

Çakırbeyli
- Neighbourhood
- Location in Turkey Çakırbeyli (Turkey Aegean)
- Coordinates: 37°44′05″N 27°49′26″E
- Country: Turkey
- Province: Aydın
- District: Koçarlı
- Population (2022): 560
- Time zone: UTC+3 (TRT)

Çakırbeyli is a neighbourhood in the municipality and district of Koçarlı, Aydın Province, Turkey. Its population is 560 (2022).
