= Yeniköy, Koçarlı =

Yeniköy
- Neighbourhood
- Location in Turkey Yeniköy (Turkey Aegean)
- Coordinates: 37.7667°N 27.6000°E
- Country: Turkey
- Province: Aydın
- District: Koçarlı
- Population (2022): 1,087
- Time zone: UTC+3 (TRT)

Yeniköy is a neighbourhood of the municipality and district of Koçarlı, Aydın Province, Turkey. Its population was 1,087 in 202. Before the 2013 reorganisation, it was a belde (town).
