= Gündoğan, Koçarlı =

Village in Turkey

Gündoğan
- Neighbourhood
- Location in Turkey Gündoğan (Turkey Aegean)
- Coordinates: 37°47′08″N 27°42′53″E
- Country: Turkey
- Province: Aydın
- District: Koçarlı
- Population (2024): 883
- Time zone: UTC+3 (TRT)

Gündoğan is a neighbourhood in the municipality and district of Koçarlı, Aydın Province, Turkey. Its population is 883 (2024).
