= Akmescit, Koçarlı =

Akmescit
- Neighbourhood
- Location in Turkey Akmescit (Turkey Aegean)
- Coordinates: 37.5833°N 27.7000°E
- Country: Turkey
- Province: Aydın
- District: Koçarlı
- Population (2022): 305
- Time zone: UTC+3 (TRT)

Akmescit is a neighbourhood in the municipality and district of Koçarlı, Aydın Province, Turkey. Its population is 305 (2022).
