= List of Turkish wine regions =

The following is a list of Turkish wine regions. Anatolia played a pivotal role in the early history of wine and is likely to have been one of the earliest wine-producing regions of the world.

Turkey is geographically located on the wine belt thanks to its suitable climatic conditions and soil character. The vineyards in Turkey cover an area of 1,000,000 ha (2,500,000 acres). Annual grape harvest in Turkey accounts for 3.6 million tonnes putting it on the 6th place in the world. However, only 2% of that amount is suitable for wine production. Wine production was neglected in Turkey primarily on the grounds of religion. Major wine regions are Aegean, East Thrace and Marmara and Central Anatolia.

Map of Turkish wine regions

Share of wine regions in Turkish wine production.
1. East Thrace and Marmara (13.6%)
2. Aegean (52.7%)
3. Mediterranean (0.20%)
4. Mid-southern Anatolia (12.1%)
5. Mid-northern Anatolia (3.30%)
6. Mid-eastern Anatolia (14.7%)
7. South-east Anatolia (3.40%)

== East Thrace and Marmara wine region ==
The East Thrace and Marmara wine region is situated south of Bulgaria and southeast of Greece, bordering the Black Sea, Marmara Sea and the Aegean Sea. Annual precipitation is between 500–1,000 mm (20–39 in). The observed mean temperature over a long term lies between 12–15 °C (54–59 °F) with an average of quite high humidity of 73%. The soil of the region is composed mainly of limestone, gravelly loam and dense cracking clay. The grape varieties typical to this region are Adakarası, Cabernet Franc, Cabernet Sauvignon, Chardonnay, Cinsaut, Gamay, Kalecik Karası, Merlot, Papazkarası, Riesling, Sauvignon blanc, Semillion, Syrah and Viognier. The Marmara wine region contributes to all the wine produced in Turkey with 13.6%.

== Aegean wine region ==
The Aegean wine region consists of viticultural areas in the Aegean Region of Turkey, which are mainly in the provinces of Manisa, İzmir and Denizli. Winemaking areas like Eceabat and Bozcaada, districts of Çanakkale Province and geographically part of the Marmara Region, are considered within this wine region. The climate on the coastal areas is maritime, typical Mediterranean with hot summers and mild winters, while on the Anatolian plateau it is continental with less rainfall. Vineyards at the coastal area are at an elevation of around 150 m (490 ft) and the ones at the inland parts are at around 900 m (3,000 ft). The temperatures vary between 16 and 19 °C (61 and 66 °F) at the coastal areas and 12–16 °C (54–61 °F) at inland areas reaching highs to 40 °C (104 °F) in the summer and −10 °C (14 °F) in the winter outmost. Annual average precipitation is 550 mm (22 in) varying from 400 to 1,000 mm (16 to 39 in). The soil of the region consists partly of clay loam and is also calcareous (chalk and limestone). Alicante Bouschet, Boğazkere, Bornova Misketi, Cabernet Franc, Cabernet Sauvignon, Carignan, Chardonnay, Çalkarası, Çavuş, Dimrit, Grenache, Kalecik Karası, Karalahna, Karasakız (Kuntra), Malbec, Merlot, Mourvèdre, Narince, Öküzgözü, Petit Verdot, Pinot noir, Sangiovese, Sauvignon Blanc, Syrah, Sultaniye, Tempranillo, Vasilaki and Viognier are the grape varieties of the region. The Aegean wine region produces about 52.7% of the wine in Turkey.

== Mediterranean wine region ==
The southernmost wine region of Turkey is the Mediterranean including wine production mainly in Antalya Province and Mersin Province. The climate of the region is typical Mediterranean characterized with hot summers and mild winters. Annual precipitation is in the range of 400–1,000 mm (16–39 in). Average temperature observed the year around is between 16 and 19 °C (61 and 66 °F). The soil found here varies from pebbly clay loam to calcareous chalks. The regions wine varieties are Boğazkere, Cabernet Sauvignon, Chardonnay, Kalecik Karas›, Malbec, Merlot, Öküzgözü, Pinot Noir, Sauvignon Blanc and Syrah. The region's contribution to the Turkey's wine production is only 0.2%.

== Mid-southern Anatolia wine region ==
The Mid-southern Anatolia wine region consists of the provinces Kayseri, Kırşehir, Aksarayi and Niğde in east of Central Anatolia. The climate has a continental character with hot dry summers and cold winters. At the Cappadocia steppes, the daily temperature shows a big difference between day and night. Annual precipitation differs from 400 to 600 mm (16 to 24 in) with a mean value of 500 mm (20 in). The temperature lies between 8–12 °C (46–54 °F) in the long term. The soil found in the region is sand, sandstone, decomposed volcanic tuff, the latter contributing to good quality grapes for wine production. Chardonnay, Dimrit, Emir, Kalecik Karası, Malbec, Narince, Öküzgözü, Sauvignon Blanc, Tempranillo are the grape varieties of the region. 12.1% of the country's wine production comes out of the region.

== Mid-northern Anatolia wine region ==
The Mid-northern Anatolia wine region includes the vineyards of Uşak Province in the west and Ankara Province in mid-north of Central Anatolia. The region's climate is continental with hot dry summers and cold winters. Annual precipitation varies between 200–400 mm (7.9–15.7 in) around the average of 300 mm (12 in). The average temperature year around is in the range of 8–12 °C (46–54 °F). Main soil type is pebbly clay loam. Wine varieties of the region are Boğazkere, Kalecik Karası, Öküzgözü and Syrah. The wine production of the Mid-northern Anatolia region makes out 3.3% of Turkey's total production.

== Mid-eastern Anatolia wine region ==
The Mid-eastern Anatolia wine region includes the wine areas of Tokat Province in the north, Elazığ Province and Malatya Province in the east. The climate of Tokat area shows a transition between the Central Black Sea and the Central Anatolia climates while the climate of Elazığ and Malatya is typical terrestrial. Annual precipitation ranges from 600 to 1,000 mm (24 to 39 in) with a mean of 750 mm (30 in). In the long term, the temperature varies between 8 and 12 °C (46 and 54 °F). In Tokat, the soil is glaciated alluvial fan and Yeşilırmak river bed. In the Elazığ and Malatya area, it ranges from red clay to decomposed granite and chalky clay. Typical grape varieties of the region are Narince, Boğazkere and Öküzgözü. The region produces 14.7% of all the country's wine.

== Southeast Anatolia wine region ==
Diyarbakır Province is the main wine growing area in Southeastern Anatolia. The climate is terrestrial characterized with dry, very hot days and cold nights in the summer time. The precipitation ranges from 600 to 1,000 mm (24 to 39 in). The year-around average temperature is between 14–18 °C (57–64 °F). The soil differs from decomposed sandstone to red clay. Boğazkere is the main grape variety of the region, which produces 3.4% of Turkey's wine.

Wine region	Wine grape varieties	Province	Place	Winery
Marmara wine region	White: Sauvignon blanc, Clairette blanche, Chardonnay, Riesling, Sauvignon gris, Pinot gris, Sémillon, Beylerce, Yapıncak, Vasilaki, Viognier, Alvarinho, Narince; Red: Cabernet Sauvignon, Merlot, Cabernet Franc, Pinot noir, Adakarası, Papazkarası, Sémillon, Kuntra, Gamay, Karalahna, Cinsault, Malbec, Petit Verdot	Kırklareli	Kırklareli, Lüleburgaz, Büyükkarıştıran	Saranta, Arcadia, Chamlija, Vino Dessera, Gürbüz
Marmara wine region	White: Sauvignon blanc, Clairette blanche, Chardonnay, Riesling, Sauvignon gris, Pinot gris, Sémillon, Beylerce, Yapıncak, Vasilaki, Viognier, Alvarinho, Narince; Red: Cabernet Sauvignon, Merlot, Cabernet Franc, Pinot noir, Adakarası, Papazkarası, Sémillon, Kuntra, Gamay, Karalahna, Cinsault, Malbec, Petit Verdot	Tekirdağ	Şarköy; Mürefte, Yazır, Çerkezköy	Doluca, Gülor, Kutman, Bağcı, Latif Aral, Melen, Umurbey, Barbare, Chateau Nuzun, Chateau Kalpak
Marmara wine region	White: Sauvignon blanc, Clairette blanche, Chardonnay, Riesling, Sauvignon gris, Pinot gris, Sémillon, Beylerce, Yapıncak, Vasilaki, Viognier, Alvarinho, Narince; Red: Cabernet Sauvignon, Merlot, Cabernet Franc, Pinot noir, Adakarası, Papazkarası, Sémillon, Kuntra, Gamay, Karalahna, Cinsault, Malbec, Petit Verdot	Balıkesir	Avşa; Marmara Island, Yiğitler	Bortaçina, Büyülübağ
Marmara wine region	White: Sauvignon blanc, Clairette blanche, Chardonnay, Riesling, Sauvignon gris, Pinot gris, Sémillon, Beylerce, Yapıncak, Vasilaki, Viognier, Alvarinho, Narince; Red: Cabernet Sauvignon, Merlot, Cabernet Franc, Pinot noir, Adakarası, Papazkarası, Sémillon, Kuntra, Gamay, Karalahna, Cinsault, Malbec, Petit Verdot	Istanbul	Kemerburgaz	Paşaeli
Aegean wine region	White: Sémillon, Sauvignon blanc, Chardonnay, Chenin blanc, Viognier, Muscat blanc à petits grains, Bornova Misketi, Trebbiano; Red: Carignan, Çal Karası, Merlot, Cabernet Sauvignon, Alicante Bouschet, Shiraz, Kalecik Karası, Pinot noir, Sangiovese, Montepulciano, Grenache, Tannat, Petit Verdot, Cabernet Franc	Çanakkale	Bozcaada, Gelibolu, Eceabat	Talay, Çamlıbağ, Ataol, Sezer, Amadeus, Corvus, Gali, Suvla
Aegean wine region	White: Sémillon, Sauvignon blanc, Chardonnay, Chenin blanc, Viognier, Muscat blanc à petits grains, Bornova Misketi, Trebbiano; Red: Carignan, Çal Karası, Merlot, Cabernet Sauvignon, Alicante Bouschet, Shiraz, Kalecik Karası, Pinot noir, Sangiovese, Montepulciano, Grenache, Tannat, Petit Verdot, Cabernet Franc	Manisa	Akhisar, Kula	Kastro Tireli, Yanık Ülke
Aegean wine region	White: Sémillon, Sauvignon blanc, Chardonnay, Chenin blanc, Viognier, Muscat blanc à petits grains, Bornova Misketi, Trebbiano; Red: Carignan, Çal Karası, Merlot, Cabernet Sauvignon, Alicante Bouschet, Shiraz, Kalecik Karası, Pinot noir, Sangiovese, Montepulciano, Grenache, Tannat, Petit Verdot, Cabernet Franc	Denizli	Bekilli, Güney	Biricik, Küp, Pamukkale
Aegean wine region	White: Sémillon, Sauvignon blanc, Chardonnay, Chenin blanc, Viognier, Muscat blanc à petits grains, Bornova Misketi, Trebbiano; Red: Carignan, Çal Karası, Merlot, Cabernet Sauvignon, Alicante Bouschet, Shiraz, Kalecik Karası, Pinot noir, Sangiovese, Montepulciano, Grenache, Tannat, Petit Verdot, Cabernet Franc	İzmir	Torbalı, Urla, Kemalpaşa, Bornova, Selçuk	LA, Mozaik, Nif, Öküzgözü, Urla, USCA, Urlice, MMG, Yedi Bilgeler, Perdix, Çakır, Vinaida
Aegean wine region	White: Sémillon, Sauvignon blanc, Chardonnay, Chenin blanc, Viognier, Muscat blanc à petits grains, Bornova Misketi, Trebbiano; Red: Carignan, Çal Karası, Merlot, Cabernet Sauvignon, Alicante Bouschet, Shiraz, Kalecik Karası, Pinot noir, Sangiovese, Montepulciano, Grenache, Tannat, Petit Verdot, Cabernet Franc	Isparta		
Aegean wine region	White: Sémillon, Sauvignon blanc, Chardonnay, Chenin blanc, Viognier, Muscat blanc à petits grains, Bornova Misketi, Trebbiano; Red: Carignan, Çal Karası, Merlot, Cabernet Sauvignon, Alicante Bouschet, Shiraz, Kalecik Karası, Pinot noir, Sangiovese, Montepulciano, Grenache, Tannat, Petit Verdot, Cabernet Franc	Muğla	Bodrum	Vinbodrum, Garova
Aegean wine region	White: Sémillon, Sauvignon blanc, Chardonnay, Chenin blanc, Viognier, Muscat blanc à petits grains, Bornova Misketi, Trebbiano; Red: Carignan, Çal Karası, Merlot, Cabernet Sauvignon, Alicante Bouschet, Shiraz, Kalecik Karası, Pinot noir, Sangiovese, Montepulciano, Grenache, Tannat, Petit Verdot, Cabernet Franc	Burdur		
Aegean wine region	White: Sémillon, Sauvignon blanc, Chardonnay, Chenin blanc, Viognier, Muscat blanc à petits grains, Bornova Misketi, Trebbiano; Red: Carignan, Çal Karası, Merlot, Cabernet Sauvignon, Alicante Bouschet, Shiraz, Kalecik Karası, Pinot noir, Sangiovese, Montepulciano, Grenache, Tannat, Petit Verdot, Cabernet Franc	Aydın	Aydın	Prodom, Sevilen
Mediterranean wine region	White: Kabarcık, Dökülgen; Red: Sergi Karası, Burdur Dimriti, Acıkara, Fersun, Merzifon Karası, Tilkikuyruğu	Antalya	Elmalı	Likya
Mediterranean wine region	White: Kabarcık, Dökülgen; Red: Sergi Karası, Burdur Dimriti, Acıkara, Fersun, Merzifon Karası, Tilkikuyruğu	Mersin		
Mid-southern Anatolia wine region	White: Emir, Hasandede; Red: Kalecik Karası, Papazkarası, Dimrit	Nevşehir	Ürgüp; Göreme; Avanos; Gülşehir	Kocabağ, Turasan, Taskobirlik
Mid-southern Anatolia wine region	White: Emir, Hasandede; Red: Kalecik Karası, Papazkarası, Dimrit	Kayseri		Vinolus
Mid-northern Anatolia wine region	White: Emir, Hasandede; Red: Kalecik Karası, Papazkarası, Dimrit	Ankara	Akyurt, Kalecik	Kavaklıdere, Vinkara, Tafalı
Mid-northern Anatolia wine region	White: Emir, Hasandede; Red: Kalecik Karası, Papazkarası, Dimrit	Eskişehir		
Mid-northern Anatolia wine region	White: Emir, Hasandede; Red: Kalecik Karası, Papazkarası, Dimrit	Yozgat		
Mid-northern Anatolia wine region	White: Emir, Hasandede; Red: Kalecik Karası, Papazkarası, Dimrit	Sivas		
Mid-northern Anatolia wine region	White: Emir, Hasandede; Red: Kalecik Karası, Papazkarası, Dimrit	Çankırı		
Mid-eastern Anatolia wine region	White: Narince, Kabarcık; Red: Öküzgözü, Boğazkere	Tokat	Tokat	Diren
Mid-eastern Anatolia wine region	White: Narince, Kabarcık; Red: Öküzgözü, Boğazkere	Elazığ	Elazığ	Kayra, Eskibağlar
Southeast Anatolia wine region	White: Dökülgen, Kabarcık, Rumi; Red: Horoz Karası, Öküzgözü, Boğazkere, Sergi Karası	Şanlıurfa		
Southeast Anatolia wine region	White: Dökülgen, Kabarcık, Rumi; Red: Horoz Karası, Öküzgözü, Boğazkere, Sergi Karası	Diyarbakır		

== See also ==
- Turkish wine
