= List of wineries in Turkey =

List of wine producers in Turkey

This is a list of wineries in Turkey. As of the mid-2020s, there are approximately 140 licensed wineries in Turkey, ranging from large-scale industrial producers to small boutique estates.

The Turkish wine industry is historically centered in the Thrace, Aegean, and Central Anatolia regions, though significant production also occurs in Eastern Anatolia and the Mediterranean. The industry is composed of a few large, long-standing companies that dominate the market volume and a growing number of boutique wineries established largely since the 1990s.

== Major wineries ==
The following is a list of notable commercial wineries in Turkey.

Notable Wineries in Turkey
Name	Established	Headquarters / Region	Notes
Arcadia Vineyards	2000s	Kırklareli, Thrace	Located in the Strandja mountains; practices sustainable agriculture and operates a vineyard hotel and spa.
Barbare Wines	2000	Tekirdağ, Thrace	Focuses on Rhône-style blends (GSM) and Bordeaux blends; uses organic/biodynamic practices.
Chamlija	2000s	Kırklareli, Thrace	Known for championing the indigenous Papazkarası grape and producing premium Chardonnays. Winner of multiple international awards.
Corvus	2002	Bozcaada	Credited with reviving the island's reputation for fine wine and the Vasilaki grape.
Diren	1958	Tokat, Black Sea Region	One of the oldest wineries in the north; specializes in the native Narince grape.
Doluca	1926	Istanbul / Thrace	One of the largest and oldest private producers; founded by Nihat A. Kutman. Creator of the "Sarafin" and "Tuğra" brands.
Gülor Winery	1993	Thrace	One of Turkey's first boutique wineries, founded by Güler Sabancı.
Kavaklıdere	1929	Ankara	The largest private-sector wine producer in Turkey. Notable for reviving Kalecik Karası and owning vineyards in France.
Kayra	2004	Elazığ / Thrace	Formed from the privatization of the state monopoly Tekel. Produces the historic "Buzbağ" brand.
Likya	1990s	Elmalı, Antalya	Located in the high-altitude Taurus Mountains; known for reviving the rare Acıkara grape.
Pamukkale	1962	Denizli	Large family-owned producer leveraging the high yields of the Denizli region; produces the "Anfora" series.
Paşaeli	2000	Aegean	Boutique winery focused on rescuing endangered indigenous grapes like Karasakız, Kolorko, and Sidalan.
Sevilen	1942	İzmir	Historic producer with vineyards in İzmir and Denizli. Known for the premium "900" and "Isabey" series.
Suvla	2000s	Gelibolu, Thrace	Located on the historic Gallipoli peninsula; produces a wide range of organic wines including indigenous blends.
Şato Kalpak	2000s	Tekirdağ, Thrace	A single-estate winery producing only Bordeaux-style blends aged in French oak; known for its gravity-flow facility.
Turasan	1943	Cappadocia	The largest winery in Cappadocia, known for wines made from the local Emir grape and rock-carved cellars.
Urla Winery	2000s	Urla, İzmir	A pioneer of the Urla Vineyard Route; known for reviving the Urla Karası grape and agrotourism.
Vinkara	2000s	Kalecik	Specializes in the Kalecik Karası grape, producing it in red, rosé, and traditional method sparkling (Yaşasın) styles.
Yazgan	1943	İzmir	Historic family-run winery, traditionally a major supplier of table wines.

== See also ==
- Turkish wine
- Agriculture in Turkey
- Grape varieties of Turkey
