= Karapınar (disambiguation) =

Karapınar (literally Black fountain) is a Turkish place name. It may refer to:

== Places ==
- Karapınar, a district in Konya Province, Turkey
- Karapınar, Alanya, a village in Alanya district of Antalya Province, Turkey
- Karapınar, Bismil
- Karapınar, Çal
- Karapınar, Çanakkale
- Karapınar, Çaycuma, a village in Çaycuma district of Zonguldak Province, Turkey
- Karapınar, Çorum
- Karapınar, Dursunbey, a village
- Karapınar, Gölhisar
- Karapınar, Horasan
- Karapınar, Haymana, a village in Haymana district of Ankara Province, Turkey
- Karapınar, Hekimhan, a village in Hekimhan district of Malatya Province, Turkey
- Karapınar, Karakoçan
- Karapınar, Kemaliye
- Karapınar, Kuyucak, a village in Kuyucak district of Aydın Province, Turkey
- Karapınar (Malatya), a village in Hekimhan district of Malatya Province, Turkey
- Karapınar, Mustafakemalpaşa
- Karapınar, Narman
- Karapınar, Ortaköy, a village in Ortaköy district of Aksaray Province, Turkey
- Karapınar, Polatlı, a village in Polatlı district of Ankara Province, Turkey
- Karapınar, Savaştepe, a village
- Karapınar, Sultandağı, a town in Sultandağ district of Afyonkarahisar Province, Turkey
- Karapınar, Vezirköprü, a village in Vezirköprü district of Samsun Province, Turkey
- Karapınar, Zonguldak, a village in central district of Zonguldak Province, Turkey

== Other uses ==
- Karapınar coal mine, a coal mine in Karapınar district of Konya Province, Turkey
- Karapınar Field, a volcanic field in Karapınar, Konya Province, Turkey
- Karapınar Renewable Energy Resource Area, a proposed solar energy plant in Karapınar, Konya Province, Turkey
