= Karalahna =

Variety of grape

- Grape (Vitis)
- Color of berry skin: Noir
- Species: Vitis vinifera
- Origin: Turkey
- Notable regions: Bozcaada
- Notable wines: Corvus, Çamlıbağ, Talay
- Ideal soil: Sandy, mineral-rich
- Sex of flowers: Hermaphrodite
- VIVC number: 6669

Karalahna (meaning "Kale" or "Black Cabbage" in Turkish) is a native Turkish red wine grape variety grown almost exclusively on the island of Bozcaada (Tenedos). Historically, before the privatization of the state alcohol monopoly Tekel, the grape was widely used in the production of Turkish brandy (kanyak) due to its high acidity.

Today, it is used as a wine grape to produce both varietal wines and blends. In Bozcaada, it is frequently blended with the Kuntra (Karasakız) grape variety to balance that grape's lighter structure, or with Merlot.

== Viticulture ==
Karalahna is a late-ripening variety, usually reaching maturity in the second half of September. The bunches are dense and round. The berries are large with a skin of medium thickness. The vine thrives in the windy conditions and sandy soils of Bozcaada.

== Characteristics ==
Karalahna wines are typically deep in color, distinguished by high acidity and a prominent tannic structure. While the variety is naturally tannic, modern vinification techniques can produce fruit-forward styles.

- Body: When vinified alone, it produces medium-to-full-bodied wines.
- Aging: The grape's structure makes it well-suited for oak aging (meşe fıçı).
- Styles: Beyond standard reds, the variety has shown success in the production of fortified wines (strengthened with the addition of alcohol).

=== Aroma Profile ===
The variety is known for a fruit-forward profile dominated by dark fruits.

- Primary notes: Ripe black plum.
- Secondary notes: In well-ripened examples, notes of black cherry and raspberry are common.
- Late harvest: Very ripe examples can develop jammy scents.

== Food Pairing ==
Due to its acidity and structure, Karalahna pairs well with rich and savory foods. Common pairings include:

- Saucy and spicy meat dishes.
- Fatty charcuterie.
- Aged cheeses.

== See also ==
- Turkish wine
- Bozcaada
- Öküzgözü
- Boğazkere
- Kalecik Karası
