= Turkish wine =

Wine production in Turkey

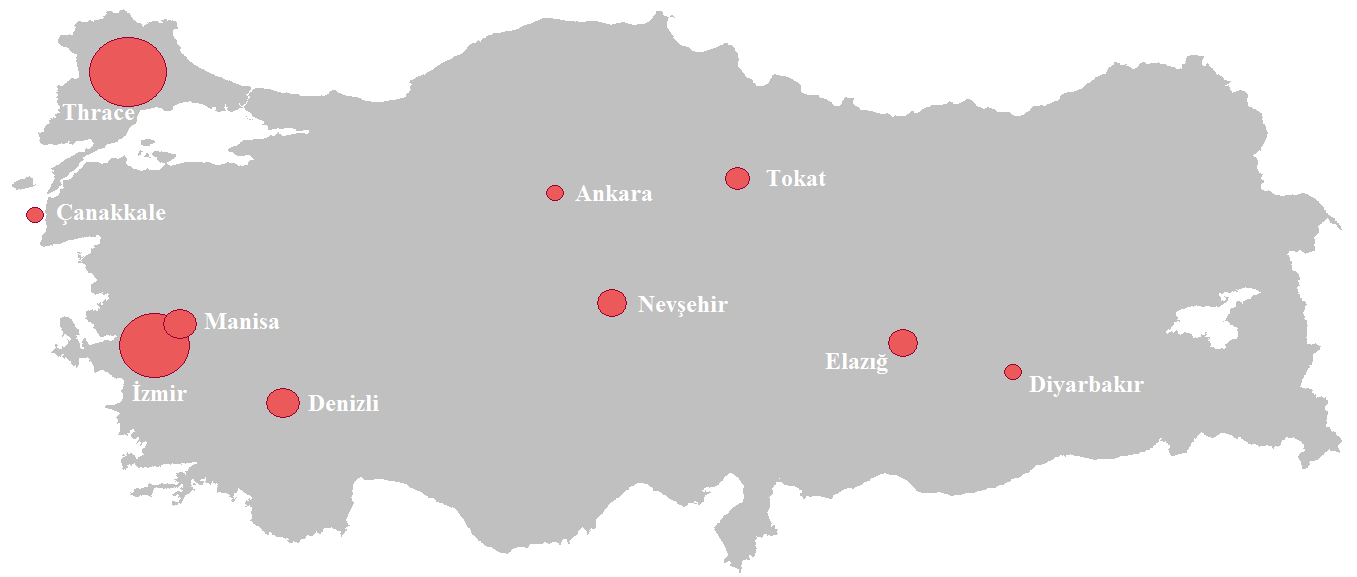
Wine-producing regions of Turkey

Wine production regions of Turkey and the cumulative temperature above the vine's zero growth threshold (10 °C) between April and September.

Turkish wine is wine produced in Turkey. Grape growing in Anatolia has a long history; archaeological and archaeobotanical findings place the region, together with the Caucasus, among the areas where Vitis vinifera was first domesticated, with evidence dating back at least 7,000 years.

Estimates of the number of indigenous Vitis vinifera varieties in Turkey range widely, from around 600 to over 1,200, but fewer than 60 are grown commercially. The country has about 410,000 to 505,000 hectares (1,010,000 to 1,250,000 acres) under vine, the fifth-largest vineyard area worldwide. Only a small share of the harvest is used for wine; estimates vary between 3% and 15%. The remainder is sold as table grapes, dried into raisins, or distilled into rakı.

The sector has changed considerably since the 1990s. The state monopoly Tekel was broken up and its wine division sold off in 2004, and a number of new private wineries opened, many of them small estates. Producers have also returned to working with several indigenous grape varieties that had been little used commercially during the 20th century.

== History ==
=== Antiquity ===
Evidence for early viticulture in Anatolia comes from sites in the southeast (Upper Mesopotamia), where domesticated grapes have been dated to between roughly 9500 and 5000 BCE. Wine appears in Hittite legal texts of the second millennium BCE: damaging a vineyard carried fines, and ritual texts describe libations of wine to the gods. Under the Phrygians, Anatolian wine was traded across the Mediterranean, with shipments reaching Marseille in the 6th century BCE. The Aegean coast — Lydia, Ionia and the islands offshore — was associated with the cult of Dionysus, and Homer mentions wines from the region.

=== Ottoman period ===
Under the Ottoman Empire, commercial wine production was carried out almost entirely by non-Muslim subjects: Rûm (Greek Orthodox), Armenians, Syriacs and Jews. Vineyards persisted in Thrace, on the Aegean coast and in inland regions such as Cappadocia. Smyrna (modern İzmir) was a particularly active export port for wine and other vine products during the 17th century.

=== Early Republic ===
After the founding of the Republic in 1923, the new government promoted commercial winemaking. Mustafa Kemal Atatürk ordered the establishment of a state winery at Tekirdağ in 1925. For much of the 20th century Tekel, the state alcohol and tobacco monopoly, dominated the trade. Two of today's largest private firms, Doluca (founded 1926) and Kavaklıdere (founded 1929), date from this period.

=== Post-1990 developments ===
The privatisation of Tekel's alcoholic-drinks division, completed in 2004, removed the state's role in production. New private wineries appeared during the 1990s and 2000s. Many were small, family-run estates, and several worked with foreign consultants. A number of producers began replanting native grapes such as Kalecik Karası, Narince and Urla Karası that had been little used since the early 20th century. Turkish wines have collected over a thousand medals in international competitions since the mid-2000s, according to industry sources.

== Wine regions ==
Commercial viticulture is concentrated in four broad areas: Thrace and the Marmara coast, the Aegean, Central Anatolia, and Eastern–Southeastern Anatolia. A small number of wineries also operate in the Mediterranean and Black Sea regions.

=== Thrace and Marmara ===
The northwest produces somewhere between 30% and 40% of Turkey's wine. The climate is maritime, moderated by the Aegean Sea, the Sea of Marmara and the Black Sea. Production is centred on Kırklareli, Tekirdağ, Şarköy and the Gelibolu peninsula. Cabernet Sauvignon and Merlot are widely planted alongside the indigenous red Papazkarası; Yapıncak, a local white grape, survives mainly around Şarköy.

=== Aegean ===
The Aegean is the largest wine-producing region by volume, with around a third of national output. Its climate is Mediterranean: hot, dry summers and mild winters.

Coastal vineyards are found around Urla, Çeşme and on the island of Bozcaada (ancient Tenedos). Bozcaada has long been planted with the local varieties Karalahna and Çavuş. The Urla peninsula has seen new plantings since the 2000s, including the previously near-extinct Urla Karası and the white Bornova Misketi.

The inland Aegean, around Denizli (especially Çal) and Manisa, sits on higher plateaus. Most of the country's Sultaniye crop, used for raisins as well as some light white wine, comes from here. The red Çalkarası, used mainly for rosé, takes its name from Çal.

=== Central Anatolia ===
Vineyards in Cappadocia and the area around Ankara grow at altitudes between roughly 800 and 1,200 metres in a continental climate. Cappadocia, with its volcanic tuff soils, is the home of Emir, a white grape used both for still wine and for traditional-method sparkling. Winter frost is a recurring problem; some growers bury vines for protection. The microclimate around the Kızılırmak near the town of Kalecik gives its name to Kalecik Karası.

=== Eastern and Southeastern Anatolia ===
The harsher climate of the east limits the range of varieties but suits certain late-ripening reds. Elazığ and Malatya, in the Euphrates valley, are the heartland of Öküzgözü. Diyarbakır and the surrounding plain are associated with Boğazkere, a tannic red. In Mardin, a smaller Syriac community has maintained an older tradition using local grapes such as Mazrona.

=== Other areas ===
There are scattered vineyards in the Taurus Mountains of the Mediterranean region, particularly around Elmalı in Antalya province, where the red grape Acıkara has been replanted by a small number of producers. In the Black Sea region, the province of Tokat grows Narince on the climatic boundary between the wet coast and the dry interior.

== Grape varieties ==
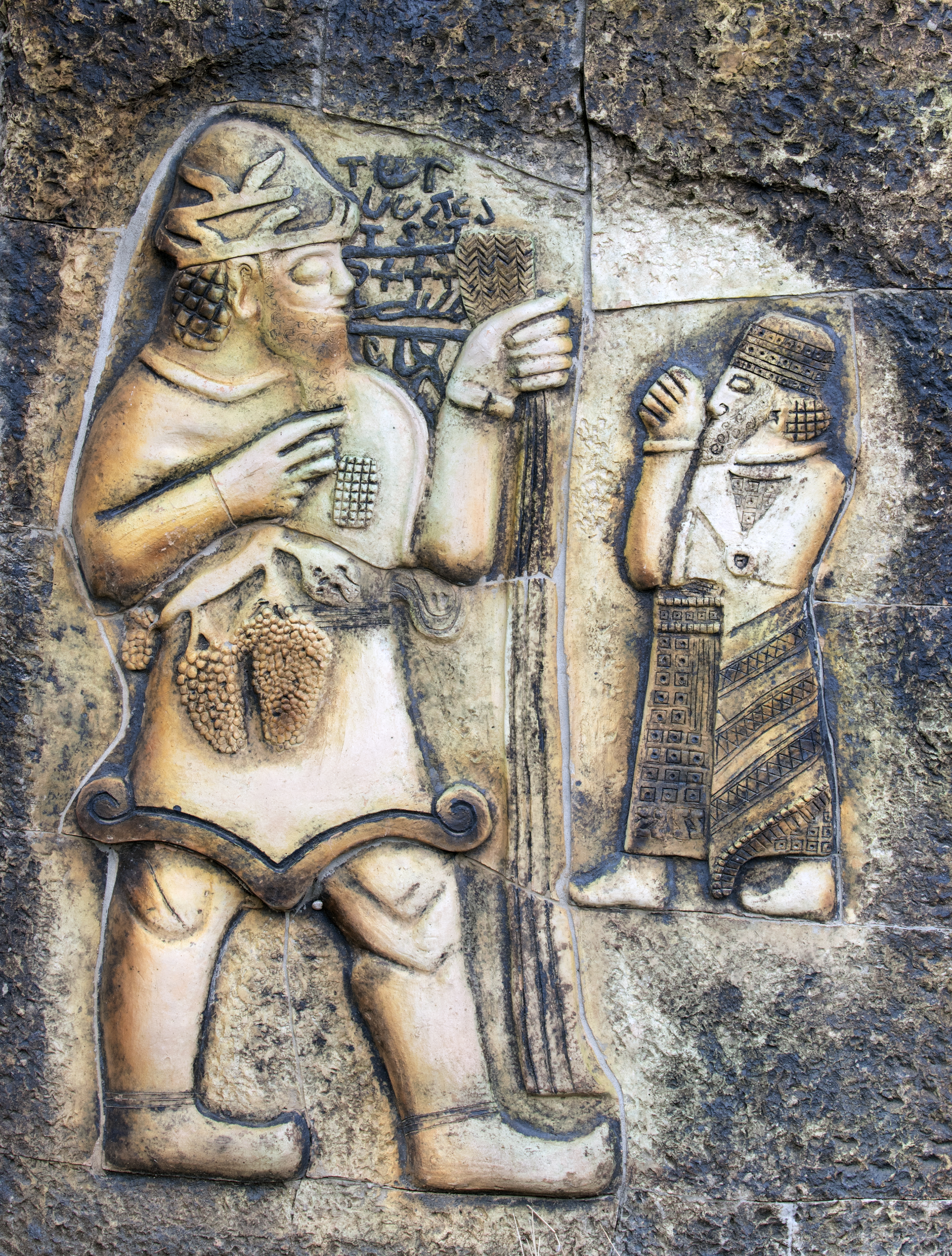
Late Hittite relief at İvriz showing King Warpalawas of Tuwana facing the storm god Tarḫunna, who holds wheat in one hand and grapes in the other.

Of the indigenous grapes recorded in Turkey, only around 60 are vinified commercially. Producers also work with international varieties, often blending the two: a common pairing is Cabernet Sauvignon with Boğazkere.

=== Indigenous varieties ===
Selected indigenous grape varieties of Turkey
Variety	Colour	Main growing area	Notes
Boğazkere	Red	Diyarbakır, southeast Anatolia	Name means "throat burner". Tannic, deeply coloured. Commonly blended with Öküzgözü.
Öküzgözü	Red	Elazığ, eastern Anatolia	Name means "ox eye", a reference to the large berries. Bright acidity, red fruit, softer tannins than Boğazkere.
Kalecik Karası	Red	Kalecik, near Ankara	Light- to medium-bodied; sometimes compared in style to Pinot noir. Aromatic, with red berry and floral notes.
Narince	White	Tokat	Name means "delicately". Takes oak well; producers make both unoaked and barrel-aged styles.
Emir	White	Cappadocia	High acidity, mineral character. Used for still and sparkling wines.
Sultaniye	White	Manisa, Denizli	A multipurpose grape: table grape, raisin, and base for light white wines.
Bornova Misketi	White	İzmir (Bornova)	A clone of Muscat. Produced dry, off-dry, and as a fortified sweet wine.
Papazkarası	Red	Thrace	Name means "priest's black". Aromatic, with red plum and pepper notes.
Çalkarası	Red	Denizli (Çal)	Used mainly for rosé.
Urla Karası	Red	Urla, Aegean coast	A near-extinct variety propagated again from the 2000s onward.
Karasakız (Kuntra)	Red	Bozcaada, Thrace	Light reds and rosés.
Vasilaki	White	Bozcaada	Early-ripening; mostly bottled as a single-variety dry white on the island.
Acıkara	Red	Antalya province	Name means "bitter black". Replanted from the 2010s onward by a small number of growers.

=== International varieties ===
Cabernet Sauvignon, Merlot, Syrah, Grenache and Cabernet Franc are the main red imports; Chardonnay, Sauvignon blanc and Viognier dominate among whites. Bordeaux-style red blends are common, as are mixed bottlings that combine an international variety with a native one.

=== Styles ===
Reds range from light, perfumed wines (Kalecik Karası) to dense, tannic bottlings designed for ageing (Boğazkere). The Öküzgözü–Boğazkere blend, sold for many years under the brand name Buzbağ, is sometimes treated as the prototypical Turkish red. White wines include crisp, mineral examples from Cappadocia (Emir), aromatic Muscats from the Aegean (Bornova Misketi), and barrel-fermented bottlings from Narince and Chardonnay. Rosé is made principally from Çalkarası and Kalecik Karası, usually in a dry, pale style. Sparkling wine is produced in smaller quantities, mostly by the traditional method using Emir or Kalecik Karası. Late-harvest and fortified wines exist but are rare commercially.

== Producers ==
There were approximately 140 licensed wineries in Turkey in the mid-2020s.

Among older firms, Kayra (formed from the privatised wine division of Tekel) operates wineries at Şarköy in Thrace and at Elazığ, and produces the Buzbağ label. Kavaklıdere, founded in Ankara in 1929, is the largest private producer and owns vineyards in several regions. Doluca, established in Thrace in 1926, was for many years the main importer of international grape varieties; its Sarafin range was the first Turkish wine marketed under a single-vineyard label. Sevilen (İzmir, 1942) and Diren (Tokat, 1958) date from the same period.

Newer producers include Arcadia, Barbare, Chamlija and Şato Kalpak in Thrace; Urla Winery, Paşaeli and Corvus (the latter based on Bozcaada) on the Aegean coast; Turasan and Kocabağ in Cappadocia; and Vinkara at Kalecik, which specialises in sparkling Kalecik Karası. Likya, in Antalya province, works with the rarer Mediterranean varieties including Acıkara.

== Wine tourism ==
The Turkish Ministry of Culture and Tourism has marked out signed "Vineyard Routes" linking groups of wineries. The Thrace route, covering Kırklareli, Tekirdağ and Gelibolu, is the most visited because of its proximity to Istanbul. The Urla route, west of İzmir, links a cluster of smaller wineries on the peninsula. Additional designated routes include the Inner Aegean route, the Çal route, and the Lydia ancient route. The newest addition is the Troia wine route, which connects wineries from Gelibolu to Bozcaada around the historical region of Troia.

In Cappadocia some wineries offer tastings in cellars cut into the soft tuff. Bozcaada hosts an annual grape harvest festival in early September. Bozcaada hosts an annual grape harvest festival in early September.

== Consumption ==
Per capita wine consumption is low, at under one litre per adult per year. Rakı and beer have historically been more popular, and Islamic prohibitions on alcohol mean that a substantial share of the adult population does not drink at all. Most wine is consumed in the larger cities and in coastal tourist areas.

Wine is sometimes paired with regional dishes. Tannic reds such as Boğazkere are typically drunk with grilled meats and tandır; Öküzgözü is often served with tomato-based stews and aubergine dishes such as Hünkarbeğendi. Whites including Narince and Emir are usually paired with meze and grilled fish, particularly Levrek (sea bass) and Lüfer (bluefish).

== Regulation ==
Domestic wine production is constrained by several laws. A 2013 amendment to the Law on the Regulation of Tobacco and Alcohol Products banned advertising of alcoholic drinks and restricted what producers can show on labels and websites. Wine is also subject to a Special Consumption Tax (Özel Tüketim Vergisi, ÖTV) and to value-added tax, which together account for a large share of the retail price. Exports have grown more slowly than producers had hoped, and many wineries rely on direct sales at the cellar door, particularly to tourists.

== See also ==
- Alcohol laws of Turkey
- Agriculture in Turkey
- Turkish cuisine
- Rakı
