= Adakarası =

Indigenous Turkish red grape variety

- Grape (Vitis)
- Color of berry skin: Red
- Species: Vitis vinifera
- Also called: Adakara
- Origin: Turkey
- Notable regions: Avşa Island (Balıkesir), Marmara Region
- Notable wines: Avşa Adakarası Şarabı

Adakarası (“island’s black”) is an indigenous Turkish red grape variety closely associated with Avşa Island in the Sea of Marmara. The grape is also known as Adakara and is cultivated mainly in the Marmara Region.

== Geographical indication ==
The grape Adakarası received a geographical indication registration (menşe adı) from the Turkish Patent and Trademark Office (TÜRKPATENT) with registration number 1323, dated 24 January 2023.

In 2025, the wine Avşa Adakarası Şarabı received a geographical indication registration as a mahreç işareti (registration number 1735, dated 7 May 2025). The registration specifies that the wine is produced from the geographically indicated Avşa Adakarası grape and that production stages take place within the defined geographical area on Avşa Island.

Some sources described the registration of Avşa Adakarası Şarabı as the first geographical indication registration granted to a wine in Turkey.

== Viticulture and wine ==
Academic analysis of wines produced on Avşa Island has examined Adakarası grapes and resulting wines through physical and chemical measurements, including acidity and alcohol ranges across different producers and wine styles.

The official geographical indication specification for Avşa Adakarası Şarabı describes typical chemical parameters (including alcohol and total acidity ranges) and links the wine’s style to the grape variety and Avşa Island’s local growing conditions.

== See also ==
- Boğazkere
- Çalkarası
- Kalecik Karası
- Papazkarası
- Öküzgözü
