= Karasakız =

Turkish wine grape variety

- Grape (Vitis)
- Color of berry skin: Noir
- Species: Vitis vinifera
- Also called: Kuntra, Mavro Kuntra, Sakız Kara
- Origin: Turkey
- Notable regions: Bozcaada, Thrace, Gelibolu Peninsula
- VIVC number: 10486

Karasakız is a native Turkish red wine grape variety grown primarily in Bozcaada (Tenedos) and the northern Aegean Region, including the Gelibolu Peninsula. In Bozcaada, it is known almost exclusively as Kuntra.

Historically, Karasakız was the primary grape used for brandy and cognac production by the state-owned Tekel Spirit Factory until the factory's privatization. In recent years, it has seen a revival, with producers creating varietal wines, rosés, and sparkling wines.

== Viticulture ==
Karasakız is a vigorous variety, noted for its resistance to fungal diseases and heat.

- Berries: The berries are large, round, and thin-skinned with a dark purple-blue color.
- Ripening: It is a late-ripening variety (geç olgunlaşan), typically harvested in September.
- Terroir: While grown widely across Thrace, high-quality grapes are reportedly sourced from old bush vines in the Bayramiç district near the foothills of Kaz Dağları.

== Winemaking and styles ==
The grape is versatile and used to produce several styles of wine:

- Red Varietals: Karasakız reds are typically light-to-medium bodied with low tannins and medium acidity. They are often compared to Gamay or Pinot Noir due to their bright fruit profile.
- Rosé and Sparkling: Due to its fruit-forward nature and acidity retention, it is used for "blush" wines and traditional method sparkling wines.
- Blends: It is blended to add soft fruitiness to more tannic varieties like Karalahna or Petit Verdot.

== Sensory profile ==
Wines made from Karasakız are aromatic and fruit-driven.

- Aromas: The nose is characterized by red forest fruits, strawberry jam, and a distinctive note of cotton candy (pamuk şeker).
- Palate: It typically presents a soft mouthfeel with low tannins, suitable for consumption while young.

== Food pairing ==
The variety's high acidity and low tannin structure make it food-friendly. It pairs well with spicy or non-spicy meat dishes and traditional clay pot casseroles (güveç).

== See also ==
- Turkish wine
- Karalahna
- Papazkarası
- Kalecik Karası
- Öküzgözü
- Boğazkere
