= Dayılar =

Dayılar (literally "maternal uncles" in Turkish) may refer to:

- Dayılar, Aladağ, a village in the district of Aladağ, Adana Province, Turkey
- Dayılar, Beşiri, a village in the district of Beşiri, Batman Province, Turkey
- Dayılar, Çal
- Dayılar, Hizan, a village
