= Çalkuyucak, Çal =

Village in Turkey

Çalkuyucak
- Neighbourhood
- Location in Turkey Çalkuyucak (Turkey Aegean)
- Coordinates: 38°11′N 29°22′E
- Country: Turkey
- Province: Denizli
- District: Çal
- Population (2022): 189
- Time zone: UTC+3 (TRT)

Çalkuyucak is a neighbourhood in the municipality and district of Çal, Denizli Province in Turkey. Its population is 189 (2022). It has an elevation of 792 m (2,598 ft). The village is located close to Bahadırlar and Çoğaşli.
