= Kocaköy (disambiguation) =

Kocaköy can refer to:

- Kocaköy
- Kocaköy, Ayvacık
- Kocaköy, Çal
