= Gelinören =

Gelinören can refer to:

- Gelinören, Çal
- Gelinören, Kastamonu
