= Narince (grape) =

Indigenous Turkish white grape variety

- Grape (Vitis)
- Color of berry skin: White
- Species: Vitis vinifera
- Origin: Turkey
- Notable regions: Tokat Province
- Notable wines: Varietal white wines; oak-aged styles

Narince is an indigenous Turkish white wine grape variety originating from Tokat Province in north-central Turkey. It is one of the country’s most important and widely planted native white grape varieties and is especially associated with the Yeşilırmak basin. Narince is primarily used in the production of dry white wines, though it is also valued for its suitability for oak aging and extended maturation.

== History and origins ==
Narince has been cultivated in the Tokat region for centuries and is regarded as a traditional Anatolian grape variety. The name Narince translates to “delicate” or “gentle” in Turkish, a reference to both the grape’s thin skin and the refined style of wines produced from it.

Ampelographic and genetic studies indicate that Narince is the result of a natural cross between Kalecik Karası and Dimrit, two indigenous Anatolian grape varieties, confirming its local origin.

== Viticulture ==
Narince is a mid- to late-ripening variety, with a ripening period comparable to that of Merlot. Harvest typically takes place in mid-September under Tokat conditions. The grape adapts well to continental climates with warm days and cool nights and is known for maintaining acidity while achieving full phenolic ripeness.

The berries develop a yellow-green color that can take on amber hues at full maturity. Narince is valued by growers for its balanced sugar accumulation and relatively stable acidity, characteristics that allow flexibility in winemaking styles.

== Wine styles and characteristics ==
Narince is most commonly vinified as a dry white wine. Wines typically display a yellow-green color and aromatic profiles that include floral notes and yellow and white fruits such as lime, orange, white pineapple, plum, green apple, and citrus. The palate is generally medium to full-bodied, with balanced acidity and a rounded mouthfeel.

In cooler growing areas or earlier harvests, Narince wines tend to show higher acidity and fresher citrus-driven profiles. The grape is also well suited to oak aging, and both neutral and new oak barrels are commonly used to add texture and complexity. Oak-aged Narince wines can develop notes of vanilla, spice, and dried fruit and are considered capable of short- to medium-term aging.

== Role in Turkish wine ==
Narince occupies a central position among indigenous Turkish white grapes and is often cited as the country’s most versatile native white variety. It is produced by many leading Turkish wineries and is used both for varietal bottlings and experimental styles, including extended lees contact and barrel fermentation.

== See also ==
- Emir (grape)
- Kalecik Karası
- Öküzgözü
- Boğazkere
