= Yukarıseyit, Çal =

Village in Turkey

Yukarıseyit
- Neighbourhood
- Location in Turkey Yukarıseyit (Turkey Aegean)
- Coordinates: 38°03′N 29°25′E
- Country: Turkey
- Province: Denizli
- District: Çal
- Population (2022): 467
- Time zone: UTC+3 (TRT)

Yukarıseyit is a neighbourhood in the municipality and district of Çal, Denizli Province in Turkey. Its population is 467 (2022).
