= Hançalar, Çal =

Village in Turkey

Hançalar
- Neighbourhood
- Location in Turkey Hançalar (Turkey Aegean)
- Coordinates: 38°07′23″N 29°23′35″E
- Country: Turkey
- Province: Denizli
- District: Çal
- Population (2022): 1,073
- Time zone: UTC+3 (TRT)

Hançalar is a neighbourhood of the municipality and district of Çal, Denizli Province, Turkey. Its population is 1,073 (2022). Before the 2013 reorganisation, it was a town (belde).
