= Selcen, Çal =

Village in Denizli, Turkey

Selcen
- Neighbourhood
- Location in Turkey Selcen (Turkey Aegean)
- Coordinates: 38°06′N 29°23′E
- Country: Turkey
- Province: Denizli
- District: Çal
- Population (2022): 618
- Time zone: UTC+3 (TRT)

Selcen is a neighbourhood of the municipality and district of Çal, Denizli Province, Turkey. Its population is 618 (2022). Before the 2013 reorganisation, it was considered a town (belde).
