= Peynirciler, Çal =

Village in Turkey

Peynirciler
- Neighbourhood
- Location in Turkey Peynirciler (Turkey Aegean)
- Coordinates: 38.009167°N 29.297778°E
- Country: Turkey
- Province: Denizli
- District: Çal
- Population (2022): 63
- Time zone: UTC+3 (TRT)

Peynirciler (also: Peynirci) is a neighbourhood in the municipality and district of Çal, Denizli Province in Turkey. Its population is 63 (2022).
