= Hasan Ali Toptaş =

Turkish author (born 1958)

- Born: 15 October 1958 (age 67) Çal, Turkey
- Occupation: Novelist, short story writer
- Period: 1987–present
- Genre: Modernism, postmodernism

Hasan Ali Toptaş (born 15 October 1958) is a prominent Turkish novelist and short story writer. His first short story book Bir Gülüşün Kimliği (The Identity of A Laugh) was published in 1987. An important Turkish scholar, Yıldız Ecevit nicknames him "a postmodern modernist" and calls him "a Kafka in Turkish literature", in her work Türk Romanında Postmodernist Açılımlar (The Postmodernist Expansion in Turkish Literature).

== Allegations of sexual misconduct ==
On 8 December 2020, Toptaş was accused of sexual misconduct by a number of users on Twitter. On TRT 2's program Karalama Defteri, which was presented by Doğan Hızlan, Toptaş's opinion of translators were shared and criticized by some scholars. In episode 37 of the program which was broadcast in November 2019, Toptaş faced criticism after making a connection between the age of translators and their choice of words. A part of this episode was later shared on Twitter in 2020, to which a woman replied, "How many people are eagerly waiting for this man to be exposed? I and many of my friends have unpleasant memories of him from our university years. If I had the current consciousness and courage I would definitely speak up. The classic middle-aged man of letters. Really a disappointment." After this comment nearly 20 women shared their experiences of harassment by Toptaş.

Writer Pelin Buzluk was among those who stated that they experienced harassment at the hands of Toptaş and described the incident as 'sexual assault'. Inspired by the Me Too movement, many women later expressed solidarity with the victims. Toptaş accepted the accusations and wrote, "Until a person understands what [the definition of] a male offender is, he can make mistakes without knowing, realizing or thinking about what great wounds he could inflict on the other side. Today we learn from women what being a doer is. I sincerely apologize to all the people I hurt, upset and harmed with my unwitting behavior." After the events, the website 5harfliler.com and many users made a call to Everest Publications, the publishers of Toptaş's works, to end their collaboration with him. Saadet Özen, the editor-in-chief of Everest, responded to the call on Twitter and said, "the statement of a woman is essential for the victim's voice to be heard, the harassment and pressure to be revealed, to be discussed and questioned". She added that they would act accordingly and terminate their works with Toptaş. The publication house further stated "We are against all kinds of harassment and will continue to be." The Turkish Writers' Union also called on literati to take a collective attitude against all kinds of harassment using social and literary status. His Mersin City Literature Award was revoked after the harassment cases came forward, with the city council deeming it necessary "due to our humanitarian, moral, conscientious, and literary responsibility." Director Ali Aydın and producer Müge Büyüktalaş announced that the project for adapting Toptaş's novel Kuşlar Yasına Gider into a movie had been cancelled. The project had been in development since 2019.

== Works ==
- Bir Gülüşün Kimliği [The Identity of A Laugh] - 1987
- Yalnızlıklar [Solitudes] - 1990
- Ölü Zaman Gezginleri [The Dead Time Travelers] - 1993
- Sonsuzluğa Nokta [Full Stop to Infinity] - 1993
- Gölgesizler [Shadowless] - 1995
- Kayıp Hayaller Kitabı [The Book of Lost Dreams] - 1996
- Ben Bir Gürgen Dalıyım [I am a Hornbeam Branch] - 1997
- Bin Hüzünlü Haz [A-Thousand-Gloomy Pleasure] - 1999
- Uykuların Doğusu [The East of Slumbers] - 2005
- Harfler ve Notalar [Letters and Notes] - 2007
- Heba [Reckless] - 2013
- Kuşlar Yasına Gider [Birds Go to His Mourning] - 2016
- Beni Kör Kuyularda - 2019
- Heba - Midi Boy - 2019
- Gecenin Gecesi - Ciltli - 2020

== Works in English ==
- Reckless - 2016
- Shadowless - 2017
