= Akkent =

- Neighbourhood
- Location in Turkey Akkent (Turkey Aegean)
- Coordinates: 38°09′N 29°23′E
- Country: Turkey
- Province: Denizli
- District: Çal
- Elevation: 850 m (2,790 ft)
- Population (2022): 1,859
- Time zone: UTC+3 (TRT)
- Postal code: 20710
- Area code: 0258

Akkent (formerly: Zeyve) is a neighbourhood of the municipality and district of Çal, Denizli Province, Turkey. Its population is 1,859 (2022). Before the 2013 reorganisation, it was a town (belde). It is situated to the west of Büyükmenderes River (ancient Meander). The distance to Çal is 10 kilometres (6.2 mi) and to Denizli is 72 kilometres (45 mi). The settlement was probably founded during the Germiyan Beylik era in 13th century. In 1932 the settlement was declared a seat of township. Orcharding is the major economic sector of the town. There is also a factory based on agricultural products.
