= Alfaklar, Çal =

Village in Turkey

Alfaklar
- Neighbourhood
- Location in Turkey Alfaklar (Turkey Aegean)
- Coordinates: 38.1150°N 29.3930°E
- Country: Turkey
- Province: Denizli
- District: Çal
- Population (2022): 157
- Time zone: UTC+3 (TRT)

Alfaklar is a neighbourhood in the municipality and district of Çal, Denizli Province in Turkey. Its population is 157 (2022).
