= Kaplanlar, Çal =

Village in Turkey

Kaplanlar
- Neighbourhood
- Location in Turkey Kaplanlar (Turkey Aegean)
- Coordinates: 38°03′02″N 29°19′00″E
- Country: Turkey
- Province: Denizli
- District: Çal
- Population (2022): 118
- Time zone: UTC+3 (TRT)

Kaplanlar is a neighbourhood in the municipality and district of Çal, Denizli Province in Turkey. Its population is 118 (2022).
