= Sazak, Çal =

Village in Turkey

Sazak
- Neighbourhood
- Location in Turkey Sazak (Turkey Aegean)
- Coordinates: 38.088889°N 29.291389°E
- Country: Turkey
- Province: Denizli
- District: Çal
- Population (2022): 539
- Time zone: UTC+3 (TRT)

Sazak is a neighbourhood in the municipality and district of Çal, Denizli Province in Turkey. Its population is 539 (2022).
