= İsabey, Çal =

Village in Turkey

İsabey
- Neighbourhood
- Location in Turkey İsabey (Turkey Aegean)
- Coordinates: 38.007603°N 29.436335°E
- Country: Turkey
- Province: Denizli
- District: Çal
- Population (2022): 916
- Time zone: UTC+3 (TRT)

İsabey is a neighbourhood of the municipality and district of Çal, Denizli Province, Turkey. Its population is 916 (2022). Before the 2013 reorganisation, it was a town (belde).
