= Kabalar, Çal =

Village in Turkey

Kabalar
- Neighbourhood
- Location in Turkey Kabalar (Turkey Aegean)
- Coordinates: 38.116667°N 29.283333°E
- Country: Turkey
- Province: Denizli
- District: Çal
- Population (2022): 556
- Time zone: UTC+3 (TRT)

Kabalar is a neighbourhood in the municipality and district of Çal, Denizli Province in Turkey. Its population is 556 (2022).
