= Karapınar =

- District and municipality
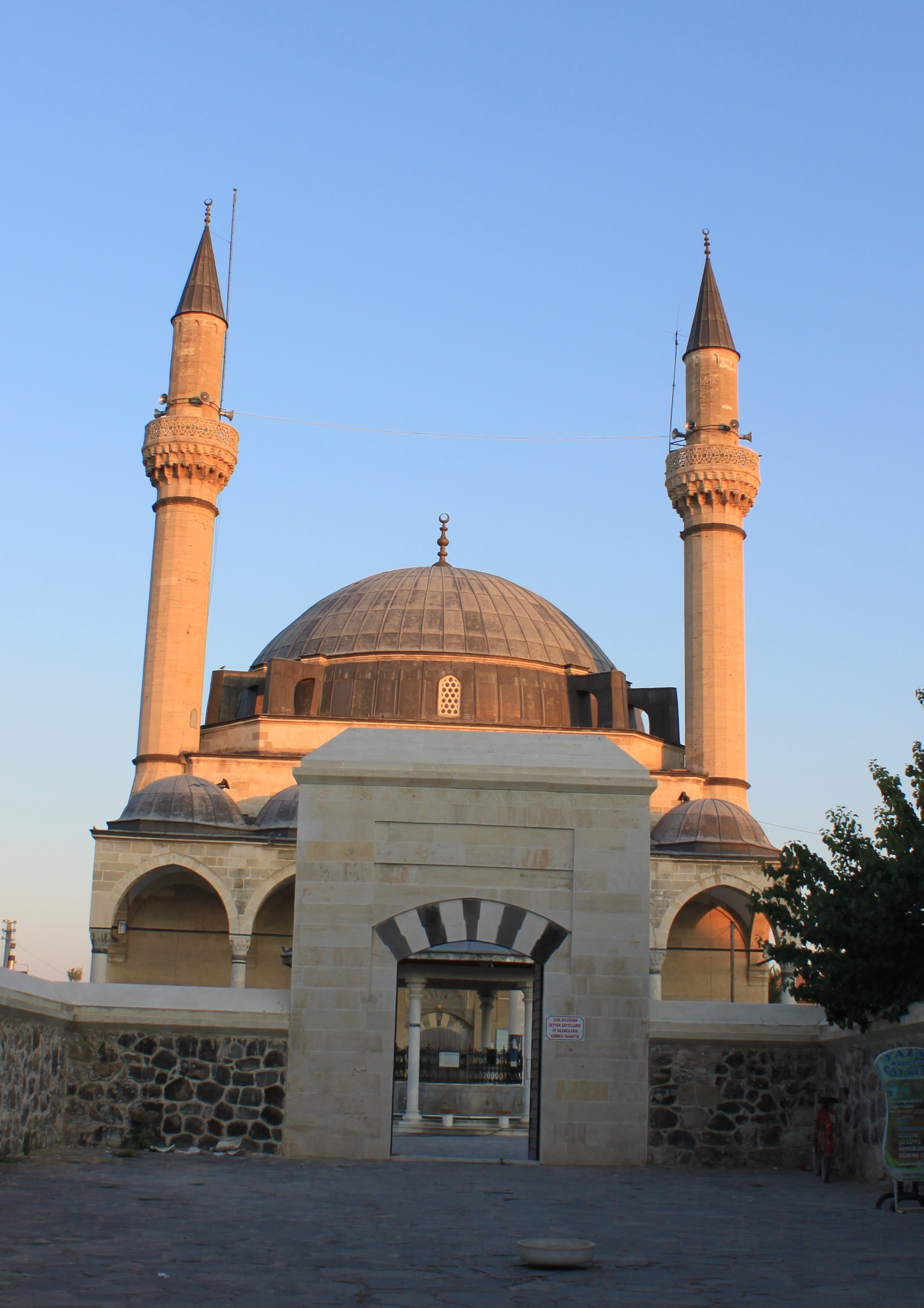
- Selimiye Külliyesi; Sultan Selim Mosque of 1563

- Logo

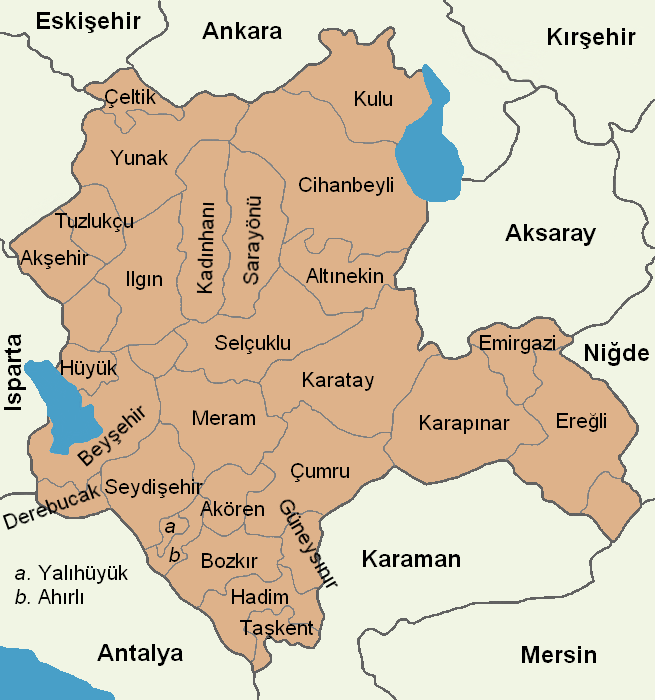
- Map showing Karapınar District in Konya Province

- Location within Turkey Location within Turkey Central Anatolia
- Coordinates: 37°42′53″N 33°33′03″E
- Country: Turkey
- Province: Konya

Government
  - Mayor: İbrahim Önal (AKP)
- Area: 2,623 km^{2} (1,013 sq mi)
- Elevation: 987 m (3,238 ft)
- Population (2022): 50,323
  - Density: 19.19/km^{2} (49.69/sq mi)
- Time zone: UTC+3 (TRT)
- Postal code: 42400
- Area code: 0332
- Website: www.karapinar.bel.tr

Karapınar, formerly known as Barta, is a municipality and district of Konya Province, Turkey. It has an area of 2,623 square kilometres (1,013 mi^{2}) and its population is 50,323 (2022). The volcanic Karapınar Field is located nearby.

== Composition ==
There are 42 neighbourhoods in Karapınar District:

- Adalet
- Akçayazı
- Akören
- Alaaddin
- Apak
- Çetmi
- Çiğil
- Cumhuriyet
- Fatih
- Fevzipaşa
- Gaziosmanpaşa
- Hacı İsa
- Hacı Ömerli
- Hankapı
- Hasanoba
- Hotamış
- İpekçi
- İslik
- İsmetpaşa
- Kale
- Karakışla
- Kayacık
- Kayalı
- Kazanhüyüğü
- Kesmez
- Küçükaşlama
- Küllü
- Ortaoba
- Oymalı
- Pınarbaşı
- Reşadiye
- Sandıklı
- Sazlıpınar
- Selimiye
- Türüdiye
- Ulus
- Yağmapınar
- Yeni
- Yenikuyu
- Yeşilyurt
- Yunus Emre
- Zafer

== Climate ==
Karapınar has a cold semi-arid climate (Köppen: BSk), with cold winters and hot, dry summers.

Climate data for Karapınar (1991–2020)
Month	Jan	Feb	Mar	Apr	May	Jun	Jul	Aug	Sep	Oct	Nov	Dec	Year
Mean daily maximum °C (°F)	5.2 (41.4)	7.6 (45.7)	13.2 (55.8)	18.5 (65.3)	23.8 (74.8)	28.2 (82.8)	31.6 (88.9)	31.6 (88.9)	27.4 (81.3)	21.1 (70.0)	13.1 (55.6)	7.1 (44.8)	19.1 (66.4)
Daily mean °C (°F)	−0.2 (31.6)	1.3 (34.3)	6.0 (42.8)	10.9 (51.6)	15.8 (60.4)	20.1 (68.2)	23.3 (73.9)	23.0 (73.4)	18.3 (64.9)	12.6 (54.7)	5.6 (42.1)	1.5 (34.7)	11.6 (52.9)
Mean daily minimum °C (°F)	−4.9 (23.2)	−4.3 (24.3)	−0.7 (30.7)	3.3 (37.9)	7.6 (45.7)	11.5 (52.7)	14.1 (57.4)	13.8 (56.8)	9.1 (48.4)	4.5 (40.1)	−0.8 (30.6)	−3.1 (26.4)	4.2 (39.6)
Average precipitation mm (inches)	34.06 (1.34)	25.42 (1.00)	29.6 (1.17)	29.6 (1.17)	30.02 (1.18)	27.4 (1.08)	6.76 (0.27)	5.43 (0.21)	9.85 (0.39)	20.98 (0.83)	27.29 (1.07)	43.7 (1.72)	290.11 (11.42)
Average precipitation days (≥ 1.0 mm)	5.7	5.1	5.0	5.4	5.2	4.2	2.1	1.6	2.4	3.6	3.7	6.7	50.7
Average relative humidity (%)	78.4	73.5	64.7	59.9	57.0	50.8	43.7	45.6	49.8	60.9	70.7	78.3	61.1
Source: NOAA

== See also ==
- Karapınar coal mine
- Karapınar Field
- Karapınar Renewable Energy Resource Area
