= Çalçakırlar, Çal =

Village in Turkey

Çalçakırlar
- Neighbourhood
- Location in Turkey Çalçakırlar (Turkey Aegean)
- Coordinates: 38.2097°N 29.3255°E
- Country: Turkey
- Province: Denizli
- District: Çal
- Population (2022): 227
- Time zone: UTC+3 (TRT)

Çalçakırlar is a neighbourhood in the municipality and district of Çal, Denizli Province in Turkey. Its population is 227 (2022).
