= Şapçılar, Çal =

Village in Turkey

Şapçılar
- Neighbourhood
- Location in Turkey Şapçılar (Turkey Aegean)
- Coordinates: 38°07′N 29°26′E
- Country: Turkey
- Province: Denizli
- District: Çal
- Population (2022): 88
- Time zone: UTC+3 (TRT)

Şapçılar is a neighbourhood in the municipality and district of Çal, Denizli Province in Turkey. Its population is 88 (2022).
