= Denizler, Çal =

Village in Turkey

Denizler
- Neighbourhood
- Location in Turkey Denizler (Turkey Aegean)
- Coordinates: 37.940833°N 29.474167°E
- Country: Turkey
- Province: Denizli
- District: Çal
- Population (2022): 404
- Time zone: UTC+3 (TRT)

Denizler is a neighbourhood of the municipality and district of Çal, Denizli Province, Turkey. Its population is 404 (2022). Before the 2013 reorganisation, it was a town (belde).
