= Develler, Çal =

Village in Turkey

Develler
- Neighbourhood
- Location in Turkey Develler (Turkey Aegean)
- Coordinates: 38.155°N 29.301944°E
- Country: Turkey
- Province: Denizli
- District: Çal
- Population (2022): 269
- Time zone: UTC+3 (TRT)

Develler is a neighbourhood in the municipality and district of Çal, Denizli Province in Turkey. Its population is 269 (2022).
