= Mahmutgazi, Çal =

Village in Turkey

Mahmutgazi
- Neighbourhood
- Location in Turkey Mahmutgazi (Turkey Aegean)
- Coordinates: 38°01′43″N 29°25′24″E
- Country: Turkey
- Province: Denizli
- District: Çal
- Population (2022): 273
- Time zone: UTC+3 (TRT)

Mahmutgazi is a neighbourhood in the municipality and district of Çal, Denizli Province in Turkey. Its population is 273 (2022).
