= Belevi, Çal =

Village in Turkey

Belevi
- Neighbourhood
- Location in Turkey Belevi (Turkey Aegean)
- Coordinates: 37.9157°N 29.4031°E
- Country: Turkey
- Province: Denizli
- District: Çal
- Population (2022): 423
- Time zone: UTC+3 (TRT)

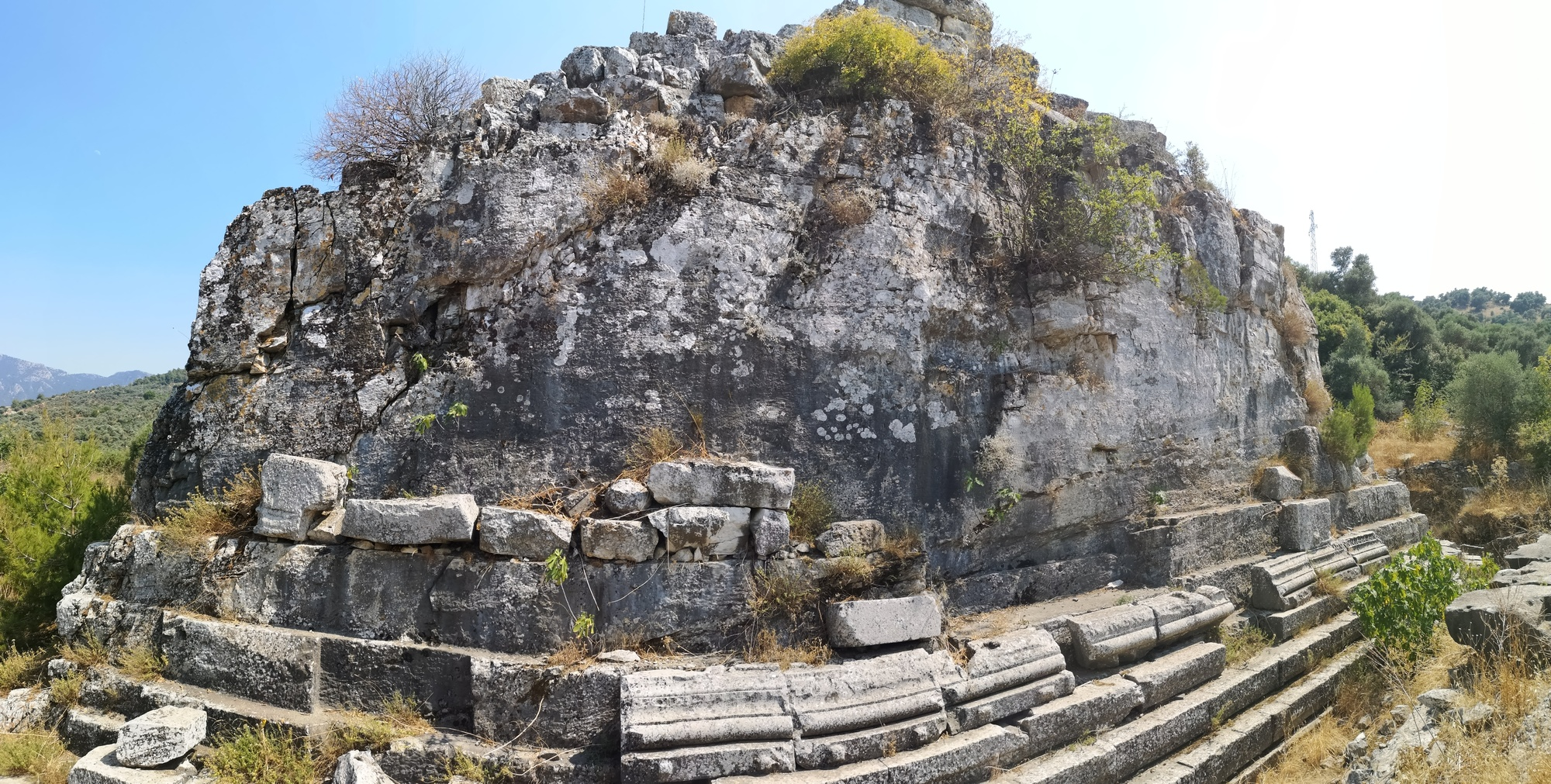
Belevi Mausoleum

Belevi is a neighbourhood in the municipality and district of Çal, Denizli Province, Turkey. Its population is 423 (as of 2022). Before the 2013 reorganisation, it was classified as a town (belde).
