= Karakaya, Çal =

Village in Turkey

Karakaya
- Neighbourhood
- Location in Turkey Karakaya (Turkey Aegean)
- Coordinates: 38.029167°N 29.2975°E
- Country: Turkey
- Province: Denizli
- District: Çal
- Population (2022): 105
- Time zone: UTC+3 (TRT)

Karakaya is a neighbourhood in the municipality and district of Çal, Denizli Province in Turkey. Its population is 105 (2022).
