= Yazır, Çal =

Village in Turkey

Yazır
- Neighbourhood
- Location in Turkey Yazır (Turkey Aegean)
- Coordinates: 37.9981°N 29.4247°E
- Country: Turkey
- Province: Denizli
- District: Çal
- Population (2022): 101
- Time zone: UTC+3 (TRT)

Yazır is a neighbourhood in the municipality and district of Çal, Denizli Province in Turkey. Its population is 101 (2022).
