= Baklançakırlar, Çal =

Village in Turkey

Baklançakırlar
- Neighbourhood
- Location in Turkey Baklançakırlar (Turkey Aegean)
- Coordinates: 37°57′N 29°19′E
- Country: Turkey
- Province: Denizli
- District: Çal
- Population (2022): 221
- Time zone: UTC+3 (TRT)

Baklançakırlar is a neighbourhood in the municipality and district of Çal, Denizli Province in Turkey. Its population is 221 (2022).
