= Ortaköy, Çal =

Village in Turkey

Ortaköy
- Neighbourhood
- Location in Turkey Ortaköy (Turkey Aegean)
- Coordinates: 38.173306°N 29.301535°E
- Country: Turkey
- Province: Denizli
- District: Çal
- Population (2022): 537
- Time zone: UTC+3 (TRT)

Ortaköy is a neighbourhood of the municipality and district of Çal, Denizli Province, Turkey. Its population is 537 (2022). Before the 2013 reorganisation, it was a town (belde).
