= Aşağıseyit, Çal =

Village in Denzili, Turkey

Aşağıseyit
- Neighbourhood
- Location in Turkey Aşağıseyit (Turkey Aegean)
- Coordinates: 38°04′N 29°28′E
- Country: Turkey
- Province: Denizli
- District: Çal
- Population (2022): 291
- Time zone: UTC+3 (TRT)

Aşağıseyit is a neighbourhood in the municipality and district of Çal, Denizli Province in Turkey. Its population is 291 (2022).
