= Süller, Çal =

Village in Turkey

Süller
- Neighbourhood
- Location in Turkey Süller (Turkey Aegean)
- Coordinates: 38°09′31″N 29°28′39″E
- Country: Turkey
- Province: Denizli
- District: Çal
- Population (2022): 2,275
- Time zone: UTC+3 (TRT)

Süller is a neighbourhood of the municipality and district of Çal, Denizli Province, Turkey. Its population is 2,275 (2022). Before the 2013 reorganisation, it was a town (belde).
