= Bayıralan, Çal =

Village in Turkey

Bayıralan
- Neighbourhood
- Location in Turkey Bayıralan (Turkey Aegean)
- Coordinates: 37.9711°N 29.3709°E
- Country: Turkey
- Province: Denizli
- District: Çal
- Population (2022): 461
- Time zone: UTC+3 (TRT)

Bayıralan is a neighbourhood in the municipality and district of Çal, Denizli Province in Turkey. Its population is 461 (2022).
