= Sakızcılar, Çal =

Village in Turkey

Sakızcılar
- Neighbourhood
- Location in Turkey Sakızcılar (Turkey Aegean)
- Coordinates: 38.022222°N 29.265556°E
- Country: Turkey
- Province: Denizli
- District: Çal
- Population (2022): 163
- Time zone: UTC+3 (TRT)

Sakızcılar is a neighbourhood in the municipality and district of Çal, Denizli Province in Turkey. Its population is 163 (2022).
