= Yeşilırmak =

Yeşilırmak (literally "green river") is a Turkish place name that may refer to several things:

- Yeşilırmak (river), a river in northern Turkey
- Elif Jale Yeşilırmak (born 1986), Turkish female wrestler of Russian origin
- Limnitis, a village in Cyprus whose Turkish name is Yeşilırmak
