= Gelinören, Çal =

Village in Turkey

Gelinören
- Neighbourhood
- Location in Turkey Gelinören (Turkey Aegean)
- Coordinates: 38.093333°N 29.526944°E
- Country: Turkey
- Province: Denizli
- District: Çal
- Population (2022): 74
- Time zone: UTC+3 (TRT)

Gelinören is a neighbourhood in the municipality and district of Çal, Denizli Province in Turkey. Its population is 74 (2022).
