= Kocaköy, Çal =

Village in Turkey

Kocaköy
- Neighbourhood
- Location in Turkey Kocaköy (Turkey Aegean)
- Coordinates: 38.134444°N 29.470278°E
- Country: Turkey
- Province: Denizli
- District: Çal
- Population (2022): 226
- Time zone: UTC+3 (TRT)

Kocaköy is a neighbourhood in the municipality and district of Çal, Denizli Province in Turkey. Its population is 226 (2022).
