= Karapınar, Çal =

Village in Turkey

Karapınar
- Neighbourhood
- Location in Turkey Karapınar (Turkey Aegean)
- Coordinates: 37.905833°N 29.358889°E
- Country: Turkey
- Province: Denizli
- District: Çal
- Population (2022): 35
- Time zone: UTC+3 (TRT)

Karapınar is a neighbourhood in the municipality and district of Çal, Denizli Province in Turkey. Its population is 35 (2022).
