= Dayılar, Çal =

Village in Turkey

Dayılar
- Neighbourhood
- Location in Turkey Dayılar (Turkey Aegean)
- Coordinates: 38.083056°N 29.521944°E
- Country: Turkey
- Province: Denizli
- District: Çal
- Population (2022): 204
- Time zone: UTC+3 (TRT)

Dayılar is a neighbourhood in the municipality and district of Çal, Denizli Province in Turkey. Its population is 204 (2022).
