= Bahadırlar, Çal =

Village in Turkey

Bahadırlar
- Neighbourhood
- Location in Turkey Bahadırlar (Turkey Aegean)
- Coordinates: 38.1921°N 29.3155°E
- Country: Turkey
- Province: Denizli
- District: Çal
- Population (2022): 456
- Time zone: UTC+3 (TRT)

Bahadırlar is a neighbourhood in the municipality and district of Çal, Denizli Province in Turkey. Its population is 456 (2022).
