= Emir (grape) =

Indigenous white grape variety of Turkey

- Grape (Vitis)
- Color of berry skin: Blanc
- Species: Vitis vinifera
- Origin: Turkey
- Notable regions: Cappadocia, Nevşehir Province
- Notable wines: Still and sparkling wines

Emir is an indigenous white grape variety native to the Cappadocia region of central Turkey. It is primarily cultivated in Nevşehir Province and surrounding areas, where it is traditionally used in the production of crisp, high-acid white and sparkling wines.

== Regional context ==
Emir is a defining grape of the high-altitude vineyards of Central Anatolia, a vast inland plateau characterized by volcanic soils and continental climate. Along with other local varieties such as Kalecik Karası, Emir contributes to the distinctive wine styles of the region. Turkish wine enthusiasts sometimes describe Emir having a razor-sharp acidity and precise, penetrating character.

== History ==
Emir is considered one of the oldest local grape varieties of Central Anatolia. It has been cultivated for centuries in Cappadocia, where viticulture dates back to antiquity. The name "Emir" is derived from a Turkish word meaning “lord” or “ruler,” possibly reflecting the grape’s historical cultural importance in the region.

== Viticulture ==
Emir thrives in the continental climate of Cappadocia, characterized by hot summers, cold winters, and significant diurnal temperature variation. Vineyards are typically planted at elevations above 1,000 metres, where volcanic soils composed of sand, decomposed tuff and limestone contribute to the grape’s high natural acidity and minerality.

The berries are typically medium-sized and green-yellow, forming conical clusters. The variety ripens mid-season and produces naturally dry, high-acid musts that retain freshness at harvest.

== Wine styles and characteristics ==
Wines made from Emir are generally light to medium-bodied, with a pale straw to light yellow color and green reflections. They typically display pronounced acidity and a mineral profile, with aromas and flavors of citrus, green apple and subtle herbal notes.

Emir is most commonly vinified in stainless steel to preserve its fresh and vibrant character. It is not usually aged in oak barrels, as oak can overwhelm its delicate flavor profile. Most still Emir wines are intended for early consumption, generally within one to two years of bottling.

Due to its naturally high acidity, Emir is also well suited for the production of sparkling wines, which are typically crisp and refreshing.

== Food pairing ==
Emir wines are commonly paired with seafood, grilled fish, shellfish, salads, light cheeses, and traditional Turkish meze. Their high acidity and freshness make them suitable for dishes that benefit from a crisp, mineral white wine.

== See also ==
- Turkish wine
- Kalecik Karası
- Narince (grape)
