= Dağmarmara, Çal =

Village in Turkey

Dağmarmara
- Neighbourhood
- Location in Turkey Dağmarmara (Turkey Aegean)
- Coordinates: 38°07′N 29°13′E
- Country: Turkey
- Province: Denizli
- District: Çal
- Population (2022): 217
- Time zone: UTC+3 (TRT)

Dağmarmara is a neighbourhood in the municipality and district of Çal, Denizli Province in Turkey. Its population is 217 (2022).
