= Karapınar solar power plant =

Solar power plant in Turkey

Karapınar Photovoltaic Power Station
- Country: Turkey
- Coordinates: 37°47′27″N 33°35′05″E
- Status: Operational
- Commission date: 2022
- Construction cost: $1,300 million
- Owner: Kalyon Group
- Operator: Kalyon Group

Solar farm
- Type: Standard PV
- Project Manager: Gürler Duman

Power generation
- Nameplate capacity: 1,300 MW
- Annual net output: 1,700 GWh

External links
- Website: www.kalyonenerji.com/en/portfolio

Karapınar Solar Power Plant (Turkish: Karapınar Güneş Enerjisi Santrali) is a photovoltaic power station in Konya Province, central Turkey.

Built in the Renewable Energy Resource Area (YEKA) in Karapınar district in Konya Province, the plant has 1,300 MW installed power and covers an area of 20 square kilometres (7.7 sq mi). With this capacity, it is the largest single source of solar power in Turkey. The project includes a factory annually producing 500 MWp photovoltaic solar modules and a R&D Center.

The tender for the construction was won in 2017 by a consortium of the Turkish Kalyon Group and South Korea's Hanwha, which offered the lowest kW·h-price with 6.99 US cent valid for an energy purchase term of 15 years. The amount of the investment was expected to exceed US$1.3 billion. It is planned that more than 1,500 people will be employed in the project. First panels became operational in 2020, and the 3.5 million panel plant was completed in 2023. The solar power station generates 1,700 GWh annually, sufficient to supply 600,000 households. The site was reported to have been selected because formerly agricultural land had been desertified by climate change in Turkey.
