= Karapınar, Bismil =

Village in Diyarbakır Province, Turkey

Karapınar
- Neighbourhood
- Location in Turkey
- Coordinates: 37.763°N 40.679°E
- Country: Turkey
- Province: Diyarbakır
- District: Bismil
- Population (2022): 31
- Time zone: UTC+3 (TRT)

Karapınar (Kurdish: Karapar) (Note: Also known as Kara-Pouar and Karapoir.) is a neighbourhood in the municipality and district of Bismil, Diyarbakır Province in Turkey. The village is populated by Kurds of the Barava tribe and had a population of 31 in 2022.

== History ==
Kara-Pouar (today called Karapınar) was historically inhabited by Syriac Orthodox Christians. It was located in the kaza (district) of Silvan in the Diyarbekir sanjak in the Diyarbekir vilayet in c. 1900. The Chaldean Catholic priest Joseph Tfinkdji noted the village was also populated by Catholics in 1914. In 1914, it was populated by 100 Syriacs, according to the list presented to the Paris Peace Conference by the Assyro-Chaldean delegation. By 1914, it was situated in the Bafaya nahiyah (commune) of the kaza of Beşiri. No survivors of the Sayfo are attested from this area.

== Bibliography ==
- Courtois, Sébastien de (2004). The Forgotten Genocide: Eastern Christians, The Last Arameans. Translated by Vincent Aurora. Gorgias Press.
- Gaunt, David (2006). Massacres, Resistance, Protectors: Muslim-Christian Relations in Eastern Anatolia during World War I. Gorgias Press.
- Jongerden, Joost; Verheij, Jelle, eds. (2012). Social Relations in Ottoman Diyarbekir, 1870-1915. Brill.
- Tan, Altan (2018). Turabidin'den Berriye'ye. Aşiretler - Dinler - Diller - Kültürler (in Turkish). ISBN 9789944360944.
