= Çal =

- District and municipality
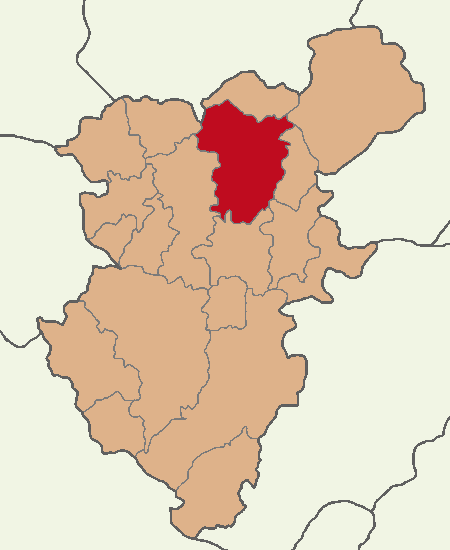
- Map showing Çal District in Denizli Province

- Location in Turkey Çal (Turkey Aegean)
- Coordinates: 38°5′1″N 29°23′56″E
- Country: Turkey
- Province: Denizli

Government
  - Mayor: Ahmet Hakan (CHP)
- Area: 860 km^{2} (330 sq mi)
- Population (2022): 17,889
  - Density: 21/km^{2} (54/sq mi)
- Time zone: UTC+3 (TRT)
- Area code: 0258
- Website: cal.bel.tr

Çal (Turkish: [tʃaɫ]) is a municipality and district of Denizli Province, Turkey. Its area is 860 km^{2}, and its population is 17,889 (2022). Çal district area occupies a central position in the northern part of its province and neighbors the district of Pamukkale to the south-west and the district areas of Güney to the west and Honaz to the south. To the east of Çal district lies clockwise the districts of Bekilli, Çivril and Baklan.

The town of Çal is located 64 km (40 mi) north-east of the provincial seat of Denizli and is situated on a rocky hilltop overlooking a plain traced by Büyük Menderes River. The town lies at an altitude of 850 m (2,790 ft).

== General features ==
Roman remains have been found in the area. Hançalar Bridge over Menderes River, at the level of the township of the same name, situated between Çal and Bekilli, is reminiscent of Roman bridges by its style, while the builder remains unknown. It was repaired and restored several times during the Ottoman era. The first Turks in the area were the Seljuk Turks in 1072, who settled in all parts of the present-day Denizli Province, including Çal.

The area is largely agricultural and is known especially for its vineyards. The local grape variety Çalkarası and grown intensively and takes its name from the district. Çal also has an annual wine festival. There is also a cement factory, a fruit-juice factory and various cold-stores for fruit.

== Composition ==
There are 34 neighbourhoods in Çal District:

- Akkent
- Alfaklar
- Aşağıseyit
- Bahadırlar
- Baklançakırlar
- Bayıralan
- Belevi
- Çalçakırlar
- Çalkuyucak
- Dağmarmara
- Dayılar
- Denizler
- Develler
- Gelinören
- Hançalar
- Hüseyinler
- İsabey
- İsmailler
- Kabalar
- Kaplanlar
- Karakaya
- Karapınar
- Kocaköy
- Mahmutgazi
- Ortaköy
- Peynirciler
- Sakızcılar
- Şapçılar
- Sazak
- Selcen
- Süller
- Yazır
- Yeşilyurt
- Yukarıseyit

== Sakızcılar Falls and the "Weeping Stone" ==
A notable sight of interest are the waterfalls near the depending village of Sakızcılar, on the slopes of the Mount Çal (Çaldağı) and at a distance of about 40 km (25 mi) when coming from Pamukkale. Water of a stream that later joins Menderes River fall from 50 meters high at this locality and the whole area is covered with forests, making it a notable natural site. It is also a large trout farm. The falls are alternatively called "Yeşildere Falls" or "Ağlayan Kaya" (the weeping stone).

== Notable natives ==
The renowned painter İbrahim Çallı was born here, as his name indicates.

The award-winning author and poet Hasan Ali Toptaş is from Çal.

== See also ==
- Çalkarası grape variety

== Image gallery ==
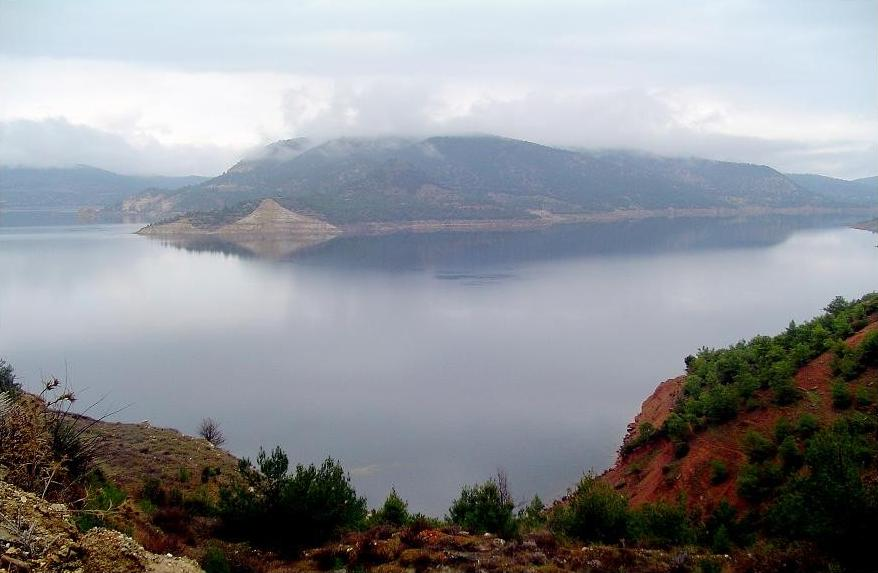
Adıgüzel Dam Reservoir at Çal district border

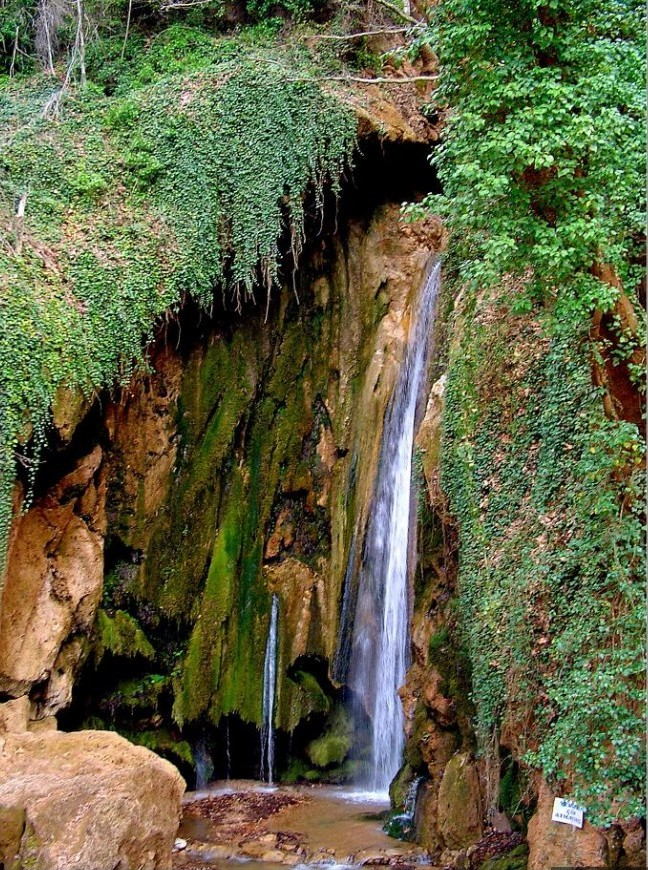
Sakızcılar

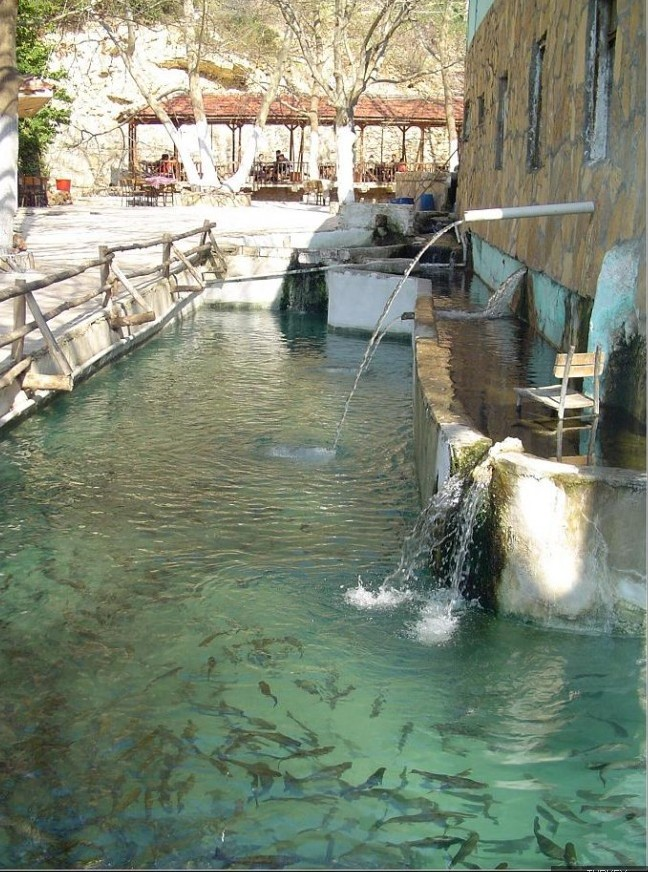
Waterfalls
