= Karapınar coalfield =

Karapınar coalfield is a coalfield in Konya Province in Turkey. The coalfield has reserves of 1.8 billion tonnes of lignite.
