= Kavaklıdere (winery) =

Turkish winery

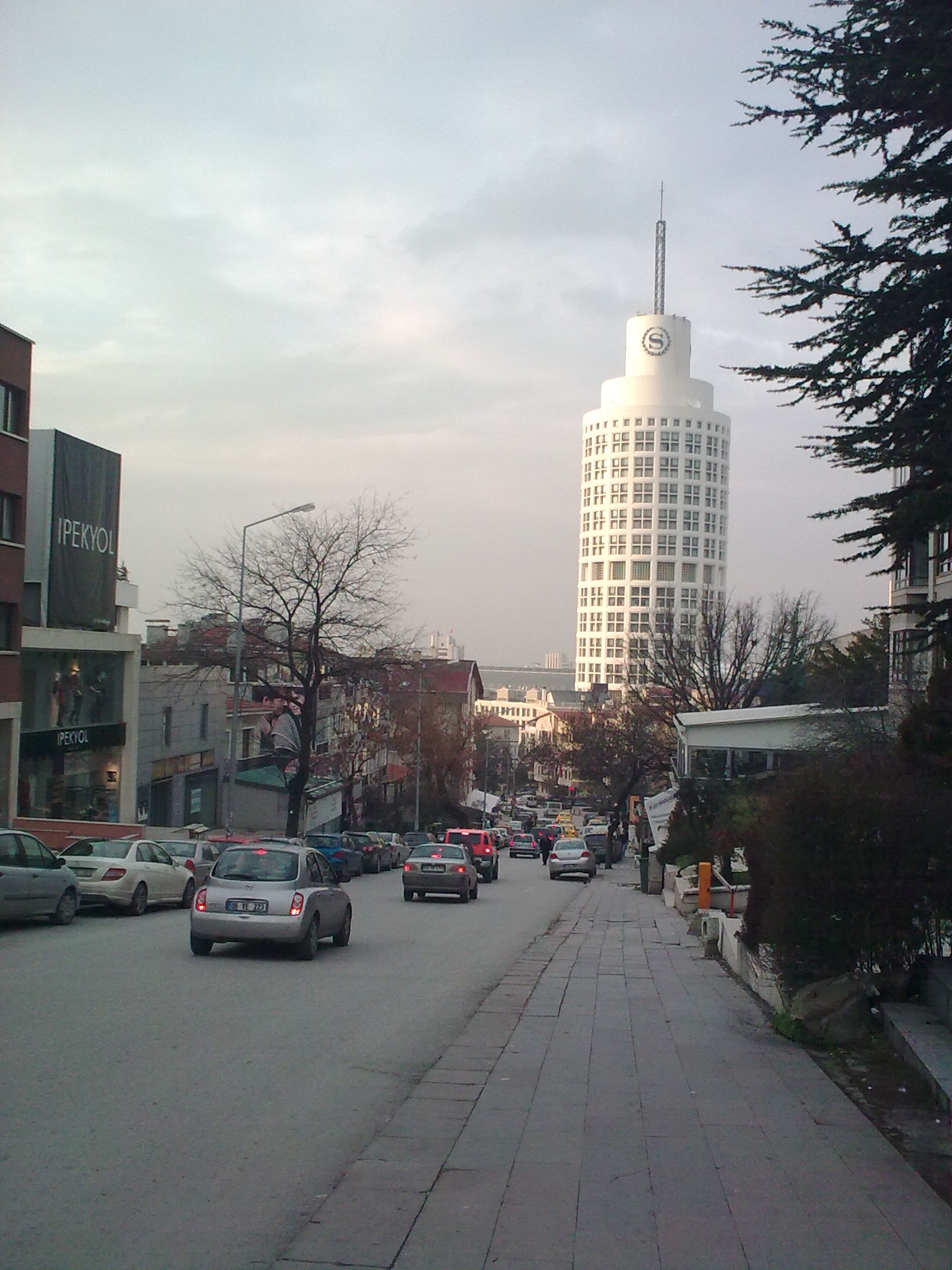
- Type: Wine
- Manufacturer: Kavaklıdere Wines Co., Ltd.
- Origin: Turkey
- Introduced: 1929
- Website: www.kavaklidere.com

Kavaklıdere is one of the best known wineries in Turkey. Founded by the And family, it is located in Ankara and is named after a neighborhood in the city.

Kalecik Karası, Boğazkere, and Öküzgözü are local grapes typically found in Turkish wines. These are often blended with Shiraz and other grapes. Boğazkere and Öküzgözü can balance sweeter wines with their spiciness.

== History ==
After meeting and marrying in Switzerland, Sevda And and Cenap And settled in Ankara in 1928. Recognizing the winemaking potential of the Kavaklıdere district, they purchased vineyards and land in the area and, in 1929, founded the Kavaklıdere Wine Factory (Kavaklıdere Şarap İmalathanesi). They began producing wine using grapes from their own vineyards as well as those from other vineyards in the Ankara region. During this period, Hungarian craftsman Balaj, who was working on the construction of the nearby Ziraat Bank Building, contributed significantly to their efforts by sharing his knowledge of traditional winemaking techniques.

The company grew further when Sevda And’s brother, diplomat İnsan Tunalı, left his position at the Ministry of Foreign Affairs to join the family business. To ensure the company’s continuity, Tunalı adopted Uğurlu Tunalı, who began working at the company in 1943. After graduating from the Ankara University Faculty of Agriculture in 1949, Uğurlu Tunalı assumed a more active role in company management.

Following the unexpected death of İnsan Tunalı from a stroke in 1953 and Sevda And’s death in a car accident in 1958, the company’s development slowed. It was subsequently managed by Cenap And and the heirs of İnsan Tunalı, his widow Nerime Tunal and his adopted son Uğurlu Tunalı. After Nerime Tunalı’s death, the increasing number of shareholders led to a period of stagnation for the company.

== See also ==
- Turkish wine
