= Çavuş (grape) =

Variety of grape

- Grape (Vitis)
- Color of berry skin: White
- Species: Vitis vinifera
- Origin: Turkey
- Notable regions: Bozcaada, Marmara region
- Sex of flowers: Female
- VIVC number: 10196

Çavuş (Bozcaada Çavuşu), is a white prolific Turkish grape variety which is grown especially in Bozcaada-Çanakkale, Marmara region and Central Anatolia Region.

== Origin ==
This variety has different hypotheses about its origin and spread, is known as Bozcaada Çavuşu in its home country since it is mostly grown in Bozcaada. As a result of the recent studies, Bozcaada Çavuşu was registered by the Turkish Trademark and Patent Authority in 2020 and received a geographical indication under the name of Bozcaada Çavuş Üzümü.

== Viticulture ==
Çavuş is an early ripening grape variety in the vineyard. Flowering period is sensitive. The bunch is large, the berries are very large, seeded and thin-skinned. The leaves of the vine are wide. Due to the preference of seedless grapes for table grape consumption, its market share in table grapes decreases.

== Winemaking ==
Although Bozcaada Çavuşu is a table grape variety, it has also used for white wine production, especially in Bozcaada recently. Wines from Çavuş are generally low in acidity and semi-aromatic. Çavuş wines are not suitable for aging.
