= Tekel =

Turkish tobacco and alcohol company

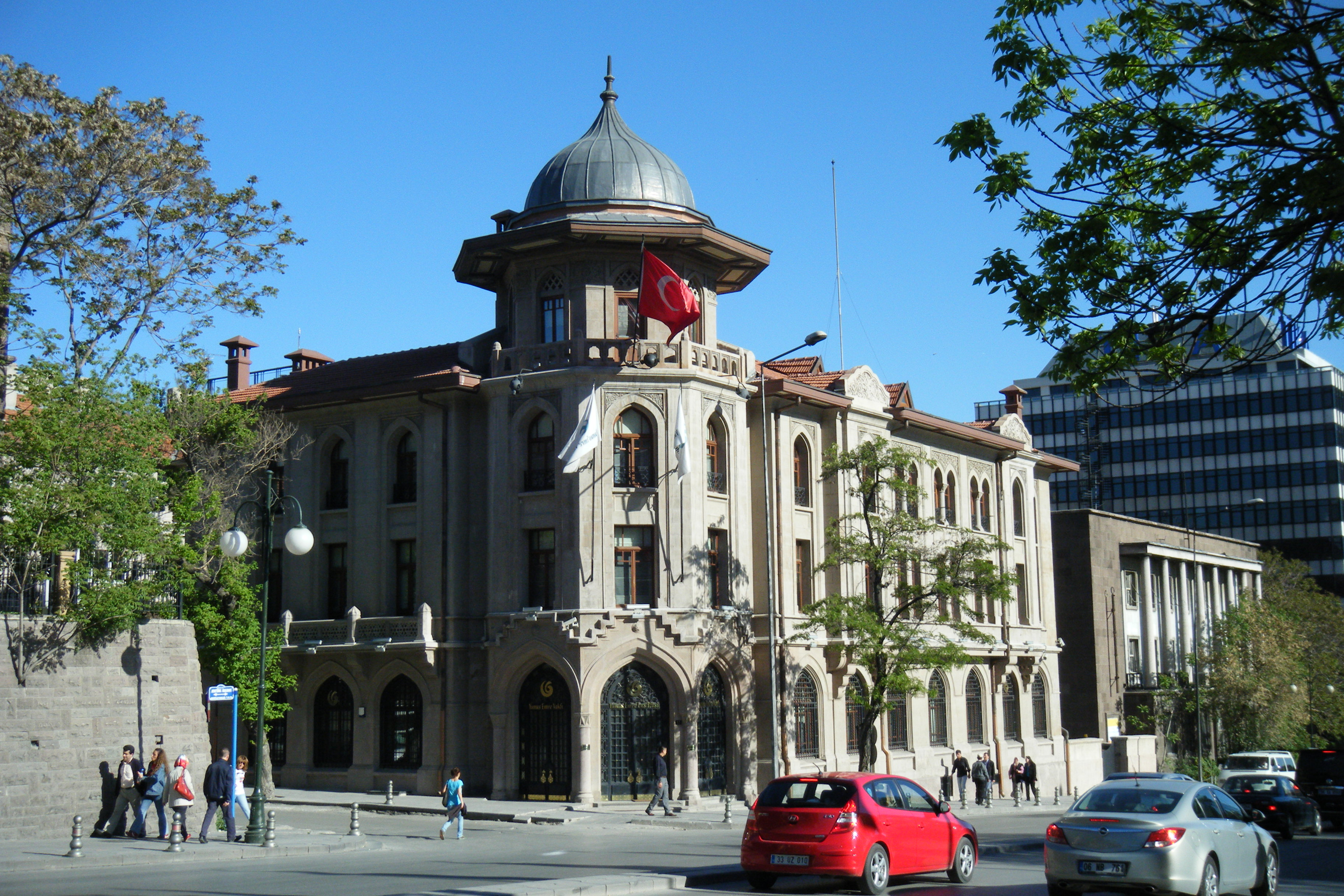
- Former Tekel Building in Ankara, currently the seat of Yunus Emre Institute
- Type: Subsidiary
- Industry: Tobacco
- Founded: 1862; 164 years ago
- Defunct: 2008; 18 years ago
- Fate: Acquired by British American Tobacco in 2008, becoming a brand; factories closed in 2009
- Headquarters: Istanbul, Turkey
- Products: Cigarettes
- Revenue: $3.6 billion USD (2004)
- Net income: $2.4 billion USD (2004)
- Number of employees: 10,000
- Parent: British American Tobacco

Tekel A.Ş. (Turkish, literally single-hand or monopoly and generally capitalised as TEKEL) was a Turkish tobacco and alcoholic beverages company. It was nationalised in 1925 from a parastatal (government owned/controlled) company, the Régie. A joint foreign and Ottoman consortium, the Régie was short for "La Société de la régie co-intéressée des tabacs de l'Empire Ottoman".

Tekel evolved into the sole manufacturer and distributor of all alcohol and tobacco products in Turkey. Later on, Tekel was no longer a monopoly; however it had controlled taxing and distribution of all alcohol and tobacco products in Turkey until the end. The taxation department was handed over to the Turkish Revenue Administration after privatisation.

Tekel's alcoholic beverages division was privatised in 2004, leading to the establishment of Mey İçki. British American Tobacco acquired Tekel's cigarette business assets in June 2008.

== History ==
=== Foundation and early history ===
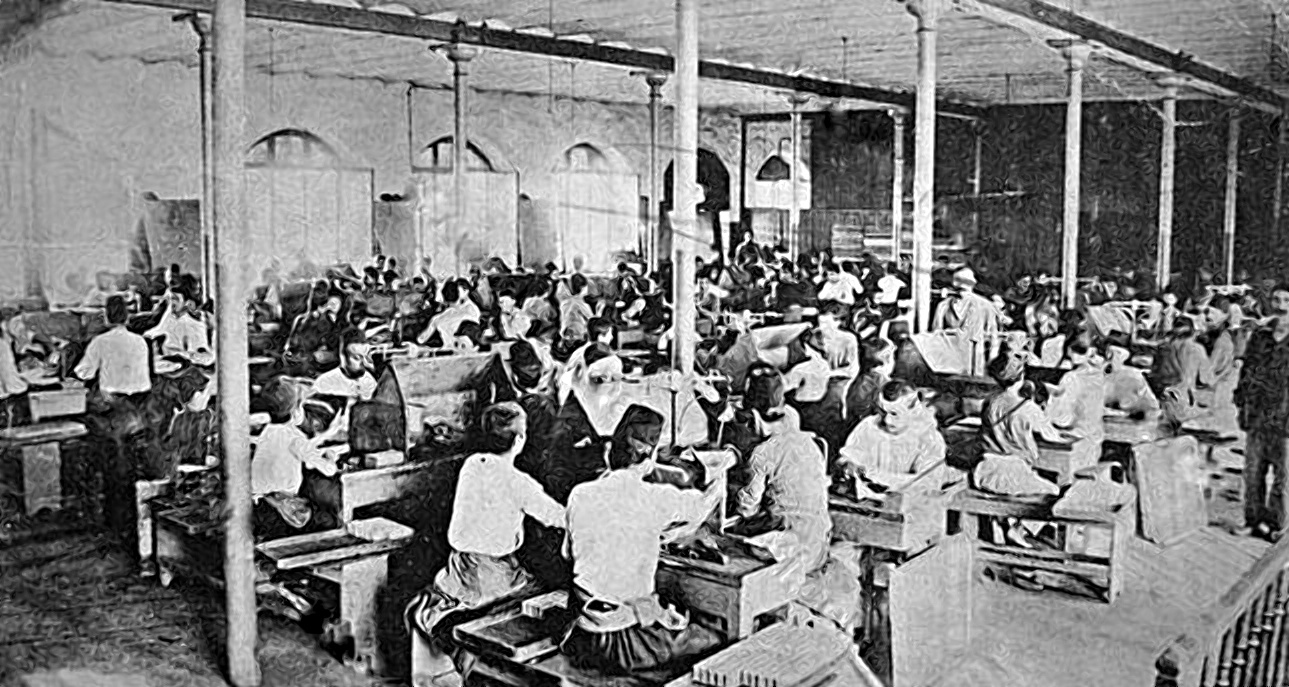
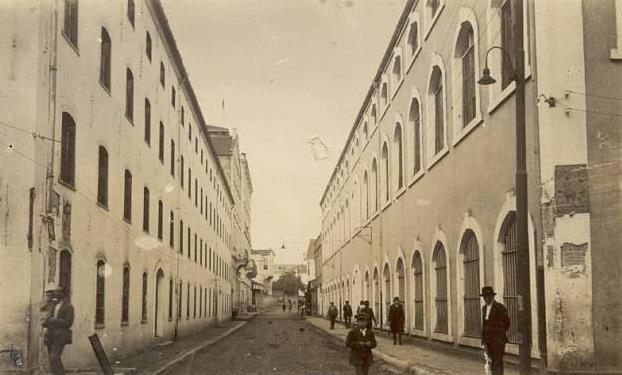
Two images of the Tekel factory, (above): Workers in the early 20th century; (below): View of the facades in the 1930s

Turkish tobacco was an important industrial crop, where its cultivation and manufacture were monopolies under capitulations of the Ottoman Empire. The tobacco and cigarette trade was controlled by two companies the "Regie Compagnie interessee des tabacs de l'empire Ottoman", and French "Narquileh tobacco." These companies founded as a monopoly in 1862 by the Ottoman government for the payment of its international debt. Original purpose of the company was to deal with tobacco products. It later became a part of an even greater monopoly, the Ottoman Tobacco Company also known as the Régie, which controlled all trade, finance, and manufacturing in the empire.

For the first time in 1862, via commercial agreements between the Ottoman Government, France and Britain, tobacco importation had been prohibited and monopoly had been established.

In accordance with the “Rusumu Sitte” Decree published in 1879, the monopoly income of salt, tobacco and alcohol went to the Ottoman Public Debt Administration, and the operation of the Tobacco Monopoly was transferred to the Ottoman Tobacco Company.

The duty of performing the “monopoly” tasks regarding tobacco, alcohol drinks, salt, gunpowder and explosives had been appointed to the Monopolies Public directorate starting at its founding in 1932.

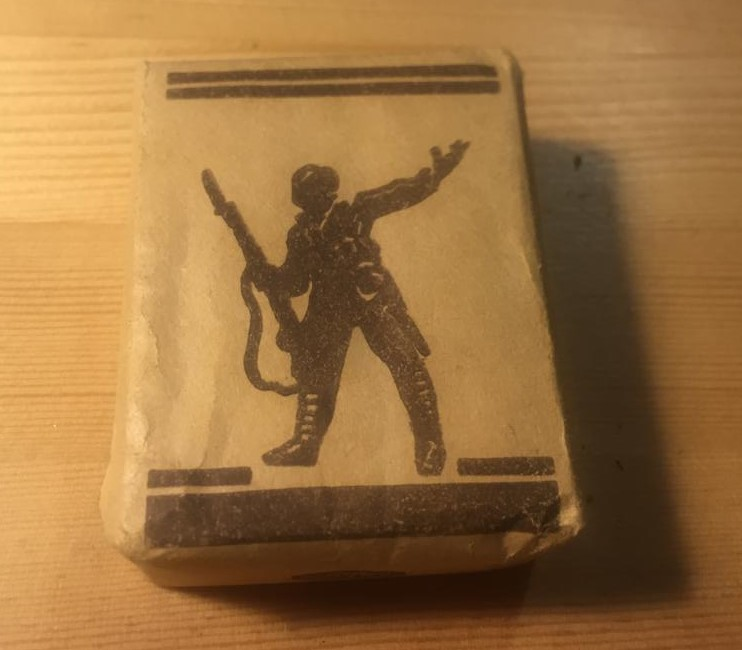
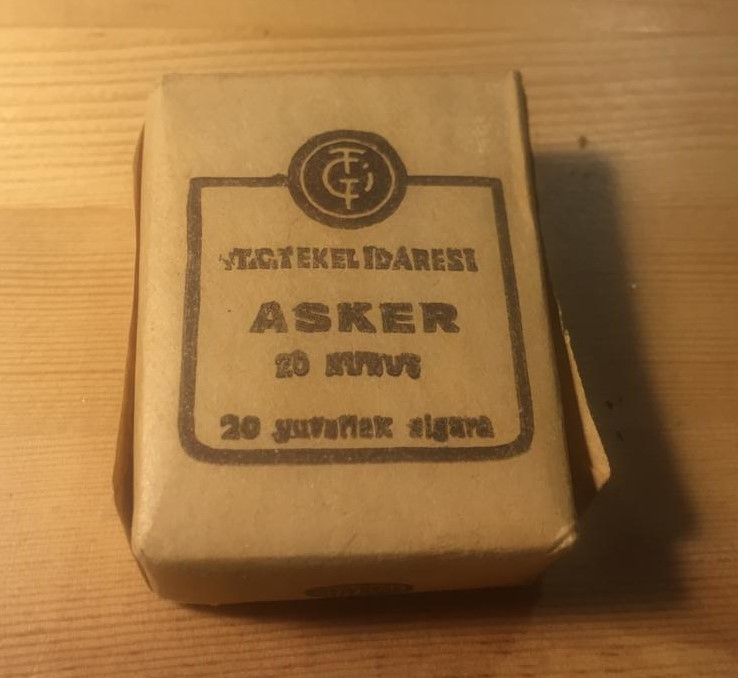
Two images of the special TEKEL brand cigarette for soldiers of Turkish Army (1960s)

Tobacco, alcoholic beverages, and salt were given a state monopoly in 1932; explosives and gunpowder in 1934; beer in 1939; tea and coffee in 1942; and matches in 1946. Coffee was released from the State monopoly in 1946, matches in 1952, gunpowder and explosives and beer in 1955 and tobacco in 1986.

The Minister of Finance (Maliye Bakanı) were designated as the general director of Tekel.

=== Privatisation ===
In the early 2000s, then Turkish Prime Minister Bülent Ecevit pushed through controversial legislation which would allow for the privatisation of Tekel.

In January 2003, then Turkish Deputy Prime Minister Abdullatif Sener announced plans to privatise Tekel in the first half of the year, as part of a $16bn loan agreement with the International Monetary Fund (IMF), stating, "These are privatisations which have been planned for years and should have been taken care of a long time ago." He promised that the jobs of workers affected by the privatisations would be safeguarded but warned that unprofitable businesses would be closed down.

These privatisation plans were dropped in November of that year when the leading $1.15bn bid by Japan Tobacco International was deemed too far below government expectations. Turkey's operating environment, perceived problems with regulation, and competition with major players such as Philip Morris and Japan Tobacco International, already active in the Turkish market, were thought by analysts to have lowered the bids.

The alcoholic beverages division was privatised separately in 2004, with the establishment of Mey İçki.

The UK-based British American Tobacco (BAT) won the auction for Tekel's cigarette business assets on 22 February 2008 with a bid of US$1.72 billion. The acquisition was completed on 24 June 2008, following regulatory approval. The acquisition made BAT the second-largest tobacco company in Turkey, with a 36% market share.

=== 2009–10 industrial action ===
In December 2009, following the privatisation, the Turkish government announced that 12 Tekel factories would close with the 10,000 workers redeployed in other public sector jobs on 11-month temporary contracts (4/C status) with pay-cuts up to 40% and reduced employment rights. This sparked industrial action, which began on 15 December, by the workers, who claimed the changes would cut their monthly wage and leave them without any severance pay. An estimated 12,000 workers from across the country set up camp in a Central Park in Ankara where they were forced off with teargas and pepper spray fired by riot police. They subsequently reestablished their camp in front of the head office of Turkey's main trade union organisation, Confederation of Turkish Trade Unions (Türk-İş). The protesters engaged in public demonstrations outside the headquarters of the ruling Justice and Development Party (AKP), and several protesters were admitted to hospital after refusing food and water.

Media images of the protests provoked angry rows in the Turkish parliament, and analysts believed the situation had inflicted political damage on a government heavily reliant on conservative working-class support. Turkish Prime Minister Recep Tayyip Erdoğan said the government would not "dole out money to workers for not producing anything" and challenged the protesters to start their own businesses. He ordered Finance Minister Mehmet Şimşek and Labour Minister Hayati Yazıcı to find a formula to resolve the dispute.

On 4 February 2010, tens of thousands of Turkish workers took part in a one-day general strike organised by Türk-İş in support of the protest. Public services, including transport, were disrupted across the country and the largest demonstrations were reported in Ankara (20,000 demonstrators) and İzmir (15,000 demonstrators).

In March 2010, the union decided to dismantle the Ankara protest camp after the Council of State ruled against the 30-day deadline for workers to apply for temporary employment under the 4C scheme. The union announced that protests would continue.

== See also ==
- Turkish wine
- Buzbağ
- Raki
