= Çalkarası =

Indigenous Turkish red grape variety

Çal Karası
- Grape (Vitis)
- Color of berry skin: Red
- Species: Vitis vinifera
- Origin: Turkey
- Notable regions: Çal, Denizli Province
- Notable wines: Red, rosé, blanc de noirs, sparkling wines

Çal Karası is an indigenous Turkish red grape variety originating from the Çal district of Denizli Province in western Turkey. It is traditionally associated with the upper Büyük Menderes basin and is considered one of the most distinctive local grape varieties of the inland Aegean region. Wines made from Çal Karası are known for their freshness, aromatic profile, and stylistic versatility.

The grape also gives its name to wines produced from it, which are commonly described as showing red berry, sour cherry, floral, herbal, and subtle spice characteristics.

== History ==
Çal Karası is regarded as a local selection from a region with a long history of viticulture dating back to antiquity. Vine growing in and around Çal has been documented for thousands of years, and the grape is believed to have developed locally through mass selection rather than formal breeding.

For much of the 20th century, Çal Karası was primarily used for local consumption. Renewed interest in indigenous Turkish grape varieties in the early 21st century contributed to its preservation and increased visibility in commercial winemaking.

== Distribution and regional context ==
Çal Karası is closely associated with the Çal district and nearby villages such as Hançalar. Vineyards are typically located on elevated plateaus at approximately 800–900 metres above sea level, where continental influences moderate the warm Aegean climate.

Soils in the region are predominantly clay and loam, with notable limestone and chalk deposits. These conditions contribute to the grape’s natural acidity and aromatic clarity.

== Viticulture ==
Çal Karası has relatively low anthocyanin levels, resulting in wines that are lighter in color and lower in tannin compared with many other Turkish red varieties. Many vineyards consist of old vines, often 35 years or older, traditionally trained as head-trained bush vines (goblet).

Genetic research conducted by Paşaeli Winery in collaboration with ampelographer José Vouillamoz has shown that Çal Karası is genetically identical to Liatiko, a red grape variety widely planted on Crete. While the two varieties share identical DNA profiles, the historical direction of their spread has not been conclusively established.

== Wine styles and characteristics ==
Wines made from Çal Karası are typically medium-bodied with medium to high acidity, moderate alcohol levels, and a soft, silky mouthfeel. Aromatic profiles often include red berries, sour cherry, rhubarb, floral notes, and subtle herbal or spicy elements.

The grape has demonstrated notable stylistic versatility. In addition to red wines, it is used to produce rosé wines, blanc de noirs, sparkling wines, and naturally sweet styles. When oak is used, neutral or older barrels are generally preferred, as heavy oak can dominate the grape’s delicate flavor profile.

== International recognition ==
In the 2020s, wines made from Çal Karası began receiving international recognition at major wine competitions. At the Turkish Wine Challenge 2023, a rosé blend labelled as Çal Karası–Kalecik Karası produced by Kuzubağ received a Gold medal.

Subsequent vintages of Kuzubağ Çal Karası received additional international recognition. The 2021 vintage was awarded a Commended medal at the Berliner Wine Trophy 2023 and a Bronze medal at the Decanter World Wine Awards 2023, while examples from the 2021 and 2022 vintages also received medals at the AWC Vienna and the International Wine & Spirit Competition.

In 2025, Paşaeli Çal Karası Merman Wild Ferment (2023 vintage) was awarded a Silver medal at the Balkan International Wine Competition, further contributing to the grape’s international profile.

== Food pairing ==
Çal Karası wines are often paired with a wide range of dishes, including grilled vegetables, poultry, seafood, light meat dishes, and Aegean cuisine. Their acidity and moderate structure allow them to complement diverse flavors and cooking styles.

== See also ==
- Boğazkere
- Kalecik Karası
- Öküzgözü
- Papazkarası
