= Papazkarası =

Indigenous Turkish red grape variety

- Grape (Vitis)
- Color of berry skin: Red
- Species: Vitis vinifera
- Also called: Papaskarası; Papaskara
- Origin: Turkey
- Notable regions: East Thrace (notably Kırklareli and Edirne)
- Notable wines: Varietal red, rosé, and blanc de noirs wines
- VIVC number: 8923

Papazkarası, also Papaskarası and Papaskara (“priest’s black”), is an indigenous Turkish red grape variety traditionally associated with East Thrace in the Marmara Region of Turkey. Historically used in blends with international varieties such as Cinsaut, Cabernet Sauvignon, and Merlot, it is now increasingly vinified as a varietal red as well as in rosé and blanc de noirs styles.

Papazkarası is widely described as producing wines with high natural acidity, moderate tannin, and aromatic profiles that include red fruit, floral notes, and spice. Alcohol levels typically range between 11 and 13 percent, depending on site and vintage.

== History and growing regions ==
Papazkarası is considered a long-established Thracian variety with a winemaking history that predates the Eastern Roman Empire. It is primarily grown in the European part of Turkey, particularly around Kırklareli and Edirne. Within this area, the Üsküp (Uskup) region of Kırklareli is often cited by winemakers as a particularly suitable terroir due to its decomposed granite soils, which tend to produce low yields and small grape bunches.

Many vineyards consist of old, head-trained bush vines, especially in upper Thrace. In more fertile lowland sites, bunch weights may be significantly higher. Veraison typically occurs in mid to late August, with harvest extending from mid-October to mid-November, reflecting the grape’s late-ripening nature.

== Viticulture ==
Papazkarası is a late-ripening variety with relatively high growing degree-day requirements. It is noted for maintaining high acidity even at advanced ripeness and can reach elevated sugar levels in warmer, lowland Thracian sites. Academic studies on Papazkarası cultivated in Kırklareli highlight its suitability for both winemaking and table use, as well as its aromatic intensity and balanced phenolic profile.

== Genetics and related varieties ==
Ampelographic and genetic research places Papazkarası among the traditional Balkan grape varieties. Parentage analysis has suggested that it likely resulted from a natural cross involving Prokupac and Alba Imputotato. The grape is listed in the Vitis International Variety Catalogue (VIVC) under number 8923.

Closely related or similarly named varieties are reported in parts of the Balkans and Greece, where it is registered under names such as Kara Papas or Karapapas, reflecting shared viticultural heritage across the region.

== Role during the phylloxera crisis and French trade ==
During the late 19th century phylloxera crisis, which devastated vineyards across France, the Ottoman Empire emerged as a significant alternative supplier of wine to the French market. Research based on French commercial archives shows that wines from Ottoman territories, particularly from Thrace and the Marmara region, were exported in large volumes to compensate for shortages in French production.

French sources from the period describe Thracian red wines as deeply colored, high in alcohol, and structurally robust. These qualities made them especially suitable for blending with weakened French wines and for reinforcing domestic production during the crisis years. Although French trade documents rarely identified individual grape varieties by name, Papazkarası dominated red wine production in Thrace at the time, making it highly likely that Papazkarası-based wines formed a substantial part of this export trade. This period represents an early form of international recognition for Thracian grape varieties within European wine markets.

== Wine styles and characteristics ==
Papazkarası is vinified today as a varietal red wine and increasingly as rosé and blanc de noirs. Varietal reds are typically medium-bodied, with bright acidity and moderate tannin. Winemaking practices often emphasize freshness, with restrained or neutral oak used to preserve aromatic clarity.

== International recognition (21st century) ==
In the 2020s, several wines made from Papazkarası have received medals at international competitions. At the Balkan International Wine Competition 2025, Chamlija’s Papazkarası expressions — including the Cuvée Marcel Biron 2022 and Kara Sevda 2022 — were awarded Silver medals. These results reflect increasing international visibility for indigenous Thracian grape varieties in competitive contexts.

The producer Chamlija has also received broader international recognition at competitions such as the AWC Vienna International Wine Competition, where it has been honoured as a top national producer and won numerous medals across multiple categories in the early 2020s. Such accolades contribute to the reputation of wines made from native varieties including Papazkarası among global wine enthusiasts and judges.

== See also ==
- Boğazkere
- Çalkarası
- Kalecik Karası
- Öküzgözü
