= Boğazkere =

Indigenous Turkish red grape variety

- Grape (Vitis)
- Color of berry skin: Red
- Species: Vitis vinifera
- Origin: Turkey
- Notable regions: Diyarbakır, Southeastern Anatolia
- Notable wines: Varietal wines; blends (especially with Öküzgözü)
- VIVC number: 1873

Boğazkere is an indigenous red grape variety of Turkey, originating in Diyarbakır Province near the Tigris River in the Southeastern Anatolia Region. It is widely regarded as one of Turkey’s most structured and tannic red wine grapes and plays a central role in both traditional and modern Turkish red wine production.

The name Boğazkere roughly translates as “throat-burner” in Turkish, a reference to the grape’s naturally high tannins and firm structure, particularly evident in young or unblended wines.

== Origins and regional context ==
Boğazkere is native to Southeastern Anatolia, with its historic center of cultivation around Diyarbakır. The region lies along the upper reaches of the Tigris basin and is characterized by hot summers, cold winters, and strong continental climatic influence. These conditions contribute to the grape’s thick skins, high phenolic content, and deep color.

Traditional vineyards are commonly planted on calcareous and alluvial soils. While Diyarbakır remains the symbolic heartland of the variety, Boğazkere is now also cultivated in other parts of Eastern and Southeastern Anatolia due to growing demand and improved viticultural practices.

== Viticulture ==
Boğazkere is a late-ripening grape that requires a long, warm growing season to achieve full phenolic maturity. It produces small to medium-sized berries with thick skins and high tannin levels. These characteristics make the variety relatively drought-resistant but demanding in vineyard management, particularly with respect to yield control and harvest timing.

The grape is officially registered in the Vitis International Variety Catalogue under number 1873, confirming its classification as a distinct Vitis vinifera variety.

== Wine styles and characteristics ==
Wines made from Boğazkere are typically deeply colored, ranging from dark ruby to purple. They are full-bodied, with pronounced tannins and aromas commonly described as dried red and black fruits, fig, spice, and sometimes earthy or leathery notes. Due to their structure, quality examples are considered suitable for extended aging, often developing positively for ten years or more.

Boğazkere is frequently aged in oak barrels, where maturation can soften tannins and introduce secondary aromas such as vanilla, cocoa, and sweet spice. The grape is also widely used in blends, most notably with Öküzgözü. In this traditional pairing, Boğazkere provides structure and aging potential, while Öküzgözü contributes fruit expression and acidity.

== International recognition ==
In the 2020s, wines made from Boğazkere have increasingly received recognition at international wine competitions. At the Turkish Wine Challenge 2024, Sagavin Boğazkere & Öküzgözü (2022 vintage) received a Gold medal, while Vinkara Grand Reserve Boğazkere (2018 vintage) was awarded a Silver medal at the same competition.

At the Turkish Wine Challenge 2023, Asmadan Kor Reserve Öküzgözü–Boğazkere (2020 vintage) also received a Gold medal, further highlighting the international appraisal of Boğazkere-based wines in contemporary competitions.

== Food pairing ==
Boğazkere wines are commonly paired with robust dishes such as red meat kebabs, lamb, game, and slow-cooked stews. They are also recommended with aged cheeses, particularly hard and regional Eastern Anatolian varieties. The wine’s tannic structure allows it to complement dishes with rich flavors and higher fat content.

== See also ==
- Öküzgözü
- Çalkarası
- Kalecik Karası
- Papazkarası
