= Kalecik Karası =

Turkish grape and wine

- Grape (Vitis)
- Color of berry skin: Red
- Species: Vitis vinifera
- Origin: Turkey
- Notable regions: Kalecik, Denizli Province
- VIVC number: 5936

Kalecik Karası is a Turkish grape variety and a Turkish wine produced from this grape. It is named after the Kalecik district of Ankara Province, Turkey, where it grows particularly well. The microclimate created by the Kızılırmak River and soils rich in marine fossils provide optimum conditions for cultivating high-quality Kalecik Karası vines.

Kalecik Karası wine

Kalecik Karası grapes are known for their distinctive taste and aromatic profile. In good vintages, wines made from Kalecik Karası have won several awards in international wine competitions, enhancing the grape’s reputation both domestically and abroad.

== History and significance ==
Kalecik Karası was once on the brink of extinction due to phylloxera and a long period of neglect. Its revival is largely credited to Prof. Dr. Y. Sabit Ağaoğlu of Ankara University, who rediscovered and propagated the variety through clonal selection in the 1970s, preventing its disappearance and helping establish it as one of Turkey’s most important indigenous wine grapes.

Because of its high demand, the grape is also cultivated in other regions with similar climatic conditions, such as the high grounds of the Denizli region.

== Viticulture ==
Kalecik Karası vines thrive in the pebbly clay loam soils of Central Anatolia. The variety produces medium-sized blue-black berries in compact clusters. It is typically harvested in mid- to late-September and is valued for its ability to express both fruit and terroir distinctly in wine.

== Wine styles and characteristics ==
A typical Kalecik Karası wine is light to medium-bodied with a ruby red color. It is often rich and well balanced, with lasting red fruit aromas. When aged in oak, vanilla and cacao notes may also emerge. The wine generally has an alcohol content between 12 and 14% and a moderate acidity, and is traditionally served around 16–18°C.

Producers also make rosé and traditional method sparkling wines from Kalecik Karası, demonstrating the grape’s versatility.

Several Kalecik Karası wines have received recognition at international wine competitions. For example, the 2021 vintage of Kuzubağ Kalecik Karası received an award at the International Wine Challenge, a long-established international wine competition judged by panels of experts.

== Food pairing ==
Kalecik Karası pairs well with lamb and beef dishes, grilled meats, tomato-based sauces, and aged cheeses. Its fresh acidity and fruit-driven profile also complement Mediterranean-style cuisine.

== See also ==
- Boğazkere
- Çalkarası
- Öküzgözü
- Papazkarası
