= Zeybek (dance) =

Turkish folk dance

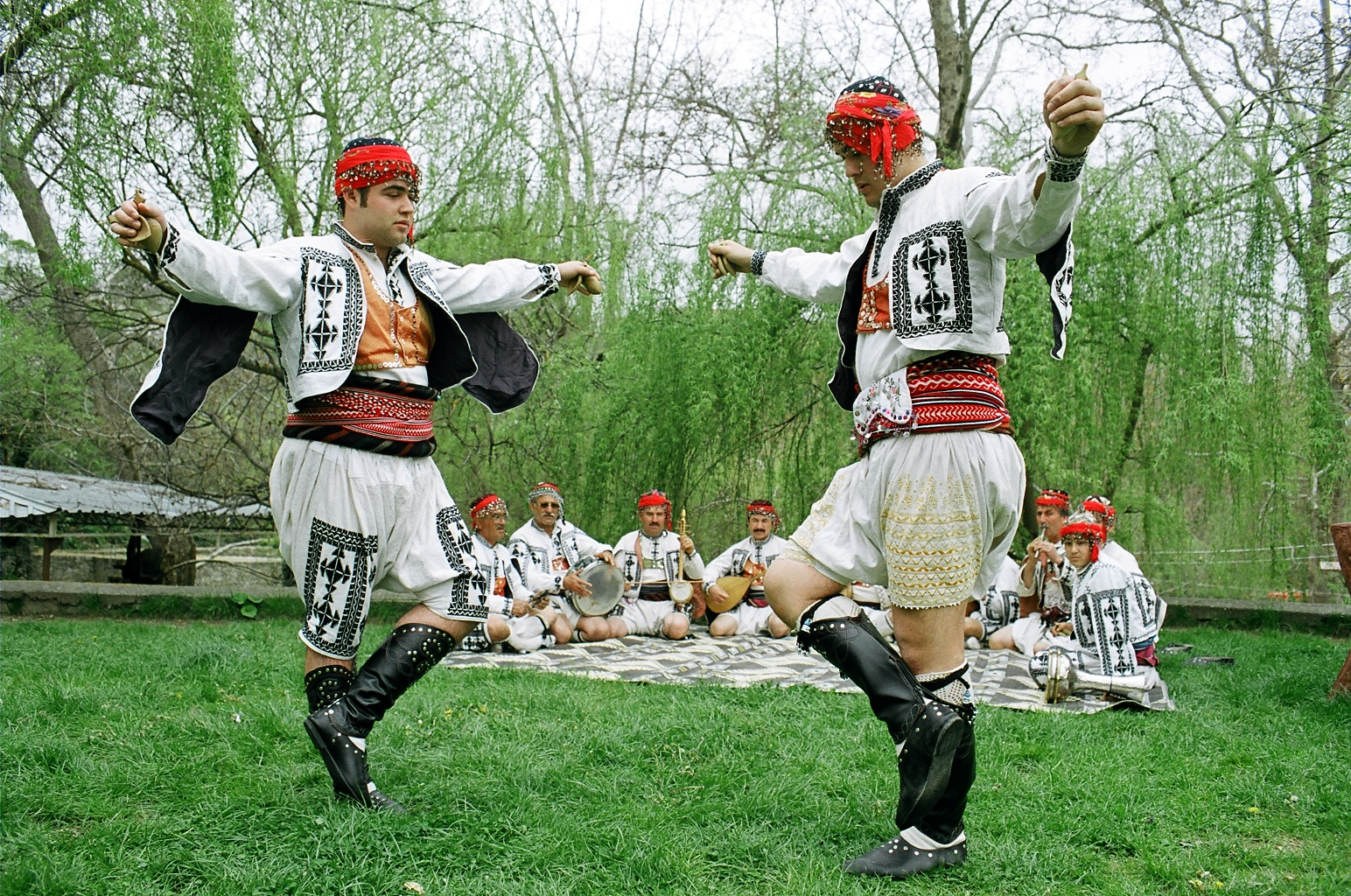
- Zeybek from Balıkesir
- Genre: Turkish folk dance
- Origin: Aegean Region, Turkey

Zeybek is a traditional Turkish folk dance that originated from the Aegean Region of Turkey during the Ottoman period. It was performed by and named after the Zeybeks, and was later popularized in the early 20th century by Selim Sırrı Tarcan.

There are over 150 regional variations of the dance, ranging from the slower ağır zeybek to the more livelier kıvrak zeybek. Today, the Zeybek dance stands as a symbol of dignity, pride, and heroism within Turkish culture, embraced at weddings and festive gatherings, as well as by women for its graceful yet powerful movements and its symbolic evocation of honor and bravery.

== Etymology ==
The word zeybek was first attested in Ottoman Turkish sources of the 15th century, appearing in the chronicle Tevārīḫ-i Āl-i ʿOsmān of the Ottoman historian Aşıkpaşazade.

Although its exact origin remains uncertain, several etymological theories have been proposed, with a Turkic origin considered the most plausible. According to the Turkish musicologist and composer Onur Akdoğu, zeybek derives from the Old Turkic compound saybek, meaning “valiant lord”, formed from say (“strong, brave”) and bek (“chieftain”). Other scholars suggest alternative Turkic origins. For instance, professor Mehmet Öcal Özbilgin argues that the word stems from military terminology, originating from sü (“army”) and bey / bek (“lord”), thus conveying a sense of “leader of troops.”

The word and its derivatives appear in various neighboring cultures, reflecting the historical influence of the Zeybek dance. In Greece, a related form of the dance is known as the Zeibekiko, which evolved from the Turkish Zeybek dance. It was introduced to mainland Greece by Asia Minor Greeks and gained widespread popularity following the Greek–Turkish population exchange of 1923, eventually becoming one of the most iconic dances in Greek culture. In Albania, a dance called "Zebekshe" is also found in the Mat region, where it is described as “the dance of the freedom fighters” in reference to the Zeybeks. However, the Albanian version shows little to no resemblance in both style and structure from its Turkish counterpart.

== History ==
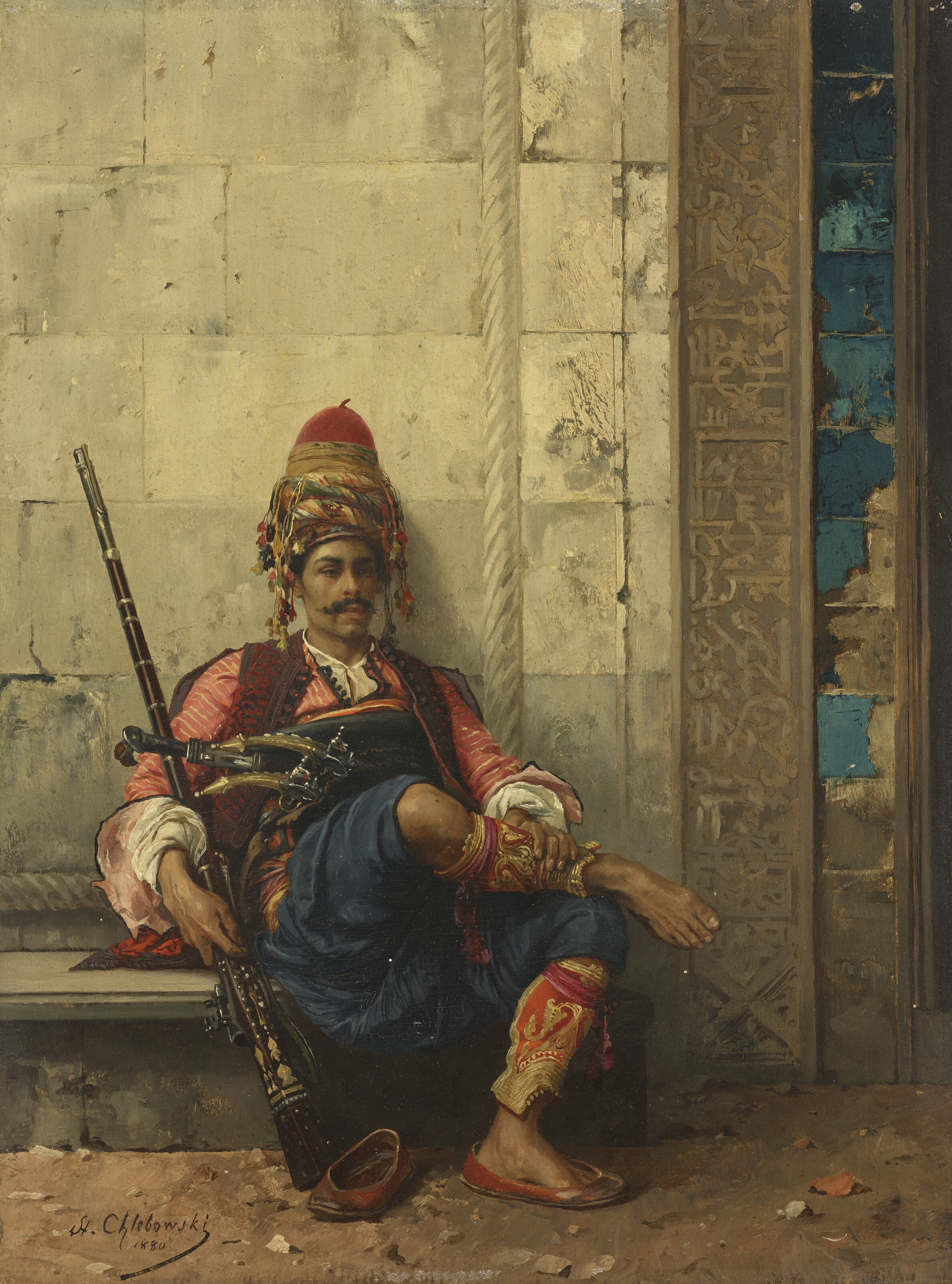
Zeybek à Brousse (Bursa), Stanisław Chlebowski, 1880

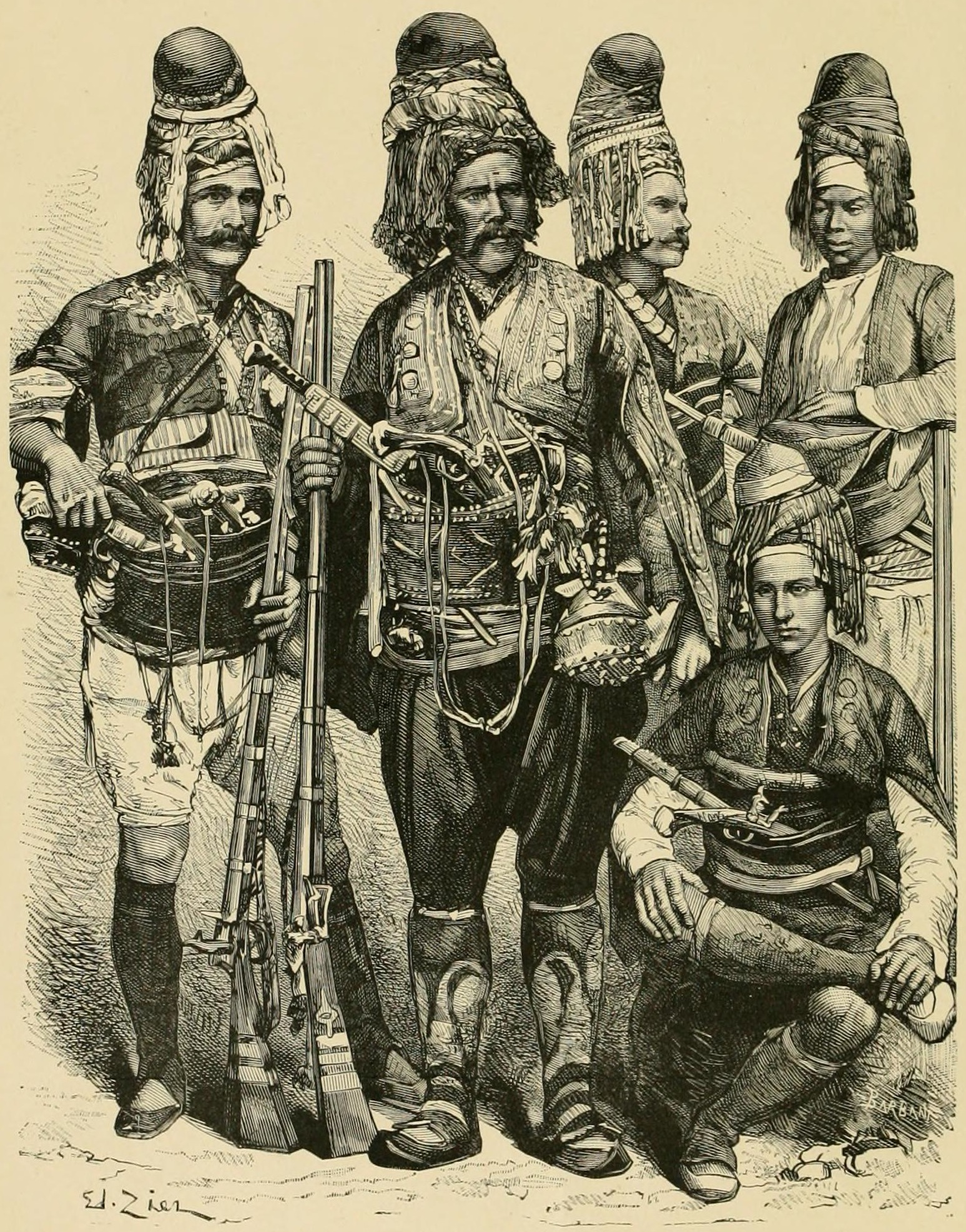
Group of Zeibeks, Élisée Reclus, 1876

=== Origins ===
One of the earliest accounts of the Zeybek dance dates from the 17th century, when Ottoman Turkish traveler Evliya Çelebi described local dances in Manisa and Aydın during festivals, noting their distinctive martial gestures and proud postures.

The dance takes its name from the Zeybeks, a group of irregular soldiers of the late Ottoman period. The Zeybeks emerged in the mountainous regions of Western Anatolia as outlaws during times of weakened state control. Much like a Turkish version of legendary Robin Hood, they defended villagers against oppressive landlords and tax collectors, and often redistributed wealth taken from the rich. For this reason, they were seen as a valiant, brave, assertive people who stood against injustice. They had a hierarchical social structure. in which the leader was called the efe, while his armed companions were known as kızan.

From the 19th century onward, the Zeybeks were deployed as irregular troops of the Ottoman army due to their mountain skills, ambush tactics, and mastery of light weapons. They suppressed the uprisings in the Balkans, and fought in major conflicts such as the Russo-Turkish War of 1828-29, the Crimean War, and the Russo-Turkish War of 1877-78, where they earned recognition for their military skills and outstanding service on the fronts. In World War 1, as part of the Turkish War of Independence, they once again served as irregulars, and became the core striking of the Kuva-yi Milliye. Leaders such as Yörük Ali Efe, Çerkes Ethem, Atçalı Kel Mehmet Efe, Çakırcalı Mehmet Efe, and others led successful guerrilla campaigns against the Greek occupation before the establishment of the Turkish National Movement. Through these struggles, the Zeybeks became the national heroes of the independence movement.

In Asianic Elements in Greek Civilization in 1927, Sir William Mitchell Ramsay describes the Zeybeks as:

A zeibek is, or used to be, a dashing young Turk of the mountain country fringing the Maeander valley, dressed in an exaggerated native style, with an armoury of lethal weapons displayed on his person and in his hands or waistbelt. His belt was about two feet deep, and his trousers about a foot long, reaching from well below the waist to the middle of the thigh, while the rest of his person was enveloped in a shirt, a very short sort of waistcoat with sleeves hanging loose from the shoulders for any other purpose than to surround his arms (which he would have scorned almost as much as a European hat), large leggings, and exiguous socks, or shoes without socks. He was a very decent fellow, indulging occasionally in a little brigandage more for ostentation than profit, but an “honourable gentleman,” and quite a “superior person" in Scottish phraseology.

=== Popularization of Zeybek ===
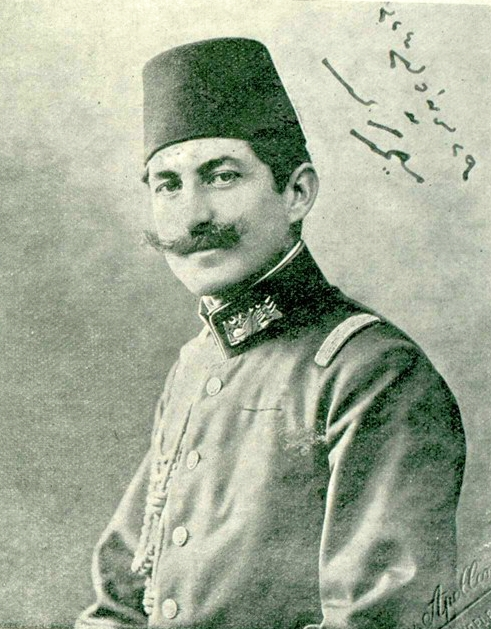
Selim Sırrı Tarcan, 1908

Selim Sırrı Tarcan (1874–1956) was an educator, sports official and politician who was best known for establishing the Turkish National Olympic Committee, and for being one of the earliest researchers of Turkish folk dances, including Zeybek. During his service in Izmir as a young officer in 1896, he had the opportunity to meet the Zeybeks. In his memoirs, he describes his years of service in Izmir as following:

In 1313 (1895), the Greeks revolted against us. At that time, I had just graduated from school as an officer and was assigned to İzmir. Recruitment was happening everywhere. The enlisted soldiers from Manisa, Aydın, and Denizli poured into İzmir in waves. All of these soldiers were Zeybeks, as large as pine trees. They set up their encampments at Yeni Kale and Kadife Kale, training during the day and dancing the Zeybek with torches at night. It was then that I witnessed these dances and became deeply fascinated by them. After the war, I remained in beautiful İzmir for four years. Whenever I had the chance, I would arrange for the Efe to dance with the guidance of the notables in Aydın, Denizli, Manisa, and Akhisar, and I would try to imitate them by joining. Since leaving İzmir, I never again had such an opportunity to practice the Zeybek dance.

In 1909, he was sent to Sweden by the Ministry of War to specialize in physical education and sports. During his time in Sweden, he had the opportunity to examine many social and cultural aspects, including Swedish folk culture and dance, which led him to become interested in folklore and reviving Turkish folk dances.

Upon his return to the Ottoman Empire, he traveled to many Anatolian provinces and compiled over a hundred dances and songs of the Zeybeks. In 1916, he created his own Zeybek dance in an adaptation of the well-known song of the province Aydın "Sarı Zeybek", with a new approach of women dancing alonside men. Having completed his work, he incorporated the dance into school programs, public performances, and cultural events, helping to preserve its traditional elements while presenting it to wider audiences. The dance has also caught the interest of Mustafa Kemal Ataturk in 1925 at a ceremony in Izmir, which led Tarcan to include the new Zeybek in his compilation of the Zeybek dances. Through his efforts, Zeybek transitioned from a regional folk dance to a symbol of national pride, gaining recognition across Turkey.

== Variations ==
Zeybek dances are divided into two main categories based on tempo and performance:

1. Ağır Zeybek (Slow Zeybek):

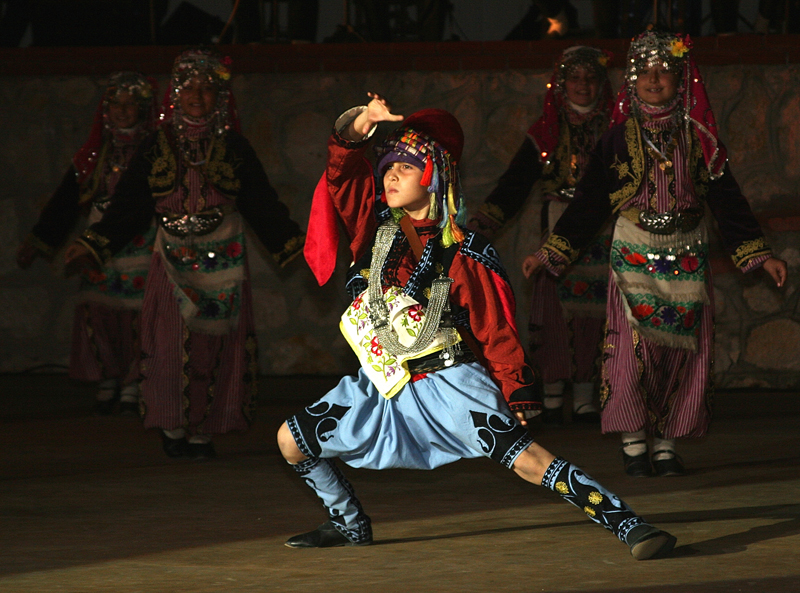
Zeybek dance from the Aegean Region

The Ağır Zeybek is a solemn and majestic form traditionally performed mainly in the İzmir, Aydın, Kütahya, Muğla, Manisa, and Afyon provinces. It is danced by a single performer or a small group standing in a semicircle formation before beginning the choreography. The lead dancer, often the most respected or experienced participant known as the efe, initiates the performance with slow, dignified movements called gezinleme ("promenade"), symbolizing self-assurance, heroism, and pride. Set in 9/2 or 9/4 rhythmic patterns, the Ağır Zeybek unfolds with expansive arm gestures, deep knee bends, and pauses that convey introspection and authority. These dances are accompanied by davul and zurna, or in some regions by the bağlama.

2. Kıvrak Zeybek (Fast Zeybek)

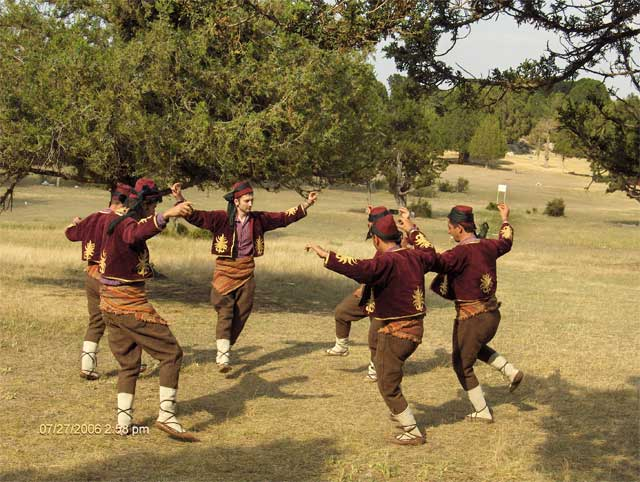
Zeybek dance from the Teke Region

The Kıvrak Zeybek is a lively and agile form performed predominantly in Antalya, Burdur, Isparta, Mersin, Uşak, and Denizli provinces, as well as in parts of Muğla and Manisa. Distinguished by its faster tempo in 9/8 or 9/16 rhythms, it features energetic leaps, quick knee bends, shoulder shakes, and dynamic turns. Unlike the solemn and measured Ağır Zeybek, the Kıvrak type emphasizes rhythmic precision and improvisational flair, often danced collectively rather than solo. The music, performed with davul and zurna or regional instruments such as the kabak kemane, accompanies playful interjections and spontaneous vocal calls (nara), giving the dance a spirited and festive character deeply rooted in the Teke and inner Aegean regions.

=== Regional Varieties ===
There are over 150 regional variations of the Zeybek dance, traditionally performed across the Aegean, Western Mediterranean, and parts of Central, Marmara and Western Black Sea regions of Turkey.

==== Aydın ====
Aydın is regarded as the heartland of the Zeybek dance, where ağır styles dominate.

- Abalı Zeybeği
- Abdal Havası Zeybeği
- Ağır Milas Zeybeği
- Ataköy Zeybeği
- Aydın Zeybeği
- Bağarası İki Parmak Zeybeği
- Bozdoğan Serenler Zeybeği
- Çakal Çökerten Zeybeği
- Çaktım Çaktım Yanmadı Zeybeği
- Çine İki Parmak Zeybeği
- Elifoğlu Zeybeği
- Tekeler Köyü Zeybeği
- Kocaarap Zeybeği
- Kuruoğlu Zeybeği

==== İzmir ====
- Abacılar İnişi Zeybeği
- Armutlu Bom Zeybeği
- Arpazlı Zeybeği
- Bademliye Efem Zeybeği
- Bakırlı Zeybeği
- Baylan Cemile Zeybeği
- Baylan Nazmiye Zeybeği
- Bergama Zeybeği
- Bilal Oğlan Zeybeği
- Cumaovası İnce Mehmet Zeybeği
- Cumaovası Soğukkuyu Zeybeği
- Cumaovası İki Parmak Zeybeği
- Cumaovası Yörük Ali Zeybeği
- Çandarlı Zeybeği
- Çatal Çamın Dalları Zeybeği
- Çekirdeksiz Bağlarım Zeybeği
- Çift Hava Zeybeği
- Dağcılar Zeybeği
- Dağlı Zeybeği
- Duvar Üstünde Durdum Zeybeği
- Eğridere Zeybeği
- Entarisi Mavili Zeybeği
- Ey Yüceler Zeybeği
- Feraye Zeybeği
- Göllüce İki Parmak Zeybeği
- Gündoğdu Zeybeği
- Hacı Ahmet Zeybeği
- Hazeli Zeybeği
- Hürmüz Zeybeği
- İskender Boğazı Zeybeği
- Kaba Hava Zeybeği
- Karanfil Yalakları Zeybeği
- Kasnak Zeybeği
- Kavakta Kuru Dal Var Zeybeği
- Kazmir Zeybeği
- Koca Solak Zeybeği
- Koca Ümmet Zeybeği
- Kordon Zeybeği
- Koroğlu Zeybeği
- Kostak Ali Zeybeği
- Koyundere Zeybeği
- Mecide Bak Mecide Zeybeği
- Mehmet Efe Zeybeği
- Mendilimin Ucuna (Sakız) Zeybeği
- Mor Menekşe Zeybeği
- Nacakoğlu Zeybeği
- Ötme Bülbül Zeybeği
- Sabahın Seher Vakti Zeybeği
- Sandık Üstünde Sandık Zeybeği
- Sebai Zeybeği
- Süslü Jandarma Zeybeği
- Üçkemerin Dibeği Zeybeği
- Yalabık Zeybeği
- Yağcılar Zeybeği
- Yeşil Giy Yeşil Kuşan Zeybeği
- Yün Entari Zeybeği
- Zahide Zeybeği

==== Manisa ====
- Ağır Cihan Yandı Zeybeği
- Ateş Attım Samana (Gımıldan) Zeybeği
- Albayrak Zeybeği
- Asmalı Kuyu Zeybeği
- Bursa Damları Zeybeği
- Cihan Yandı Zeybeği
- Cirit Zeybeği
- Çakır Ayşe Zeybeği
- Çift Hava Zeybeği
- Değirmen Çakılı Zeybeği
- Derelerin Söğüdü Zeybeği
- Edremit Güvende Zeybeği
- Gül Yarim Zeybeği
- Haydar Zeybeği
- Haymana Zeybeği
- İsmailli Zeybeği
- Kabartan Zeybeği
- Karagöze Baktıran Zeybeği
- Karanfilli Zeybeği
- Kız Bayıltan Zeybeği
- Kız Havası Zeybeği
- Konsol Üstünde Mumlar Zeybeği
- Korucu Havası Zeybeği
- Nalbandım Zeybeği
- Oduncular Zeybeği
- On Yedi Benli Zeybeği
- Payama Bak Payama Zeybeği
- Sabah Güvende Zeybeği
- Sakarkaya Zeybeği
- Sarıçalı Zeybeği
- Sarıkaya Zeybeği
- Somalı Zeybeği
- Turgutlu İki Parmak Zeybeği
- Üç Parmak Zeybeği
- Yandım Ayşem Zeybeği
- Yörük Güvende Zeybeği
- Yunt Dağı Dağlı Zeybeği

== Costume ==
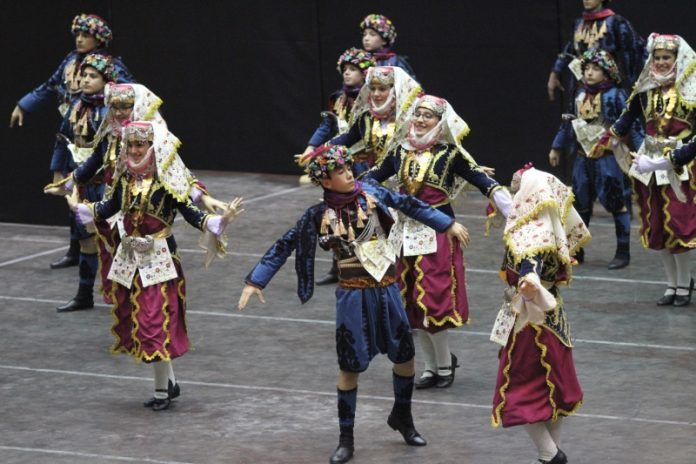
Zeybek dancers in traditional costumes

The male Zeybek costume is adapted from the historical traditional clothing of the Zeybeks. While variations exist between provinces, it typically includes a small fez hat or a turban-like headpiece called akavuk, decorated with flowers or a cloth, a white, loose-fitting shirt (gömlek), and an embroidered vest (yelek) worn over the shirt. A long, colorful, and decorated wide sash known as kuşak is wrapped around the waist, used to hold pistols or yatagan knives. The ensemble also includes short, baggy trousers with patterned sides (şalvar), adorned long socks, and black boots (çizme).

Female Zeybek costumes were historically less common, as the Zeybek dance was primarily performed by men. However, women’s versions have emerged in modern performances. These typically feature a floral headpiece covered with a sequined headscarf, with gold jewelry adorning the forehead, a light-colored embroidered blouse (gömlek), and an üçetek entari, an Ottoman robe. A fitted velvet jacket (cepken) is worn over the blouse, accompanised by a decorated grey belt buckle, and elegant şalvar trousers beneath the robe. Soft leather shoes in black with white long socks complete the costume.

== See also ==
- Afshar
- List of dances
- List of dances sorted by ethnicity
- Music of Turkey
- Zeibekiko, Greek analog
