= Zeybek =

Zeybek or Zeibek may refer to:

- Zeybeks, irregular militia and guerrilla fighters from the Aegean Region of Turkey during the War of Independence
- Zeybek (dance), a Turkish folk dance from West Anatolia
- Zeibekiko, a Greek folk dance

== People with the surname ==
- Halil Zeybek (born 1985), Turkish footballer
