= Atça railway station =

ATÇA
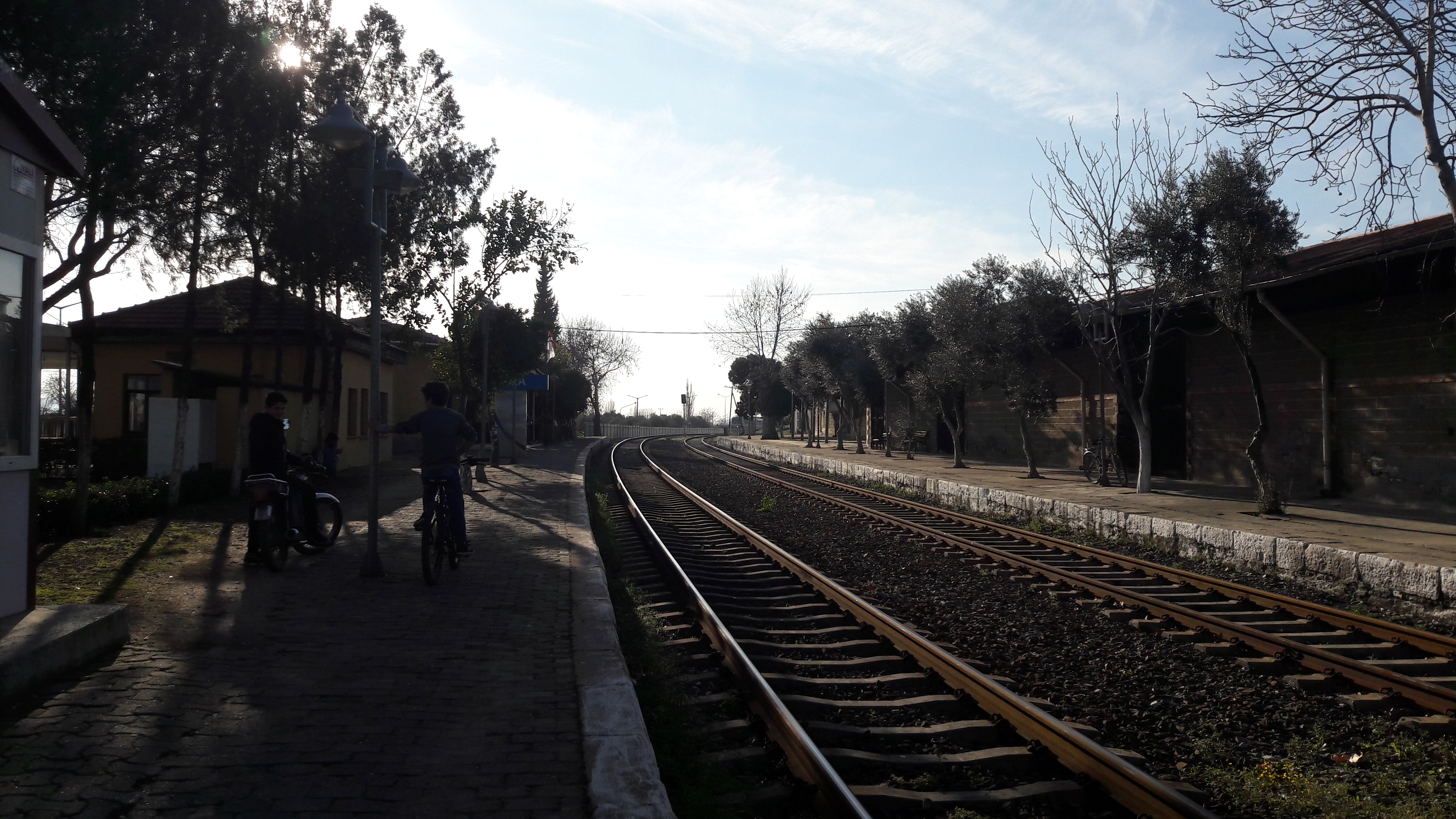

General information
- Location: Atça Mah. 09470; Sultanhisar, Aydın; Turkey
- Coordinates: 37.883611°N 28.21277°E
- System: TCDD Taşımacılık regional rail station
- Owner: Turkish State Railways
- Line: İzmir–Denizli İzmir–Nazilli Söke–Denizli Söke–Nazilli
- Platforms: 2 side platforms
- Tracks: 2
- Connections: Aydın Municipal Bus: 302

Construction
- Structure type: At-grade

History
- Opened: 1881

Services
Preceding station	TCDD Taşımacılık	Following station
Sultanhisar towards İzmir (Basmane)	İzmir–Denizli	Isabeyli towards Denizli
Sultanhisar towards İzmir (Basmane)	İzmir–Nazilli	Isabeyli towards Nazilli
Sultanhisar towards Söke	Söke–Denizli	Isabeyli towards Denizli
Sultanhisar towards Söke	Söke–Nazilli	Isabeyli towards Nazilli
Location

Atça railway station (Turkish: Atça istasyonu) is a railway station in Atça, Turkey. It is located in the southwest of the town, on the north side of the D.320 state highway. TCDD Taşımacılık operates regional train service from İzmir or Söke to Denizli. Atça station was originally opened in 1881, by the Ottoman Railway Company, as part of the extension of their railway from Aydın.

== Connections ==
The Aydın Metropolitan Municipality operates regional bus service on the D.320.

ESHOT Bus service
Route number	Stop	Route	Location
302	Atça	Aydın Devlet Üniversitesi — Nazilli	Denizli-Aydın highway
