= Güvendik =

Güvendik can refer to:

- Güvendik, Sultanhisar
- Güvendik, Sungurlu
- Güvendik, Taşova
- Güvəndik
