= Yörük Ali Efe =

Turkish guerrilla leader

Yörük Ali Efe (1886 – 23 September 1951) was a Turkish guerrilla leader in the Ottoman Empire, and an officer in the Turkish Army during the Turkish War of Independence. He was an important leader in Kuva-yi Milliye of the Aegean Region. After the declaration of republic he resigned from his office and worked as a farmer and industrialist. He was one of the last Zeybeks in Turkish history.

== Early years ==
Ali was born in Kavaklı, a village near Sultanhisar in Aydın, in 1886. His father, İbrahimoğlu Abdi, belonged to the Sarıtekeli clan, and his mother Fatma, to the Atmaca clan, both Yörük clans. His father died when he was an infant. During his childhood, he was influenced by Atçalı Kel Mehmet Efe and wanted to become a Zeybek. In 1916, he was recruited into the Ottoman Army and participated in the Caucasus Campaign. Due to the inefficient leadership, he deserted the army after the disastrous Battle of Sarikamish, and returned to his village.

== On the mountains ==
Yörük Ali joined a Zeybek group under the command of Alanyalı Molla Ahmet Efe and started to live in Aydın mountains. His courage, intelligence and talent assured him increasing popularity among group members and when Alanyalı died in an ambush in Kavaklıdere near Karacasu, he took the command of his group and became an "Efe".

== Fighting for independence ==
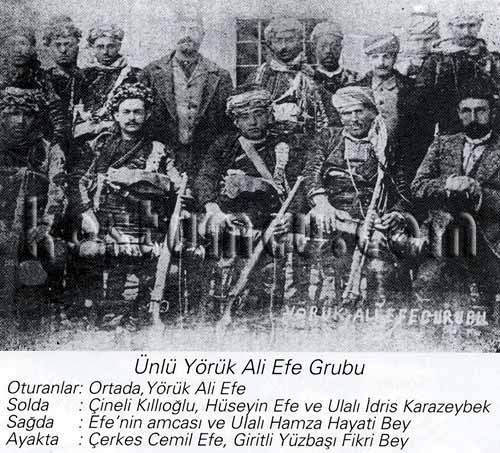
Group of Yoruk Ali Efe during Battle of Aydın

On 15 May 1919, Greek forces captured İzmir and immediately set out to occupy a larger territory in Turkey's Aegean Region. Yöruk Ali organized meetings with the cooperation of other Efes in the region such as "Kıllıoğlu Hüseyin Efe" and grouped most zeybeks of Aydın region under his command. On 16 June 1919 he made a surprise attack on a Greek garrison based in Malgaç train station. The garrison was completely destroyed and ammunition and supplies were captured. This was the first victory for the Turkish side in Greco-Turkish War (1919-1922).

Following a decision made in common by all Efes of Aydın, Yörük Ali and the zeybeks under his command attacked Aydın to recapture the town. On 30 June, his militias entered the city and held it for four days. But the reinforced Greek Army re-occupied the city on 4 June. Yoruk Ali continued the guerilla warfare against the Greek Army until his forces were enrolled within the ranks of the re-organized Turkish Army.

In November 1920,Yoruk Ali Efe was assigned by the Turkish National Assembly to form a battalion under his command and was given the colonel's rank. His group voluntarily joined the Turkish Army under the appellation, "Aydın National Regiment" ("Milli Aydın Alayı"). He served as a colonel in Turkish Army throughout the Turkish War of Independence.

== Massacres and war crimes ==
During the Battle of Aydin, Yörük Ali Efe and his gang committed multiple massacres, rapes and other crimes against Greek civilians. Around 3,000 Aydın Greeks, including men, women, and children, were murdered. In addition, 800 women and children were deported to inland Anatolia.

George William Rendel, a contemporary to the Battle, reported on the massacres of Yörük Ali Efe's gang against the Greeks:

The greater part of its [Aydın's] inhabitants were killed, some being shot, others pierced with red hot irons, others cut to pieces and others put to death with the cruelest tortures. The inhabitants’ property was plundered, virgins were carried off to the mountains, and Aydin is a vast cemetery. After the destruction of Aydin 800 women and children were sent off by railway to Nazli and Denizli on June 18th and 19th 1919.

Arnold J. Toynbee refused to sugarcoat what the Turks did to Greek noncombatants: “Women and children were hunted like rats from house to house, and civilians [...] were slaughtered in batches—shot or knifed or hurled over a cliff. [...] Many of the women...were violated.”

== After the war ==
He resigned from his office soon after the declaration of the Turkish Republic and lived in İzmir for 6 years. In 1928 he moved to Yenipazar, where he lived until his death. His name became "Ali Efe Yörük" after the Surname Law, which was passed in 1934. He had lost his legs in a tragic accident in İzmir when he had fallen under a tram. He died in Bursa, where he went for medical treatment, and was buried in Yenipazar in compliance with his will.

== Legacy ==
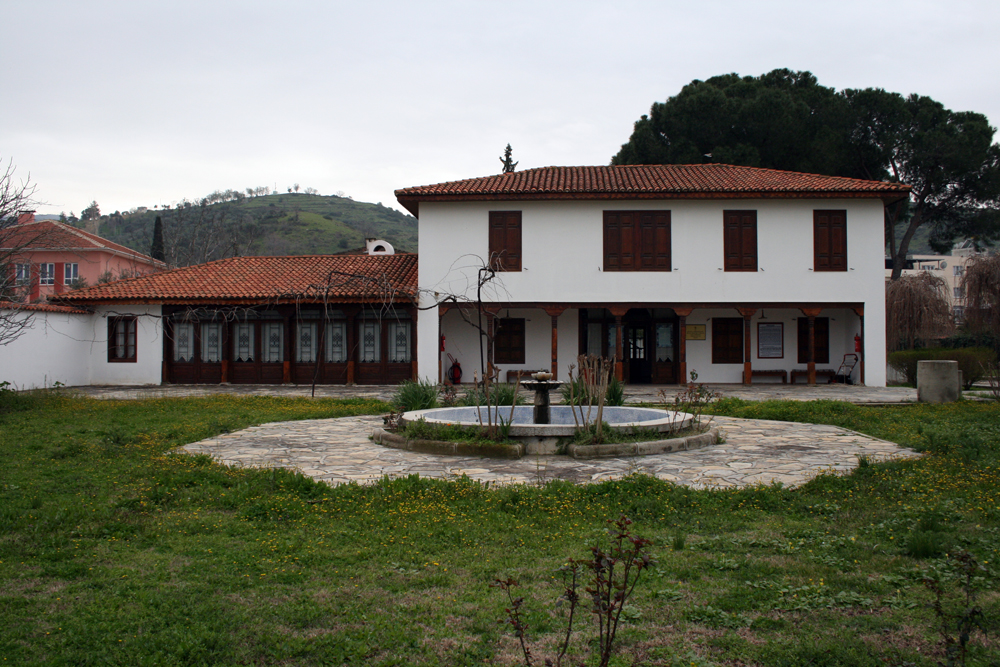
Yoruk Ali Efe Museum in Yenipazar near Aydın.

He was one of the last Zeybeks and remain as a notable Efe. His contributions to Turkish War of Independence and to the establishment of the Turkish Republic were also remarkable. He is also remembered with his generous personality and his fight for justice under all circumstances. After his death, his house in Yenipazar was converted to Yoruk Ali Efe Museum in 2001. His grave is in the garden of that museum.

== Quotes ==
- "Some people believe that Turkish War of Independence was achieved by me and with some others. This is wrong. What can be the importance of one man or five men in such a great campaign? Any patriot who loved his motherland in those days had thought in the same way as ourselves, heard what we heard and then fought with us. It is a mistake to take the Lion's share in national resistance. How can one hand give a noise?"

== Efe of all efes ==
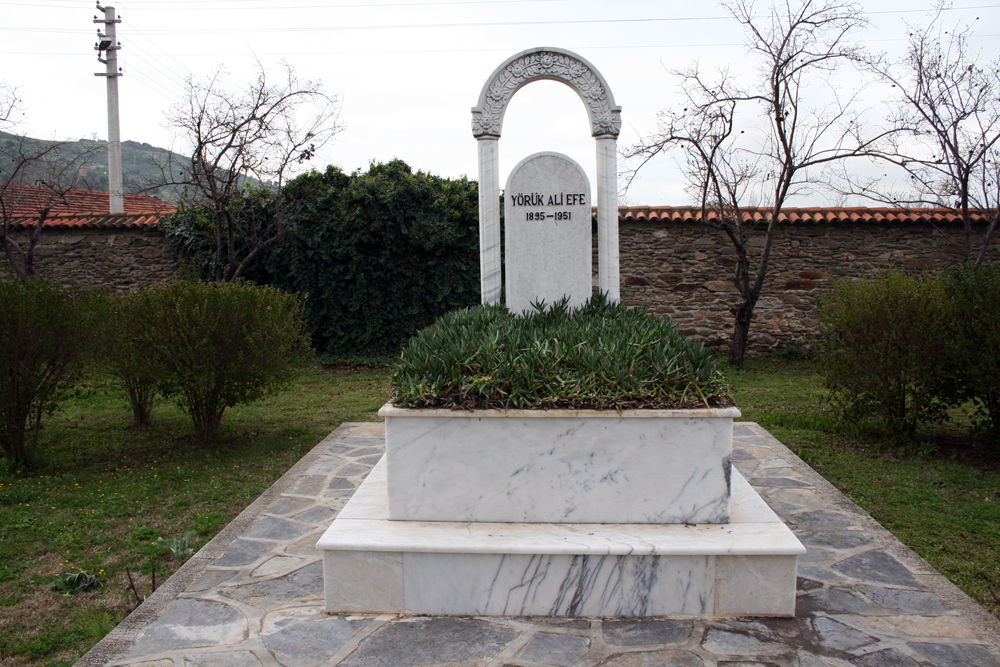
Grave of Yoruk Ali Efe

He is a hero in modern Turkish history and was given the name "Efelerin Efesi" (Efe of all Efes), whereas an Efe is already the leader of a group of zeybeks. There is a folk song (türkü) written to his honour and carries his name. The lyrics of Yörük Ali's türkü are as follows (with English translation):

Şu Dalama'dan geçtin mi,
Soğuk da sular içtin mi
Efelerin içinde
Yörük de Ali'yi seçtin mi?

Hey gidinin efesi, efesi
Efelerin efesi

Şu Dalama'nın çeşmesi
Ne hoş olur içmesi
Yörük de Ali'yi sorarsan
Efelerin seçmesi

Hey gidinin efesi efesi
Efelerin efesi

Cepkenimin kolları
Parıldıyor pulları
Yörük de Ali geliyor
Açıl Aydın yolları

Hey gidinin efesi efesi
Efelerin efesi

Translation
Have you passed from the Dalama,
Have you drank from its coldest waters,
Out of all the Efes,
Have you found Yörük Ali?

O efe's efe, the efe...
The efe of all efes

That Dalama's fountain
How sweet it is to drink from,
But if you ask about Yörük Ali,
He is the chosen efe

O efe's efe, the efe...
The efe of all efes

The sleeves of my cepken (Efe jacket),
It is shining with its little puls,
Yörük Ali is coming!
Clear all, of Aydin's roads!

O efe's efe, the efe...
The efe of all efes

== See also ==
- Atçalı Kel Mehmet Efe
- Turkish Independence War
- Yoruk
- Zeibeks

== Source ==
- Burhan, Sabahattin (1999). Ege'nin Kurtuluş Destanı Yörük Ali Efe Cilt: 1. Nesil Yayınları. ISBN 975-408-175-1
