= Zeybeks =

Irregular Ottoman militia and guerrilla fighters living in the Aegean region

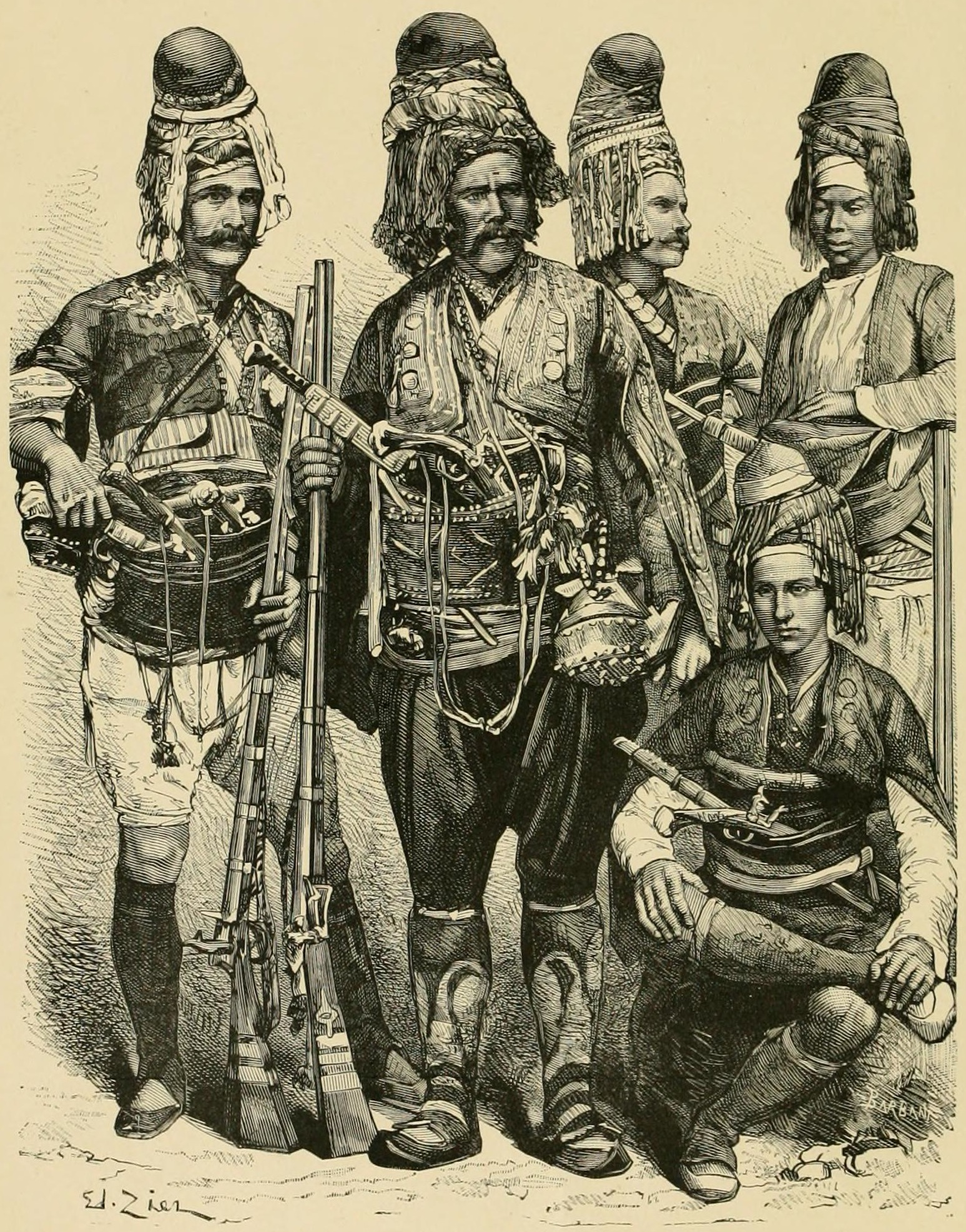
Group of Zeybeks

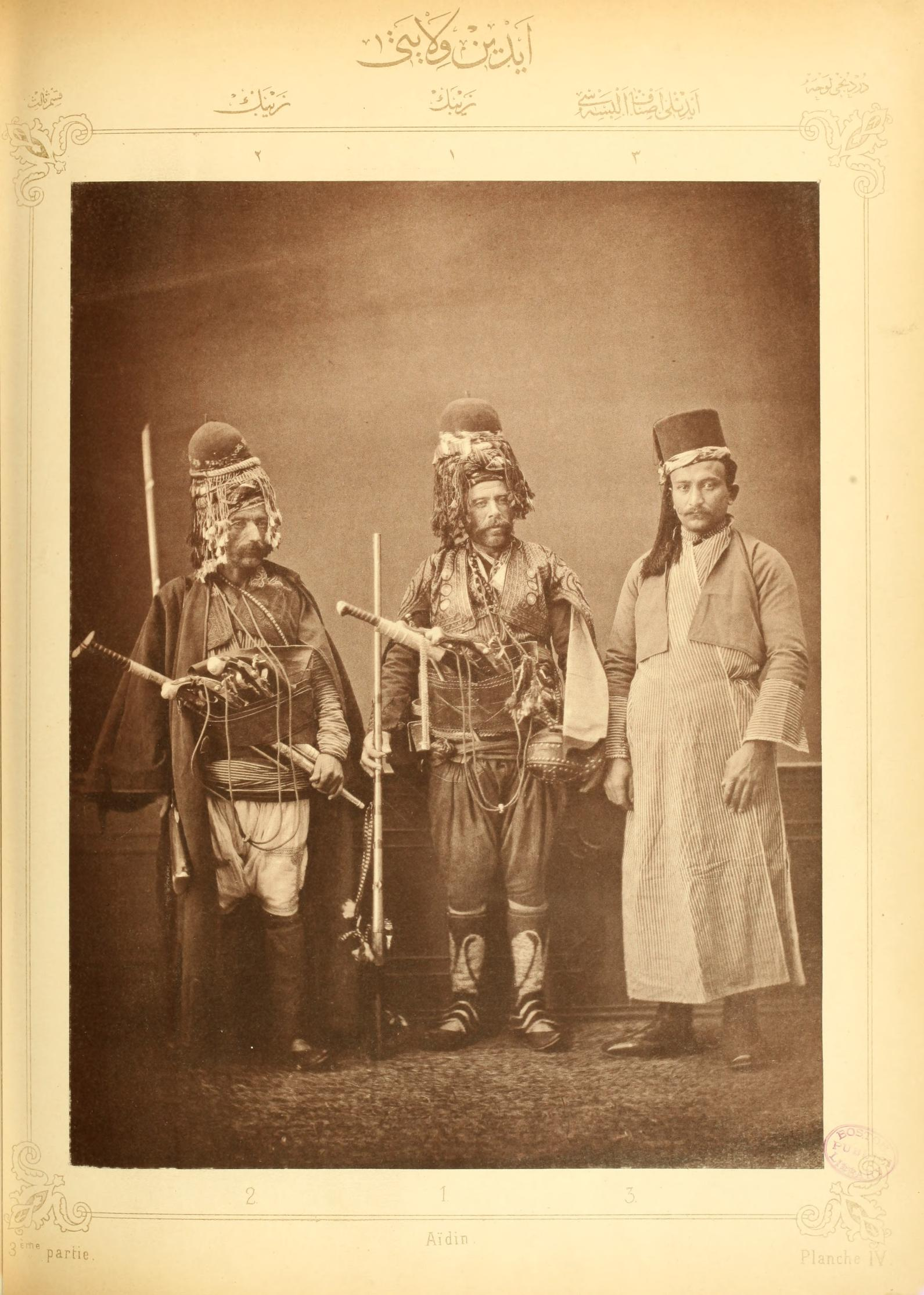
Two Zeybeks in their attire 1873 a.d.

Zeybeks, sometimes spelled as Zeibeks (Greek: Ζεϊμπέκοι or Ζεϊμπέκηδες; Ottoman Turkish: زیبك, romanized: zeybek), were Turkish irregular militia and guerrilla fighters living in West Anatolia from late 17th to early 20th centuries.

== History ==
=== Origins ===
The origins of Zeybeks are debated with most Turkish sources supporting that they are Turkic. According to Aşıkpaşazade, an Ottoman Turkish Historian from the 15th century, Zeybeks were Muslim Gazis protecting the borders in Anatolia. According to a later Turkish author the Zeybeks first appeared in the 13th century and were Turkomans who had migrated to the Aegean Region. In today's Turkish society the Zeybeks and Yörüks are seen as the same people. Many famous Zeybeks like Yörük Ali Efe and Demirci Mehmet Efe belonged to Yörük tribes.

They are also linked to the Turkmen Celali rebels in the 16th century, while a different Turkish writer claims that Zeybeks were light infantry troops made of Turkmen tribes loyal to the Seljuks, active up to the year 1308 and rather in Central Anatolia.

According to some historians, Pecheneg culture has had a great influence on Zeybek-Seymen culture. According to Islamic sources, the clothes of the paid Pecheneg soldiers under the command of Alyatte, one of the Byzantine commanders, could not be distinguished from their Zeybek-Seymen opposites, as also stated by Claude Cahen in his article titled Battle of Manzikert.

On the other hand, the Ottoman Turkish author Osman Hamdi Bey (1842–1910) supports that they were descendants of the Trallians, a Thracian tribe from the western coast of Asia Minor, and unrelated to the Turks.

However, according to other sources, mostly Greek, the Zeybeks were of Greek origin. According to the Greek historian Georgios Skalieris, writing in 1922, they were of Greek and Phrygo-Pelasgian descent.

According to a later Greek historian, Kostas B. Spanos, the Zeybeks were Greeks who migrated from Thrace and settled in the provinces of Bursa, Aydin and Sakarya. They were Islamized but not Turkified. Greek historian Thomas Korovinis, in his detailed study of the Zeybeks, summarizes seven of the main theories on their origins. These posit that the Zeybeks are the descendants of:

- Turkomans and Yörüks
- Pecheneg influenced
- Thracian Trallians
- a mixture of Greeks and Ancient Anatolians, such as Phrygians and Pelasgians
- Islamized Greeks

=== Beginnings ===
Traditionally, the Zeybeks acted as protectors of village people against landlords, bandits, and tax collectors. A leader of a Zeybek gang was called Efe and his soldiers were known as either Zeybeks or Kızan. The term "Efe" was used for the leaders of Zeybek groups, while the "Kızan" were beneath the Zeybeks. According to the Armenian-Turkish linguist Sevan Nisanyan, the origin of the term "Efe" is either of Greek (efevos, 'young man with courage') or Turkic (eğe, ece, ebe, "big brother" in old Turkic) origin.

=== Etymology of names ===
The origin of the term "Zeybek" is unclear. According to Nisanyan, it is either of Turkic or Arabic origin Some sources claim that it evolved from sübek, sü meaning "army, soldiers" and bek meaning "lord, bey" in old Turkic. According to Onur Akdogu, it evolved from saybek, meaning "strong guardian" in old Turkic. According to Paul Wittek it may have evolved from the name "Salpakis Mantachias" used by the Byzantine historian Pachymeres for Mentesh Bey, who founded the Beylik of Menteşe in southwestern Anatolia.

The term kızan, used for newly recruited or inexperienced Zeybeks, is of Turkic origin and means "boy". There was generally a tribe democracy within a group. Decisions were made in a democratic way and after the decision was made, the efe had an uncontroversial authority. They followed definite rituals for all actions; for example, the promotion of a kızan to zeybek was very similar to Ahi rituals.

=== Later development ===
From the 17th to 19th century, the Zeybeks evolved to outlaws and bandits terrorizing the Aegean Region. Before the Treaty of Lausanne and the establishment of the Republic of Turkey, larger concentrations of Zeybeks could be found on the Aegean coast of western Anatolia, near the city of İzmir (Greek: Smyrna) and in the region of Magnesia. After the Greek landing at Smyrna they fought against the Greek occupation of western Turkey.

Following the formation of a Turkish national army, during the Greco-Turkish War of 1919–1922, most of them joined the regular forces and continued their resistance. During and after the Turkish War of Independence they were no longer seen as bandits and outlaws, but as heroes, nationalist forces fighting against a foreign and non-muslim force. An English report about the Zeybeks and Yörüks states; "Those people hate the Greeks, and are known for their heroism."

== Culture ==
Zeybeks have a dance called the Zeybek dance. The Zeibekiko dance in Greece is a different and special style of Greek dance. There are different Zeybek dances in Turkey. There is the "Avşar Zeybeği" (The Afshars were an Oghuz Turkic tribe.), Aydın Zeybeği, Muğla Zeybeği, Tavas Zeybeği, Kordon Zeybeği, Bergama Zeybeği, Soma Zeybeği, Ortaklar Zeybeği, Pamukçu Zeybeği, Harmandalı Zeybeği, Sakız Zeybeği, Tefenni Zeybeği, Kadıoğlu Zeybeği, Kocaarap Zeybeği (Koca = Big, Arap = Arab), Abdal Zeybeği (Turkmen Bektashi dervishes were often called "Abdal", there was also an "Abdal" tribe belonging to the White Huns) and Bengi (Bengü meant "eternity" in old Turkic) Zeybeği.The Greek version of the dance was brought by Greeks from Izmir to Greece, which used to be called "Türkikos", but this name is not used anymore. Romantic songs about their bravery are still popular in Turkish and Greek folk music. The yatagan sword was their primary weapon, but most of them carried firearms as well.

== See also ==
- Efe, the leaders of bands of Zeybeks and Kızan
- Zeibekiko (Greek dance) and Zeybek (Turkish dance)
- Bashi Bazouk
- Atçalı Kel Mehmet
- Yörük Ali Efe
- Çakırcalı Mehmet Efe
- Hajduk

== Sources ==
- Onur Akdogu, "Bir Başkaldırı Öyküsü Zeybekler, Cilt 1 - 3 Tarihi - Ezgileri - Dansları" ("A Story of Rebellion - Zeybeks" (3 volumes: History, Music, Dances)), İzmir, Turkey, 2004 (in Turkish)
