= Atca =

ATCA or Atca may refer to:

- Advanced Telecommunications Computing Architecture, a series of specifications by the PCI Industrial Computer Manufacturers Group
- The Turkish town of Atça
- The Alien Tort Claims Act, a United States law which provides redress for violations of customary international law. Also known as the Alien Tort Statute.
- The Australia Telescope Compact Array, a radio telescope at the Paul Wild Observatory, twenty five kilometres (16 mi) west of the town of Narrabri in Australia.
