= Kuvendi =

Kuvendi may refer to:

- Assembly of the Republic of Albania (Albanian: Kuvendi i Shqipërisë)
- Assembly of Kosovo (Albanian: Kuvendi i Kosovës)
- Güvəndik, Azerbaijan
