= Efe (zeybek) =

Chiefs in the Turkish Liberation War

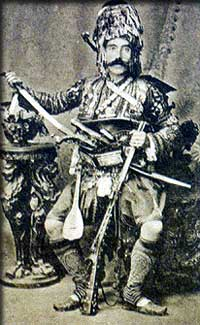
An efe in the 1880s

The Efe were the leaders of Turkish irregular soldiers, called the Zeybeks and Kızan. There are several theories about the origins of the word Efe. For Turks, Efe is a special culture. For this reason, Efe people are still respected and Zeybek dances are performed at special celebrations.

The organization of the Efe and Zeybeks was first seen in the 16th century during the Jelali revolts which dismantled power throughout the Ottoman Empire. After that time, men who rebelled against local pressures and injustices and settled in the mountains were called Efe or Zeybek. The Efe were distinctive in their attire, weapons and general appearance, which were created for survival and to best suit the life of an Efe. For example, they wore shorter trousers than were common at the time, and a yataghan with only one side with a sharpened point which was useful in mêlée combat.

After the World War I Efes were known for leading their bands of Zeybeks in guerrilla strikes against the Greek forces during the Greco-Turkish War (1919-1922), before voluntarily joining the newly formed national army in the Turkish War of Independence. After the declaration of the Republic, Efe groups were awarded with The Medallion of Independence for their participation in the war. Most Efe leaders received military ranks and pensions for their services. When they retired after the foundation of the new Turkish Republic in 1923, they resettled in the cities of western Anatolia.

The most widely known Efes are Yörük Ali Efe, Çerkes Ethem Demirci Mehmet Efe, Kıllıoğlu Hüseyin Efe, Postlu Mestan Efe, Atçalı Kel Mehmet Efe, Molla Ahmet Efe, Saçlı Efe, Gökçen Huseyin Efe, Mesutlu Mestan Efe, and Çakırcalı Mehmet Efe, and Efe Karanci.

== See also ==
- Gökçen Efe
