= Papaqçılar =

Coordinates: 40°40′N 45°35′E

Papaqçılar is a village and municipality in the Tovuz Rayon of Azerbaijan. It has a population of 1,387. The municipality consists of the villages of Papaqçılar and Güvəndik (formerly, Küvəndi).
