= Malgaçmustafa, Sultanhisar =

Malgaçmustafa
- Neighbourhood
- Location in Turkey Malgaçmustafa (Turkey Aegean)
- Coordinates: 37°57′N 28°10′E
- Country: Turkey
- Province: Aydın
- District: Sultanhisar
- Population (2022): 411
- Time zone: UTC+3 (TRT)

Malgaçmustafa is a neighbourhood in the municipality and district of Sultanhisar, Aydın Province, Turkey. Its population is 411 (2022).
