= Kurtuluş, Sultanhisar =

Village in Turkey

Kurtuluş
- Neighbourhood
- Country: Turkey
- Province: Aydın
- District: Sultanhisar
- Population (2024): 2,469
- Time zone: UTC+3 (TRT)

Kurtuluş is a neighbourhood in the municipality and district of Sultanhisar, Aydın Province, Turkey. Its population is 2,469 (2024).
