= Yağdere, Sultanhisar =

Yağdere
- Neighbourhood
- Location in Turkey Yağdere (Turkey Aegean)
- Coordinates: 37°55′N 28°12′E
- Country: Turkey
- Province: Aydın
- District: Sultanhisar
- Population (2022): 349
- Time zone: UTC+3 (TRT)

Yağdere is a neighbourhood in the municipality and district of Sultanhisar, Aydın Province, Turkey. Its population is 349 (2022).
