= Eskihisar, Sultanhisar =

Eskihisar
- Neighbourhood
- Location in Turkey Eskihisar (Turkey Aegean)
- Coordinates: 37°54′14″N 28°07′55″E
- Country: Turkey
- Province: Aydın
- District: Sultanhisar
- Population (2022): 1,129
- Time zone: UTC+3 (TRT)

Eskihisar is a neighbourhood in the municipality and district of Sultanhisar, Aydın Province, Turkey. Its population is 1,129 (2022).
