= Demirhan, Sultanhisar =

Demirhan
- Neighbourhood
- Location in Turkey Demirhan (Turkey Aegean)
- Coordinates: 37.9733°N 28.2225°E
- Country: Turkey
- Province: Aydın
- District: Sultanhisar
- Population (2022): 637
- Time zone: UTC+3 (TRT)

Demirhan is a neighbourhood in the municipality and district of Sultanhisar, Aydın Province, Turkey. Its population is 637 (2022).
