= Uzunlar, Sultanhisar =

Uzunlar
- Neighbourhood
- Location in Turkey Uzunlar (Turkey Aegean)
- Coordinates: 37.9500°N 28.2000°E
- Country: Turkey
- Province: Aydın
- District: Sultanhisar
- Population (2022): 520
- Time zone: UTC+3 (TRT)

Uzunlar is a neighbourhood in the municipality and district of Sultanhisar, Aydın Province, Turkey. Its population is 520 (2022).
