= İncealan, Sultanhisar =

İncealan
- Neighbourhood
- Location in Turkey İncealan (Turkey Aegean)
- Coordinates: 37.9500°N 28.2167°E
- Country: Turkey
- Province: Aydın
- District: Sultanhisar
- Population (2022): 678
- Time zone: UTC+3 (TRT)

İncealan is a neighbourhood in the municipality and district of Sultanhisar, Aydın Province, Turkey. Its population is 678 (2022).
