= Beşeylül, Sultanhisar =

Village in Turkey

Beşeylül
- Neighbourhood
- Country: Turkey
- Province: Aydın
- District: Sultanhisar
- Population (2024): 608
- Time zone: UTC+3 (TRT)

Beşeylül is a neighbourhood in the municipality and district of Sultanhisar, Aydın Province, Turkey. Its population is 608 (2024).
