= Malgaçemir, Sultanhisar =

Malgaçemir
- Neighbourhood
- Country: Turkey
- Province: Aydın
- District: Sultanhisar
- Population (2022): 606
- Time zone: UTC+3 (TRT)

Malgaçemir is a neighbourhood in the municipality and district of Sultanhisar, Aydın Province, Turkey. Its population is 606 (2022).
