= Kabaca, Sultanhisar =

Kabaca
- Neighbourhood
- Location in Turkey Kabaca (Turkey Aegean)
- Coordinates: 37°52′48″N 28°08′13″E
- Country: Turkey
- Province: Aydın
- District: Sultanhisar
- Population (2022): 289
- Time zone: UTC+3 (TRT)

Kabaca is a neighbourhood in the municipality and district of Sultanhisar, Aydın Province, Turkey. Its population is 289 (2022).
