= Trallians (tribe) =

Thracian tribe

The Trallians, Tralles or Tralli (Ancient Greek: Τράλλεις, romanized: Trálleis; Latin: Trallēs) were a Thracian tribe that served Hellenistic kings. They were barbarians, employed as mercenaries, executioners and torturers in Asia. Strabo (64 BC–24 AD) in Geographica attributed the foundation of the ancient city of Tralles, in the valley of the Maeander River in Asia Minor to Trallians and Argives. This tradition has been deemed fictitious and coincidental. W. M. Ramsay (1851–1939) believed that the Trallians, a warrior tribe, had crossed the Hellespont and settled Mysia, Lydia, Phrygia, Caria and Lycia, in what is today western Turkey. Livy (59 BC–17 AD) called them Illyrians, because a branch of the tribe migrated to Illyria.
