= Atçalı Kel Mehmet =

Zeybek who led a local revolt against Ottoman authority in the Aydın region

Atçalı Kel Mehmet Efe (c. 1780–1830) was a Zeybek who led a local revolt against Ottoman authority and established control of the Aydın region for a short period between 1829 and 1830 (during the reign of Mahmud II).

== Early Ages ==
Kel Mehmet was born in about 1780 to a Turkish peasant family in Atça. According to the legend, while he was an ordinary young man, he witnessed the fight between a tiny, sick dog and three healthy, powerful dogs. After being beaten for a long time, the tiny dog ends up in an alley with no exit. At that point, it fights back with his final energy and gets rid of its opponents. Inspired by the tiny dog, Mehmet established an analogy between the situation and the relation between the Ottoman reign and Anatolian peasants, and decided to go out to the mountains as an outlaw.

== Revolt ==
In 1829, Mehmet started a revolt in Kuyucak a town near Atça, demanding tax cuts, fair laws, and shorter military service. As the people were tired of the heavy tax load and endless military service from continuous wars of the declining empire, he quickly gained popularity. After he controlled Aydın, people from neighboring regions also subscribed to his authority.

Although this was a revolt against the Ottoman Empire, he stayed loyal to the Padishah. Under his rule he collected taxes in the name of the Padishah and sent the money collected to the capital. On the coins he provided, he wrote his famous quote:
"Vali-i Vilayet Hademe-i Devlet Atçalı Kel Mehmet" (meaning "Head of the Province, Servant of The State, from Atça; the Bald Mehmet").

== Death and legacy ==
The Ottoman Empire was struggling with ongoing revolts in those years. Obviously the Padishah didn't approve of Atçalı's rule, and sent his forces to regain control of Aydın. Eventually, Atçalı was killed in a combat against the Sultan's forces in 1830.

Due to his courage, he became a prominent figure in the region. He influenced many other Efe's including Yoruk Ali Efe and Demirci Mehmet Efe. There is a statue of him in Atça.

== See also ==
- Zeybek
- Efe (zeibek)
