= Güvendik, Sultanhisar =

Güvendik
- Neighbourhood
- Location in Turkey Güvendik (Turkey Aegean)
- Coordinates: 37.9167°N 28.1667°E
- Country: Turkey
- Province: Aydın
- District: Sultanhisar
- Population (2022): 60
- Time zone: UTC+3 (TRT)

Güvendik is a neighbourhood in the municipality and district of Sultanhisar, Aydın Province, Turkey. Its population is 60 (2022).
