= Kavaklı, Sultanhisar =

Kavaklı
- Neighbourhood
- Location in Turkey Kavaklı (Turkey Aegean)
- Coordinates: 37.9167°N 28.1500°E
- Country: Turkey
- Province: Aydın
- District: Sultanhisar
- Population (2022): 812
- Time zone: UTC+3 (TRT)

Kavaklı is a neighbourhood in the municipality and district of Sultanhisar, Aydın Province, Turkey. Its population is 812 (2022).
