= Atça =

- Neighbourhood
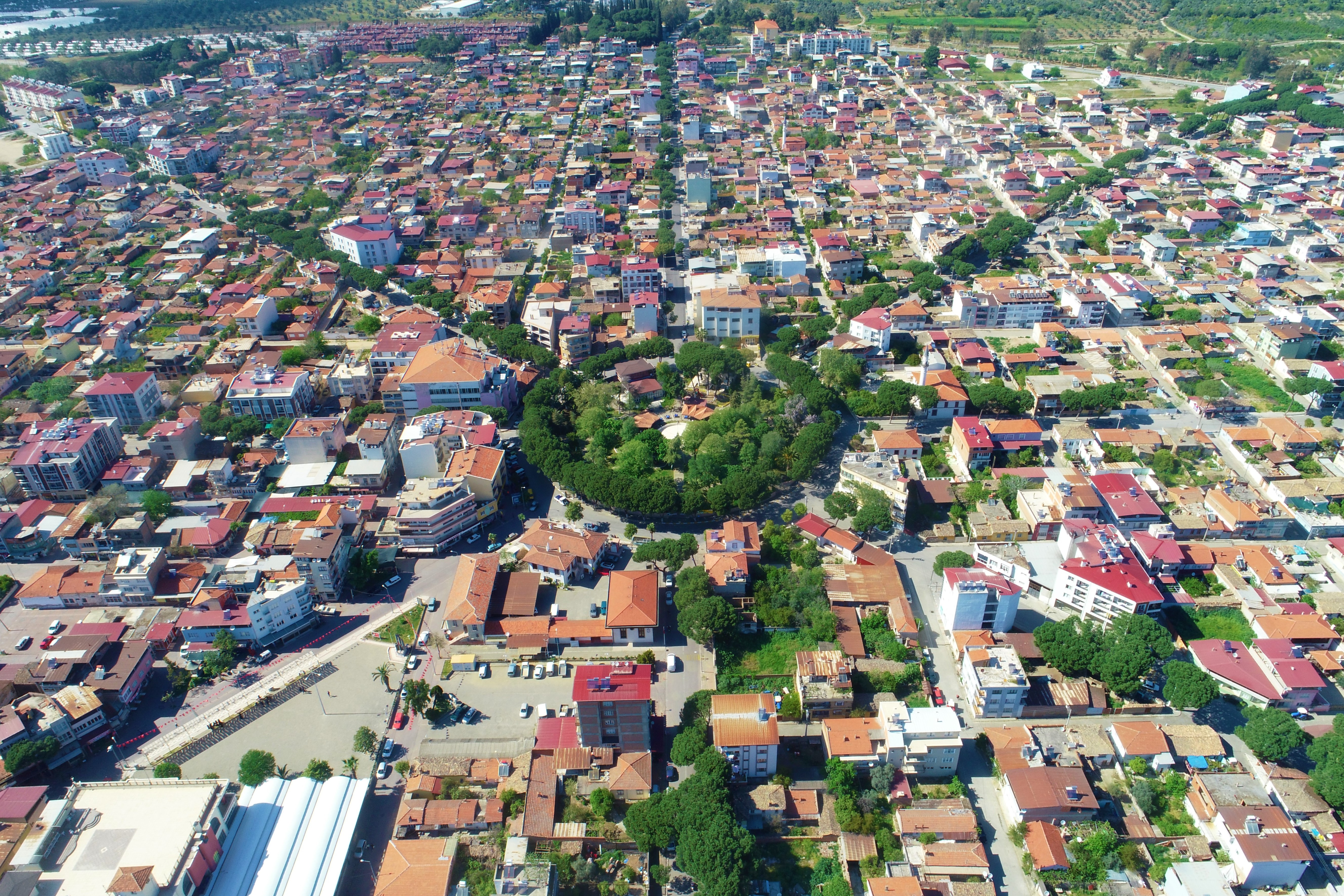

- Location within Turkey Location within Turkey Aegean
- Coordinates: 37°53′N 28°13′E
- Country: Turkey
- Province: Aydın
- District: Sultanhisar
- Elevation: 84 m (276 ft)
- Population (2022): 7,563
- Time zone: UTC+3 (TRT)
- Postal code: 09470
- Area code: 0256

Atça is a neighbourhood of the municipality and district of Sultanhisar, Aydın Province, Turkey. Its population is 7,563 (2022). Before the 2013 reorganisation, it was a town (belde).

== History ==
During the Greco-Turkish War (1919–1922), the town was destroyed by fire. It was rebuilt as a circular town, inspired by the Place de l'Étoile in Paris.

== Town twinning ==
- Makó, Hungary (since May 2008)

== See also ==
- Atçalı Kel Mehmet Efe
