= Güvəndik =

- Location within Azerbaijan
- Coordinates: 40°40′09″N 45°35′41″E
- Country: Azerbaijan
- Rayon: Tovuz
- Municipality: Papaqçılar
- Time zone: UTC+4 (AZT)
  - Summer (DST): UTC+5 (AZT)

Güvəndik (also, Küvəndi, Geyyendik, Gyuvandik, and Nizhniy Geyendik) is a village in the Tovuz Rayon of Azerbaijan. The village forms part of the municipality of Papaqçılar.
