= Yatagan =

Ottoman Turkish hewing knife/sabre

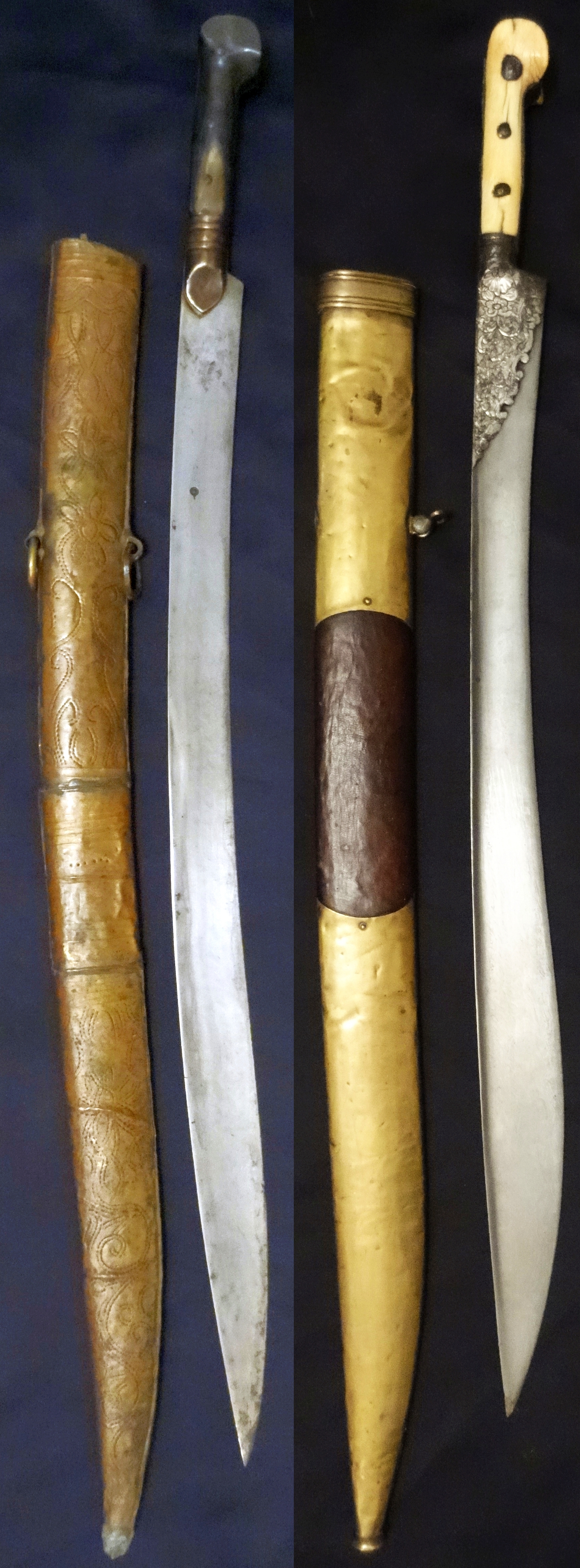
- Two Ottoman yatagans, 19th century.
- Type: Hewing knife/sabre
- Place of origin: Yatağan, Turkey

Service history
- Used by: Ottoman Empire
- Wars: Ottoman wars

Specifications
- Mass: ~0.85 kg (1.9 lb)
- Length: ~0.75 m (2 ft 6 in)
- Blade length: ~0.60 m (2 ft 0 in)
- Blade type: Single-edged, curved forward
- Hilt type: Pronged sideways towards pommel, no guard; typically made from horn, bone, or metal (silver)

The yatagan, yataghan, or ataghan (from Turkish yatağan), also called varsak,, after the Turkish Varsak tribe, is a type of Ottoman knife or short sabre used from the mid-16th to late 19th century. The yatagan was extensively used in Ottoman Turkey and in areas under immediate Ottoman influence, such as the Balkans, Caucasus, and North Africa.

== Description ==
Although weapons with features similar to yatagan were in use from the ancient times, its relation to them and its place of origin remains unknown. Robert Elgood suggests that the yatagan is not a weapon native to Central Asia or Persia and it was adopted by Ottomans through their conquests, probably in the Balkans.

The yatagan consists of a single-edged blade with a marked forward curve and a hilt formed of two grip plaques attached through the tang, the end of the hilt being shaped like large ears. The gap between the grips is covered by a metal strap, which is often decorated.

The yatagans (also called varsaks, named after the Varsak Turkomans) used by janissaries and other infantry soldiers were smaller and lighter than ordinary swords so as not to hinder them when carried at the waist on the march.

The hilt has no guard; "bolsters" of metal connect the grips to the shoulder of the blade. The grip plaques are typically made from bone, ivory, horn, or silver, and spread out in two "wings" or "ears" to either side at the pommel (a feature which prevents the hilt slipping out of the hand when used for cutting). Regional variations in the hilts have been noted: Balkan yatagans tend to have larger ears, often made of bone or ivory, whilst Anatolian yatagans characteristically have smaller ears, more often made of horn or silver, while Ionian-coast Zeibeks carried T-Hilt Yataghans. Sophisticated artwork on both the hilt and the blade can be seen on many yatagans displayed today, indicating considerable symbolic value. Having no guard, the yatagan fitted closely into the top of the scabbard; this was customarily worn thrust into a waist sash, retained by a hook. The blade may have the Seal of Solomon motif pressed into the blade. Other popular imprints include the maker's signature symbol or a text from the Quran.

Istanbul, Foça, and Prizren were the main centers of yatagan production in the Ottoman Empire.

== Gallery ==
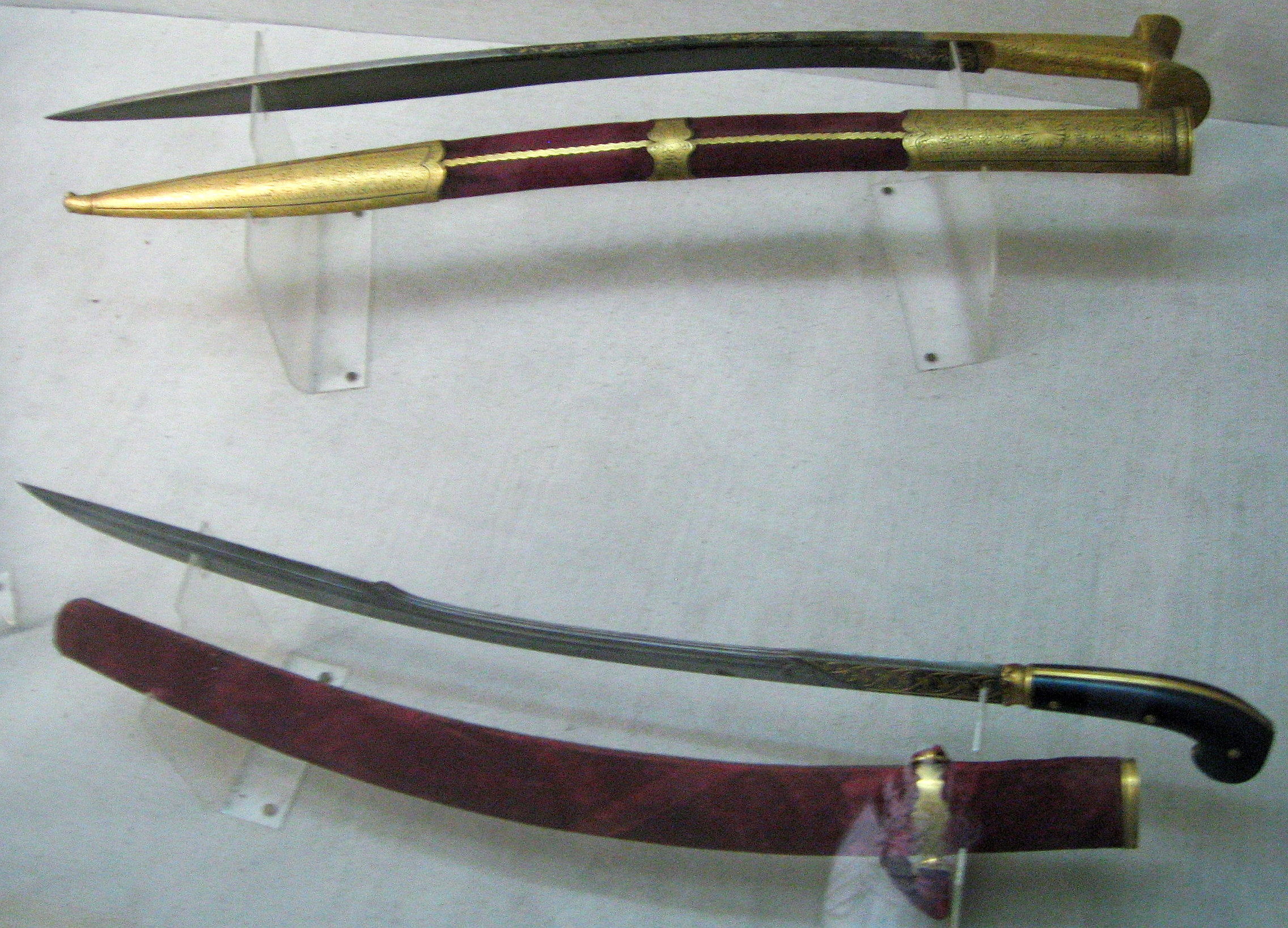
Yataghan (on top) and kilij from Topkapı Palace Museum Imperial Armoury

The Fencing Lesson by Paja Jovanović

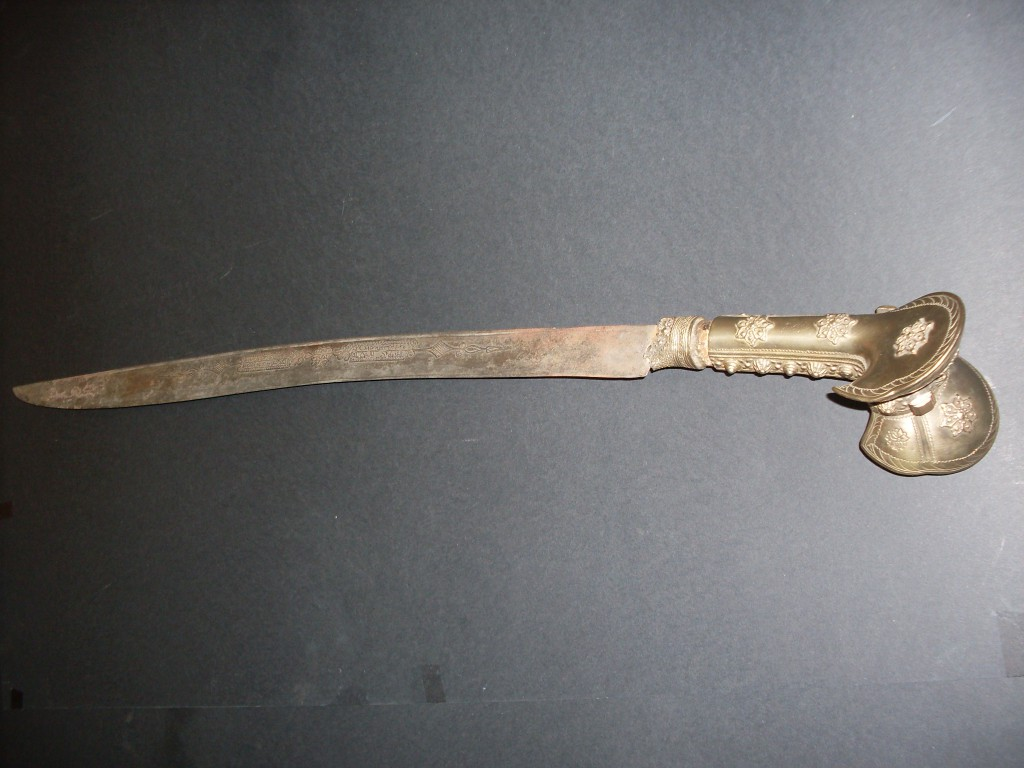
A yatagan held in Aleksinac Museum

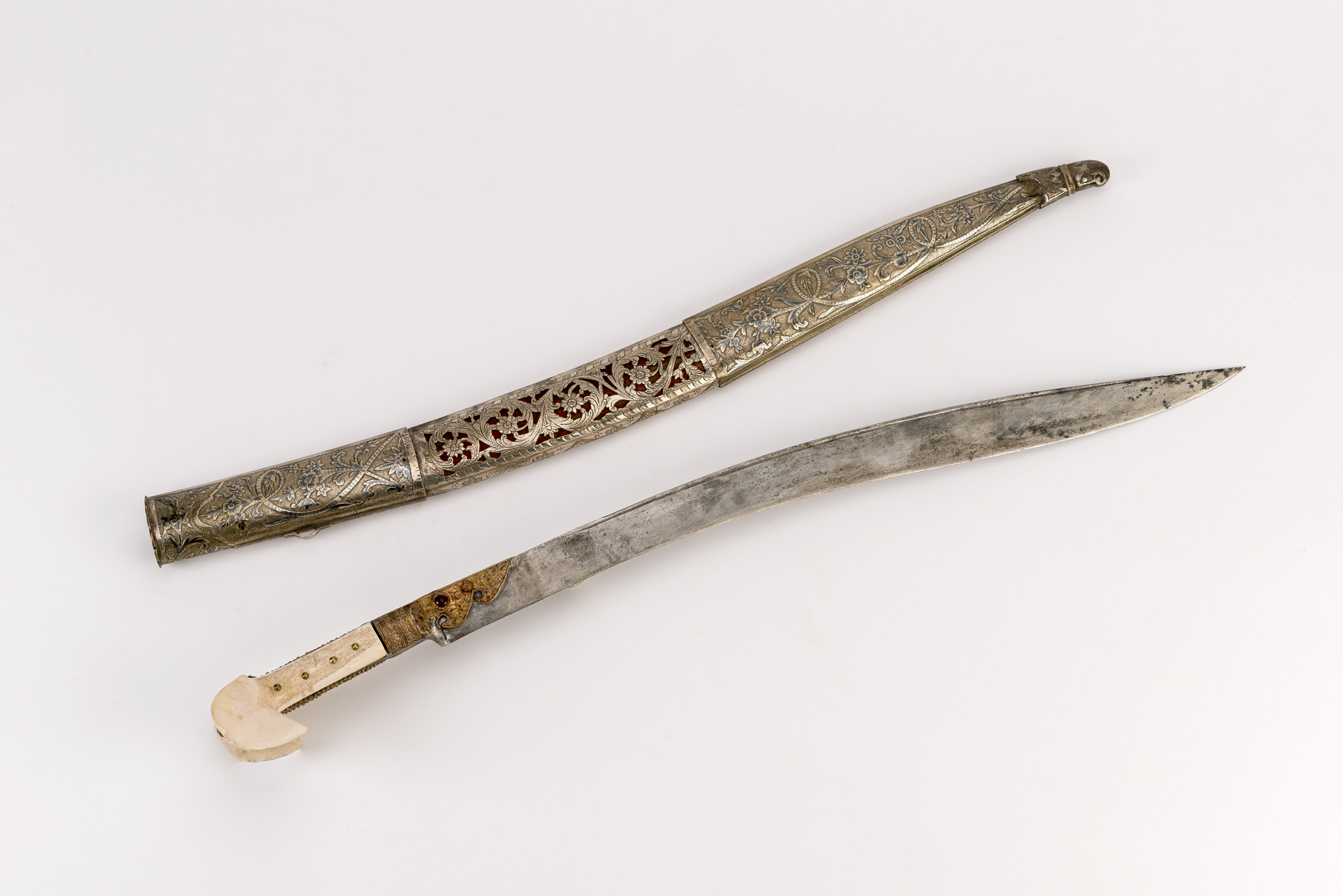
Yatagan with white bone handle and silver-plated wooden case from Athens War Museum

== See also ==
- Épée
- Cutlass
- Shashka
