= Sultanhisar =

- District and municipality
- Map showing Sultanhisar District in Aydın Province

- Location in Turkey Sultanhisar (Turkey Aegean)
- Coordinates: 37°53′23″N 28°09′27″E
- Country: Turkey
- Province: Aydın

Government
  - Mayor: Osman Yıldırımkaya (AKP)
- Area: 220 km^{2} (85 sq mi)
- Population (2022): 20,230
  - Density: 92/km^{2} (240/sq mi)
- Time zone: UTC+3 (TRT)
- Postal code: 09470
- Area code: 0256
- Website: www.sultanhisar.bel.tr

Sultanhisar is a municipality and district of Aydın Province, Turkey. Its area is 220 km^{2}, and its population is 20,230 (2022). It is 30 km east of the city of Aydın on the road to Denizli.

== History ==
The first settlement here was the ancient city of Nysa in Asia (on the Maeander), founded in the Hellenistic period and continuing to thrive under the Ancient Romans, also as bishopric, where the geographer Strabo was educated. Nysa is 3 km from the modern town of Sultanhisar, which was founded by the Seljuk Turks in 1270 and brought into the Ottoman Empire in 1425.

== Geography and economy ==
Sultanhisar is an agricultural district in the Büyük Menderes valley. The main products of the area are typical of the Aegean region: olives, figs, citrus fruits, grapes, strawberries etc. and the local industry is the processing of these products: olive oil pressing, spinning cotton, preparing and packing fruit, especially figs. Sultanhisar itself is a small town of 6,000 people on the İzmir-Afyon railway line. The local cuisine features typical Aegean dishes such as the bread-pancakes called gözleme. The town has a horticultural school of Adnan Menderes University.

Atça is a well-planned and tidy town, with 7,600 people larger than Sultanhisar itself. One of Turkey's largest strawberry growing districts. There is an annual strawberry harvest festival.

== Composition ==
There are 18 neighbourhoods in Sultanhisar District:

- Atça
- Beşeylül
- Demirhan
- Eskihisar
- Güvendik
- Hisar
- İncealan
- Kabaca
- Kavaklı
- Kılavuzlar
- Kurtuluş
- Malgaçemir
- Malgaçmustafa
- Rekmez
- Salavatlı
- Uzunlar
- Yağdere
- Zafer

== Places of interest ==
- Nysa on the Maeander - ruins of the ancient Carian city, including a large theatre, bridges (Nysa Bridge), baths and a gymnasium. The site is still being excavated, led by Professor Vedat Idil of Ankara University.

== Sources and external links ==
- District governor's official website
- archaeology in Nysa (in Turkish)
