= Aegean region =

Region of Turkey

Coordinates: 38°00′N 29°00′E

Aegean Region Ege Bölgesi
- Region
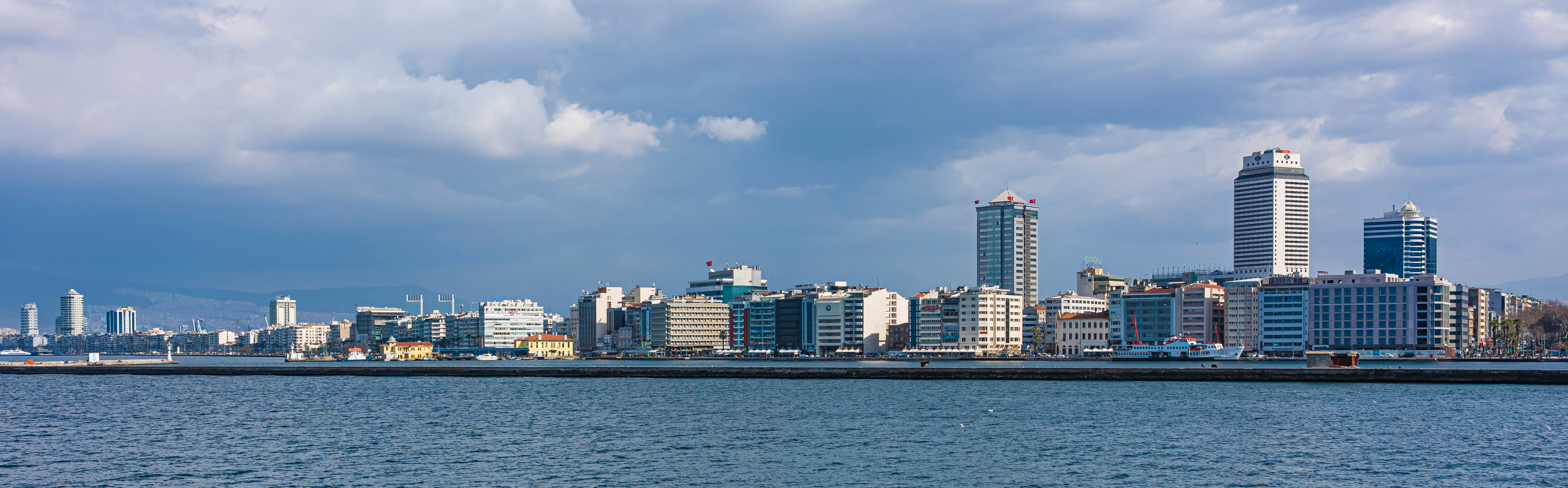
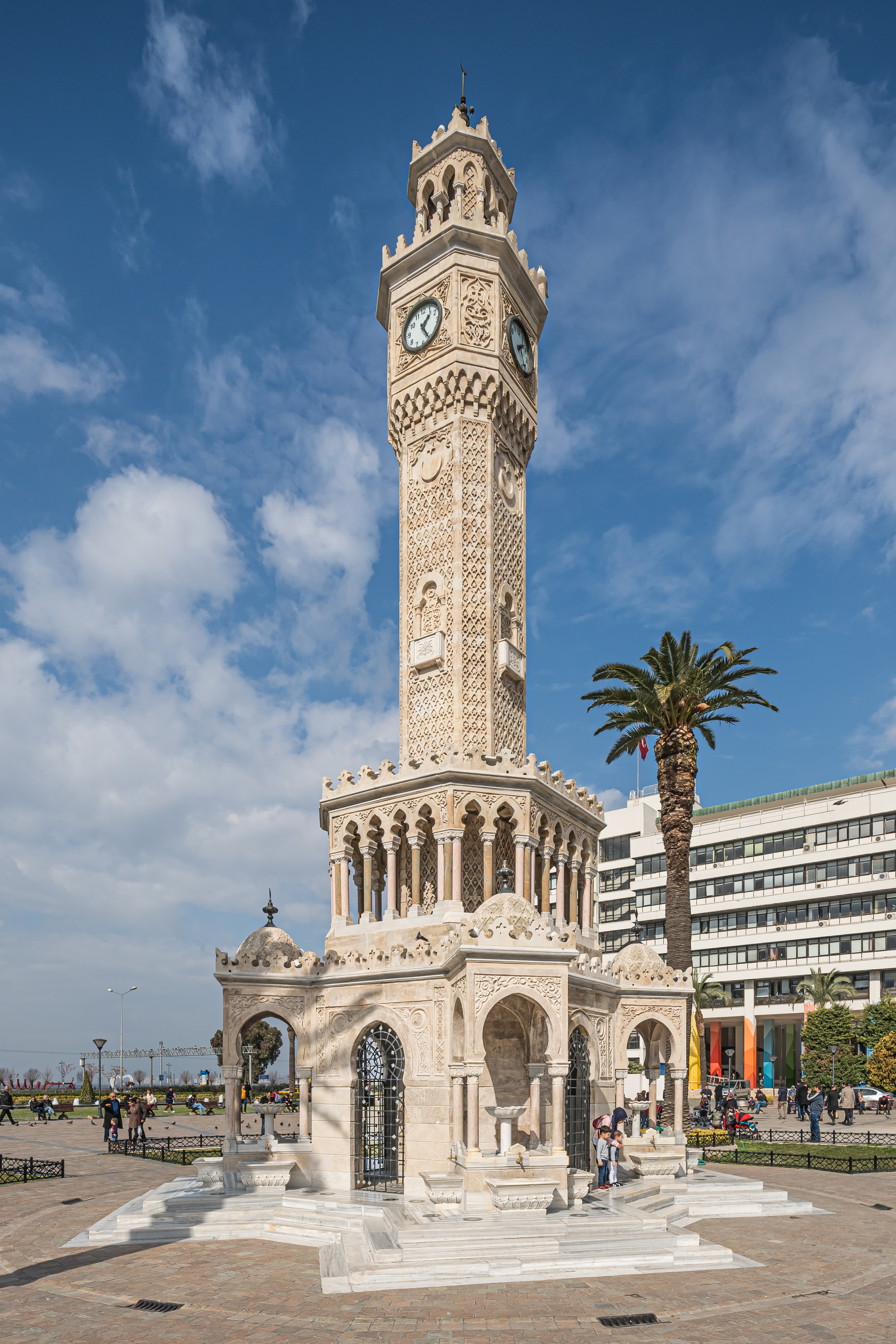
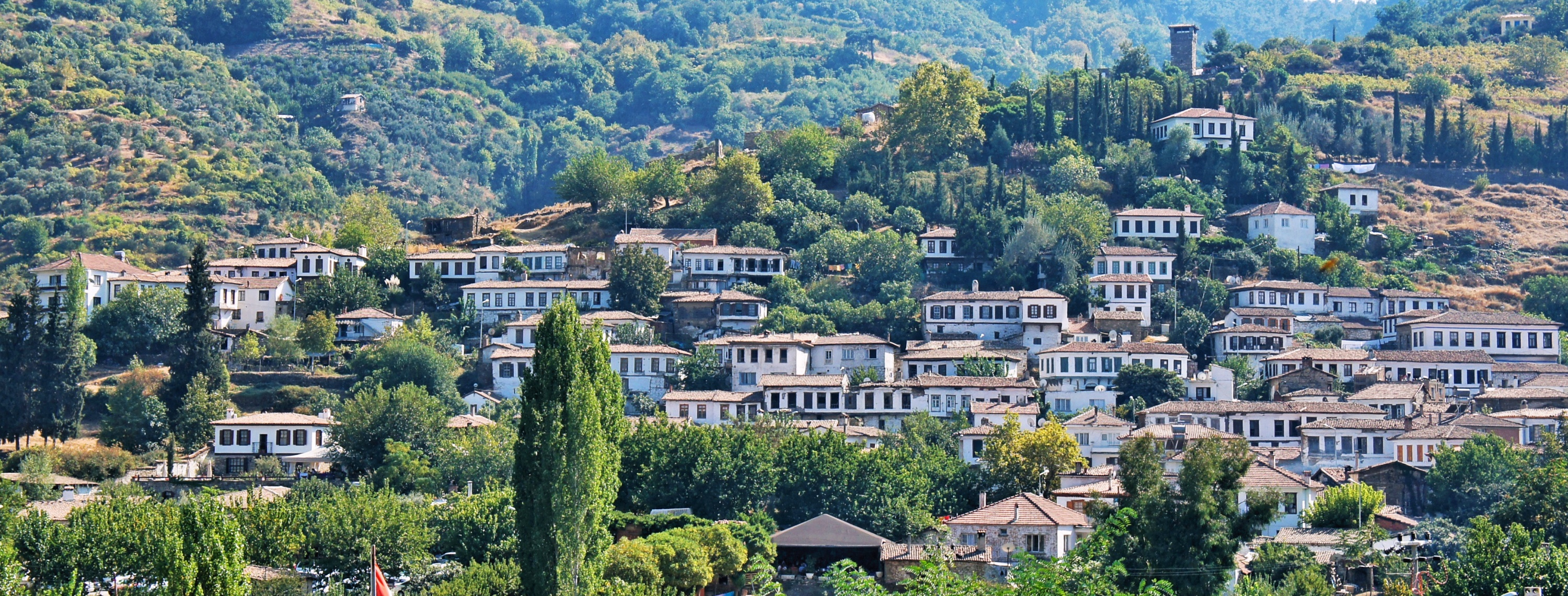
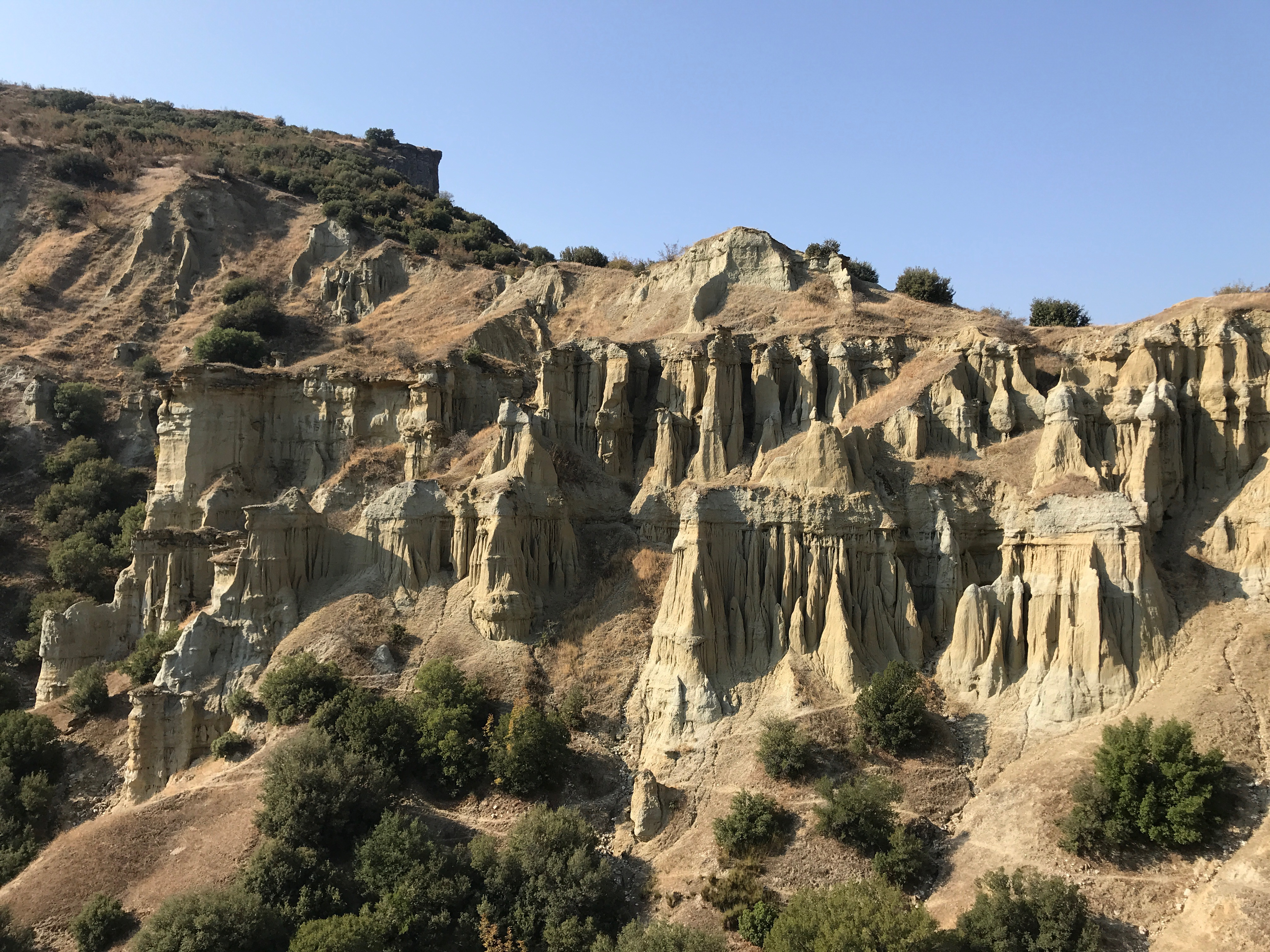
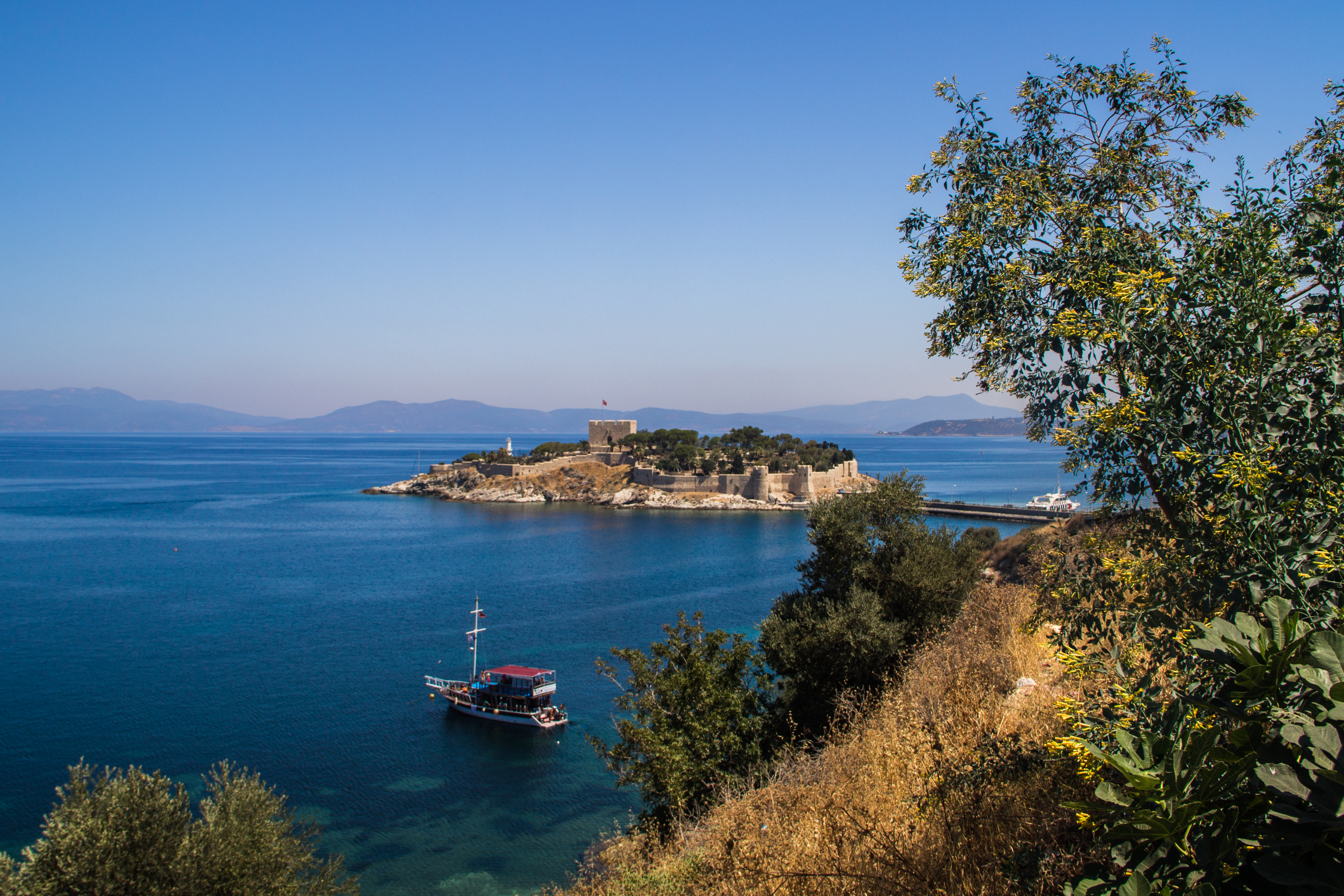
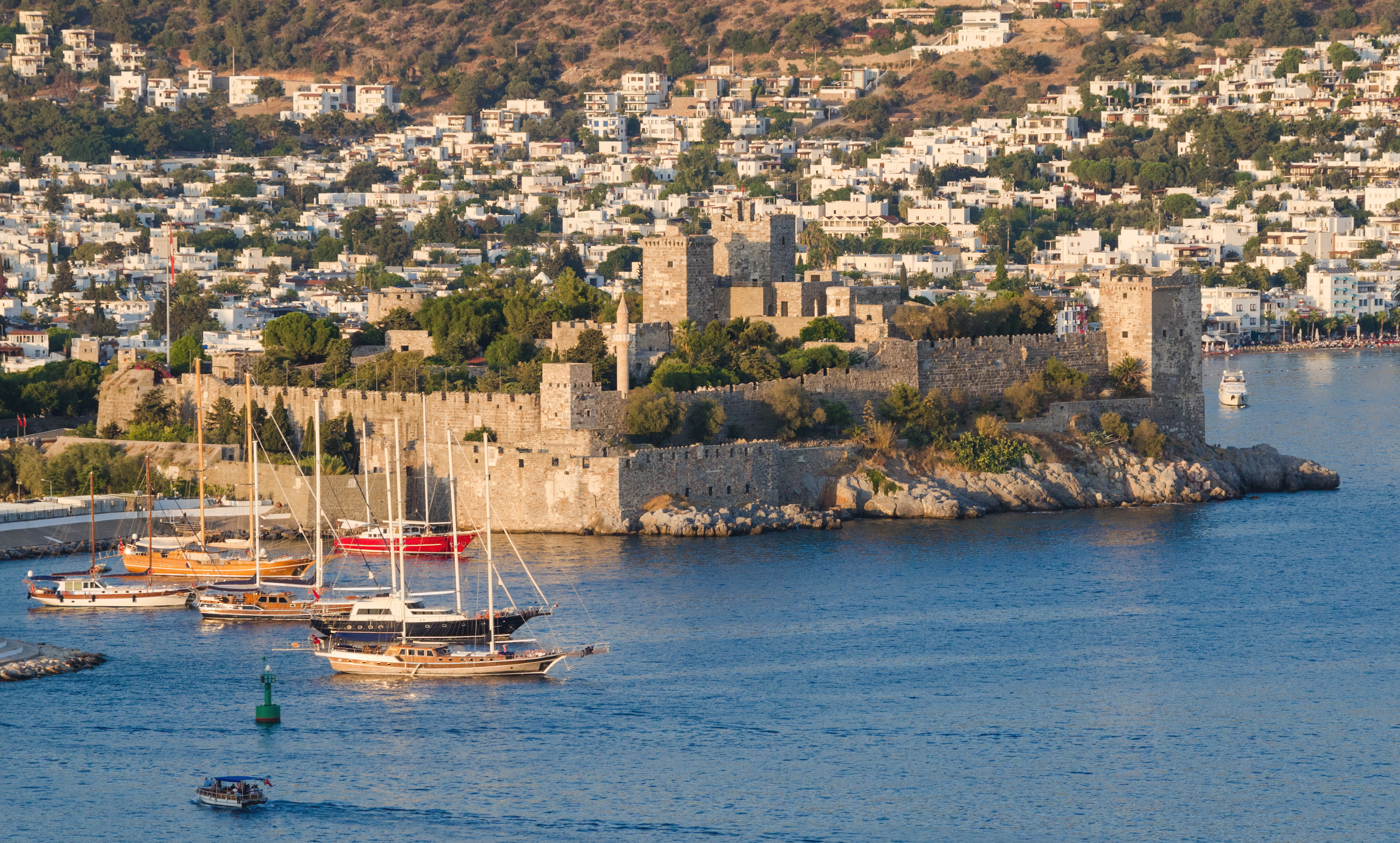

- Country: Turkey
- Largest city: İzmir
- Provinces: 8: Aydın; İzmir; Manisa; Uşak; Afyonkarahisar; Denizli; Kütahya; Muğla

Area
  - Total: 85,000 km^{2} (33,000 sq mi)
  - Rank: 5th

Population (2021 est.)
  - Total: 10,477,153
  - Density: 121/km^{2} (310/sq mi)
- Demonym: Turkish: Egeli

GDP
  - Total: US$ 102.807 billion (2022)
  - Per capita: US$ 9,810 (2022)
- Time zone: UTC+03:00 (TRT)

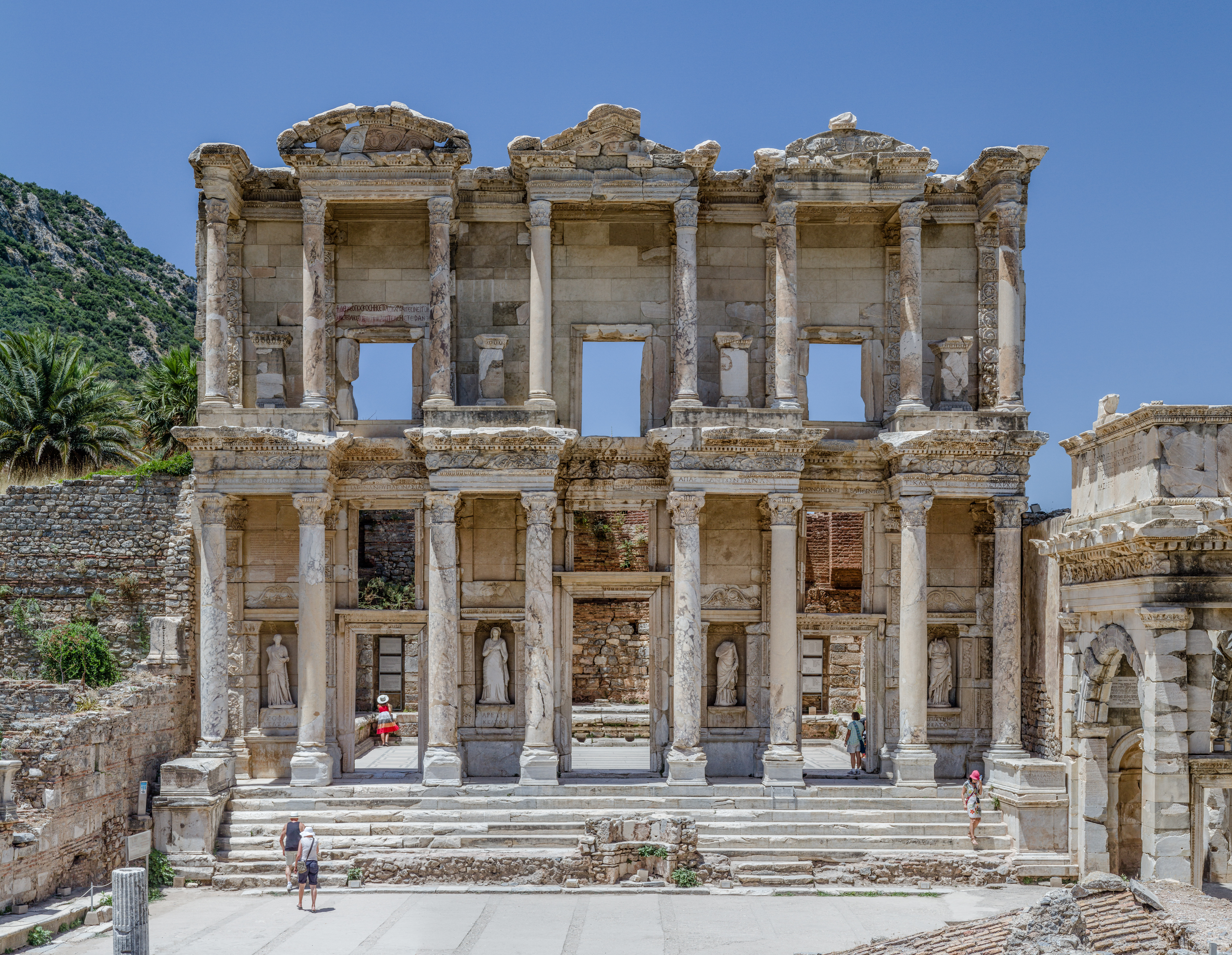
The Library of Celsus in Ephesus was built by the Romans in 114–117. The Temple of Artemis in Ephesus, built by king Croesus of Lydia in the 6th century BC, was one of the Seven Wonders of the Ancient World.

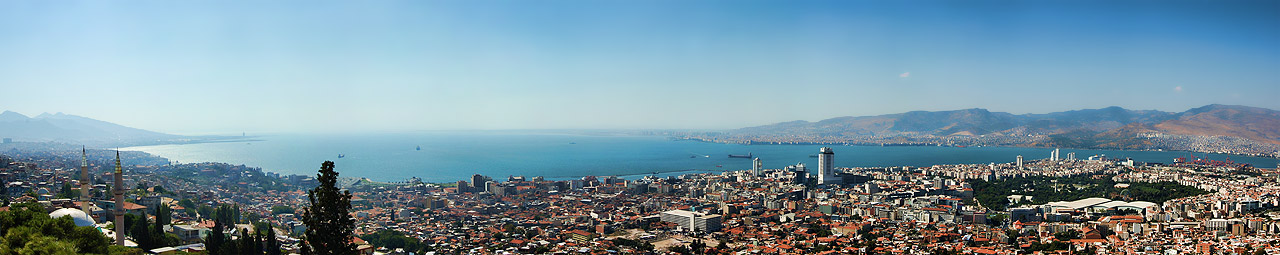
İzmir, the biggest city in the Aegean Region

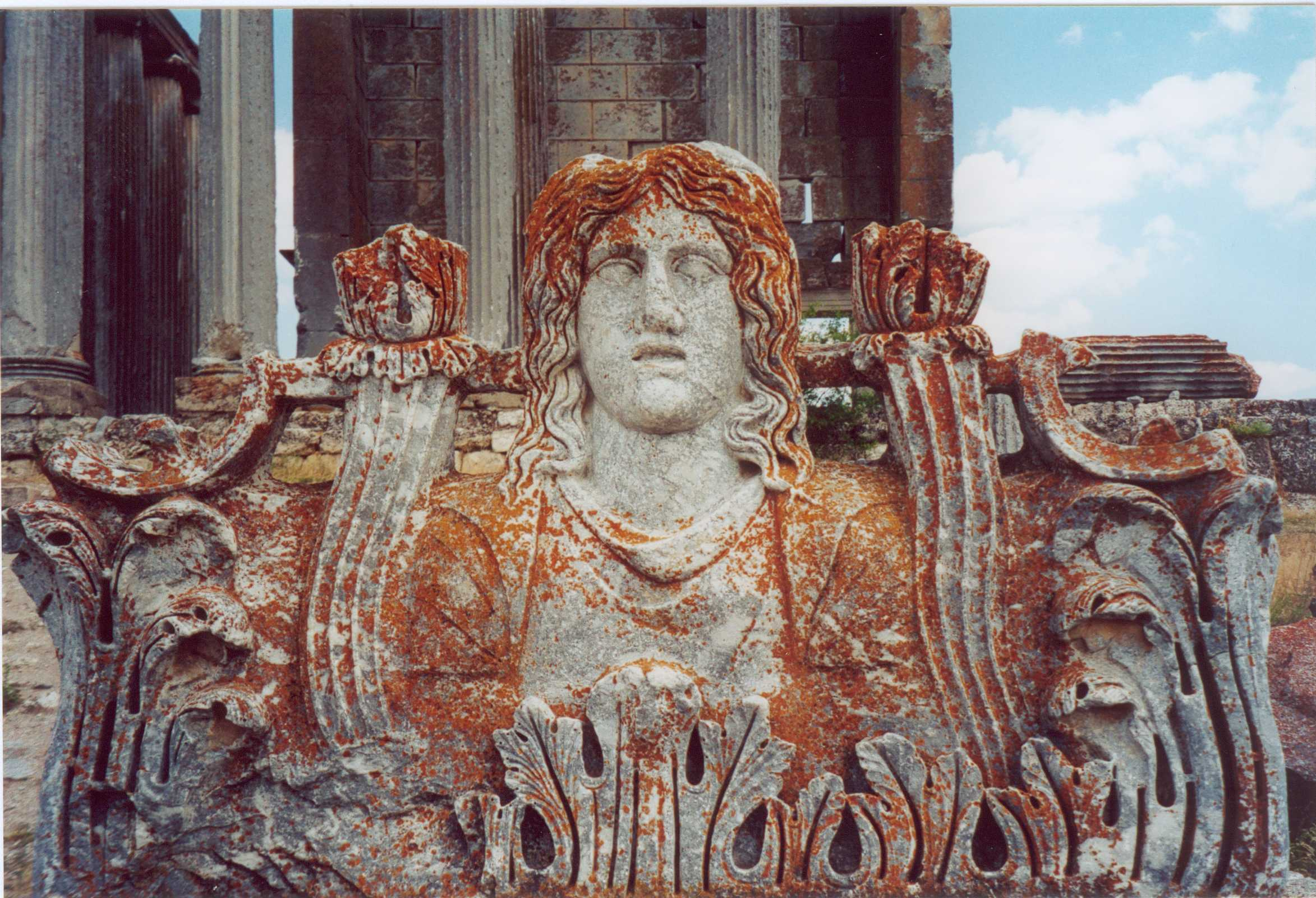
The ancient city of Aizanoi located in Kütahya

The Aegean region (Turkish: Ege Bölgesi) is one of the seven geographical regions of Turkey. The largest city in the region is İzmir. Other big cities are Manisa, Aydın, Denizli, Muğla, Afyonkarahisar and Kütahya.

Located in western Turkey, it is bordered by the Aegean Sea to the west, the Marmara region to the north, the Central Anatolia Region to the east, and the Mediterranean Region to the south.

Among the four coastal regions, the Aegean Region has the longest coastline.

== Subdivision ==
- Aegean Section (Turkish: Ege Bölümü)
  - Edremit Area (Turkish: Edremit Yöresi)
  - Bakırçay Area (Turkish: Bakırçay Yöresi)
  - Gediz Area (Turkish: Gediz Yöresi)
  - İzmir Area (Turkish: İzmir Yöresi)
  - Küçük Menderes Area (Turkish: Küçük Menderes Yöresi)
  - Büyük Menderes Area (Turkish: Büyük Menderes Yöresi)
  - Menteşe Area (Turkish: Menteşe Yöresi)
- Inner Western Anatolia Section (Turkish: İç Batı Anadolu Bölümü)

== Ecoregions ==
The ecoregions of this region are all Terrestrial, more specifically Palearctic, and still more so, Mediterranean forests, woodlands, and scrub. Different parts are within the following classifications:

- Aegean and Western Turkey sclerophyllous and mixed forests
- Anatolian conifer and deciduous mixed forests
- Southern Anatolian montane conifer and deciduous forests

== Provinces ==
Provinces that are entirely in the Aegean Region:

- Aydın
- İzmir
- Manisa
- Uşak

Provinces that are mostly in the Aegean Region:

- Afyonkarahisar
- Denizli
- Kütahya
- Muğla

Provinces that are partially in the Aegean Region:

- Balıkesir
- Bilecik
- Bursa
- Çanakkale
- Eskişehir

== Climate ==
Aydın

Climate chart (precipitation, max. and min. temperature)
| J | F | M | A | M | J | J | A | S | O | N | D |
| 103 13 4 | 86 15 5 | 71 18 7 | 57 23 10 | 35 28 14 | 18 34 18 | 8 36 20 | 5 36 20 | 16 32 17 | 45 27 13 | 90 20 8 | 117 15 6 |
- █ Average max. and min. temperatures in °C
- █ Precipitation totals in mm
- Source: Turkish State Meteorology
Imperial conversion
| J | F | M | A | M | J | J | A | S | O | N | D |
| 4.1 55 39 | 3.4 59 41 | 2.8 64 45 | 2.2 73 50 | 1.4 82 57 | 0.7 93 64 | 0.3 97 68 | 0.2 97 68 | 0.6 90 63 | 1.8 81 55 | 3.5 68 46 | 4.6 59 43 |
- █ Average max. and min. temperatures in °F
- █ Precipitation totals in inches

The climate of the Aegean Region has a Mediterranean climate at the coast, with hot, dry summers and mild to cool, wet winters and a semi-arid continental climate in the interior with hot, dry summers and cold, snowy winters.

== Gallery ==
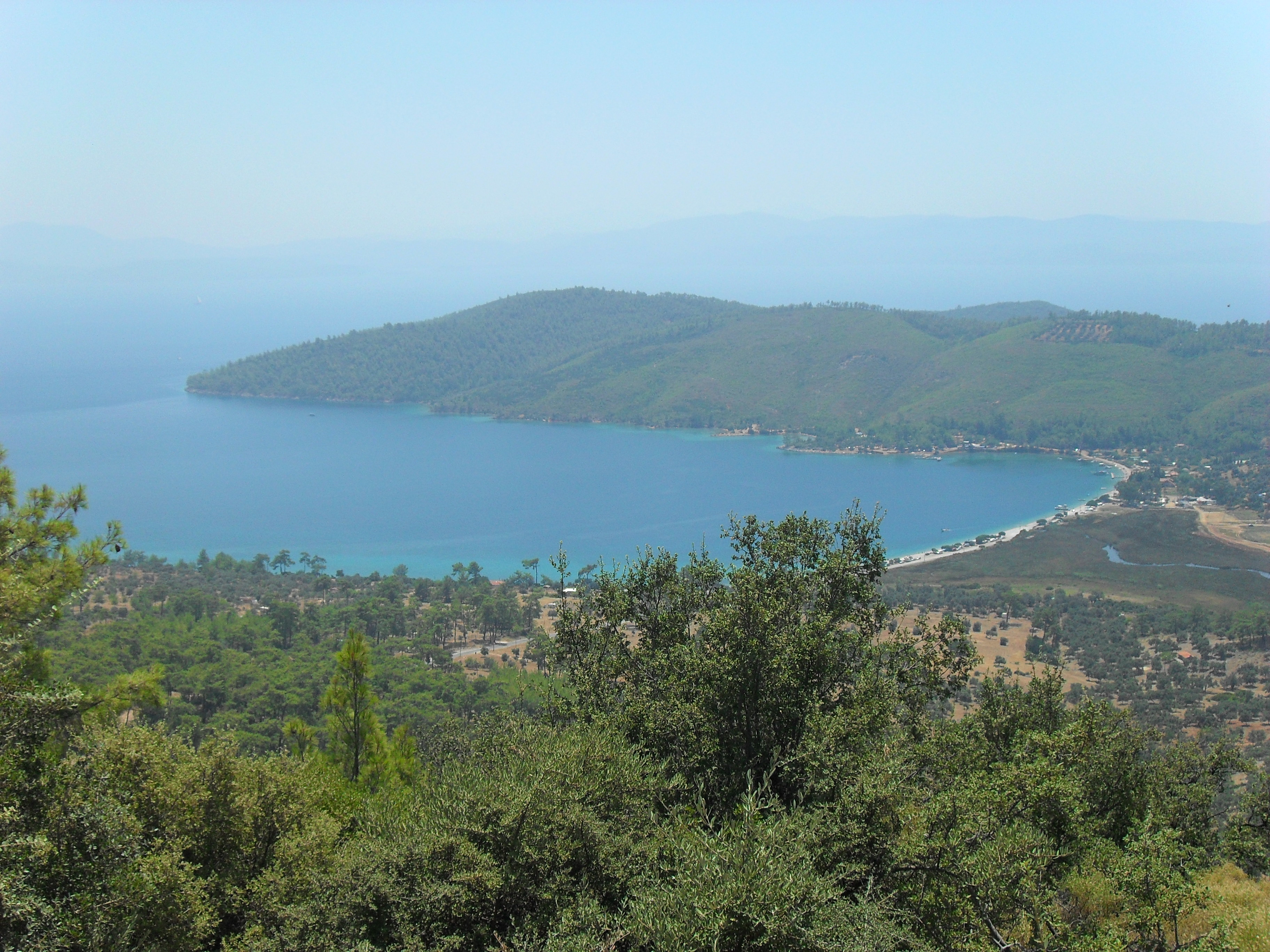
Cove in Muğla, Akbük beach between Muğla - Milas

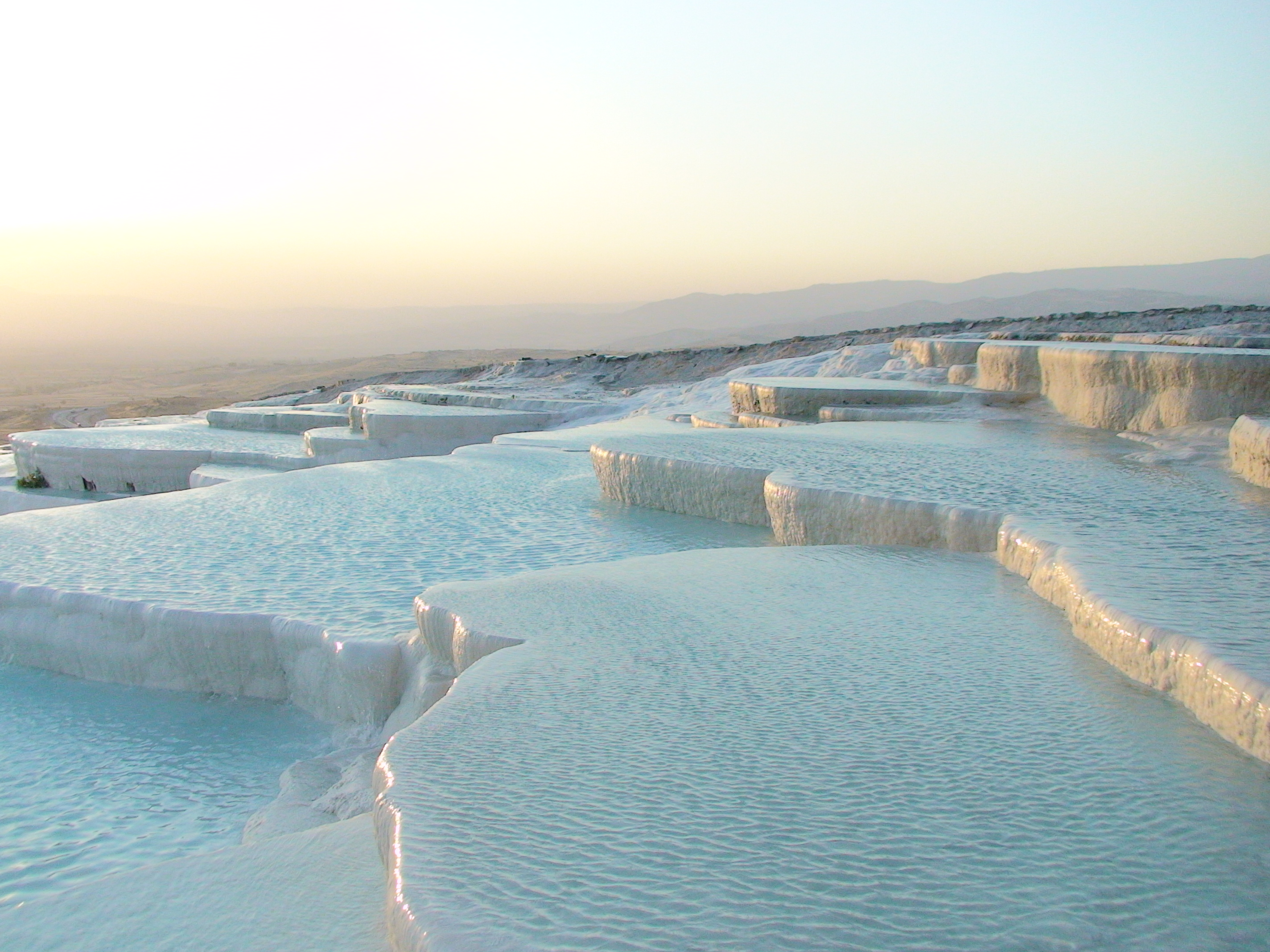
Nature's wonder Denizli, Pamukkale

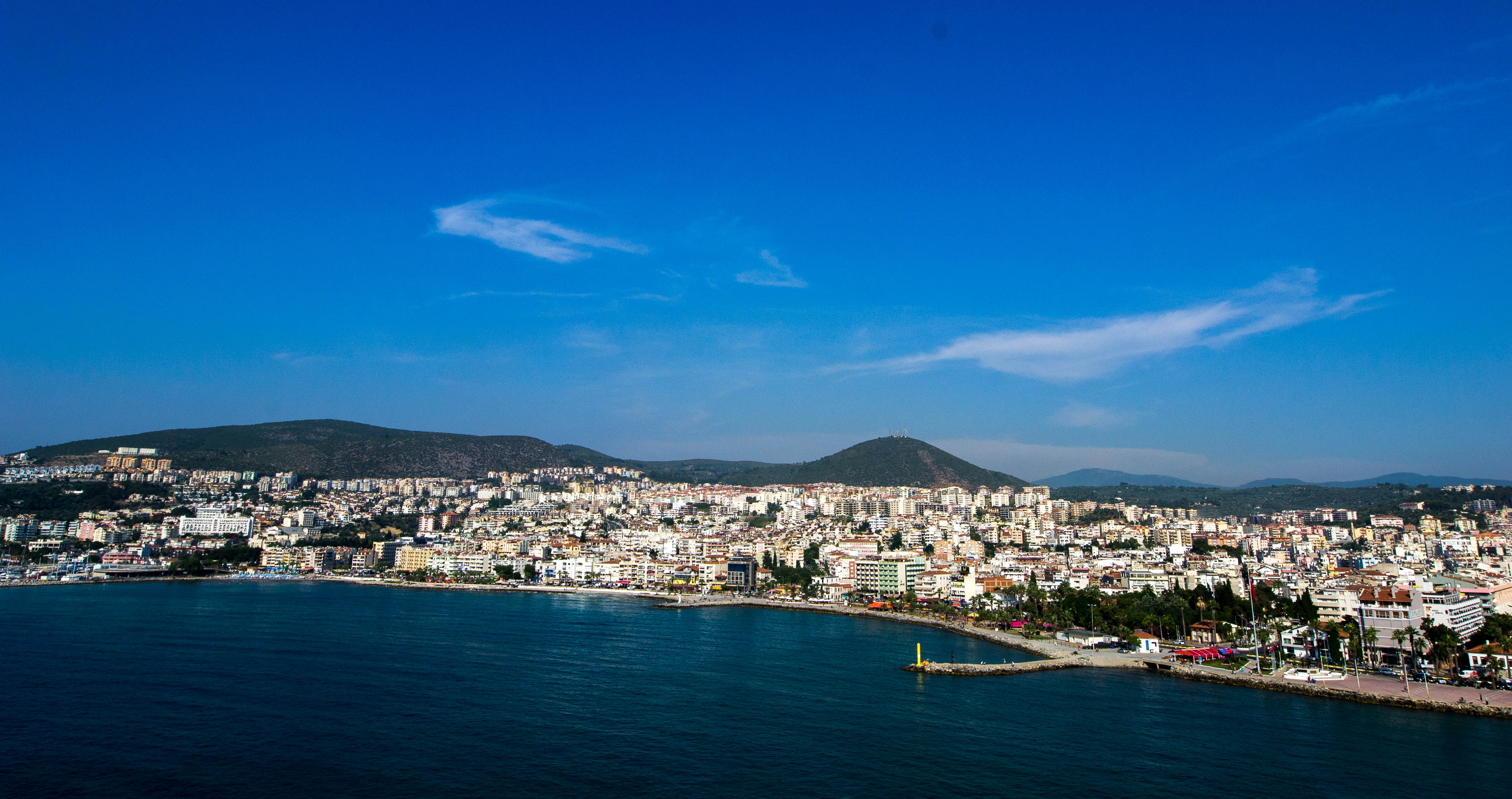
View of Kuşadası, Aydın

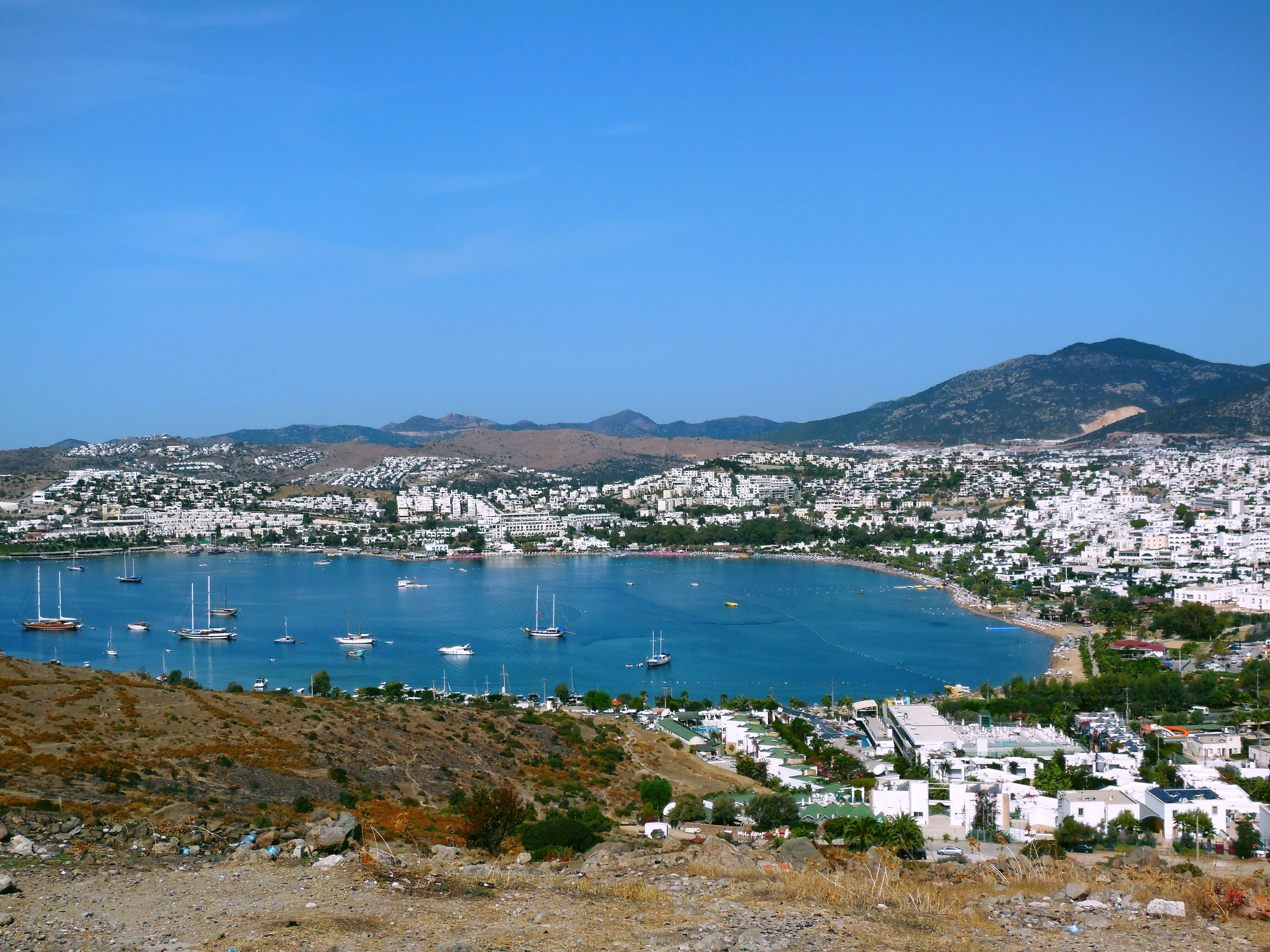
Bodrum's cityscape is dominated by white buildings.

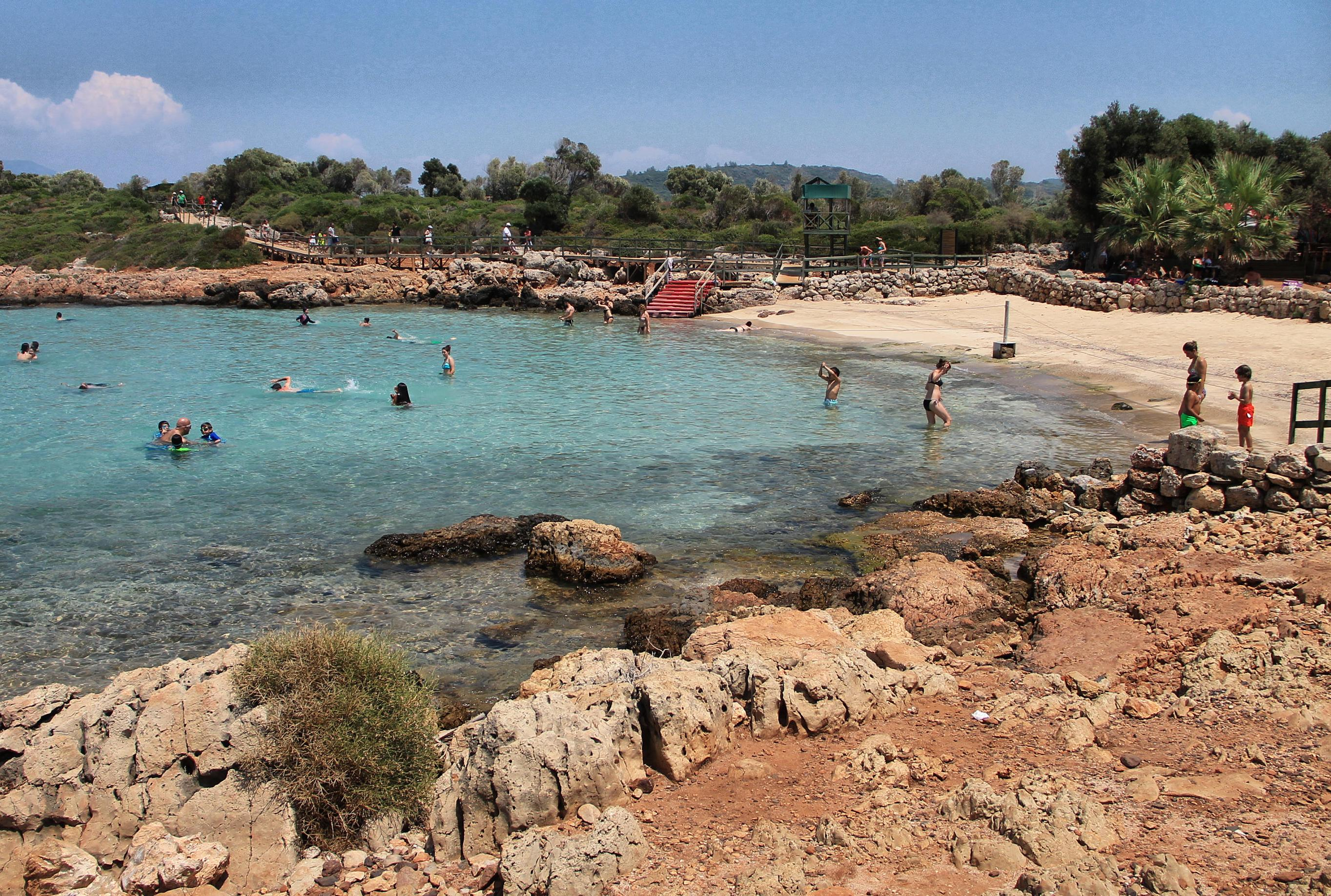
Sehir Island in Marmaris

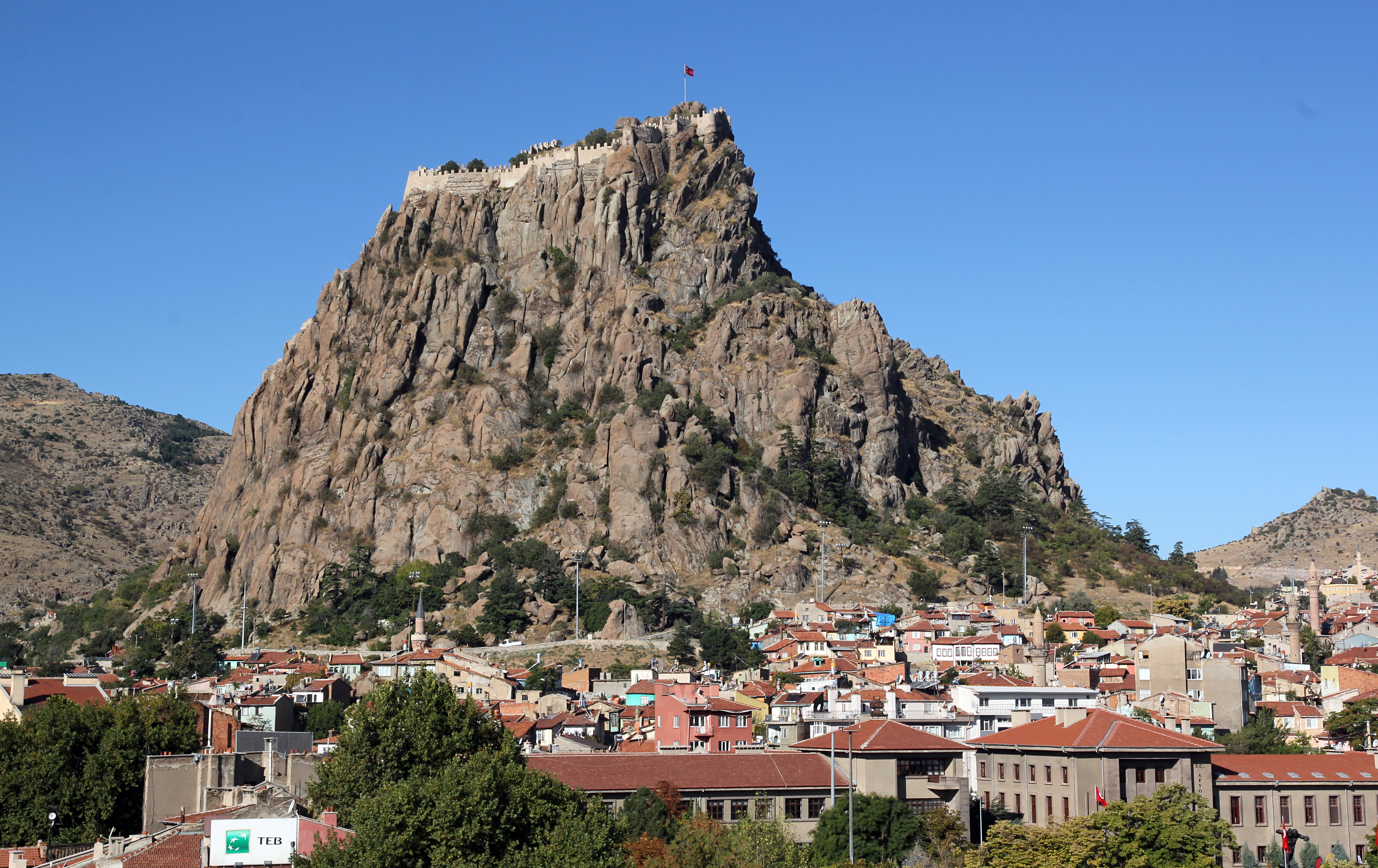
Afyonkarahisar Castle

== See also ==
- List of regions of Turkey
- Provinces of Turkey
