= Aydın =

- Metropolitan municipality
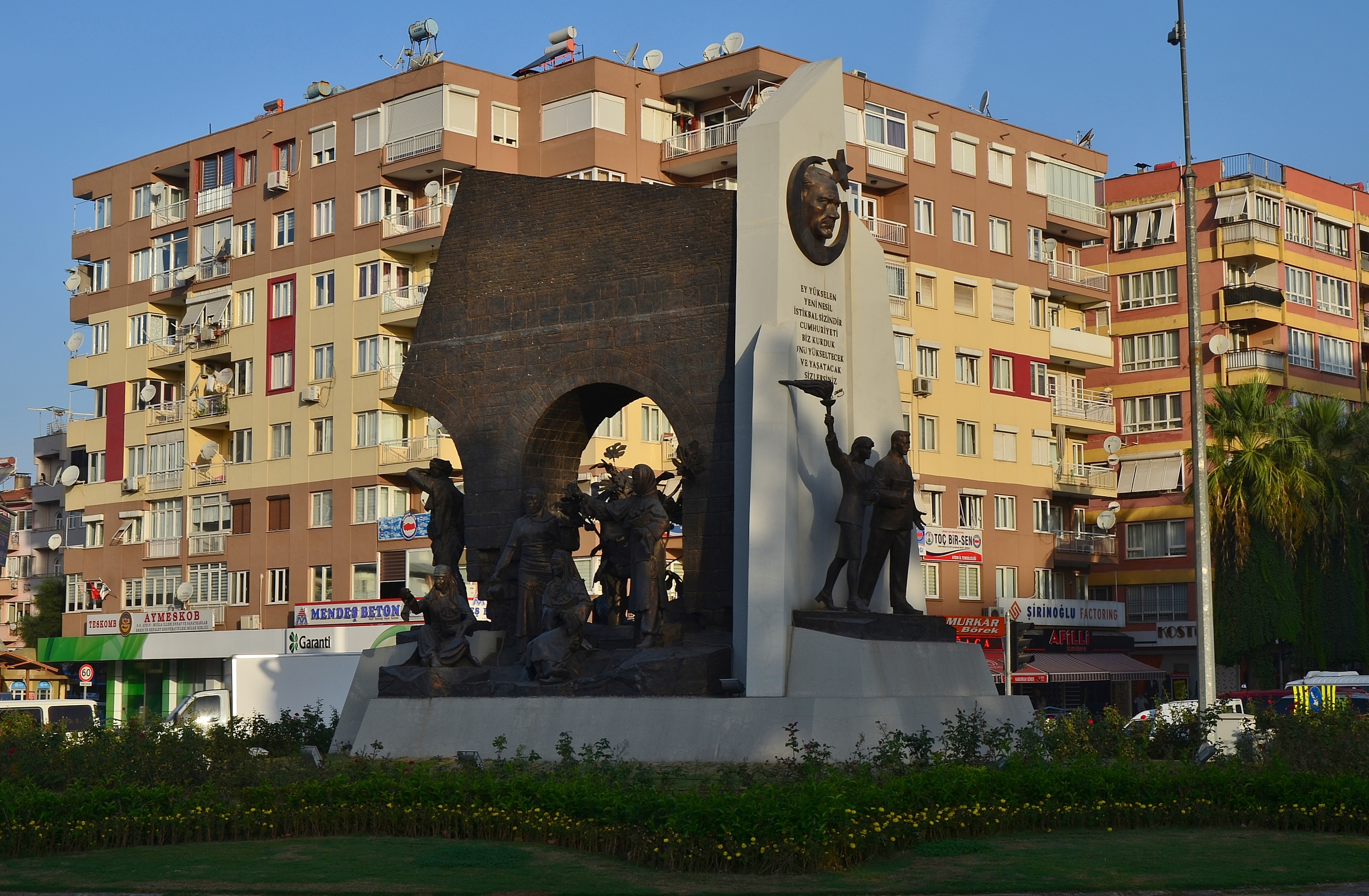
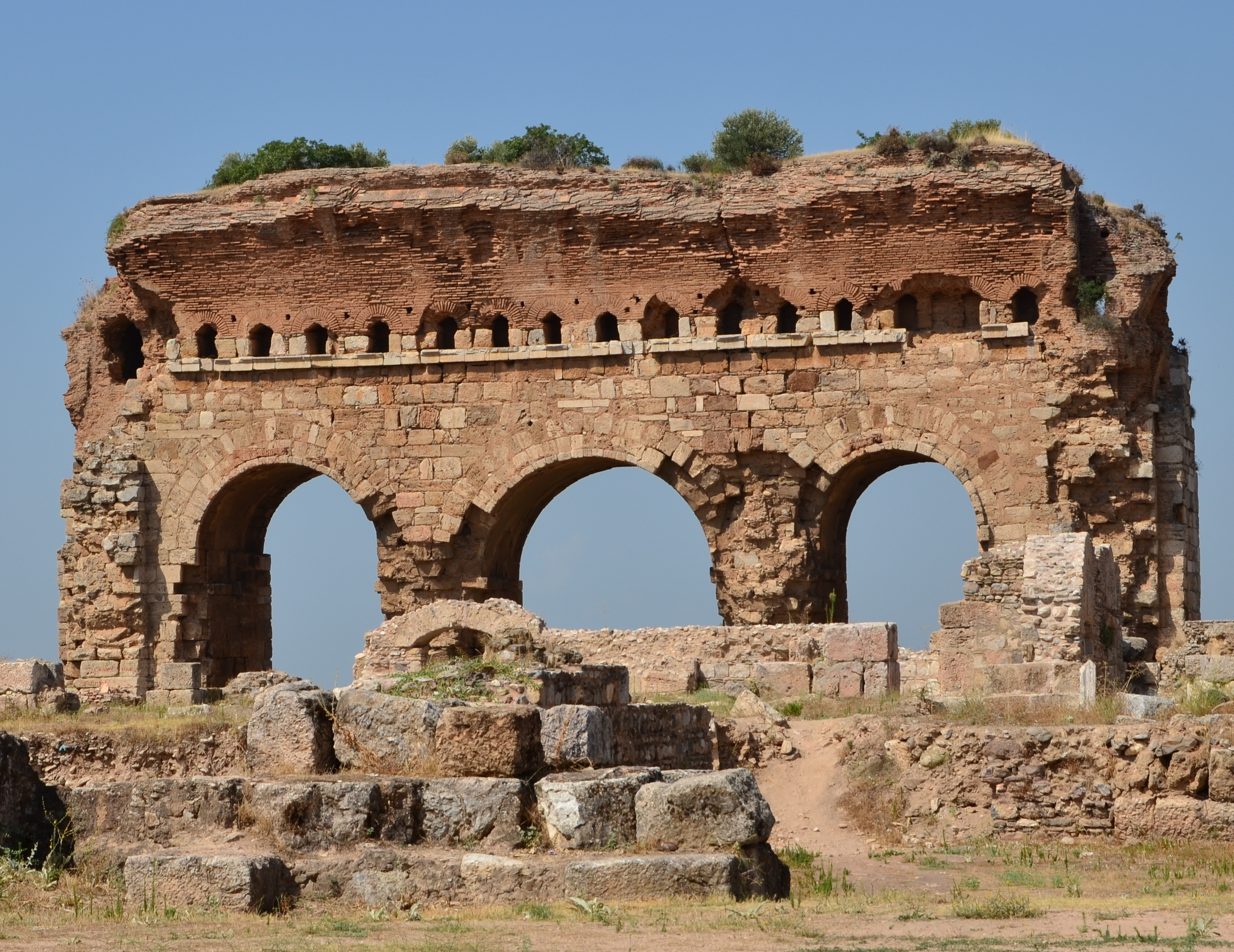
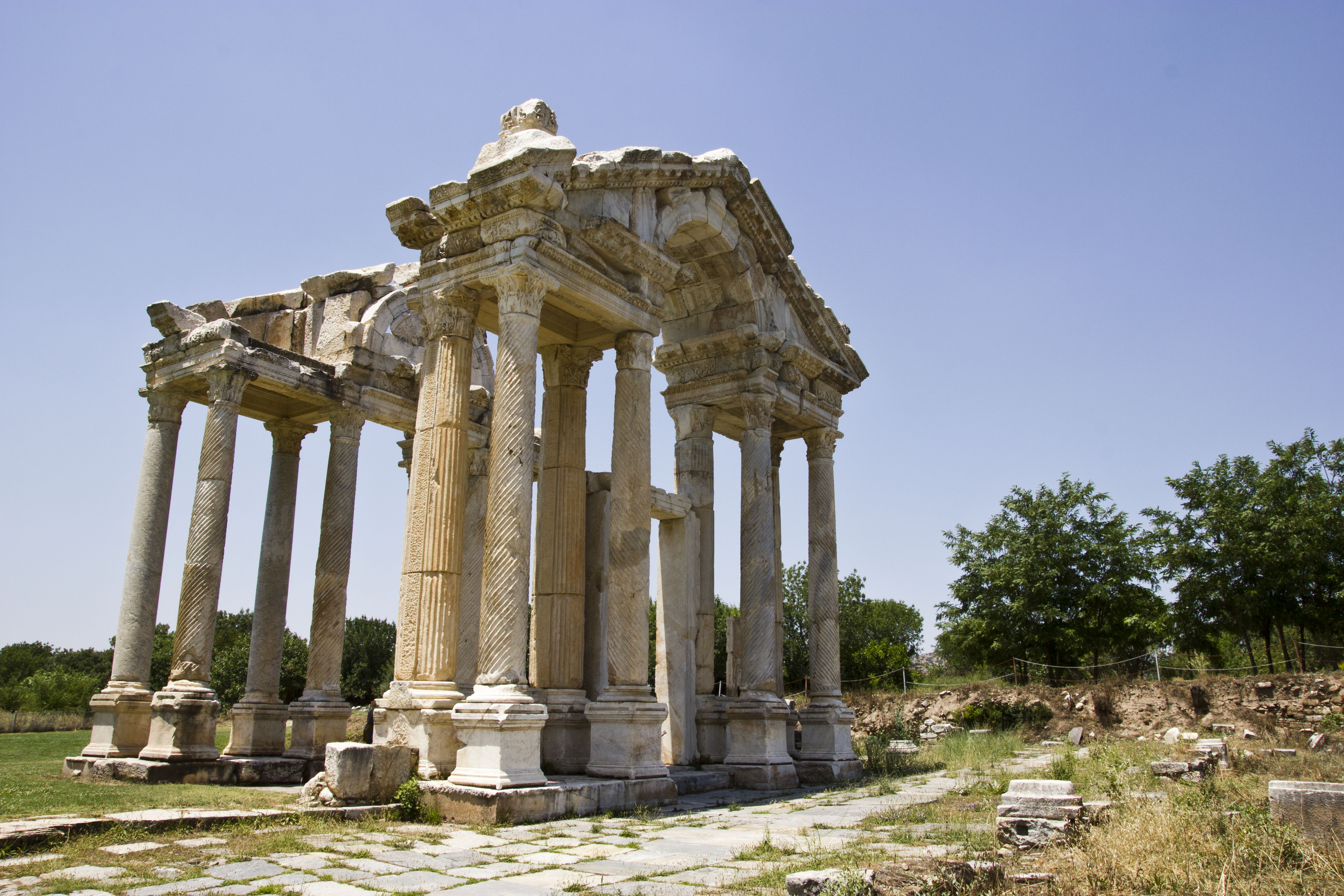
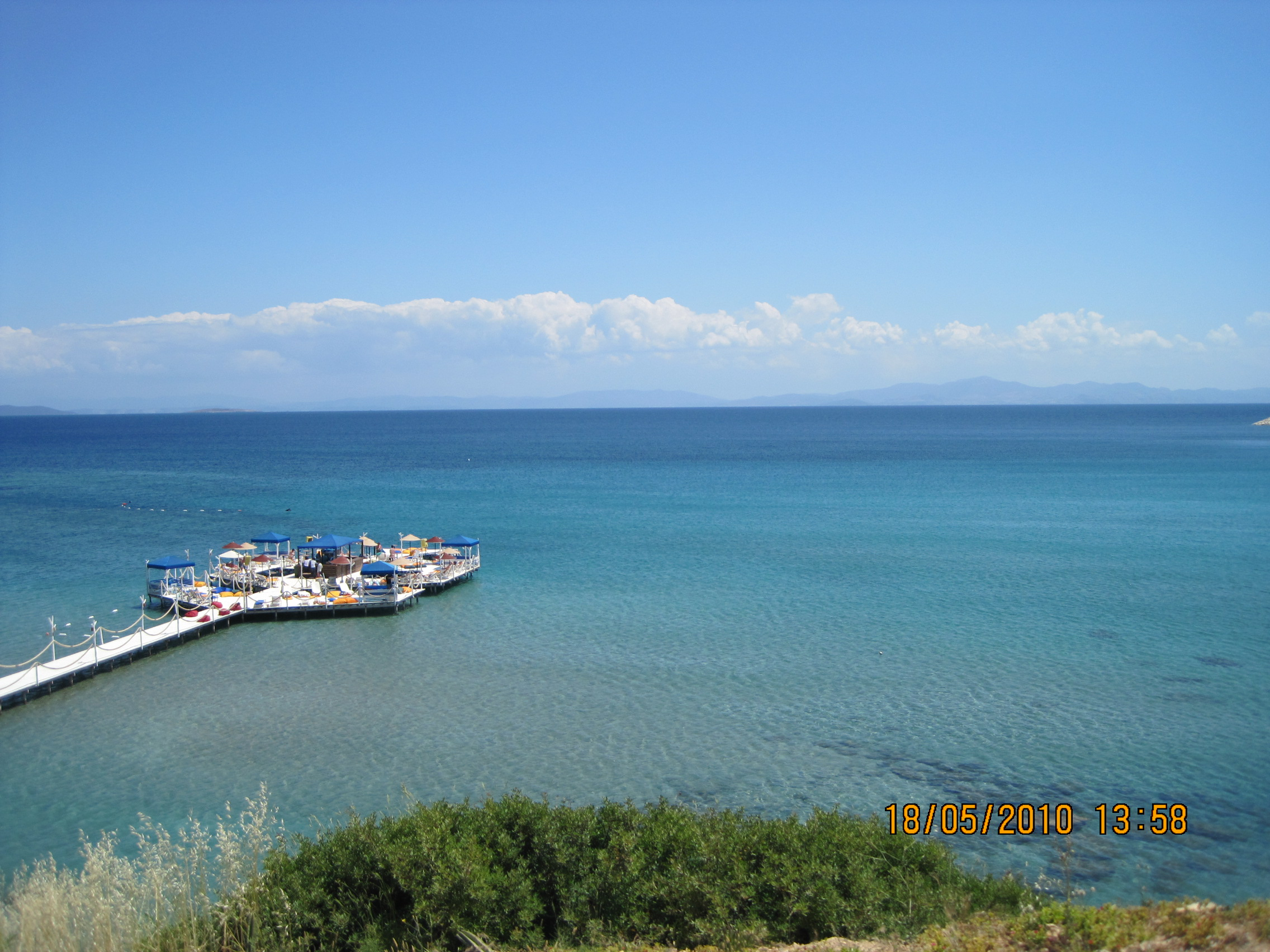
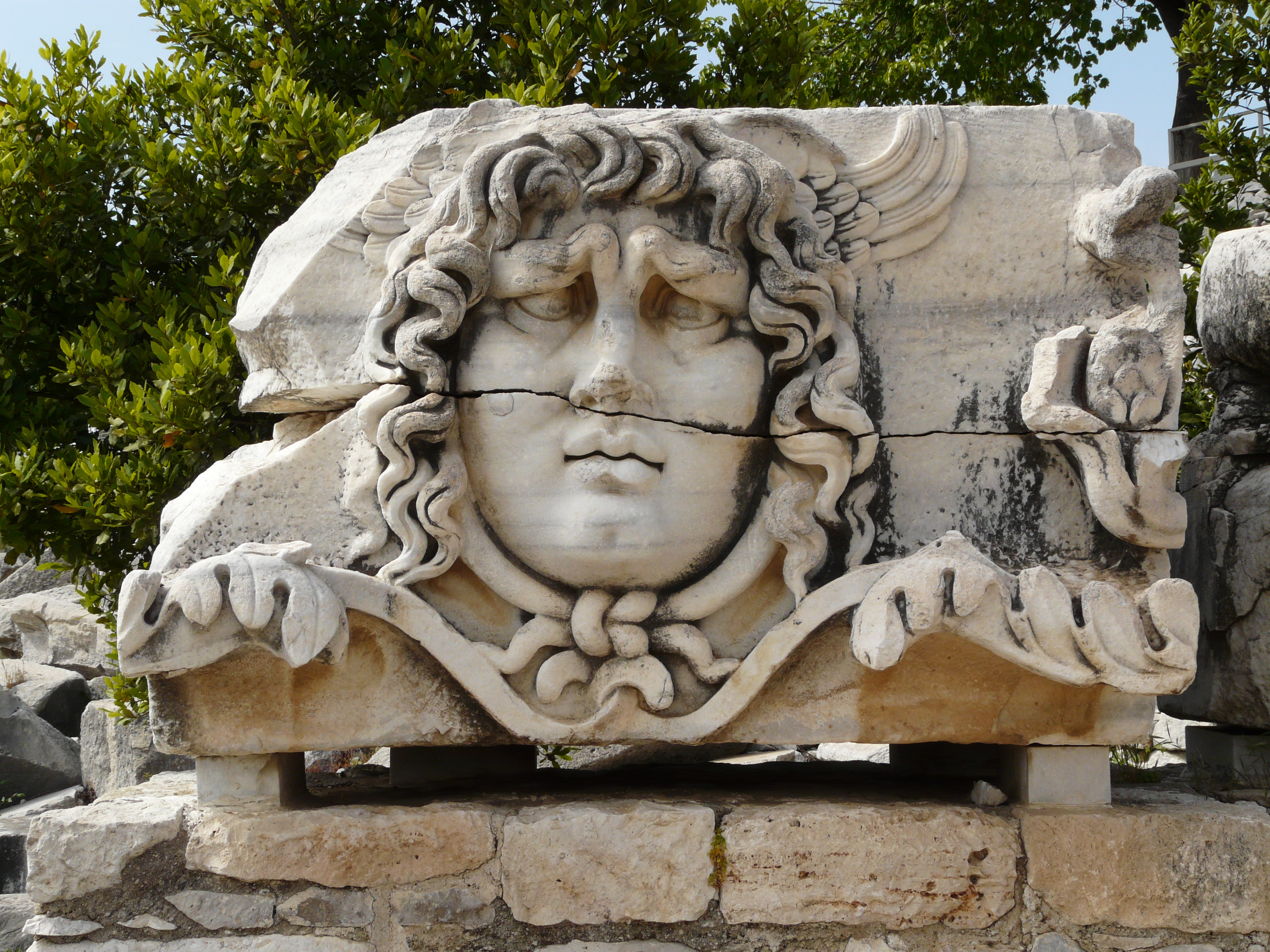
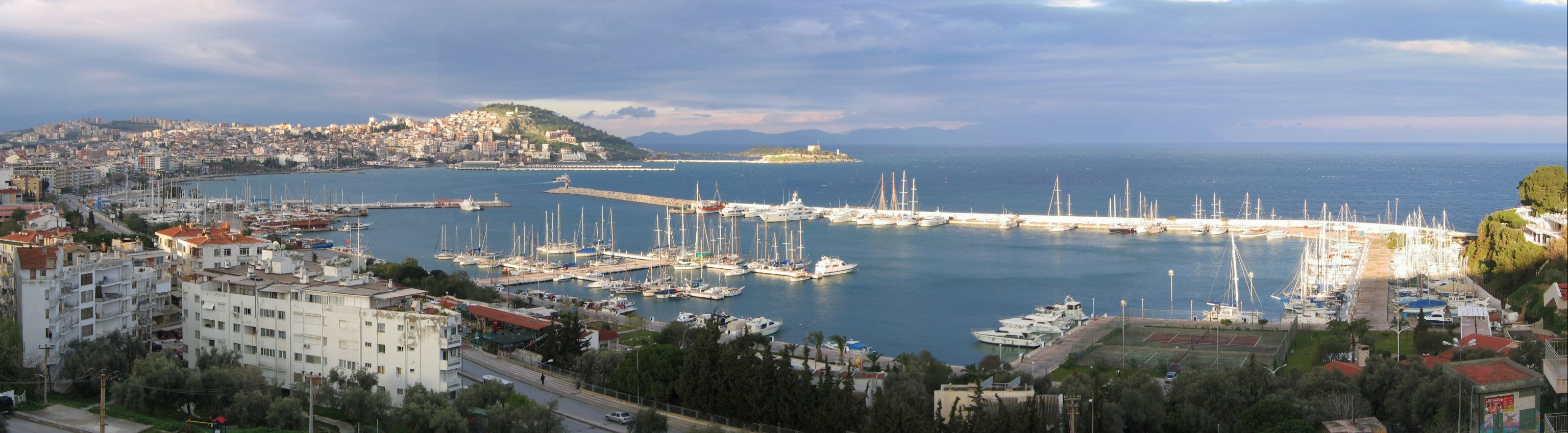
- From top to bottom: Aydın Monument, Tralleis, Aphrodisias, Didim, Temple of Apollo, Kuşadası

- Emblem of Aydın Metropolitan Municipality

- Location within Turkey Location within Europe Location within Earth
- Coordinates: 37°50′53″N 27°50′43″E
- Country: Turkey
- Province: Aydın

Government
  - Mayor: Özlem Çerçioğlu (AKP)

Population (2022)
  - Total: 259,027
- Time zone: UTC+3 (TRT)
- Website: www.aydin-bld.gov.tr

Aydın (/ˈaɪdɪn/ EYE-din; Turkish: [ˈajdɯn]; formerly named Güzelhisar; Greek: Τράλλεις Tralleis) is a city in and the seat of Aydın Province in Turkey's Aegean Region. The city is located at the heart of the lower valley of Büyük Menderes River (ancient Meander River) at a commanding position for the region extending from the uplands of the valley down to the seacoast. The city forms the urban part of the Efeler district, with a population of 259,027 in 2022. Aydın city is located along a region which was famous for its fertility and productivity since ancient times. Figs remain the province's best-known crop, although other agricultural products are also grown intensively and the city also has a light industry.

At the crossroads of a busy transport network of several types, a six-lane motorway connects Aydın to İzmir, Turkey's second port, in less than an hour, and in still less time to the international Adnan Menderes Airport, located along the road between the two cities. A smaller airport, namely Aydın Airport, is located a few kilometers in the South-East of Aydın. The region of Aydın also pioneered the introduction of railways into Turkey in the 19th century and still has the densest railroad network.

The province of Aydın is also where a number of internationally known historic sites and centers of tourism are concentrated.

== Etymology ==
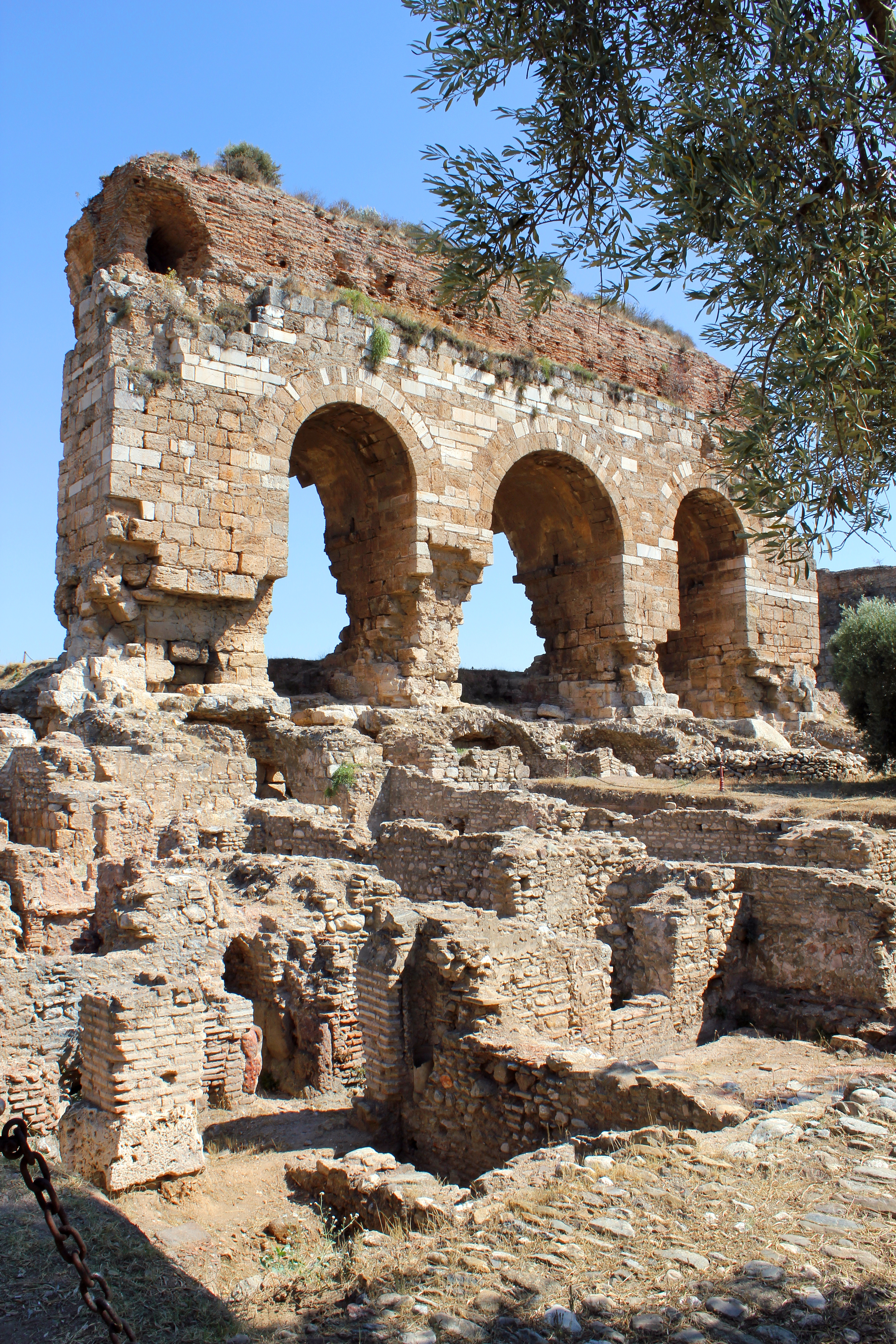
Ancient city of Tralles in Aydın

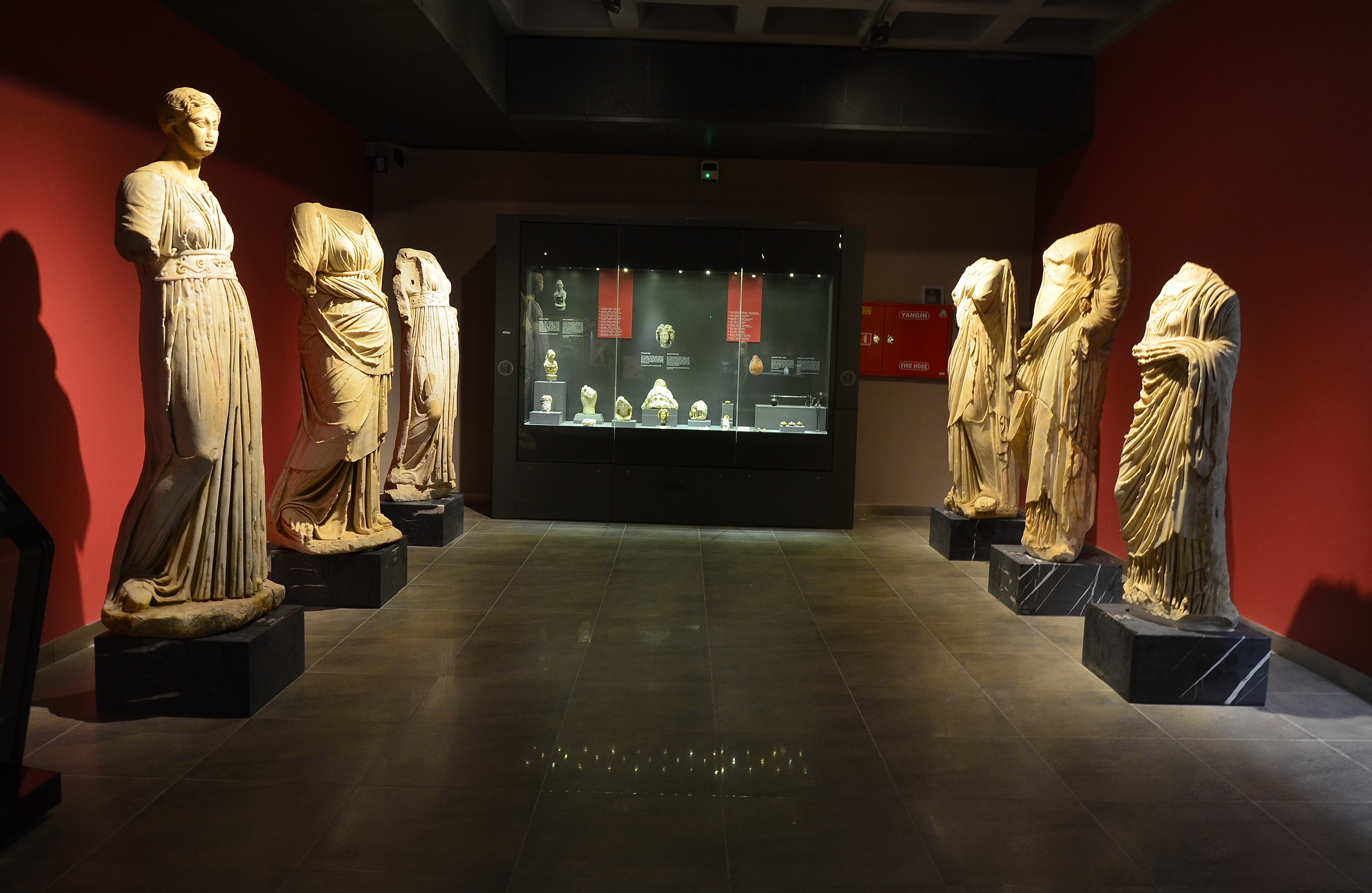
Women statues in Aydın Archaeological Museum.

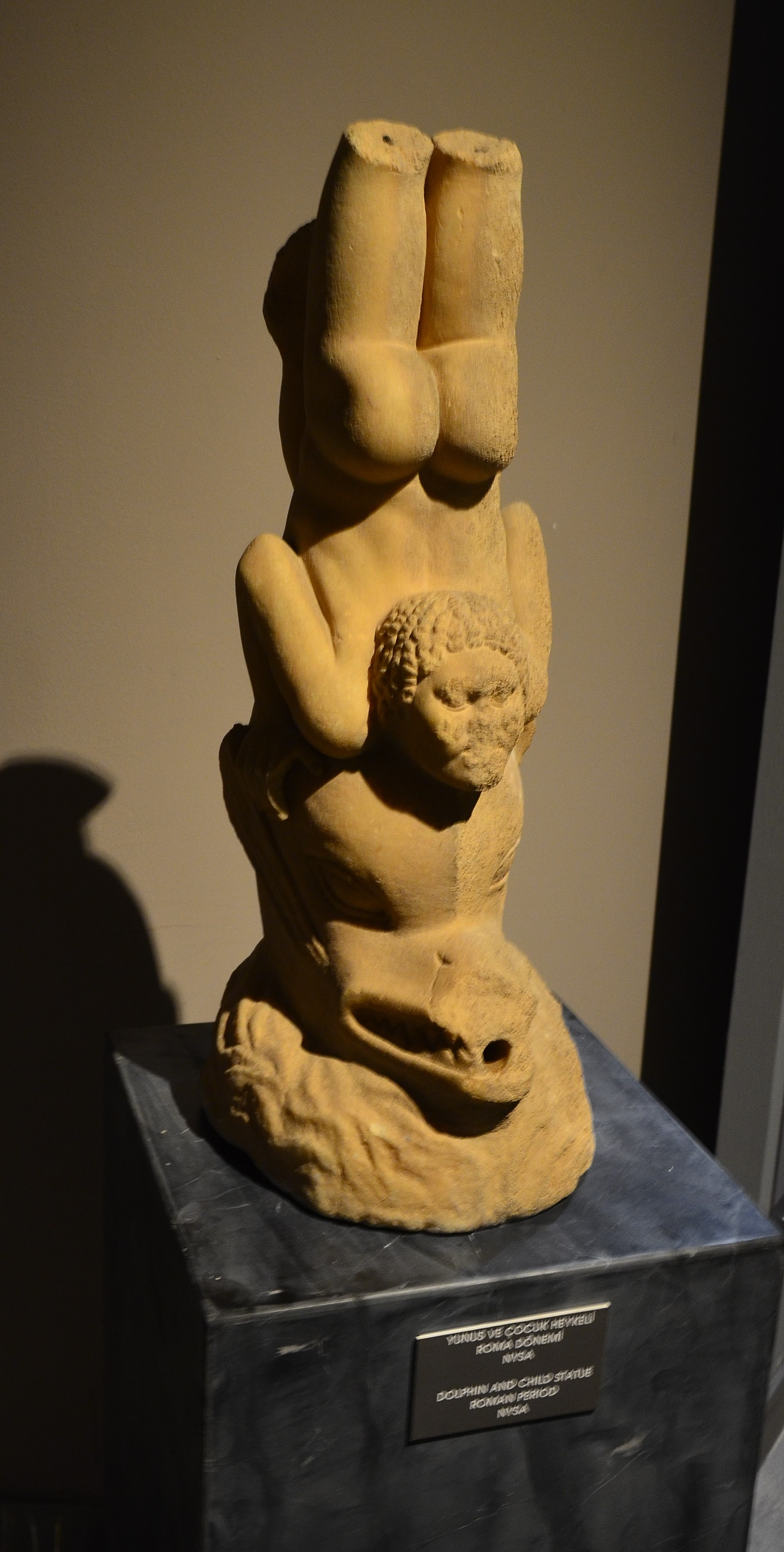
Ancient Roman statue of a child with dolphin found in Nysa in Aydın Archaeological Museum in Aydın.

After the first capture of the city by the Turks under the emirate (Beylik) of Menteşe (Menteshe), whose lands extended towards the south, who named it for a first period as Güzelhisar, literally "the beautiful castle" (sometimes rendered as Guzel Hissar). The city was later taken over by Turks of the Aydinids, whose lands extended towards the north, who named it after Aydinid dynasty. "Aydın" meant "lucid, enlightened" in Turkish and in a distinct evolution of the term, came to mean "lettered, educated, intellectual" in modern Turkish. It is still a popular male name.

In ancient Greek sources, the name of the city is given as Anthea (Ανθέα) and Euanthia (Ευανθία). During the Seleucid period, it received the name Antiochia (Greek: Αντιόχεια). At other times it was also called Seleucia ad Maeandrum (Σελεύκεια επί του Μαιάνδρου) and Erynina (Ερυνίνα). In Roman and Byzantine times, it was known as Tralles (in Latin) or Tralleis (Τράλλεις in Ancient Greek), and was one of the largest Aegean cities in antiquity. There is some indication that it once bore the name Charax (Χάραξ), but that name may have belonged to Acharaca.

Nevertheless, the name Güzelhisar was used throughout the early centuries of the Ottoman administration as well, often recorded in adjectival form, as "Güzelhisar of Aydın (lands)", but the name Aydın was increasingly preferred. This previous Turkish name also found its way into the international trade vocabulary until at least the end of the 18th century and its modified forms Joselassar and even Joseph Lasat were used to describe a fine type of cotton produced in this same region and much sought after.

== History ==
=== Antiquity ===
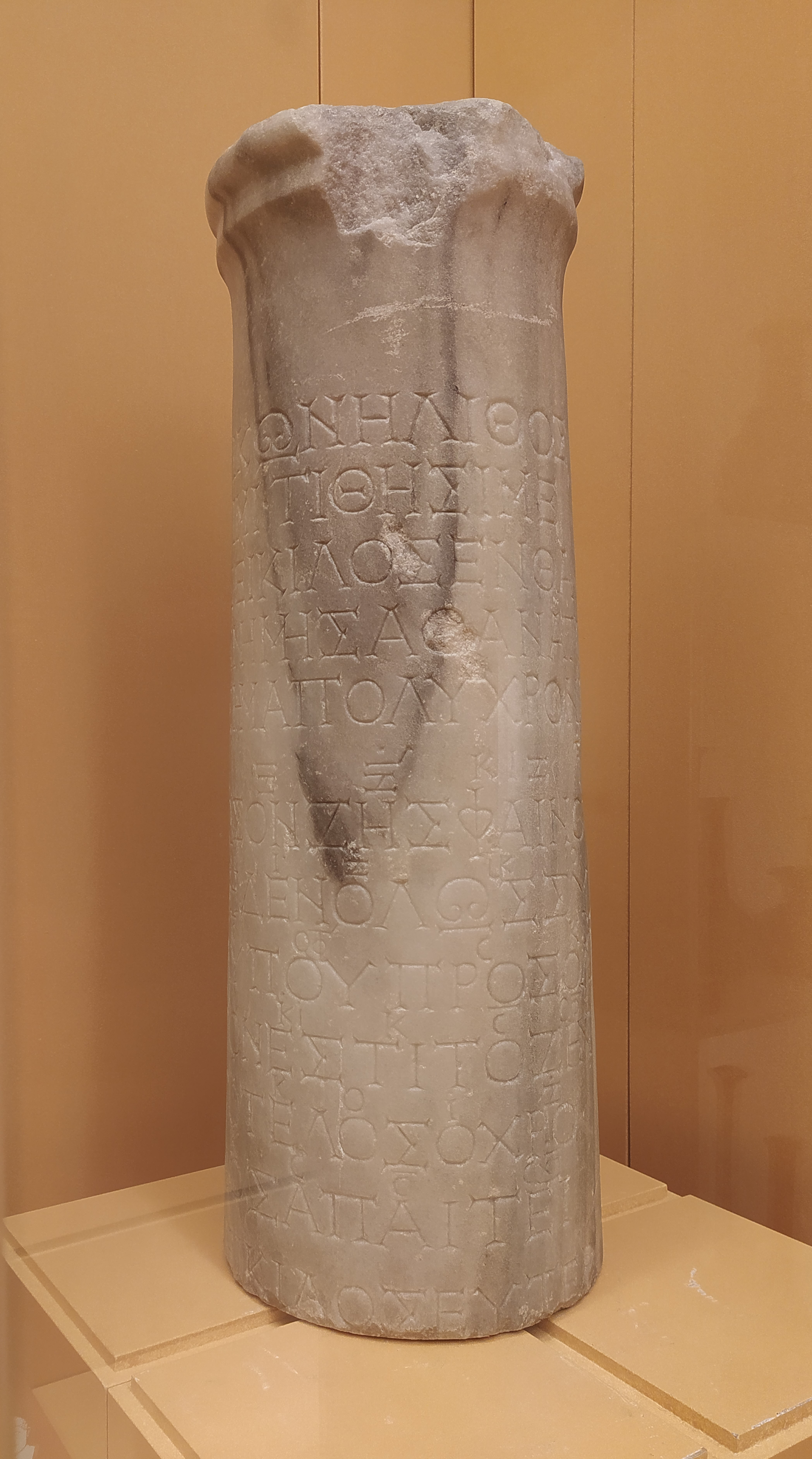
Marble stele, the so-called Seikilos column, with poetry and musical notation

According to Strabo Tralles was founded by the Argives and Trallians. Along with the rest of Lydia, the city fell to the Persian Empire. After its success against Athens in the Peloponnesian War, Sparta unsuccessfully sought to take the city from the Persians, but in 334 BC, Tralles surrendered to Alexander the Great without resistance and therefore was not sacked. Alexander's general Antigonus held the city from 313 to 301 BC and later the Seleucids held the city until 190 BC when it fell to Pergamon. From 133 to 129 BC, the city supported Aristonicus of Pergamon, a pretender to the Pergamene throne, against the Romans. After the Romans defeated him, they revoked the city's right to mint coins.

Tralles was a conventus for a time under the Roman Republic, but Ephesus later took over that position. The city was taken by rebels during the Mithridatic War during which many Roman inhabitants were killed. Tralles suffered greatly from an earthquake in 26 BC. Augustus provided funds for its reconstruction after which the city thanked him by renaming itself Caesarea.

Strabo describes the city as a prosperous trading center, listing famous residents of the city, including Pythodoros (native of Nysa), and orators Damasus Scombrus and Dionysocles. Several centuries later, Anthemius of Tralles, architect of the Hagia Sophia in Constantinople, was born in Tralles.

=== Christianity and Byzantine era ===
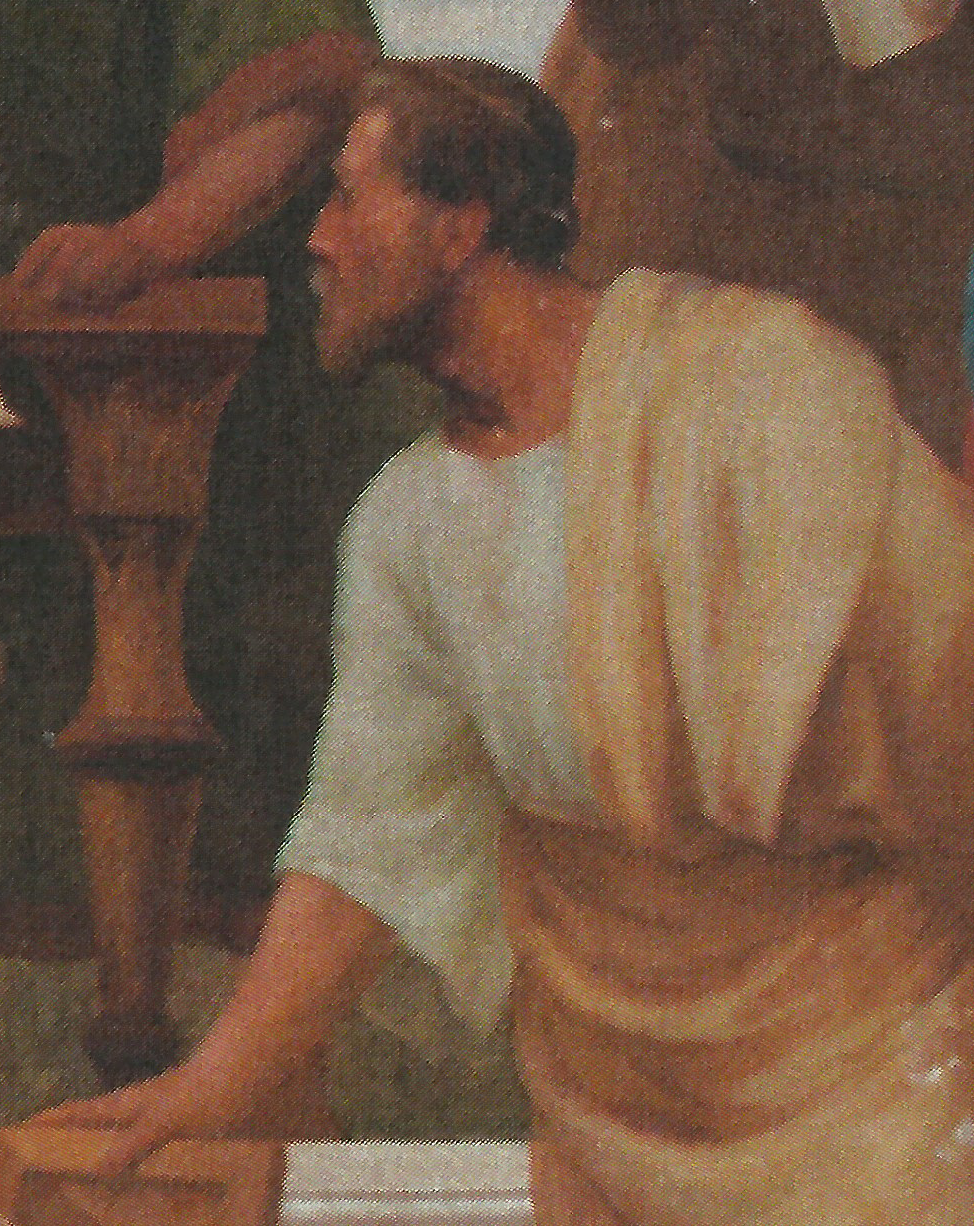
Alexander of Tralles was one of the most eminent physicians of the early Byzantine Empire.

An early bishop Polybius (fl. ca. 105) is attested by a letter from Saint Ignatius of Antioch to the church at Tralles. The city was officially Christianized, along with the rest of Caria, early after the conversion of Constantine, at which time the see was confirmed. Among the recorded bishops are: Heracleon (431), Maximus (451), Uranius (553), Myron (692), Theophylactus (787), Theophanes and Theopistus both ninth century, and John (1230). The Catholic Church includes this bishopric in its list of titular sees as Tralles in Asia, distinguishing it from the see of Tralles in Lydia. It has appointed no new titular bishop to these Eastern sees since the Second Vatican Council.

After the Battle of Manzikert in 1071, with the Byzantine Empire in civil chaos, the Seljuks took Tralles for the first time but Alexios I Komnenos re-captured the city for Byzantium in the later half of the eleventh century.

By the 13th century, the city lay in ruins. In 1278, Andronikos II Palaiologos decided to rebuild and repopulate it, now to be renamed Andronikopolis or Palaiologopolis, with the aim of forming a bulwark against Turkish encroachment in the area. The megas domestikos Michael Tarchaneiotes was given the task: he rebuilt the walls and settled 36,000 people from the surrounding regions. 13th century Byzantine settlement policy along the Meander Valley notably involved the Cumans. Nevertheless, Turkish attacks resumed soon after. The city was besieged and, lacking sufficient supplies and access to water, was captured by the beylik of Menteshe in 1284. The city suffered extensive destruction and many of its inhabitants were massacred. Moreover, over 20,000 inhabitants were sold off as slaves.

=== Turkic/Ottoman era ===
Under the rule of Menteshe, whose lands extended towards the south, the city was renamed as Güzelhisar ("beautiful castle"). The city was later taken over by the Aydinids, who made it one of their principal settlements, but not the capital.

The Beylik of Aydin was founded in the region in 1307 and they ruled the lands north of Büyük Menderes River up to and including İzmir. During the first half of the 14th century, Aydinids were as active as the Ottomans, if not more, in pressuring the islands and the lands west of Anatolia, and they caused much hardship for the Byzantine and Latin dependencies of the Aegean Sea and mainland Greece. The principality was taken over by the rising Ottoman Empire, for the first time shortly before the Battle of Ankara between the Ottomans and Tamerlane in 1402, and then Tamerlane having given back the province to the sons of Aydın. Finally Ottomans definitely captured it in 1425.

Aydın became part of Anatolia Province of the Ottoman Empire and this until 1827, when it became the seat of its own eyalet under its own name, constituted among other reasons to respond to the prevalent unrest in the region, as exemplified by Atçalı Kel Mehmet Rebellion (1829–1830). The seat was moved to İzmir in the 1840s and with the abolition of eyalets under the administrative reforms of 1864, Aydın became a sanjak (subprovince) of the vilayet of the same name, with its seat still in İzmir, which had outgrown Aydın city in size as it became a booming port of international trade.

In the 19th century Aydın continued to benefit from its location at the center of the fertile Menderes valley, and its population grew. At that time, besides figs and olive oil, which were the traditional crops of the region, cotton also grew in importance, with many European investors seeking alternative sources of cotton at the time of the American Civil War.

=== Construction of İzmir-Aydın railway ===
The first railroad commenced in the Ottoman Empire and the first finished within the present-day territory of Turkey was built by the British Levant Company connecting Aydın to Smyrna (now İzmir). The 130 km (81 mi) line was started in 1856 and finished in ten years. The line fundamentally changed Aydın region's economy. The railway station built at the time remains an impressive structure in the city of Aydın.

=== Greek occupation ===
During the Greco-Turkish War (1919-1922), violent fighting took place in and around Aydın [Αϊδίνιο], especially in the beginning phase of the war, during the Battle of Aydın between 27 June and 4 July 1919. The civilian population of the city, principally Turkish as well as Greek, suffered heavy casualties. Neither could the city's Jewish population, 3,500-strong in 1917 go unscathed.

=== The "efe" resistance ===
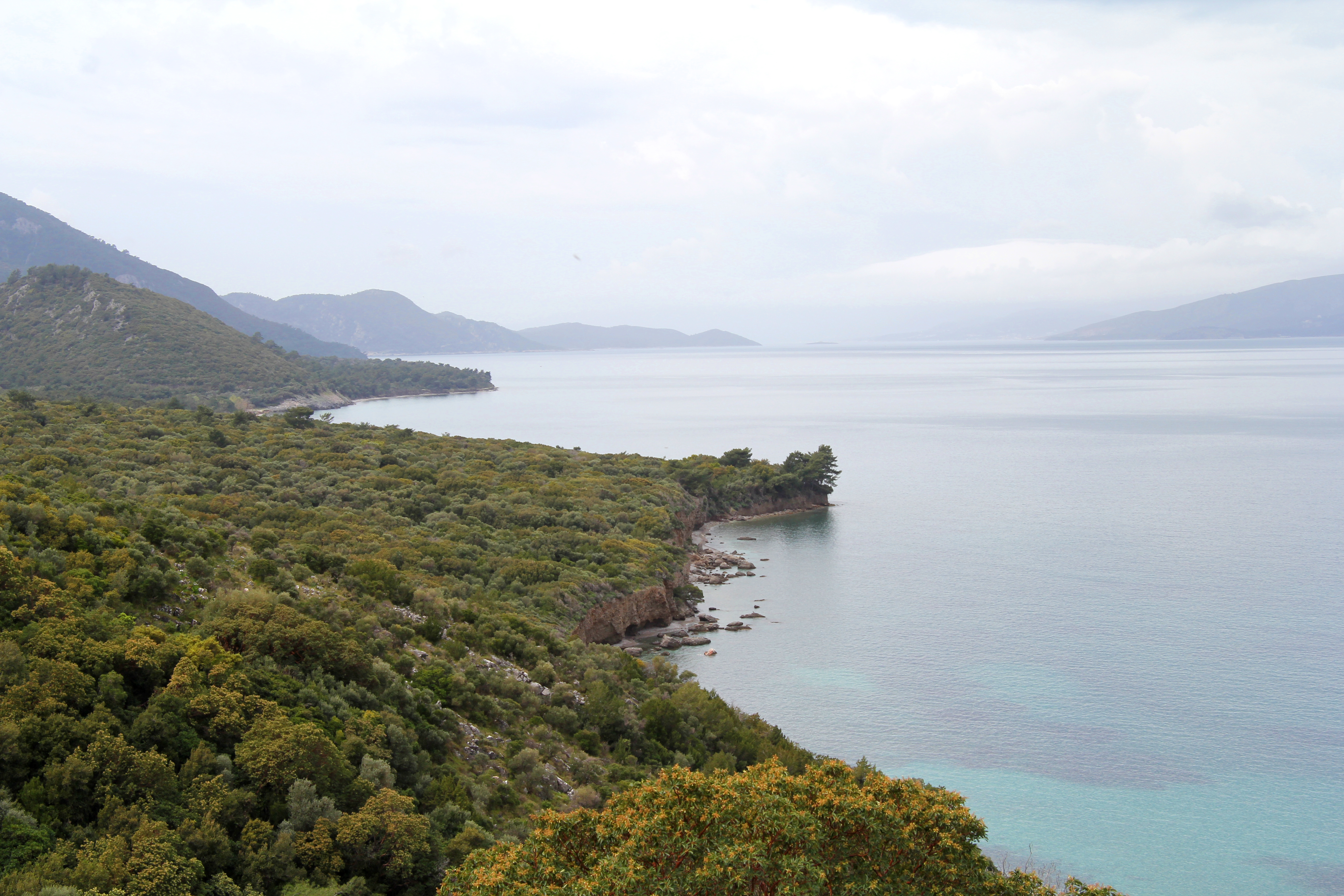
Dilek Peninsula-Büyük Menderes Delta National Park in Aydın.

Aydın remained in ruins until it was re-captured by the Turkish army on 7 September 1922. Resistance warriors such as the efe Yörük Ali, who were based in the surrounding mountains and conducted a guerrilla warfare against the Greek army, became heroes in Turkey. Following the war and the foundation of the Republic of Turkey, the Greeks of Aydın were exchanged with Muslims living in Greece under the 1923 agreement for the Population exchange between Greece and Turkey.

=== Modern Aydın ===
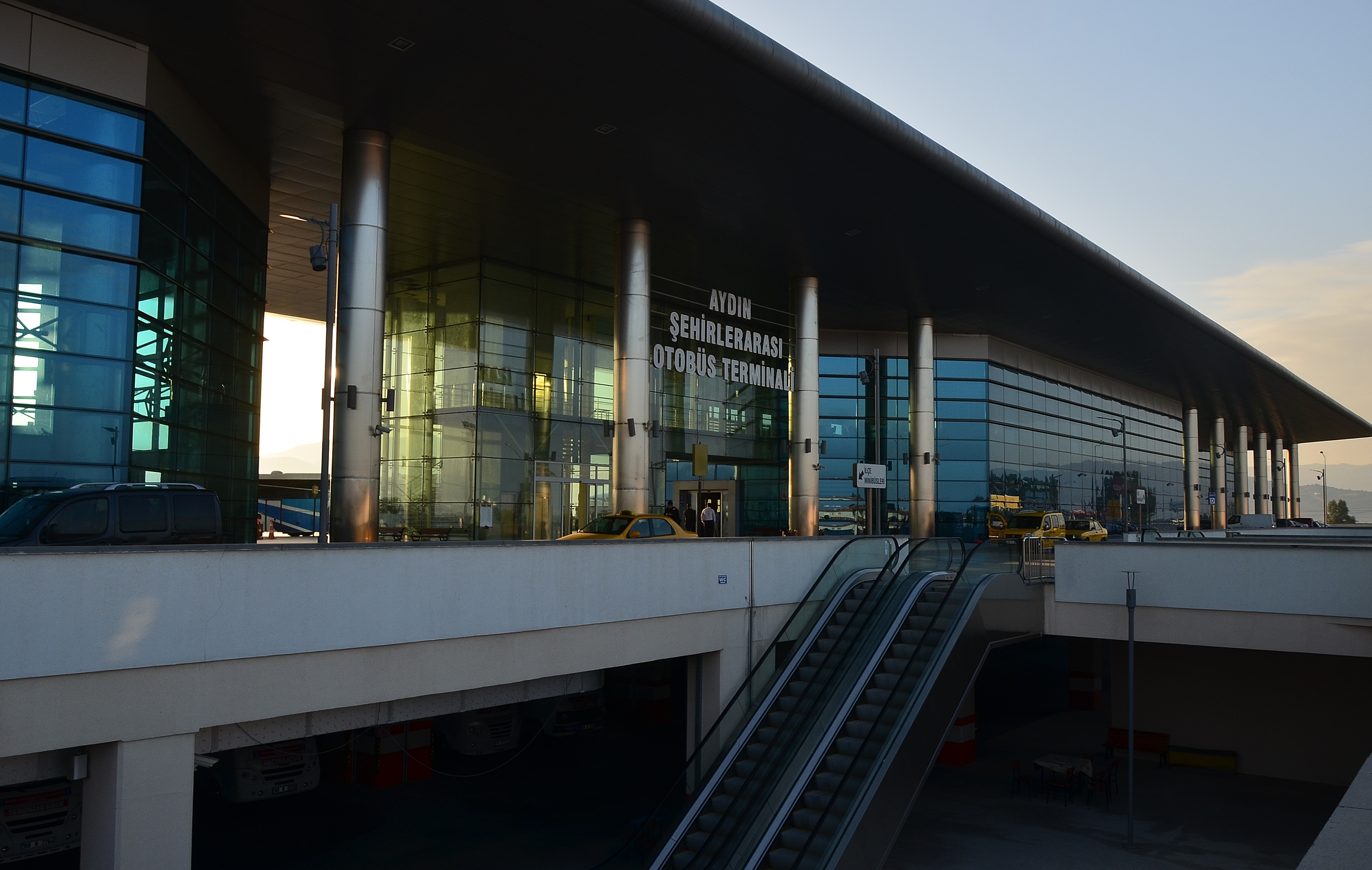
Intercity bus terminus of Aydın

Recent decades have seen Aydın going beyond its traditional role as a hub for agricultural products, and developing a diversified economy increasingly based on services. One event in this process was the opening in 1992 of Adnan Menderes University, named after a favorite son of Efeler, Aydın Adnan Menderes, Turkey's prime minister during the 1950s. The pace of the economy is determined by the city's location, at only an hour's drive from the seashore. Many residents of Aydın typically have summer houses and investments in or around such centers of tourism as Kuşadası, Güzelçamlı and Didim.

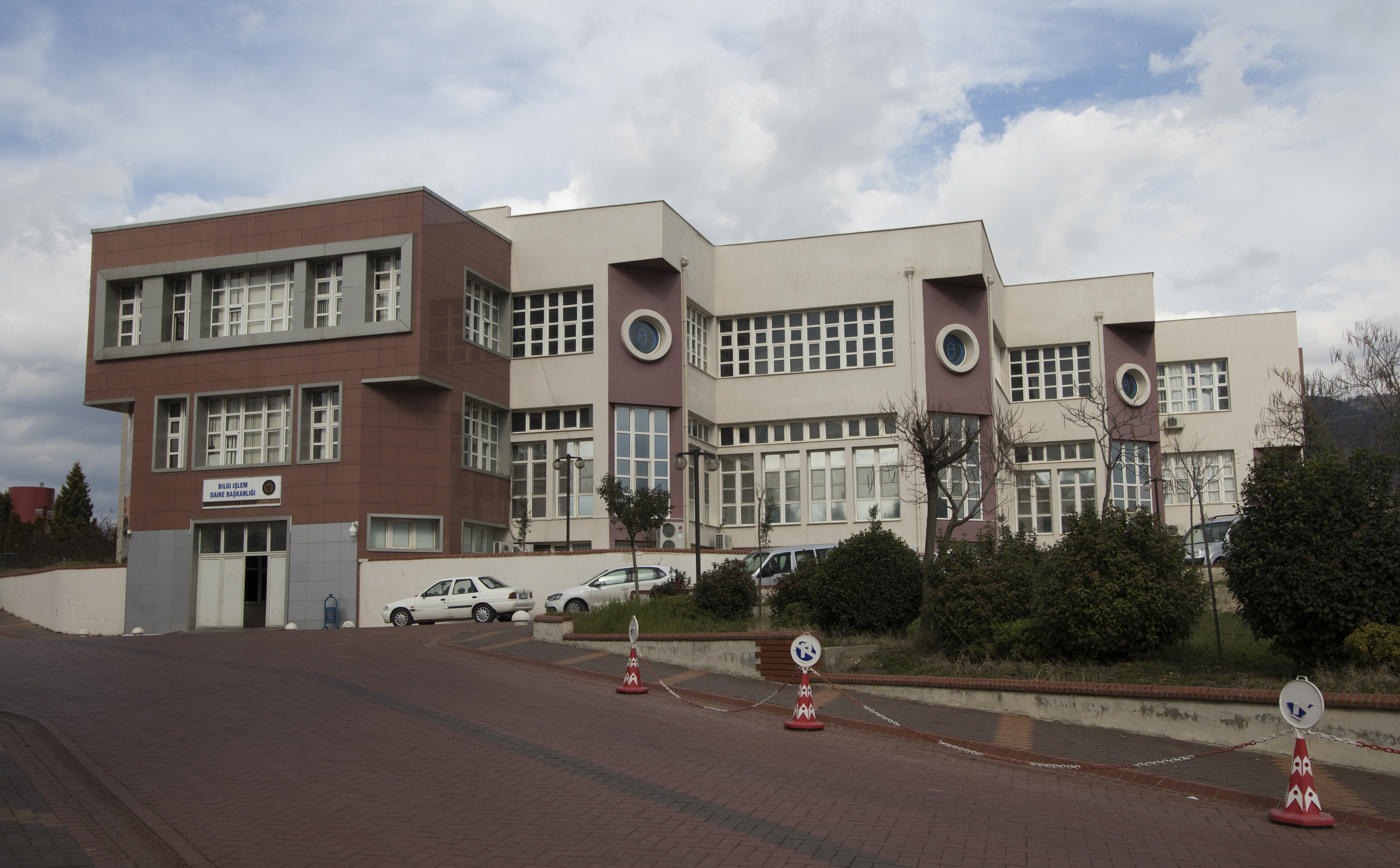
Central Library in Aydın University.

Aydın city centre is still relatively small but growing, centred on one palm-lined avenue of shops and cafes, and a maze of narrow side streets, dotted with orange trees. The people more family-oriented, so there is little night life, or cultural amenities for young people, although presumably now they have a university this will change. There are a number of mosques, high schools, dersane (private courses cramming students for the university entrance exams) and other public buildings. Like all Turkish cities Aydın is now spreading as the middle-classes are leaving their flats in the city for smarter apartments or houses slightly out of town.

== Climate ==
Aydın has a hot summer Mediterranean climate (Csa) under both the Köppen and Trewartha classification systems. Summers are very hot and dry, with highs above 35.0 °C (95.0 °F) on most summer days. Spring and fall are warm and variable, while winters are mild and quite rainy. Snowfall is rare, with the last one occurring on 2 February 2012.

Highest recorded temperature: 45.1 °C (113.2 °F) on 3 August 2021
Lowest recorded temperature: −11.0 °C (12.2 °F) on 4 January 1942

Climate data for Aydın (1991–2020, extremes 1941–2023) (elevation: 56, coordinates:37°50′25″N 27°50′16″E)
Month	Jan	Feb	Mar	Apr	May	Jun	Jul	Aug	Sep	Oct	Nov	Dec	Year
Record high °C (°F)	23.8 (74.8)	27.4 (81.3)	32.4 (90.3)	35.4 (95.7)	42.6 (108.7)	44.4 (111.9)	44.8 (112.6)	45.1 (113.2)	43.3 (109.9)	39.5 (103.1)	31.1 (88.0)	25.9 (78.6)	45.1 (113.2)
Mean daily maximum °C (°F)	13.5 (56.3)	15.2 (59.4)	18.7 (65.7)	23.2 (73.8)	28.9 (84.0)	34.2 (93.6)	37.0 (98.6)	36.6 (97.9)	32.6 (90.7)	27.0 (80.6)	20.3 (68.5)	14.7 (58.5)	25.2 (77.4)
Daily mean °C (°F)	8.2 (46.8)	9.5 (49.1)	12.3 (54.1)	16.1 (61.0)	21.2 (70.2)	26.2 (79.2)	28.7 (83.7)	28.3 (82.9)	24.0 (75.2)	19.1 (66.4)	13.5 (56.3)	9.5 (49.1)	18.1 (64.6)
Mean daily minimum °C (°F)	4.4 (39.9)	5.3 (41.5)	7.2 (45.0)	10.5 (50.9)	14.9 (58.8)	19.1 (66.4)	21.5 (70.7)	21.4 (70.5)	17.6 (63.7)	13.6 (56.5)	9.0 (48.2)	5.9 (42.6)	12.5 (54.5)
Record low °C (°F)	−11.0 (12.2)	−5.4 (22.3)	−5.0 (23.0)	−0.8 (30.6)	4.6 (40.3)	8.4 (47.1)	13.4 (56.1)	11.8 (53.2)	7.6 (45.7)	1.6 (34.9)	−4.7 (23.5)	−5.3 (22.5)	−11.0 (12.2)
Average precipitation mm (inches)	111.3 (4.38)	87.4 (3.44)	70.8 (2.79)	53.4 (2.10)	43.8 (1.72)	14.3 (0.56)	6.0 (0.24)	6.1 (0.24)	18.4 (0.72)	45.2 (1.78)	86.5 (3.41)	110.3 (4.34)	653.5 (25.73)
Average precipitation days	11.13	10.53	9.53	8.80	7.33	2.90	0.70	0.77	2.57	5.90	7.93	11.97	80.1
Average snowy days	0.33	0.17	0	0	0	0	0	0	0	0	0	0.04	0.54
Average relative humidity (%)	72.5	69.5	65.5	62.4	57.5	49.8	48.4	52.2	56	63.2	69.2	74.3	61.7
Mean monthly sunshine hours	111.6	113.0	161.2	183.0	229.4	264.0	291.4	272.8	231.0	179.8	126.0	99.2	2,262.4
Mean daily sunshine hours	3.6	4.0	5.2	6.1	7.4	8.8	9.4	8.8	7.7	5.8	4.2	3.2	6.2
Source 1: Turkish State Meteorological Service
Source 2: NOAA NCEI(humidity), Ogimet, Meteomanz(snow days 2000-2023)

== Economy ==
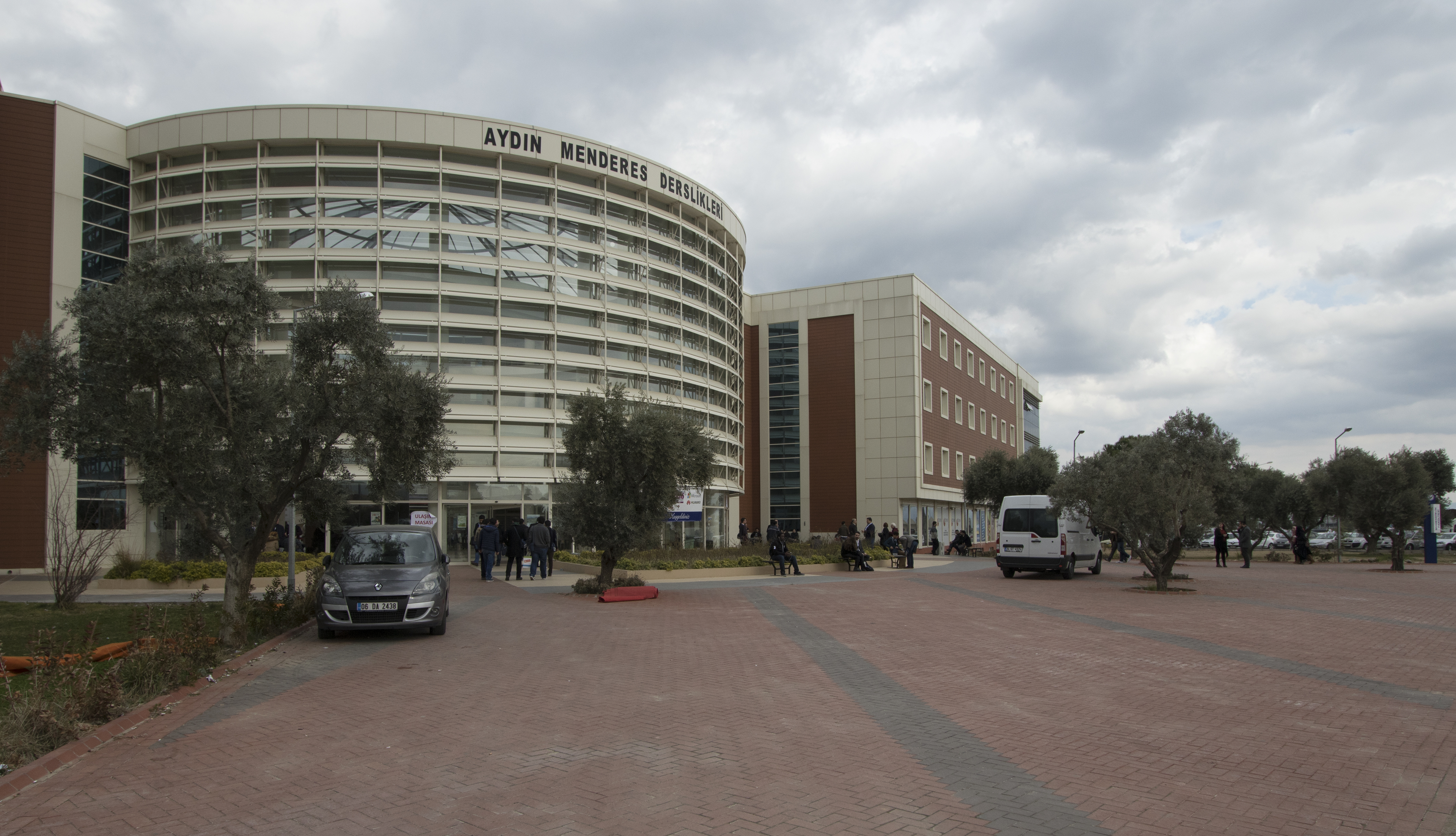
Adnan Menderes University Lecture Hall

In the 1920s, Aydın was noted for its cotton and grain production. There are many olive trees located in Aydın. Some citizens usually produce olive oil but there are also many small-scale firms which export olive oil to different countries.

== Transport ==
The construction of the six-lane İzmir-Aydın motorway shortened the journey from Aydın to İzmir, Turkey's second portuary center, to less than an hour, and less still to the international Adnan Menderes Airport.

== Culture ==
=== Sports ===
At the end of the 2018–2019 season, no sports clubs in Aydın were promoted or relegated to the next league. Aydın's only super league team, Aydın Büyükşehir Belediyespor Women's Volleyball team, played in the final in the Challenge Cup in Europe and ranked second. In football, Nazilli Belediyespor ranked 10th in the 2nd League at the end of the play-off matches. Aydın PTT SK placed 9th in the Handball Men's 1st League. Other clubs are in the 2nd, 3rd and regional leagues.

=== Places of interest ===
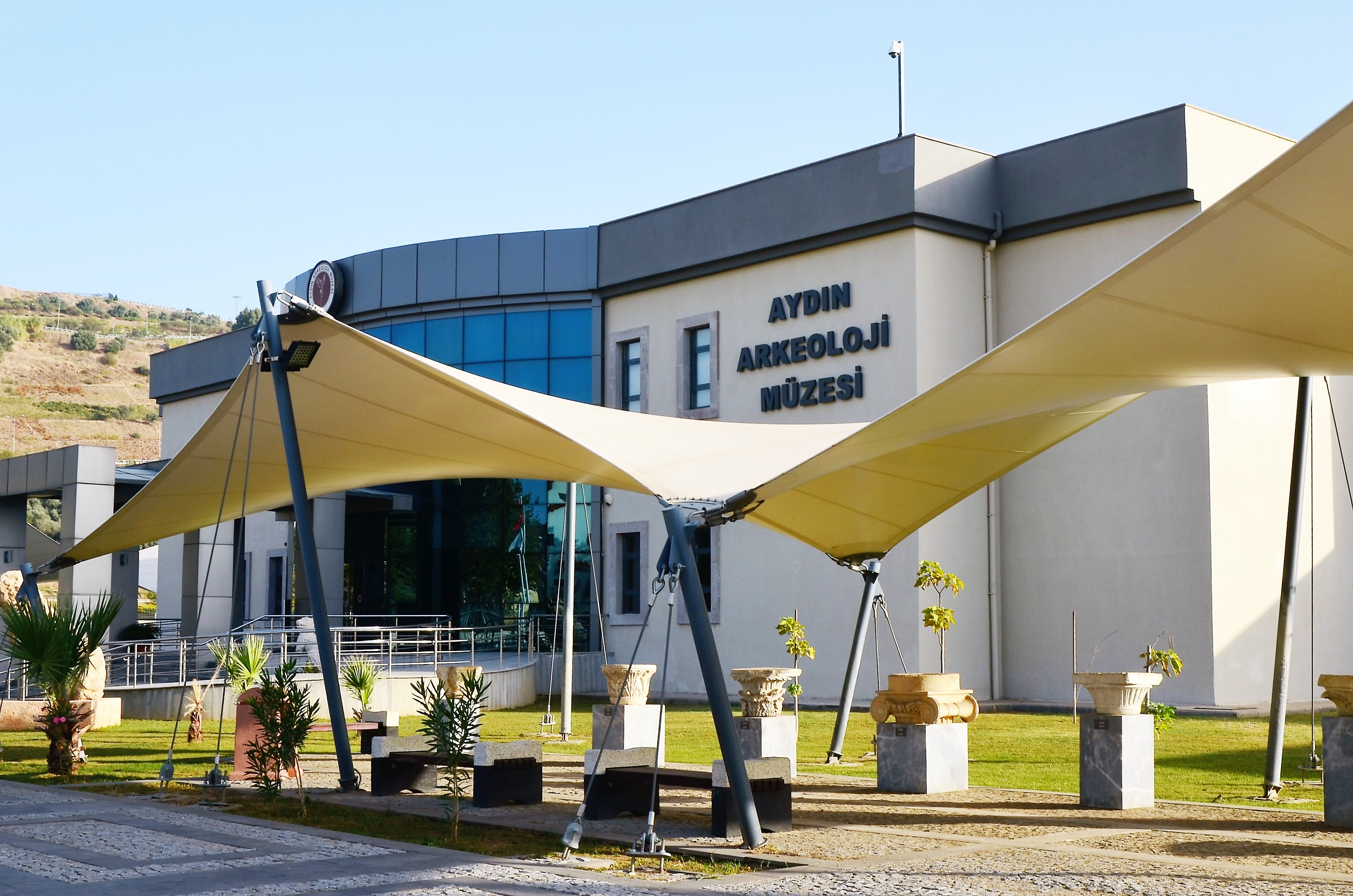
Aydın Archaeological Museum.

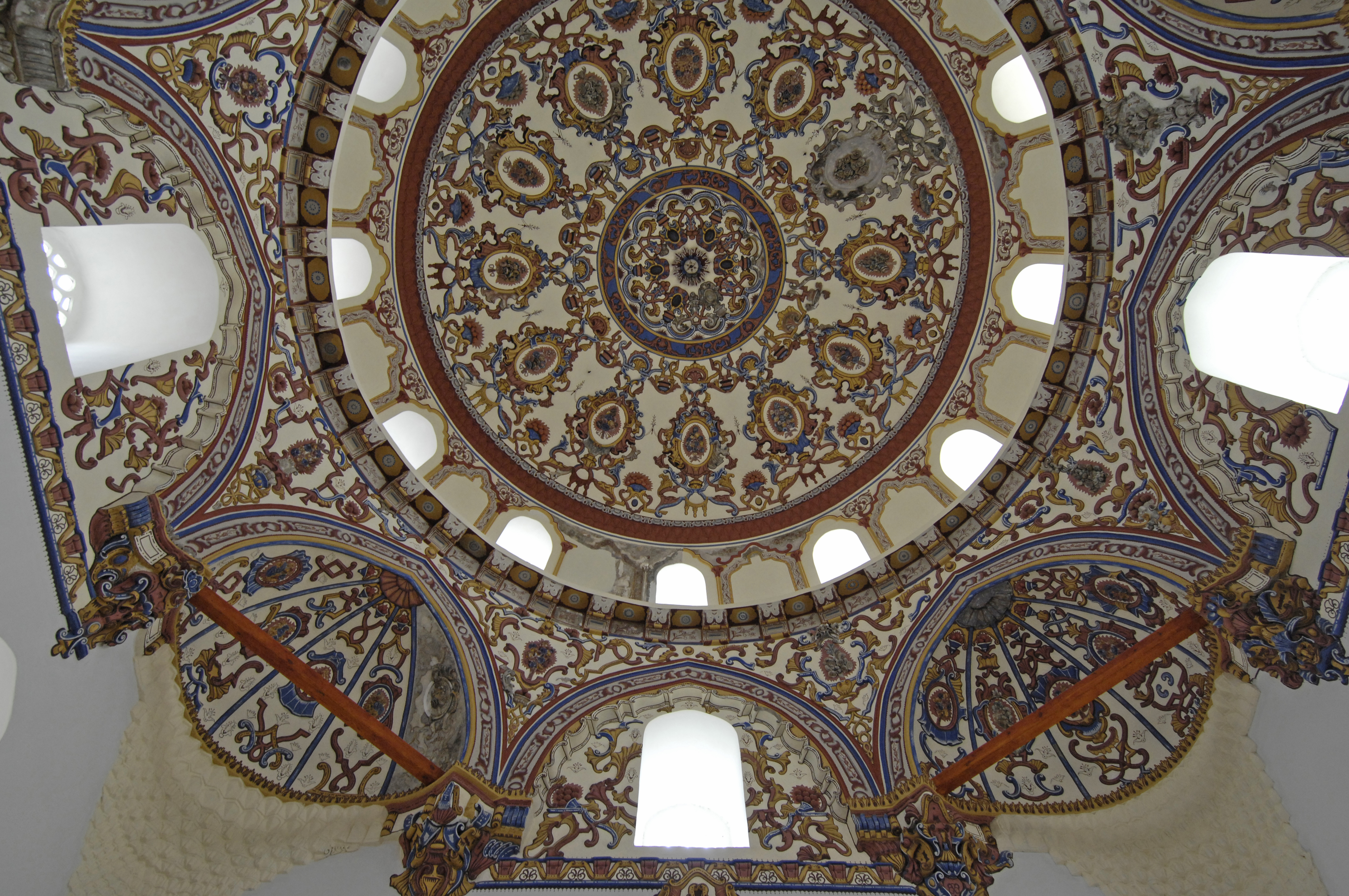
Interior of the dome of Aydin Cihanzade Mosque

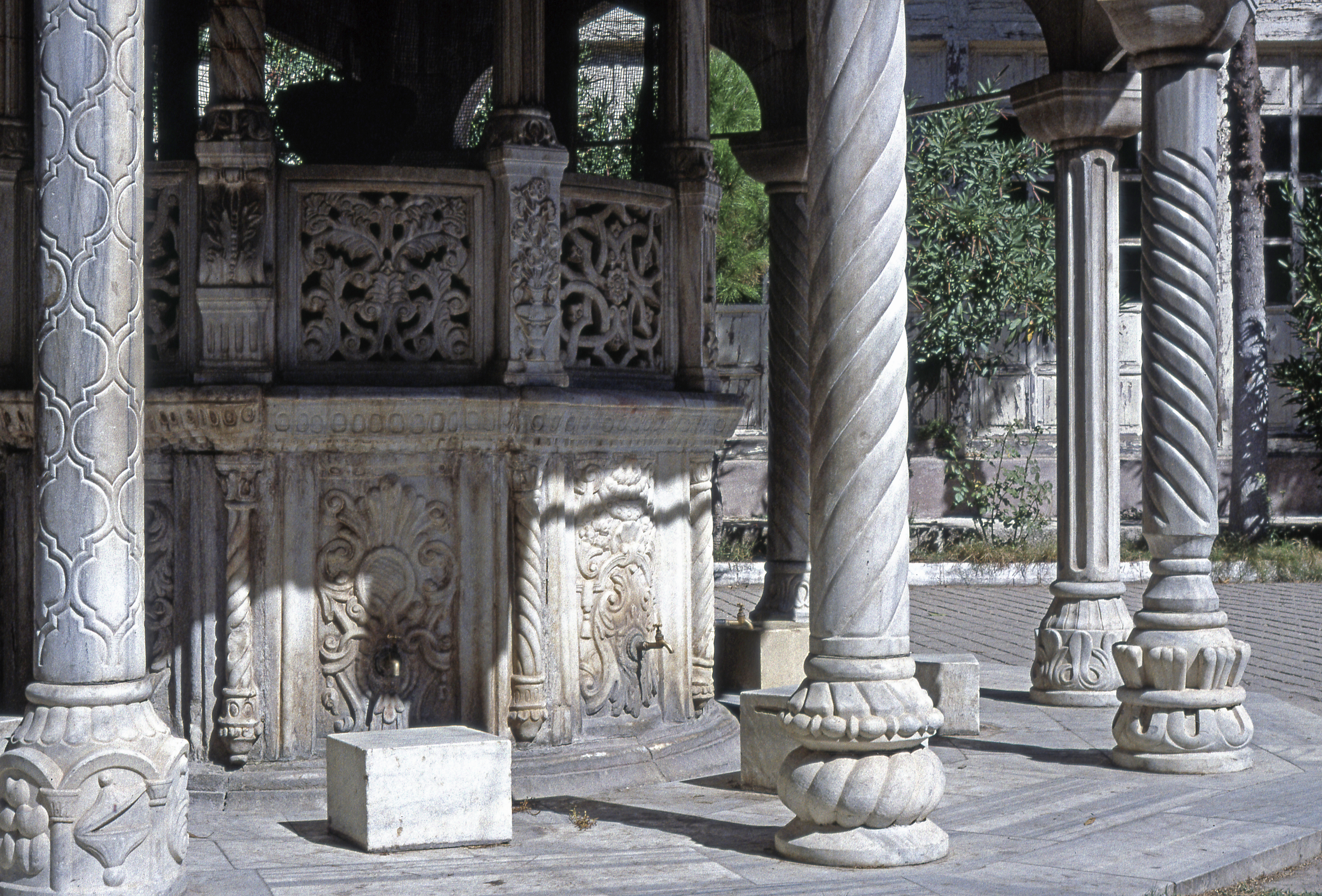
Fountain of Aydin Cihanzade Mosque

- The Ottoman period mosques of Ramazan Paşa, Süleyman Paşa and Cihanoğlu
- The Byzantine tower and fortifications above the town
- Roman era ruins (of Tralles) including a gymnasium and a theatre
- The statue of Yörük Ali Efe in the town, which was pulled down and remade after public protests that the original statue showed the efe without a moustache.
- Aydın Museum - archaeology, coinage and ethnographic collection
- Recreational resorts Pınarbaşı and Aytepe, which are connected by the Aydın Pınarbaşı-Aytepe Gondola.
- Altinkum Plaji, Didim Aydin. A vast beach stretching over coastline that has some factors of interest

== Notable people ==
=== Greco-Roman period ===
- Crates of Tralles (4th century BC) - an orator
- Sosiades (3rd century BC) - Victor of the Olympic games at the boys wrestling
- Apollonius (2nd century BC) - Greek sculptor
- Herodotos (2nd century BC) - Victor of the Pythian Games at the boys stadion
- Timotheus (2nd century BC) - Victor of the 163 Ancient Olympic Games at stadion
- Archimedes (date uncertain) - Greek grammarian
- Menecrates (1st century BC) - Greek physician
- Pythodoros (1st century BC) - Son-in-law of Mark Antony and father of Pythodorida of Pontus
- Pollio Asinius of Tralles (Πωλίων Ἀσίνιος) (1st century BC), a Greek sophist and philosopher
- Tauriscus of Tralles, a Greek sculptor
- Aphrodisius of Tralles, a Greek sculptor
- Menodorus (1st century BC), priest of Zeus Larisaeus at Tralles, was killed by Domitius Ahenobarbus on the charge of attempting a revolt on his fleet
- Jason (1st century BC) - Tragic actor
- Tryphosa, Hedea and Dionysia (1st century AD) - Young female champions and daughters of Hermesianax. Their father erected a monument at Delphi for his daughters.
- Dionysocles, Greek orator
- Damasus Scombrus, Greek orator
- Artemidorus of Tralles (1st century AD) - Victor of the Olympic games at the Pankration and wrestling.
- Thessalus (1st century AD) - physician and early adherent to the Methodic school of medicine.
- Phlegon (2nd century AD) - Greek historian under Hadrian
- Munatius (2nd century AD) - Greek orator and teacher of Herodes Atticus
- Anthemius (c. 474-c. 534) - Greek professor of geometry and architect, co-builder of Haghia Sophia
- Amphiclea (4th century) - wife of Prohaeresius
- Alexander - (6th century) - physician
- Asclepius - (6th century) - student of Ammonius Hermiae, writer and philosopher

=== Ottoman period ===
- Atçalı Kel Mehmet Efe (1780–1830), zeybek and rebel leader
- Emmanouil Farlekas (1877–1958), Greek music teacher and writer of ecclesiastical music books
- Chrysostomos II (1880–1968), archbishop of Athens
- Eftychia Papagianopoulou (1893–1972), Greek lyricist
- Yörük Ali Efe (1895 –1951), warlord in the Ottoman Empire and zeybek during the Greco-Turkish War
- Elli Sougioultzoglou-Seraidari (1899–1998), Greek photographer
- Adnan Menderes (1899–1961), Turkish prime minister
- Michalis Souyioul (1906–1958), Greek composer of light music
- Dido Sotiriou (1909–2004), Greek novelist, journalist and playwright
- Sadık Giz (1911–1979), Turkish politician and sports executive
- Minos Argyrakis (1919–1998), Greek painter, sketcher and scenic designer
- Dario Moreno (1921–1968), Turkish-Jewish singer, composer, lyricist and guitarist

=== Turkish Republic ===
- Rıdvan Dilmen (born 1962), football player
- Gökhan Kırdar (born 1970), musician and film score composer
- Osman Özköylü (born 1971), football player
- Yeşim Büber (born 1977), actress
- Ulaş Güler (born 1980), football player
- Evren Özyiğit (born 1986), football player
- Ahmet İlhan Özek (born 1988), football player

== Twin towns – sister cities ==
- Bugulma, Russia
- Montereau-Fault-Yonne, France

== See also ==
- Efeler
- Efe (zeibek)
- Camel wrestling
- Battle of Aydın

== Sources ==
- Günter Dinhobl; Ralf Roth (2008). Across the Borders: Financing the World's Railways in the Nineteenth and Twentieth Centuries. Ashgate Publishing. ISBN 978-0-7546-6029-3.
- Blue Guide, Turkey, The Aegean and Mediterranean Coasts (ISBN 978-0-393-30489-3), pp. 353–54.
- Richard Talbert, Barrington Atlas of the Greek and Roman World (ISBN 0-691-03169-X), p. 61.
