= Salavatlı =

- Neighbourhood
- Location in Turkey Salavatlı (Turkey Aegean)
- Coordinates: 37°53′N 28°06′E
- Country: Turkey
- Province: Aydın
- District: Sultanhisar
- Elevation: 190 m (620 ft)
- Population (2022): 1,204
- Time zone: UTC+3 (TRT)
- Postal code: 09470
- Area code: 0256

Salavatlı (formerly: Kurucular) is a neighbourhood of the municipality and district of Sultanhisar, Aydın Province, Turkey. Its population is 1,204 (2022). Before the 2013 reorganisation, it was a town (belde). It is situated to the north of Turkish state highway D.320 which connects Aydın to Sultanhisar. The distance to Sultanhisar is 8 kilometres (5.0 mi) and to Aydın is 30 kilometres (19 mi).

The settlement was founded in 1730 during Ottoman Empire era. In 1972 it was declared a seat of township. Major economic activity is farming. Main crops are figs, strawberries, olives, citrus and cotton. The ancient site of Acharaca is nearby.
