= Emmanouil Farlekas =

Emmanouil I. Farlekas (Aydın, 1877 – Athens, 1958) was a music teacher, prothonary of the archbishopric of Athens and writer of ecclesiastical music books.

== Biography ==
Farlekas was born in 1877 in Aydın, Asia Minor, where he was taught ecclesiastical music. He worked for a short time as a teacher in his birthplace and he was later appointed chief secretary of the metropolitan of Ilioupoli and Theira, Tarasios. After Tarasios's death, he acted as chief secretary of the metropolis of Ephesos and in 1922, as a result of the Asia Minor Catastrophe he fled to Greece, where he was appointed prothonary of the archbishopric of Athens by the contemporary archbishop, Chrysostomos.

He also acted as professor at the Conservatory of Athens and was a profound connoisseur of ecclesiastical music and of the Typikon. He died in June 1958 in Athens.

== Writings ==
He was also an author of books on Byzantine ecclesiastical music. His main work is considered to be the "Συνοπτικό Εκκλησιαστικό Ημερολόγιο" (Concise Ecclesiastical Calendar), which he was publishing from 1923 to 1951, when its publication was taken over by the Church of Greece. Other works of his are the "Πεντηκοστάριον" (Pentecostarion), the "Τριώδιον" (Triodion) and the "Αγία και Μεγάλη Εβδομάς" (Holy and Great Week).
