= Hedea of Tralles =

Hedea of Tralles (Ancient Greek: Ἡδεα) was an Ancient Greek athlete and musician.

She was one of the daughters of Hermesianax of Tralles (Ancient Greek: Ἑρμησιάναξ). Her grandfather was named Dionysios (Ancient Greek: Διονύσιος).

Hedea, together with her sisters Tryphosa (Ancient Greek: Τρυφῶσα) and Dionysia (Ancient Greek: Διονυσία) were young athletes and champions. They were citizens of Tralles and of Corinth in the 1st century AD. Hedea won the race for war chariots of the Isthmian games, the stadion of the Nemean games and of the Sicyon and the kithara-contest for children in Athens. Her father erected a monument at Delphi for his daughters dedicated to the Pythian Apollo. The inscription provides the earliest known names of females victors in non equestrian sports.
