= Menecrates of Tralles =

Menecrates of Tralles (Greek: Μενεκράτης ὁ Τραλλιανός, /məˈnɛkrətiːz/), probably born in Tralles (Asia Minor), was a Greek physician during the 1st century BC.

He was captured by the Romans in one of their battles in the Middle East and later sold as a slave to Quintus Manneus. He seems to have been a successful practitioner in the Manneii family and for this reason he was set free with the name of Lucius Manneus. He was educated in Rome where he probably met Asclepiades of Bithynia. Menecrates is well known for the epigraph dug up in Massavetere, Caggiano now located in the National Archaeological Museum of Volcei (Buccino). The epigraph is written both in Latin and Ancient Greek and expresses the most important aspect of his life, the wine therapy and the love for Maxima Sadria.

== Bibliography ==
- Luigi Vecchio, Menekrates di Tralles oinodotes physikòs, in Synergia. Festschrift für Friederich Krinzinger, hrsg. Von B. Brandt – V. Gassner – S. Landstätter, Wien 2005, pp. 367-375.
- Alessandro Cristofori, Menecrate di tralles un medico greco nella lucania romana, in Giovanna De Sensi Sestito (a cura di), L'arte di Asclepio. Medici e malattie in età antica Rubettino editore, Soveria Mannelli (Catanzaro) 2008, pp. 71–104.
- Giuseppe Lauriello, Menecrate di Tralles, il medico che curava col vino ed altre memorie, Booksprint, 2014, pp.196.
