= Hermesianax of Tralles =

Hermesianax of Tralles (Ancient Greek: Ἑρμησιάναξ) was a citizen of Tralles and of Corinth in 1st century AD. His father was named Dionysios (Ancient Greek: Διονύσιος). His three daughters Tryphosa (Ancient Greek: Τρυφῶσα), Hedea (Ancient Greek: Ἡδεα) and Dionysia (Ancient Greek: Διονυσία) were young athletes and champions.

Tryphosa won the stadion of the Pythian games and of the Isthmian games. Hedea won the race for war chariots of the Isthmian games, the stadion of the Nemean games and of the Sicyon and the kithara-contest for children in Athens. Dionysia won the stadion at Asklepian games at Epidaurus and in another game, but due to damage at the inscription researchers could not find out in which.

He erected a monument at Delphi for his daughters dedicated to the Pythian Apollo.

The inscription provides the earliest known names of females victors in non equestrian sports.
