= Acharaca =

Village of ancient Lydia, Anatolia

- Ἀχάρακα (Ancient Greek); Akharaka (Turkish)
- Location within Turkey
- 37°54′N 28°06′E
- Type: Settlement
- Location: Salavatlı, Aydın Province, Turkey
- Region: Lydia

Acharaca (Ancient Greek: Ἀχάρακα) was a village of ancient Lydia, Anatolia on the road from Tralles (modern Aydın, Turkey) to Nysa on the Maeander, with a Ploutonion or a temple of Pluto, and a cave, named Charonium (Ancient Greek: Χαρώνειον άντρον), where the sick were healed under the direction of the priests. There is some indication that it once bore the name Charax (Χάραξ), but that name may have belonged to Tralles. Its location is now the site of the modern town of Salavatlı. Recoveries from archaeological excavations are housed at the Aydın Archaeological Museum.

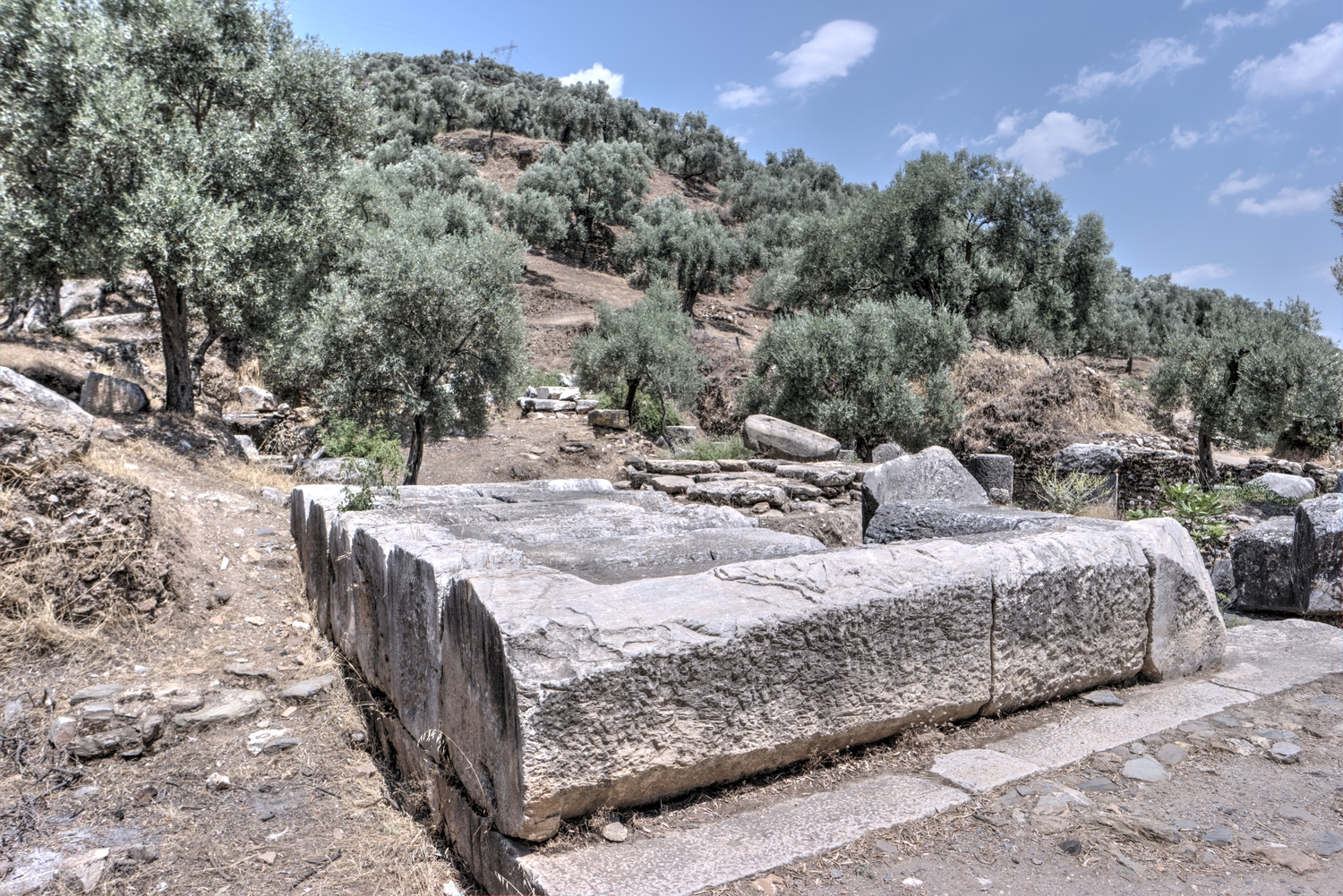
Acharaca, the sanctuary of Pluto and Kore

The city was founded by Antiochus I Soter in the first half of the 3rd century BC.

The city had an oracle of Pluto and Kore (Persephone) at Acharaca. A large grove, a Doric temple (remains of which survive), and a cave called the Charonium, were the seat of the oracle. Strabo noted that "The sick resort thither, and live in the village near the cave, among experienced priests, who sleep at night in the open air and direct the mode of cure by their dreams. The priests invoke the gods to cure the sick, and frequently take them into the cave, where they remain in quiet without food for several days. Sometimes the sick themselves observe their own dreams, but apply to the priests to interpret them. To others the place is interdicted and fatal."

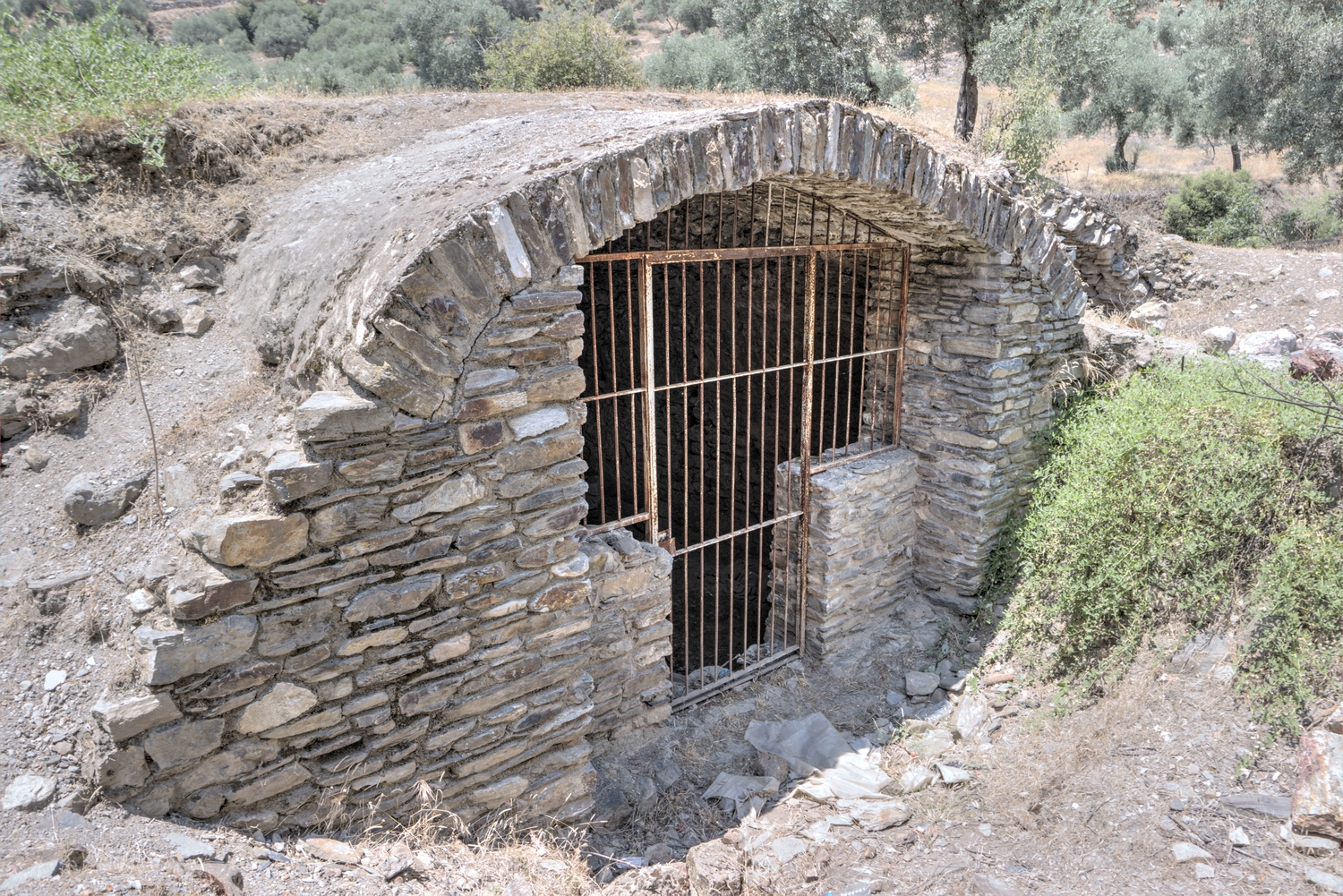
Acharaca, the sanctuary of Pluto and Kore

Strabo also describes a festival held at Acharaca. An annual festival, to which there is general resort, is celebrated at Acharaca, and at the time particularly are to be seen and heard those who frequent it, conversing about cures performed there. During this feast the young men of the gymnasium and the ephebi, naked and anointed with oil, carry off a bull by stealth at midnight, and hurry it away into the cave. It is then let loose, and after proceeding a short distance falls down and expires.
