= Aydın Archaeological Museum =

Museum in Turkey

Coordinates: 37°50′48″N 27°51′45″E

- Aydın Arkeoloji Müzesi
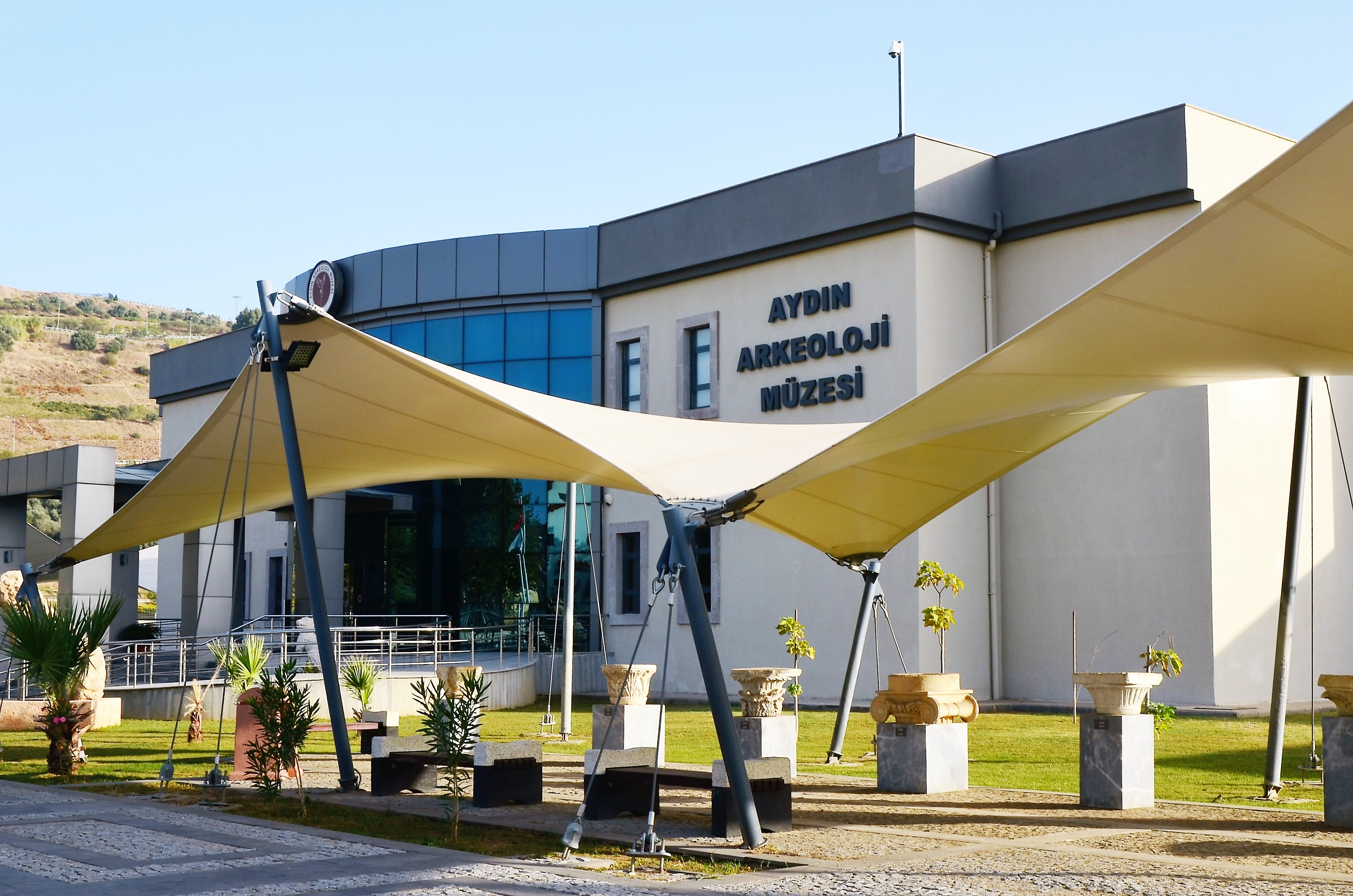

- Location of Aydın Archaeological Museum in Turkey
- Established: February 16, 1959; 67 years ago
- Location: Ilıcabaşı Mah., Müze Bulvarı 4, Efeler, Aydın, Turkey
- Type: Archaeological
- Collection size: 11,000 archeological; 4,000 ethnographic; 45,000 coins
- Owner: Ministry of Culture and Tourism

Aydın Archaeological Museum (Turkish: Aydın Arkeoloji Müzesi) is in Aydın, western Turkey. Established in 1959, it contains numerous statues, tombs, columns and stone carvings from the Hellenistic, Roman, Byzantine, Seljuk and Ottoman periods, unearthed in ancient cities such as Alinda, Alabanda, Amyzon, Harpasa, Magnesia on the Maeander, Mastaura, Myus, Nisa, Orthosia, Piginda, Pygela and Tralleis. The museum also has a section devoted to ancient coin finds.

== Background ==
Artifacts discovered in the region of Aydın were initially stored and so protected in the Community Center (Turkish: Halkevi) of the city. In 1950, the collected objects were transferred to the Undersecretariat of Treasury. The museum was formed as an office on February 16, 1959, and it gained the status of a directorate on February 17, 1969.

The museum moved to its new building on April 23, 1973. In the beginning, ethnographical items and archaeological artifacts were exhibited together in the same building. In the following years, the number of artifacts obtained from the scientific archaeological excavations at the sites of ancient civilizations around the city increased. The need of a new and bigger museum building became inevitable as the available space of the showrooms, warehouses and service units could not meet contemporary museology norms anymore. In 2000, the museum underwent a mandatory redesign. However, the lack of an expansion option led to the elaboration of a project for a new museum's building.

The project started in 2000, however, it could not be realized due to lack of financial sources. On May 25, 2011, Ministry of Culture and Tourism took over the project. Cost ₺8 million (approx. US$4.5 million), the construction completed in about one year after the tender was held. Opened on August 17, 2012, the museum is built at Ilıcabaşı neighborhood in downtown Aydın on an area of 15,769 m^{2} (3.897 acres). It is a two-story building with a basement. The ground floor consists of an exhibition hall of 1,340 m^{2} (14,400 sq ft) and administrative offices. A hall of 530 m^{2} (5,700 sq ft) reserved for temporary exhibitions, a children's workshop and a multi-purpose auditorium with 130-seat capacity are situated at the first floor. It has a backyard serving as an open-air museum.

== Exhibits ==
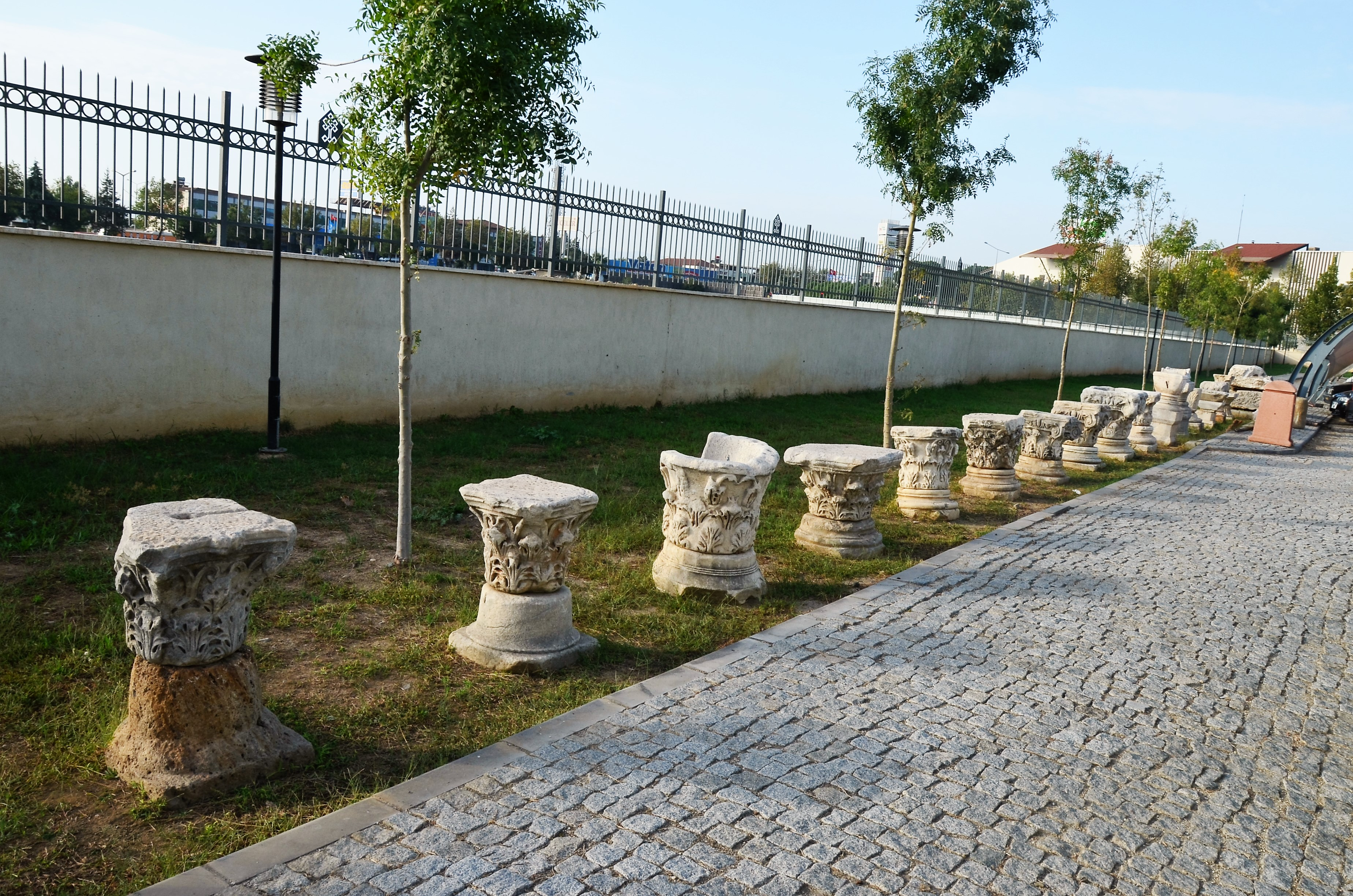
Column capitals of Ancient Roman period

The plan of Aydın Archaeological Museum is based on the exhibition of artifacts primarily from Tralleis (ancient Aydın), Magnesia, Alabanda, Nysa Archaic Panionium, Kadıkalesi (Anai), Tepecik Tumulus. In addition, archaeological objects obtained from excavations at Alinda, Amyzon, Piginda, Harpasa, Mastaura, Acharaca, Pygale and Orthosia are also on display. The verses of Seikilos epitaph, of which original is at the National Museum of Denmark in Copenhagen, welcomes the visitors at the museum entrance. There are around 11,000 archeological and 4,000 ethnographic artifacts as well as a collection of 45,000 numismatics items registered in Aydın Museum, which is one of the country's top ten museums. There are some 3,000 articles on display in the museum.

Five-minute introductions, displayed on TV sets in the museum sections, are offered to the visitors in addition to a 15-minute-long presentation about the museum and the archaeological sites, which is given to groups at the entrance.

Tepecik Tumulus Section

In this section, finds from the prehistoric age are on display, which were unearthed at Tepecik Tumulus in Karakollar, Çine. These are earthenware idols, bone tools, stone axes as well as arrowheads, cutting and drilling tools made of flint and obsidian at Late Chalcolithic, Early, Middle, and Late Bronze Age. Also terracotta seal imprints of Hittites from the Late Bronze Age are found in this section. These seal imprints manifest their existence and influence in western Anatolia.

Archaic Panionium Section

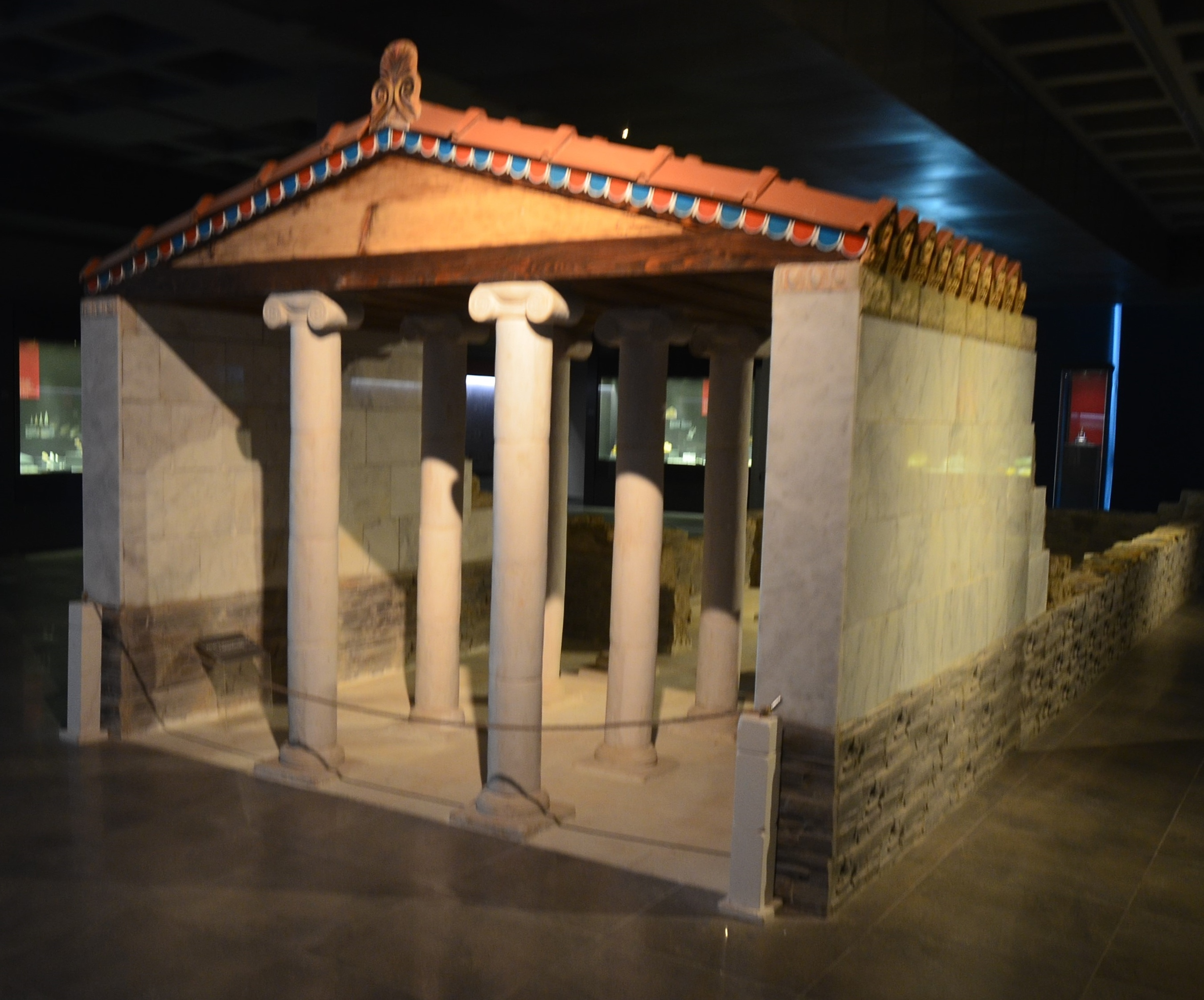
A mockup of the actual ancient building consisting of the Archaic Panionium Sanctuary and the Ionian League's Meeting Hall

This section contains artifacts from the Archaic Panionium Sanctuary at Melia on the top of Mycale located in Davutlar town of Kuşadası, Aydın. Important objects on display are terracotta antefixes, small statues of soldiers and bronze arrowheads. There is also a mockup in 1/3-scale of the actual ancient building consisting of the Archaic Panionium Sanctuary and the Ionian League's Meeting Hall.

Kadıkalesi (Anaia) Section

A small bronze Hittite statue is exhibited in a special showcase as an important find in addition to the terracotta pots and pans, stone axes and loom weights, all found during the excavations in a tumulus at Kadıkalesi in Kuşadası, Aydın. Furthermore, vitrified ornamental ceramics, jewellery, hilts, belt buckle, figures and reliefs of saints made of ivory dating back to 12th and 13th century as well as collection of lead seal prints from the Byzantine Era.

Alabanda Hall

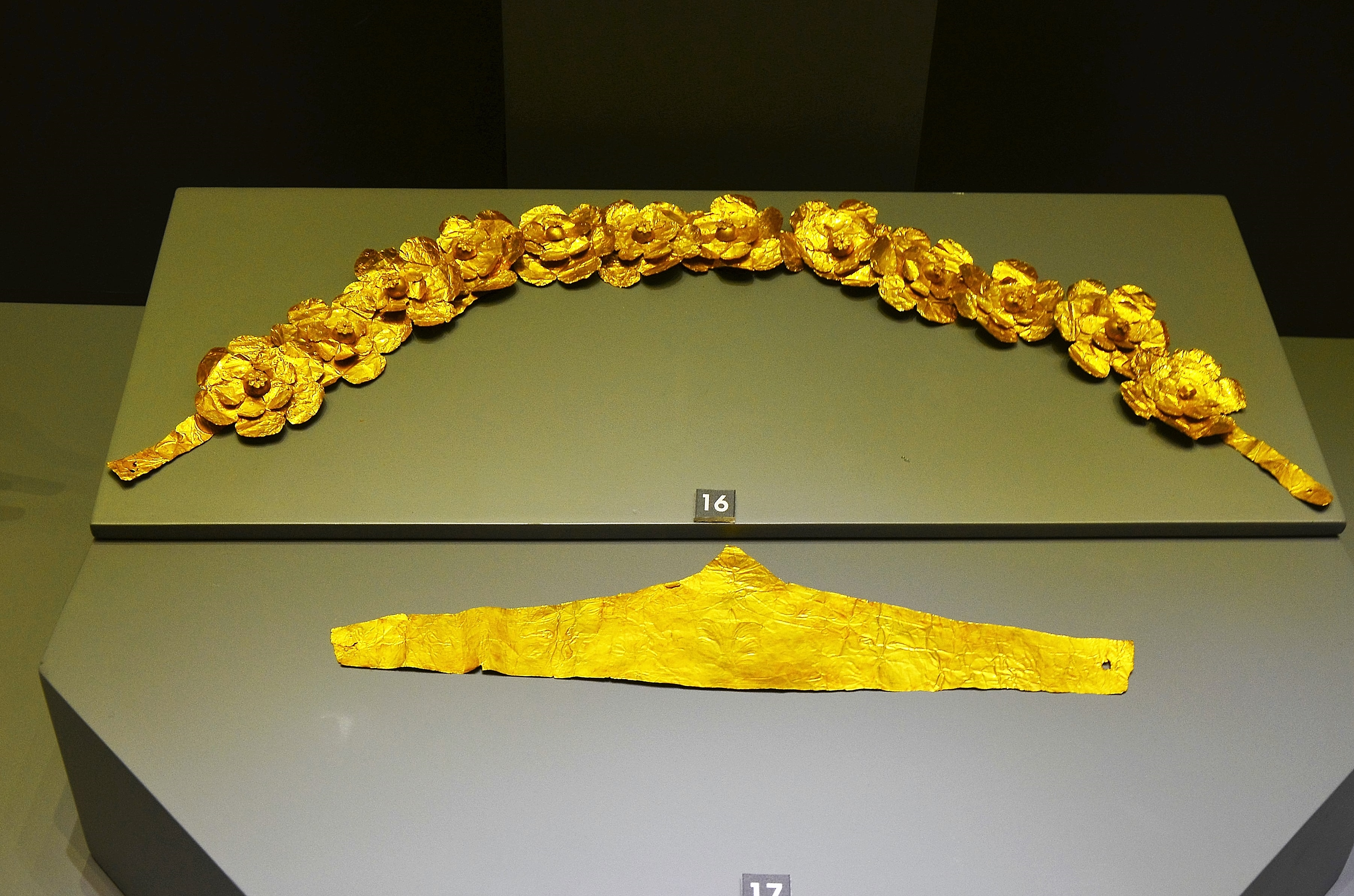
Hellenistic period golden belt (top) and Ancient Roman period golden headband-shaped diadem (bottom)

In this hall, earthenware objects, oil lamps, glassware, golden crowns, diadems and various jewellery are on display, which were obtained from excavations at Alabanda near Doğanyurt, Çine in Aydın Province. A statue of Roman emperor Augustus (reigned 27 BC – 14 AD) is situated also here.

Tralles Hall

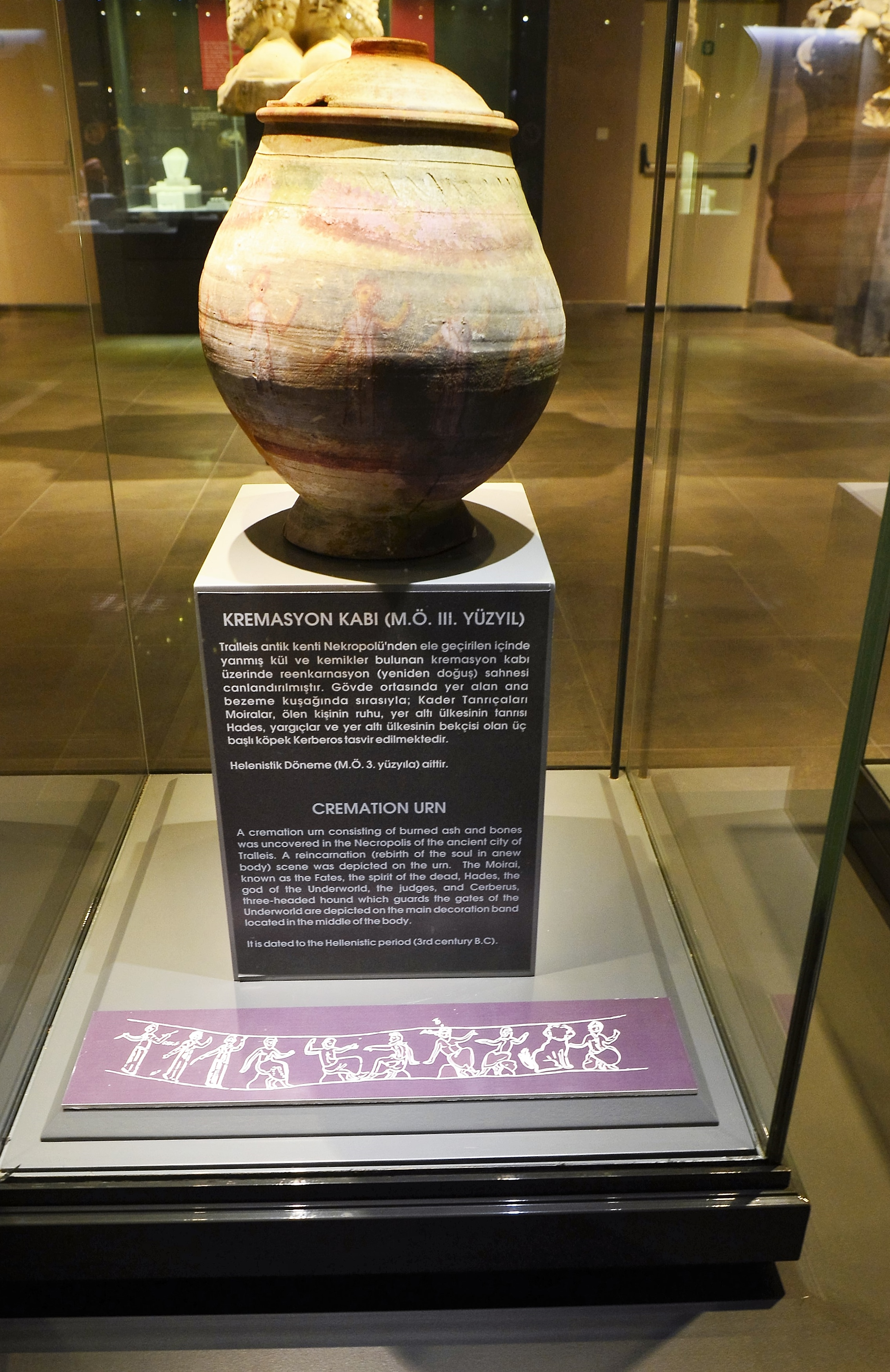
Ancient Roman cremation urn with depiction

This hall exhibits the finest examples of the sculptures from the Hellenistic period and the Roman period in Tralles, what is today downtown Aydın. In addition, artefacts such as earthenware objects, oil lamps, rhytons, scent bottles, glassware, golden diadems, rings, earrings and various other jewellery as well as terracotta children's toys are on display. The most important objects of the museum are small sculptures of Eros made of painted terracotta and a cremation urn decorated with incarnation motifs depicting destiny's gods Moirai, the soul of the dead person, chthonic god of the underworld Hades, the judges of the underworld and the three-headed guard dog Cerberus of Hades.

Magnesia Hall

Terracotta cups and containers, oil lamps, figures, various sculpture examples, ring stones, jewellery examples and ivory objects, which were unearthed during excavations at Magnesia on the Maeander near Germencik, Aydın, are exhibited in the hall. Other noteworthy objects are helmets depicted with the figure of Scylla, which is mentioned in Homer's Odyssey XII, Odysseus, statues of the Olympian gods Apollo and Hermes.

Nysa Hall

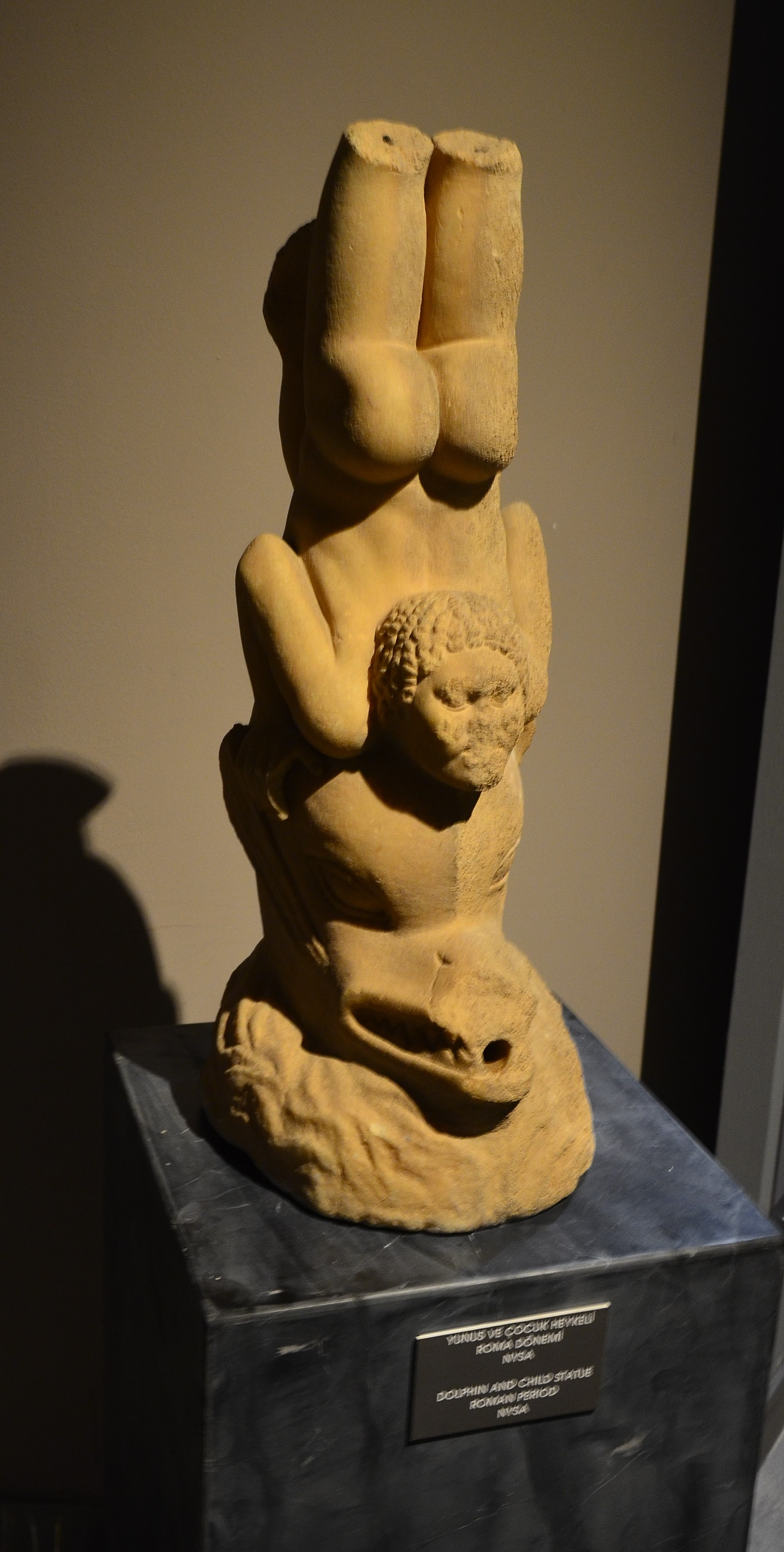
Ancient Roman statue of a child with dolphin found in Nysa

In this hall, marble busts, capitals, sculptures from the Roman amphitheatre's downstage in Nysa, steles with reliefs and the sculpture of a child on a dolphin are on display, which were found in Nysa on the Maeander near today's Sultanhisar, Aydın.

Mosaics Hall

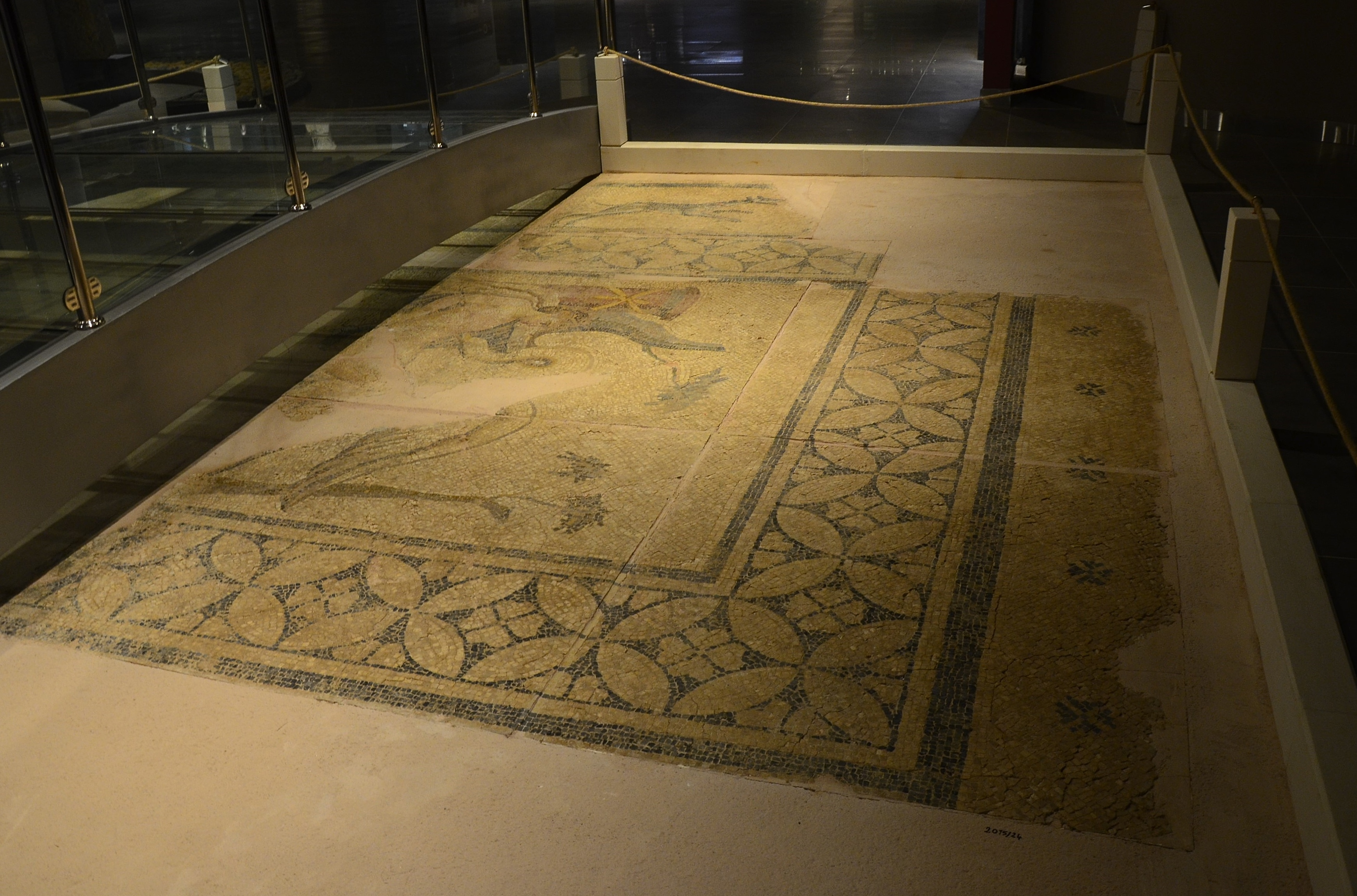
Mosaics of an Ancient Roman villa in Orthosia

Mosaics, discovered on the floor of a Roman villa from the 2nd century BC at the ancient city of Orthosia at Donduran village of Yenipazar, Aydın, consist of four main panels with borders made in opus tessellatum. The borders are enriched with various animal figures and typical Roman geometric motifs. There is also an interactive wall display application showing a 3D-scene of gladiator fight inspired from the gladiator figures on the mosaics of Orthosia.

Stone artifacts Hall

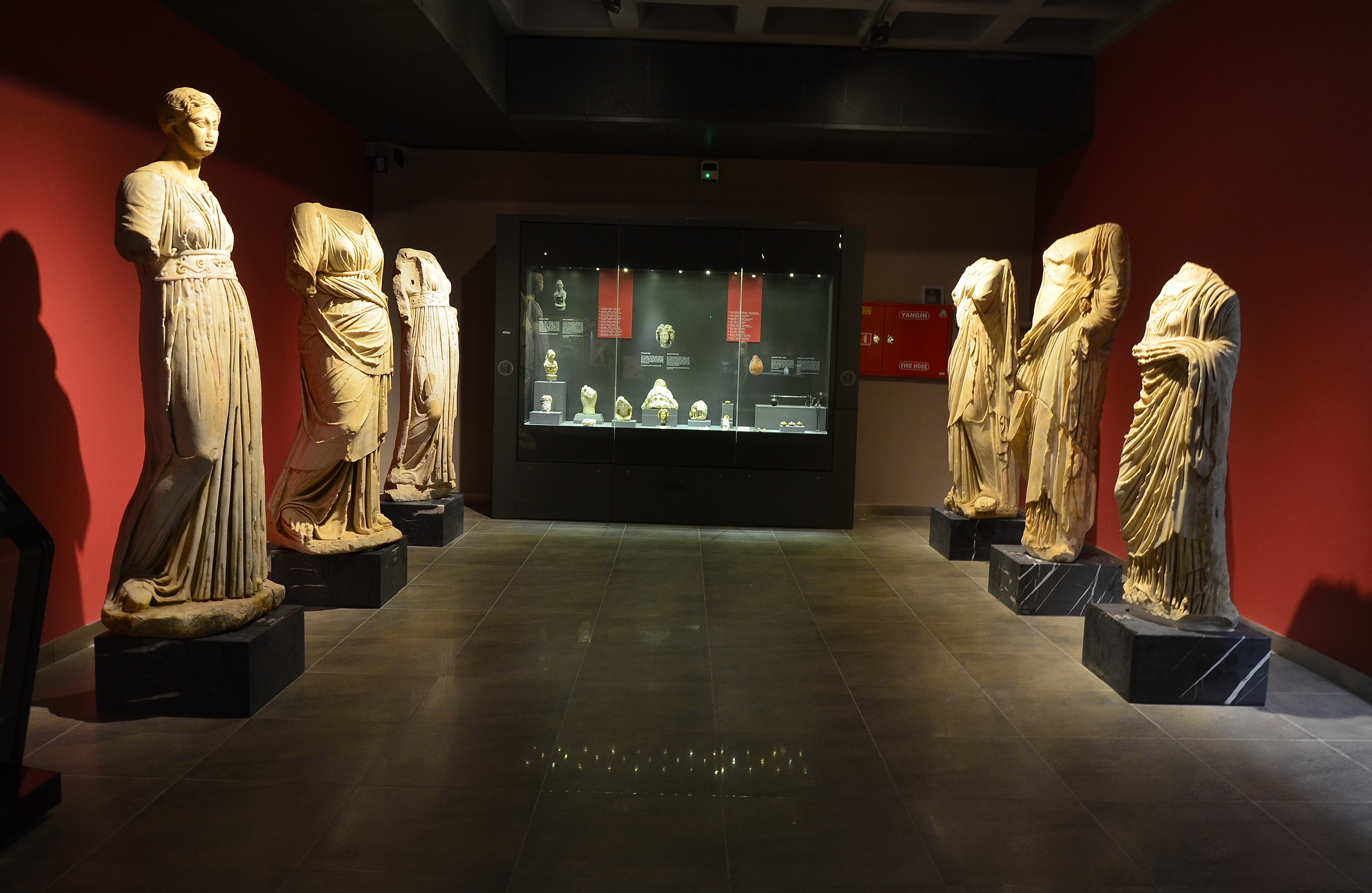
Ancient Roman statues of woman

The hall displays sculptures, reliefs, busts, capitals, altars as well as sarcophagi, burial urns and steles related to burial rituals from various eras, which were discovered at ancient cities and settlements around Aydın. A statue of Pan, the god of the wild, shepherds and flocks, is situated also here.

Numismatics collection section

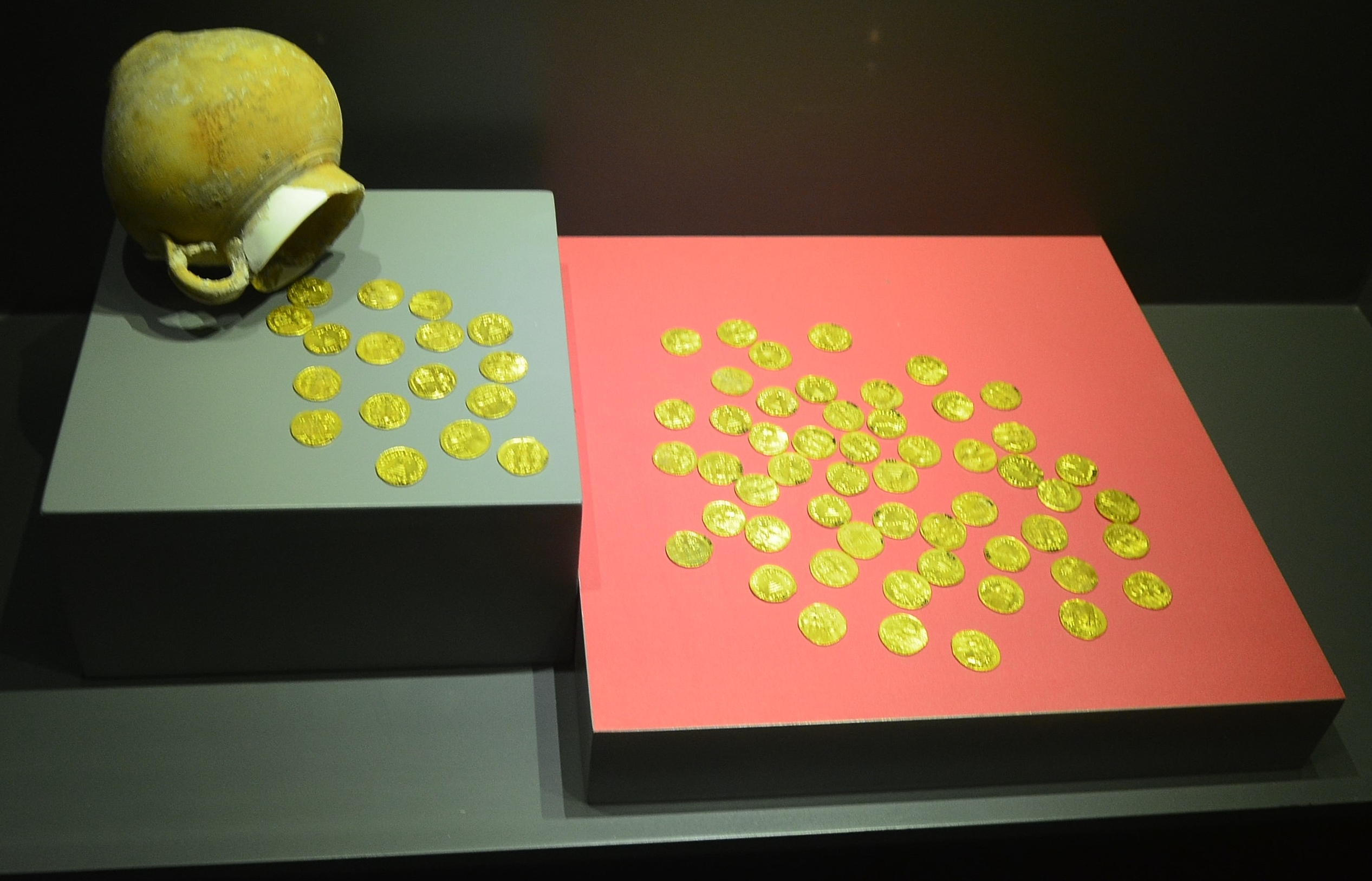
Ancient Roman coins

Coin collections from the era of Lydia, classical antiquity, Hellenistic period, periods of Roman, Byzantian, Seljuk and Ottoman Empire are on display in showcases. In addition, the section contains as part of the Kızıldere Treasure a rare treasure trove consisting of silver coins of 29 Roman emperors and nine empresses reigned between 40 AD and 270 AD. In the section, also the ancient minting technology is portrayed by dummies.

Recovery excavation Section

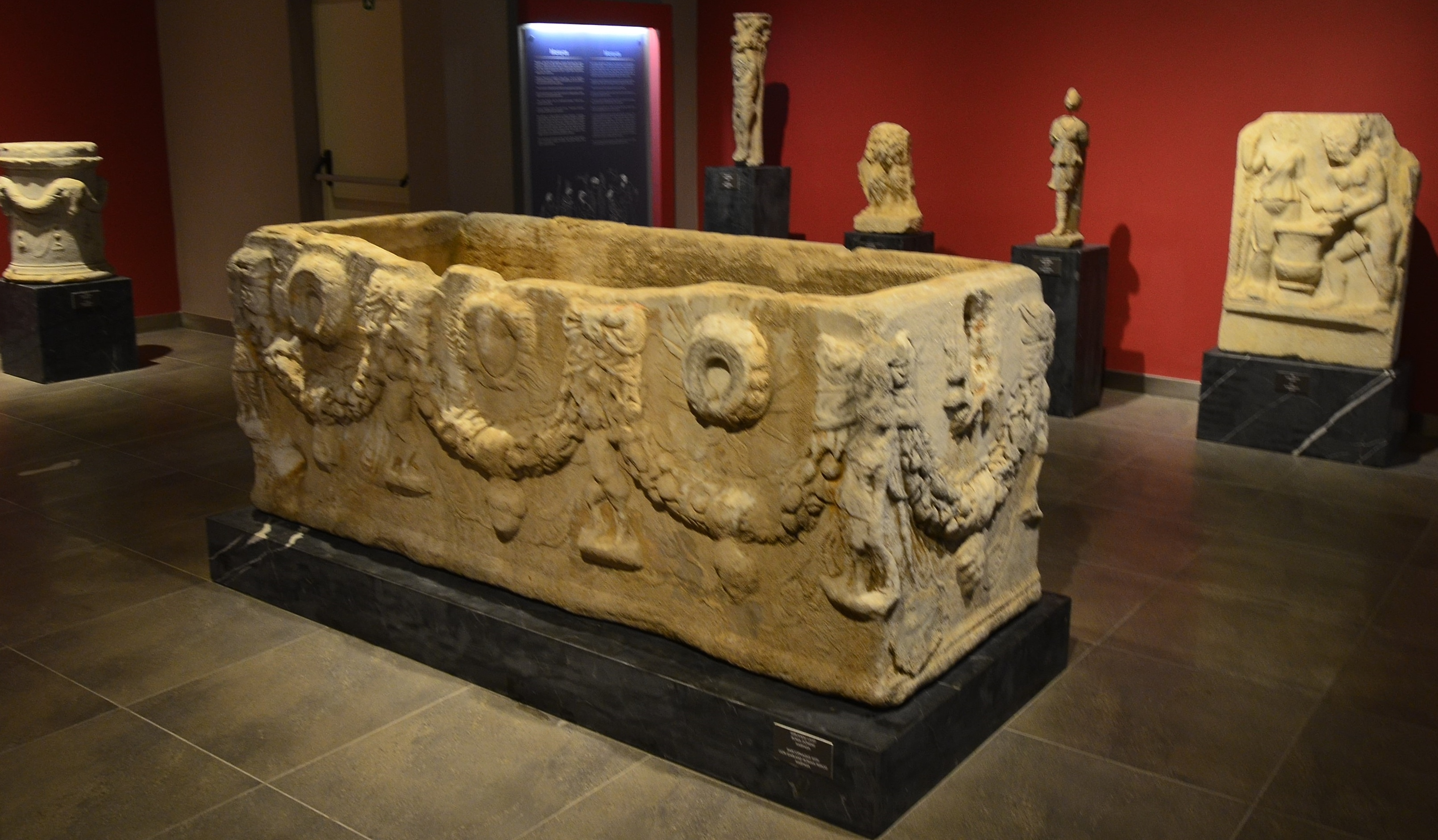
Ancient Roman sarcophag

Artifacts obtained during three recovery excavations at burial places, which were carried out by the museum, are on display in this section.

== Access ==
The museum is located in Müze Bulvarı 4, at Ilıcabaşı neighborhood of Efeler, Aydın district. It is closed on Mondays and on the first day of religious holidays until noon.
