= Tryphosa of Tralles =

Ancient Greek athlete

Tryphosa of Tralles (Ancient Greek: Τρυφῶσα) was an Ancient Greek athlete who competed in the stadion footrace. She twice won at the Pythian Games and once at the Isthmian Games.

Tryphosa was one of the daughters of Hermesianax of Tralles (Ancient Greek: Ἑρμησιάναξ), and sister of Hedea (Ancient Greek: Ἡδεα) and Dionysia (Ancient Greek: Διονυσία) who were also winners of agonistic competitions. Hermesianax erected a monument for his daughters dedicated to the Pythian Apollo at the sanctuary in Delphi.
