= Sadık Giz =

Turkish politician and sports executive (1911 – 1979)

Mustafa Sadık Giz (1911 – 1979) was a Turkish politician and former chairman of the Turkish sports club Galatasaray.

== Biography ==
Giz was born in Söke, Aydın, in 1911. He was a close relative of political leader and former Turkish prime minister Adnan Menderes. Giz was a cofounder of the Democratic Party in 1946. He was elected three times as member of national parliament from Democratic Party as deputy of İzmir. In 1957 he was elected as Galatasaray President until 1959. Although there was no national football league established in Turkey in 1950's, Galatasaray won an Istanbul League title, while Giz was the president. During his tenure he bought the Galatasaray Islet. He died on 31 January 1979.

Sporting positions
Preceded by Refik Selimoğlu	President of Galatasaray SK; 11 Jan 1957 – 2 Jan 1960	Succeeded by Refik Selimoğlu
