= List of Cryptocephalus species =

This is a partial list of species belonging to Cryptocephalus, a genus of case-bearing leaf beetles in the family Chrysomelidae.

- Cryptocephalus abdominalis Weise, 1886 (Algeria, Tunisia)
- Cryptocephalus abhorens Suffrian, 1866 (South America)
- Cryptocephalus acupunctatus Fairmaire, 1873 (Algeria)
- Cryptocephalus albicans Haldeman, 1849 (Southeast United States)
- Cryptocephalus albolineatus Suffrian, 1847 (Western Alps)
- Cryptocephalus alborzensis Rapilly, 1980 (Azerbaijan, Iran)
- Cryptocephalus alnicola A.Costa, 1884 (Sardinia)
- Cryptocephalus alpigradus Lopatin, 1982 (Nepal)
- Cryptocephalus altaicus Harold, 1872 (Palearctic)
- Cryptocephalus alternans Suffrian, 1852 (United States Pacific Coast)
- Cryptocephalus amasiensis Weise, 1894 (Turkey)
- Cryptocephalus amatus Haldeman, 1849 (North America, Mexico)
- Cryptocephalus amiculus Baly, 1873 (Japan)
- Cryptocephalus analis Olivier, 1808 (India, Nepal)
- Cryptocephalus andrewsi Riley & Gilbert, 2000 (Southwest United States)
- Cryptocephalus androgyne Marseul, 1875 (Europe)
- Cryptocephalus angorensis Pic, 1908 (Turkey)
- Cryptocephalus annulipes Baly, 1867
- Cryptocephalus anticus Suffrian, 1848 (Palearctic)
- Cryptocephalus apicalis Gebler, 1830 (Palearctic)
- Cryptocephalus appositus Lopatin, 1958
- Cryptocephalus aquitanus Sassi, 2001 (Europe)
- Cryptocephalus araxicola Iablokoff-Khnzorian, 1968 (Armenia)
- Cryptocephalus araxidis Weise, 1898
- Cryptocephalus areolatus Suffrian, 1852
- Cryptocephalus arizonensis Schaeffer, 1904 (Southwest United States, Mexico)
- Cryptocephalus arnoldii Medvedev, 1956 (Kazakhstan, Uzbekistan, Tajikistan)
- Cryptocephalus astracanicus Suffrian, 1847 (Palearctic)
- Cryptocephalus astralosus White, 1968
- Cryptocephalus asturiensis Heyden, 1870 (Spain)
- Cryptocephalus atrifrons Abeille de Perrin, 1901 (Europe)
- Cryptocephalus atriplicis Lopatin, 1967 (Caucasus, Central Asia)
- Cryptocephalus atrofasciatus Jacoby, 1880 (Southwest United States, Mexico)
- Cryptocephalus augustalisi Pic, 1913
- Cryptocephalus aulicus Haldeman, 1849 (Southeast United States)
- Cryptocephalus aureolus Suffrian, 1847 (Palearctic)
- Cryptocephalus auripennis Chûjô, 1934 (China)
- Cryptocephalus austerus Suffrian, 1852 (Mexico)
- Cryptocephalus australobispinus Riley & Gilbert, 2000 (United States)
- Cryptocephalus ayvazi Gök & Sassi, 2002
- Cryptocephalus azurescens Escalera, 1914 (Morocco)
- Cryptocephalus babai Chûjô, 1959
- Cryptocephalus baborensis Pic, 1914 (Algeria)
- Cryptocephalus badius Suffrian, 1852 (Eastern North America)
- Cryptocephalus baenai López & Bastazo, 2012 (Spain, Portugal)
- Cryptocephalus baeticus Suffrian, 1847 (Iberian Peninsula, Morocco, Algeria)
- Cryptocephalus bahadur Lopatin, 1984 (India, Nepal)
- Cryptocephalus bahilloi Colón, 2003
- Cryptocephalus bailundensis Weise
- Cryptocephalus balassogloi Jacobson, 1895 (Kazakhstan, Uzbekistan, Tajikistan)
- Cryptocephalus balteatus Suffrian, 1852
- Cryptocephalus bameuli Duhaldeborde, 1999 (Palearctic)
- Cryptocephalus baowenzhengi Duan & Zhou, 2021 (China)
- Cryptocephalus barii Burlini, 1948 (Italian Alps)
- Cryptocephalus baroniurbanii Lopatin, 1982 (India, Nepal, Bhutan)
- Cryptocephalus basalis Suffrian, 1852 (Southern United States, Mexico)
- Cryptocephalus beckeri F. Morawitz, 1860 (Palearctic)
- Cryptocephalus bhutanicus Lopatin, 1975 (Nepal, Bhutan)
- Cryptocephalus bhutanus Medvedev & Sprecher, 1997 (Bhutan)
- Cryptocephalus bicolor Eschscholtz, 1818 (Palearctic)
- Cryptocephalus bicoloripennis Chûjô, 1934 (China)
- Cryptocephalus bidentatus Medvedev, 1956 (Kazakhstan, Kyrgyzstan, Tajikistan)
- Cryptocephalus bidentulus Suffrian, 1854 (Palearctic)
- Cryptocephalus bidorsalis Marseul, 1875 (Lebanon)
- Cryptocephalus biguttatus (Scopoli, 1763) (Europe)
- Cryptocephalus biguttulatus Gebler, 1841 (Palearctic)
- Cryptocephalus biguttulus Suffrian, 1848 (Crimea)
- Cryptocephalus biledjekensis Pic, 1909 (Bulgaria, Turkey)
- Cryptocephalus bilineatus (Linnaeus, 1767) (Palaearctic)
- Cryptocephalus bimaculatus Fabricius, 1781 (France, Italy)
- Cryptocephalus binominis Newman, 1841 (Eastern United States)
- Cryptocephalus binotatus White, 1968 (Southwest United States)
- Cryptocephalus biondii Sassi & Regalin, 1998 (Mediterranean)
- Cryptocephalus biordopunctatus Duan, Wang & Zhou, 2021 (China)
- Cryptocephalus bipunctatus (Linnaeus, 1758) (Palaearctic)
- Cryptocephalus bipunctatus (Linnaeus, 1758) (Palearctic)
- Cryptocephalus bispinus Suffrian, 1858 (Southern United States)
- Cryptocephalus bissexsignatus Suffrian, 1854 (India, Nepal, Burma, Laos)
- Cryptocephalus bistripustulatus Suffrian, 1857 (South Africa)
- Cryptocephalus bitaeniatus Solsky, 1876 (Uzbekistan, Tajikistan, Turkmenistan)
- Cryptocephalus bivius Newman, 1840 (Southeastern United States)
- Cryptocephalus bivulneratus Faldermann, 1835 (Palearctic)
- Cryptocephalus blanduloides Normand, 1947 (Algeria, Tunisia, Morocco)
- Cryptocephalus bodungeni Jacobson, 1905 (Palearctic)
- Cryptocephalus bohemius Drapiez, 1819 (Palaearctic)
- Cryptocephalus boreoindicus Lopatin, 1995 (Nepal)
- Cryptocephalus borneoensis Medvedev & Romantsov, 2017
- Cryptocephalus borochorensis Pic, 1907 (Palearctic)
- Cryptocephalus borowieci Warchałowski, 1999
- Cryptocephalus brahminus Jacoby, 1908 (Nepal, India)
- Cryptocephalus brancuccii Lopatin 1984 (Nepal, India)
- Cryptocephalus brevebilineatus Pic, 1922 (China)
- Cryptocephalus brevisignaticollis Pic, 1914 (Lebanon, Syria, Jordan)
- Cryptocephalus brunneopunctatus Pic, 1922 (China)
- Cryptocephalus brunneovittatus Schaeffer, 1904 (Texas, Mexico)
- Cryptocephalus brunneus Suffrian, 1863
- Cryptocephalus bryanti Gressitt (China)
- Cryptocephalus caerulescens Sahlberg, 1838
- Cryptocephalus calidus Suffrian, 1852 (Eastern North America, Southern Africa)
- Cryptocephalus cantabricus Franz, 1958 (Spain)
- Cryptocephalus carinthiacus Suffrian, 1848 (Europe)
- Cryptocephalus carpathicus Frivaldszky, 1883 (Europe)
- Cryptocephalus castaneus Leconte, 1880 (North America)
- Cryptocephalus castilianus Weise, 1894 (Spain)
- Cryptocephalus celtibericus Suffrian, 1848 (Iberian Peninsula)
- Cryptocephalus cerinus White, 1937 (Western United States)
- Cryptocephalus chafarinensis Petitpierre, 2007
- Cryptocephalus chikatunovi Lopatin, 2008 (UAE)
- Cryptocephalus chinensis Jacoby, 1888
- Cryptocephalus chrysopus Gmelin, 1790 (Europe)
- Cryptocephalus cicatricosus Lucas, 1845 (Morocco, Algeria, Spain)
- Cryptocephalus cilicius Duhaldeborde, 2018 (Turkey)
- Cryptocephalus coerulans Marseul, 1875 (Palearctic)
- Cryptocephalus cognatus A.Costa, 1886 (Sardinia)
- Cryptocephalus concolor Suffrian, 1847
- Cryptocephalus confluentus Say, 1824 (Western North America)
- Cryptocephalus confusus Suffrian, 1854 (Palearctic)
- Cryptocephalus connexus Olivier, 1807 (Palearctic)
- Cryptocephalus constricticollis Jacoby, 1889
- Cryptocephalus contextus White, 1968
- Cryptocephalus convergens Sassi, 2001 (Europe)
- Cryptocephalus cordiger (Linnaeus, 1758) (Palearctic)
- Cryptocephalus coronatus Suffrian, 1847 (Palearctic)
- Cryptocephalus coryli (Linnaeus, 1758) (Palearctic)
- Cryptocephalus corynetes Warchałowski, 1999
- Cryptocephalus corynthius Pic, 1914
- Cryptocephalus cowaniae Schaeffer, 1934
- Cryptocephalus crassus Olivier, 1791 (Southern Europe, North Africa)
- Cryptocephalus crenatus Wollaston, 1854 (Madeira)
- Cryptocephalus creticus Suffrian, 1847 (Crete)
- Cryptocephalus cribratus Suffrian, 1847 (Turkey, Syria, Caucasus, Iran)
- Cryptocephalus cribripennis Leconte, 1880 (Southern United States, Mexico)
- Cryptocephalus cristula Dufour, 1843 (Europe)
- Cryptocephalus cruciger Hellén, 1922
- Cryptocephalus crucipennis Suffrian, 1854
- Cryptocephalus crux Thunberg, 1827
- Cryptocephalus cuneatus Fall, 1932 (Southern United States)
- Cryptocephalus cupressi Schaeffer, 1933 (Southern United States)
- Cryptocephalus curda Jacobson, 1897
- Cryptocephalus curtissimus Pic, 1907 (Palearctic)
- Cryptocephalus curvilinea Olivier, 1808 (Southern Europe, North Africa)
- Cryptocephalus cyanipes Suffrian, 1847 (Europe)
- Cryptocephalus cynarae Suffrian, 1847 (Europe)
- Cryptocephalus czwalinae Weise, 1882 (Italy)
- Cryptocephalus daccordii Biondi, 1995 (Italy)
- Cryptocephalus dahdah Marseul, 1869 (Lebanon, Israel, Jordan)
- Cryptocephalus danieli Clavareau, 1913 (Spain)
- Cryptocephalus darjilingensis Jacoby, 1908 (India, Nepal)
- Cryptocephalus decemmaculatus (Linnaeus, 1758) (Europe)
- Cryptocephalus decemnotatus Thunberg, 1787
- Cryptocephalus defectus Leconte, 1880 (Texas)
- Cryptocephalus deficiens Suffrian, 1854 (India, Nepal, Bhuatan)
- Cryptocephalus diadochus Lopatin, 1963 (Tajikistan)
- Cryptocephalus dilectus Weise, 1894 (Kazakhstan, Kyrgyzstan, Tajikistan)
- Cryptocephalus dilutellus Jacobson, 1901 (Kazakhstan, Kyrgyzstan, Tajikistan)
- Cryptocephalus dimidiatipennis Jacoby, 1895 (India, Nepal)
- Cryptocephalus dinae Lopatin & Chikatunov, 2000 (Israel)
- Cryptocephalus discicollis Fairmaire, 1867 (North Africa)
- Cryptocephalus discoidalis Jacoby, 1890
- Cryptocephalus disruptus White, 1968
- Cryptocephalus distinctenotatus Pic, 1901 (Lebanon)
- Cryptocephalus distinguendus Schneider, 1792 (Palearctic)
- Cryptocephalus dogueti Bourdonne, 1994 (Morocco, Algeria)
- Cryptocephalus dorsatus White, 1968
- Cryptocephalus downiei E. Riley & Gilbert, 2000 (South Texas)
- Cryptocephalus dregii Suffrian, 1857 (Africa)
- Cryptocephalus drewi Gilbert, 2014 (Baja California, Mexico)
- Cryptocephalus dumonti Peyerimhoff, 1924 (Algeria, Tunisia, Egypt, Israel)
- Cryptocephalus duplicatus Suffrian, 1845 (Bulgaria, Greece, Turkey)
- Cryptocephalus duryi Schaeffer, 1906 (South Texas, Mexico)
- Cryptocephalus eberti Kimoto, 2004 (Nepal)
- Cryptocephalus egregius Schaeffer, 1933
- Cryptocephalus elatus Fabricius, 1801 (Morocco)
- Cryptocephalus elegantulus Gravenhorst, 1807 (Palearctic)
- Cryptocephalus elongatus Germar, 1824 (Palearctic)
- Cryptocephalus emiliae Kocher, 1955 (Morocco)
- Cryptocephalus ensifer Hope, 1831 (India, Nepal)
- Cryptocephalus eous Lopatin, 1952 (Palearctic)
- Cryptocephalus equiseti A.Costa, 1886 (Sardinia)
- Cryptocephalus erberi Lopatin, 1991 (Nepal)
- Cryptocephalus ergenensis F. Morawitz, 1863 (Palearctic)
- Cryptocephalus ergenesis Morawitz, 1863 (Palearctic)
- Cryptocephalus eridani Sassi, 2001 (Italy)
- Cryptocephalus espanoli Burlini, 1965 (Iberian Peninsula)
- Cryptocephalus etruscus Suffrian, 1847 (Europe)
- Cryptocephalus euchirus Kraatz, 1879 (Armenia, Iran)
- Cryptocephalus excisus Seidlitz, 1872 (Spain)
- Cryptocephalus exiguus Schneider, 1792 (Palearctic)
- Cryptocephalus exsulans Suffrian, 1854 (India, Nepal, Bhutan, China)
- Cryptocephalus falli Schöller, 2002 (Southeast United States)
- Cryptocephalus falzonii Burlini, 1956 (Italy)
- Cryptocephalus fasciatointerruptus Berti & Rapilly, 1979 (Iran)
- Cryptocephalus fasciatus Say, 1824
- Cryptocephalus fausti Weise, 1882 (Caucasus, Turkey)
- Cryptocephalus fedtschenkoi Jacobson, 1901 (Kazakhstan, Tajikistan, Kyrgyzstan)
- Cryptocephalus festivus Jacoby, 1890
- Cryptocephalus flavago Suffrian 1857 (South Africa)
- Cryptocephalus flavicollis Fabricius, 1781 (Palearctic)
- Cryptocephalus flavipes Fabricius, 1781 (Palearctic)
- Cryptocephalus flavoscutellaris Medvedev, 1973 (Palearctic)
- Cryptocephalus flexuosus Krynicki, 1834 (Palearctic)
- Cryptocephalus floralis Krynicki, 1834 (Palearctic)
- Cryptocephalus floribundus Suffrian, 1866 (Pyrenees)
- Cryptocephalus formosanus Chujo, 1934
- Cryptocephalus fraterculus Chapuis, 1875 (Australia)
- Cryptocephalus freidbergi Lopatin & Chikatunov, 1997 (Israel)
- Cryptocephalus frenatus Laicharting, 1781 (Europe)
- Cryptocephalus frontalis Marsham, 1802 (Europe)
- Cryptocephalus fulgurans Fairmaire, 1873 (Morocco, Algeria)
- Cryptocephalus fulguratus Leconte, 1880 (North, Central, and South America)
- Cryptocephalus fulmenifer Reitter, 1889 (South Caucasus)
- Cryptocephalus fulvus (Goeze, 1777)
- Cryptocephalus gamma Herrich-Schäffer, 1829 (Europe)
- Cryptocephalus geiseri Medvedev & Romantsov, 2017
- Cryptocephalus geisthardti Schöller, 2021
- Cryptocephalus gestroi Jacoby, 1892 (Nepal, Burma, Thailand, Laos, Vietnam, China)
- Cryptocephalus gibbicollis Haldeman, 1849 (Eastern North America)
- Cryptocephalus glabrelegantulus Duan & Zhou, 2021 (China)
- Cryptocephalus globicollis Suffrian, 1847 (Europe)
- Cryptocephalus globulus Lopatin, 1953 (Kazakhstan, Kyrgyzstan, Tajikistan, Uzbekistan)
- Cryptocephalus gloriosus Mulsant & Wachanru, 1853 (Turkey)
- Cryptocephalus gorbunovi Medvedev, 1999 (Nepal)
- Cryptocephalus gounellei Pic, 1922 (Canary Islands)
- Cryptocephalus grammicus Suffrian, 1852
- Cryptocephalus gridellii Burlini, 1950 (Europe)
- Cryptocephalus grohmanni Suffrian, 1848
- Cryptocephalus guadeloupensis Fleutiaux & Sallé, 1889
- Cryptocephalus gussakovskii Lopatin, 1952 (Palearctic)
- Cryptocephalus guttifer Suffrian, 1854 (Nepal, India)
- Cryptocephalus guttulatellus Schaeffer, 1920 (Texas, Mexico)
- Cryptocephalus guttulatus Olivier, 1808 (Eastern North America)
- Cryptocephalus guyanensis Jacoby, 1907
- Cryptocephalus hainanicus Gressitt, 1942 (China)
- Cryptocephalus haitiensis
- Cryptocephalus halleri Costessèque, 2008
- Cryptocephalus halophilus Gebler, 1830 (Kazakhstan)
- Cryptocephalus hamatus Suffrian, 1854 (Palearctic)
- Cryptocephalus hamifasciatus Chujo, 1934
- Cryptocephalus hammadae Lopatin, 1961 (Tajikistan)
- Cryptocephalus haroldi Kraatz, 1879 (Palearctic)
- Cryptocephalus hauseri Weise, 1887 (Kazakhstan)
- Cryptocephalus heinigi Warchałowski, 1999 (Syria)
- Cryptocephalus heraldicus Suffrian, 1854 (China)
- Cryptocephalus heraldicus Suffrian, 1854 (Nepal, China)
- Cryptocephalus heydeni Weise, 1886 (Palearctic)
- Cryptocephalus hiro Chujo, 1954 (China, Mexico)
- Cryptocephalus hirticollis Suffrian, 1847
- Cryptocephalus hirtipennis Fladermann, 1935 (Palearctic)
- Cryptocephalus hohuanshanus Kimoto, 1996
- Cryptocephalus honshuensis Takizawa, 2015
- Cryptocephalus hopei Medvedev & Sprecher, 1997 (Nepal, India)
- Cryptocephalus hyacinthinus Suffrian, 1860 (Palearctic)
- Cryptocephalus hypochaeridis (Linnaeus, 1758) (Palearctic)
- Cryptocephalus hypochoeridis (Linnaeus, 1758) (Palearctic)
- Cryptocephalus ilicis G. A. Olivier, 1808 (Mediterranean)
- Cryptocephalus illyricus Franz, 1949 (Slovenia, Croatia, Bulgaria)
- Cryptocephalus imperialis Laicharting, 1781 (Palearctic)
- Cryptocephalus implacidus White, 1968 (Southern United States)
- Cryptocephalus impressipygus Ogloblin, 1956
- Cryptocephalus incertus Olivier, 1808 (North America)
- Cryptocephalus incognitus Gilbert, 2014
- Cryptocephalus indecoratus Stal, 1857
- Cryptocephalus indicus Suffrian, 1854 (India, Nepal)
- Cryptocephalus infirmior Kraatz, 1876 (Europe)
- Cryptocephalus informis Suffrian, 1847 (Europe)
- Cryptocephalus infraniger Pic, 1915 (Turkey)
- Cryptocephalus ingamma Pic, 1908 (Spain)
- Cryptocephalus insertus Haldeman, 1849 (Eastern North America)
- Cryptocephalus instabilis (Japan)
- Cryptocephalus invisus Lopatin, 1963
- Cryptocephalus irenae Lopatin, 1958 (Tajikistan)
- Cryptocephalus irroratus Suffrian, 1852 (North, Central, and South America)
- Cryptocephalus iskanderi Lopatin, 1961 (Tajikistan)
- Cryptocephalus jani Medvedev, 2011 (China)
- Cryptocephalus janthinus Germar, 1824 (Palearctic)
- Cryptocephalus jaxarticus Lopatin, 1986 (Kazakhstan)
- Cryptocephalus jocularius Normand, 1947 (Tunisia)
- Cryptocephalus kabaki Lopatin, 2002 (Northern China)
- Cryptocephalus kanoi Chujo, 1954
- Cryptocephalus karakalensis Medvedev, 1955 (Turkmenistan, Uzbekistan, Tajikistan)
- Cryptocephalus karatavicus Lopatin, 1971 (Kazakhstan)
- Cryptocephalus karsantianus Pic, 1914
- Cryptocephalus katranus Lopatin, 1997 (Jordan)
- Cryptocephalus kerzhneri Lopatin, 1968 (Kazakhstan)
- Cryptocephalus kiritschenkiellus Lopatin, 1961 (Uzbekistan)
- Cryptocephalus kiyoyamai Kimoto, 1974 (China, Taiwan)
- Cryptocephalus klarae Lopatin, 1990 (Kazakhstan)
- Cryptocephalus klimenkoi Medvedev & Romantsov, 2017
- Cryptocephalus kokanda Jacobson, 1924
- Cryptocephalus koltzei Weise, 1887
- Cryptocephalus korotjaevi Medvedev, 1980 (Palearctic)
- Cryptocephalus krugi Weise, 1885
- Cryptocephalus krutovskyi Jacobson, 1900 (Palearctic)
- Cryptocephalus kulibini Gebler, 1832 (Palearctic)
- Cryptocephalus kurentzovi Medvedev, 1966 (Palearctic)
- Cryptocephalus labiatus (Linnaeus, 1761) (Europe)
- Cryptocephalus lacosus Pic, 1922 (China)
- Cryptocephalus laetus Fabricius, 1792 (Palearctic)
- Cryptocephalus laevicollis Gebler, 1830 (Palearctic)
- Cryptocephalus lanpingensis Tan, 1992 (China)
- Cryptocephalus lateralis Suffrian, 1863 (Palearctic)
- Cryptocephalus lateritius Newman, 1841 (Southeast United States)
- Cryptocephalus laticornis Suffrian, 1863
- Cryptocephalus latimargo Medvedev, 1971 (Palearctic)
- Cryptocephalus lederi Weise, 1889 (Azerbaijan; Afghanistan)
- Cryptocephalus lefevrei Jacoby, 1895 (Nepal, India)
- Cryptocephalus lemniscatus Suffrian, 1854 (Palearctic)
- Cryptocephalus lentiginosus Tan, 1992 (China)
- Cryptocephalus leonhardi Breit, 1918 (Italy, Slovenia, Croatia)
- Cryptocephalus leucomelas Suffrian, 1852 (North America)
- Cryptocephalus limbatipennis Jacoby, 1885 (Palearctic)
- Cryptocephalus limbellus Suffrian, 1847
- Cryptocephalus limbifer Seidlitz, 1867 (Spain)
- Cryptocephalus limoniastri Pic, 1894 (Algeria)
- Cryptocephalus lineellus Suffrian, 1849 (Mediterranean)
- Cryptocephalus literatifer Pic, 1891 (Europe)
- Cryptocephalus lividimanus Suffrian, 1851 (Iberian Peninsula)
- Cryptocephalus loebli Sassi, 1997 (Turkey)
- Cryptocephalus lofgrenae Gressitt & Kimoto, 1961 (China)
- Cryptocephalus longchiensis Duan & Zhou, 2021 (China)
- Cryptocephalus lopatianus Medvedev & Sprecher, 1997 (India, Nepal)
- Cryptocephalus loreyi Solier, 1837 (Italy, France)
- Cryptocephalus lostiai Burlini, 1951 (Spain)
- Cryptocephalus lostianus Burlini, 1956
- Cryptocephalus lunatus White, 1968
- Cryptocephalus lunulatus Schöller, 2002
- Cryptocephalus luridicollis Suffrian, 1868 (France, Spain, Morocco)
- Cryptocephalus luridipennis Suffrian, 1854 (Palearctic)
- Cryptocephalus lusitanicus Suffrian, 1847 (Iberian Peninsula)
- Cryptocephalus luteolus Newman, 1840 (North America)
- Cryptocephalus luteosignatus Pic, 1922 (China, Taiwan)
- Cryptocephalus maccus White, 1968 (Southwest United States, Mexico)
- Cryptocephalus macellus Suffrian, 1860 (Europe, North Africa)
- Cryptocephalus macrodactylus Gebler, 1830 (Palearctic)
- Cryptocephalus majoricensis de la Fuente, 1918 (Spain)
- Cryptocephalus makii Chujo, 1934
- Cryptocephalus mannerheimi Gebler, 1825 (Palearctic)
- Cryptocephalus marginatus Fabricius, 1781 (Europe)
- Cryptocephalus marginellus Olivier, 1791 (Europe)
- Cryptocephalus marginicollis Suffrian 1851
- Cryptocephalus mariae Mulsant & Rey, 1852 (Iberian Peninsula, France, Algeria)
- Cryptocephalus mayeti Marseul, 1878 (France)
- Cryptocephalus maytreiae Lopatin, 1979 (India, Nepal)
- Cryptocephalus medvedevi Lopatin, 1953 (Turkmenistan, Tajikistan, Afghanistan)
- Cryptocephalus melanoxanthus Solsky, 1876 (Kazakhstan, Kyrgyzstan, Tajikistan, Uzbekistan)
- Cryptocephalus merus Fall, 1932 (Southwest United States, Mexico)
- Cryptocephalus messutati Kippenberg, 2011 (Turkey)
- Cryptocephalus micheli Medvedev & Sprecher, 1997 (Nepal)
- Cryptocephalus mitchyi Chujo, 1954
- Cryptocephalus mniczechi Tappes, 1869 (Palearctic)
- Cryptocephalus modestus Suffrian, 1848 (Palearctic)
- Cryptocephalus moehringi Weise, 1884 (Greece, Turkey)
- Cryptocephalus monilis Weise, 1890 (Kazakhstan, Mongolia, China)
- Cryptocephalus monticola Breit, 1918
- Cryptocephalus moraei (Linnaeus, 1758) (Europe, Turkey)
- Cryptocephalus moroderi Pic, 1914 (France, Spain)
- Cryptocephalus moutoni Pic, 1922 (China)
- Cryptocephalus moya Chujo, 1954
- Cryptocephalus mucoreus Leconte, 1859 (United States)
- Cryptocephalus muellerianus Burlini, 1955 (Spain)
- Cryptocephalus multiplex Suffrian, 1860 (Nepal, China, Korea, E. Siberia)
- Cryptocephalus multisignatus Schaeffer, 1933 (North America)
- Cryptocephalus mutabilis Melsheimer, 1847 (Eastern North America)
- Cryptocephalus mystacatus Suffrian, 1848 (Spain)
- Cryptocephalus nanus Fabricius, 1801 (Southeast United States)
- Cryptocephalus nepalensis Bryant, 1952 (Nepal, Bhutan)
- Cryptocephalus nigellus Lopatin & Chikatunov, 2000 (Israel)
- Cryptocephalus nigriceps Allard, 1891 (China)
- Cryptocephalus nigrocinctus Suffrian, 1852 (Florida, Caribbean)
- Cryptocephalus nigrofasciatus Jacoby, 1885 (Palearctic)
- Cryptocephalus nigrofulvus Medvedev & Romantsov, 2017
- Cryptocephalus nigrolimbatus Jacoby, 1890 (China)
- Cryptocephalus nigronotaticollis Chujo, 1934
- Cryptocephalus nigronotatus Bryant, 1954 (Afghanistan, India, Nepal)
- Cryptocephalus nigroplagiatus Fairmaire, 1850
- Cryptocephalus nilghiriensis Jacoby, 1903 (India, Nepal)
- Cryptocephalus nitidicollis Wollaston, 1864 (Canary Islands)
- Cryptocephalus nitidicornis Medvedev & Romantsov, 2017
- Cryptocephalus nitidissimus Chujo, 1934 (China, Taiwan)
- Cryptocephalus nitidulus Fabricius, 1787 (Europe)
- Cryptocephalus nitidus (Linnaeus, 1758) (Palearctic)
- Cryptocephalus nitobei Chujo, 1934
- Cryptocephalus nobilis Kraatz, 1879 (Palearctic)
- Cryptocephalus notatus Fabricius, 1787 (North America)
- Cryptocephalus notogrammus Suffrian, 1854 (Nepal, India)
- Cryptocephalus nubigena Franz, 1982 (Canary Islands)
- Cryptocephalus numidicus Bourdonne, 1994 (Morocco, Algeria, Tunisia)
- Cryptocephalus obliteratifer Pic, 1900
- Cryptocephalus obsoletus Germar, 1824 (Southeastern United States)
- Cryptocephalus ocellatus Drapiez, 1819 (Palearctic)
- Cryptocephalus ochraceus Fall, 1932
- Cryptocephalus ochroleucus Fairmaire, 1859 (Europe)
- Cryptocephalus ochroloma Gebler, 1830 (Palearctic)
- Cryptocephalus octacosmus Bedel, 1891 (Europe)
- Cryptocephalus octodecimpunctatus Suffrian, 1852 (Mexico)
- Cryptocephalus octoguttatus (Linnaeus, 1767) (Iberian Peninsula, France)
- Cryptocephalus octomaclatus Rossi, 1790 (Europe, Azerbaijan)
- Cryptocephalus octomaculatus Rossi, 1790 (Europe)
- Cryptocephalus octopunctatus (Scopoli, 1763) (Europe)
- Cryptocephalus octopustulatus Thunberg, 1787 (South Africa)
- Cryptocephalus ogloblini Lopatin, 1953 (Kazakhstan, Uzbekistan, Kyrgyzstan)
- Cryptocephalus ohnoi Kimoto, 1983 (Japan, China)
- Cryptocephalus omanicus Medvedev, 1996 (Oman, UAE)
- Cryptocephalus oneili Jacoby,1904 (South Africa)
- Cryptocephalus oppositus Jacoby, 1908 (India, Nepal)
- Cryptocephalus optimus Schöller, 2002 (Southern United States)
- Cryptocephalus oranensis Weise, 1882 (Algeria)
- Cryptocephalus orotschena Jacobson, 1926
- Cryptocephalus ovatus Fleutiaux & Sallé, 1889
- Cryptocephalus ovulum Suffrian, 1854 (Nepal, India)
- Cryptocephalus oxianus Lopatin, 1975 (Tajikistan)
- Cryptocephalus oxysternus Jacobson, 1895 (Palearctic)
- Cryptocephalus paganensis Pic, 1914 (Italy)
- Cryptocephalus pallidicinctus Fall, 1932 (Southwest United States)
- Cryptocephalus pallidocinctus Fairmaire, 1867 (Algeria, Morocco)
- Cryptocephalus pallifrons Gyllenhal, 1813 (Palaearctic)
- Cryptocephalus paphlagonius Sassi & Kismali, 2000 (Turkey)
- Cryptocephalus paradisiacus Weise, 1900 (Turkey)
- Cryptocephalus parvulus Müller, 1776 (Palaearctic)
- Cryptocephalus pasticus Suffrian, 1863
- Cryptocephalus pavlovskii Lopatin, 1956 (Kazakhstan, Uzbekistan)
- Cryptocephalus peliopterus Solsky, 1871 (Palearctic)
- Cryptocephalus pelleti Marseul, 1875 (Palearctic)
- Cryptocephalus perelegans Baly, 1873 (Iberian Peninsula, France, Algeria)
- Cryptocephalus perrisi Tappes, 1869 (Morocco, Algeria)
- Cryptocephalus personatus Weise, 1892 (Kyrgyzstan)
- Cryptocephalus pexicollis Suffrian, 1847 (Iberian Peninsula, France, Algeria)
- Cryptocephalus peyroni Marseul, 1875 (Middle East)
- Cryptocephalus phaleratus Tappes, 1871 (Caucasus)
- Cryptocephalus piceoverticalis Pic, 1939 (Tunisia)
- Cryptocephalus picturatus Germar, 1824
- Cryptocephalus pini (Linnaeus, 1758) (Palearctic)
- Cryptocephalus pinicolus Schaeffer, 1920 (Southwest United States)
- Cryptocephalus planifrons Weise, 1882 (Europe)
- Cryptocephalus podager Seidlitz, 1867 (Spain)
- Cryptocephalus pokharensis Medvedev & Sprecher 1999 (Nepal)
- Cryptocephalus politus Suffrian, 1853 (Sicily, Algeria)
- Cryptocephalus polymorphus Solsky, 1881
- Cryptocephalus polymorphus Solsky, 1882 (Palearctic)
- Cryptocephalus pominorum Burlini, 1956 (Iberian Peninsula, France)
- Cryptocephalus populi Suffrian, 1848 (Palearctic)
- Cryptocephalus poultoni Jacoby, 1908 (Nepal)
- Cryptocephalus prasolovi Lopatin, 1992 (Kazakhstan)
- Cryptocephalus praticola Weise, 1889 (Palearctic)
- Cryptocephalus primarius Harold, 1872 (Europe)
- Cryptocephalus prusias Suffrian, 1853 (Bulgaria, Turkey, Syria, Jordan)
- Cryptocephalus prusisas Suffrian, 1853 (Balkan Peninsula, South Caucasus, Turkey)
- Cryptocephalus pseudocautus Medvedev, 1973 (Asian Russia)
- Cryptocephalus pseudoexsulans Lopatin, 1982 (Bhutan)
- Cryptocephalus pseudolateralis Medvedev, 1979 (Kazakhstan)
- Cryptocephalus pseudolusitanicus Arnold, 1938 (Iberian Peninsula)
- Cryptocephalus pseudomaccus White, 1968 (Southwest United States, Mexico)
- Cryptocephalus pseudopopuli Schöller, 2011
- Cryptocephalus pseudoreitteri Tomov, 1976 (Turkey)
- Cryptocephalus pseudosindonicus Burlini, 1960 (Morocco)
- Cryptocephalus pubicollis Linell, 1898 (United States)
- Cryptocephalus pubiventris Schaeffer, 1920 (Southwest United States, Mexico)
- Cryptocephalus pulchellus Suffrian, 1848 (France, Italy, Spain)
- Cryptocephalus pullus Marseul, 1869 (Lebanon)
- Cryptocephalus pumilus Haldeman, 1849 (Southeast United States)
- Cryptocephalus punctatissimus Suffrian, 1857 (Egypt)
- Cryptocephalus puncticollis Wollaston, 1864 (Canary Islands)
- Cryptocephalus punctiger Paykull, 1799 (Europe)
- Cryptocephalus punctipes Say, 1824
- Cryptocephalus pusillus Fabricius, 1777 (Europe)
- Cryptocephalus pustulatus Fabricius, 1798
- Cryptocephalus pustulipes Menetries, 1836 (Palearctic)
- Cryptocephalus putjatae Jacobson, 1895 (Palearctic)
- Cryptocephalus pygmaeus Fabricius, 1792 (Palearctic)
- Cryptocephalus quadriguttatus Richter, 1820 (Palearctic)
- Cryptocephalus quadripunctatus Olivier, 1808
- Cryptocephalus quadripustulatus Gyllenhal, 1813 (Palearctic)
- Cryptocephalus quadrivittatus Jacoby,1880 (Mexico)
- Cryptocephalus quadruplex Newman, 1841 (North America)
- Cryptocephalus quatuordecimmaculatus Schneider, 1792 (Palearctic)
- Cryptocephalus querceti Suffrian, 1848 (Europe)
- Cryptocephalus quercus Schaeffer, 1906 (Southwest United States, Mexico)
- Cryptocephalus quinquepunctatus (Scopoli, 1763) (Europe)
- Cryptocephalus rabatensis Pic, 1953 (Morocco)
- Cryptocephalus ragusanus Roubal, 1912
- Cryptocephalus rajah Jacoby, 1908 (India, China)
- Cryptocephalus ramburii Suffrian, 1847 (Iberian Peninsula, France)
- Cryptocephalus regalis Gebler, 1830
- Cryptocephalus reichei Marseul, 1875 (Algeria)
- Cryptocephalus reitteri Weise, 1882 (Croatia, Slovenia, Bosnia, Serbia, Hungary)
- Cryptocephalus renatae Sassi, 2001 (Italy, Macedonia)
- Cryptocephalus rhombeus Suffrian, 1852 (Mexico)
- Cryptocephalus richteri Medvedev, 1957 (Armenia)
- Cryptocephalus romantsovi Medvedev, 2011
- Cryptocephalus rubi Menetries, 1832 (Caucasus, Iran)
- Cryptocephalus rubi Menetries, 1832 (South Caucasus)
- Cryptocephalus rubricus
- Cryptocephalus rufilabris Suffrian, 1853 (Palearctic)
- Cryptocephalus rufipes (Goeze, 1777) (Europe, North Africa)
- Cryptocephalus rufofasciatus Solsky, 1882 (Palearctic)
- Cryptocephalus rugicollis Olivier, 1791 (Europe, North Africa)
- Cryptocephalus rugulipennis Suffrian, 1853 (Europe)
- Cryptocephalus ruralis Weise, 1887 (Asian Russia)
- Cryptocephalus ruri Chujo, 1934
- Cryptocephalus sabahensis Medvedev & Romantsov, 2014
- Cryptocephalus saintpierrei Tappes, 1869 (Algeria)
- Cryptocephalus saliceti Zebe, 1855 (Europe)
- Cryptocephalus samniticus Leonardi & Sassi, 2001 (Italy)
- Cryptocephalus sandrocottus
- Cryptocephalus sanguinicollis Suffrian, 1852 (Western North America)
- Cryptocephalus sarafschanensis Solsky, 1882 (Tajikistan, Kyrgyzstan)
- Cryptocephalus sarawacensis Medvedev, 2011
- Cryptocephalus sareptanus F. Morawitz, 1863 (Palearctic)
- Cryptocephalus saryarkensis Medvedev & Kulenova, 1980 (Kazakhstan)
- Cryptocephalus saucius Truqui, 1852 (Southern Europe, North Africa)
- Cryptocephalus sauteri Chujo, 1934
- Cryptocephalus scapularis Suffrian, 1848 (Europe)
- Cryptocephalus schaefferi Schrank, 1789 (Palearctic)
- Cryptocephalus schreibersii Suffrian, 1852 (Eastern North America)
- Cryptocephalus scitulus
- Cryptocephalus sehestedti Fabricius, 1798 (India, Ceylon, Nepal)
- Cryptocephalus semiargenteus Reitter, 1894 (Palearctic)
- Cryptocephalus semicircularis Suffrian, 1863
- Cryptocephalus senegalensis Suffrian, 1857 (Equatorial and North Africa)
- Cryptocephalus sepilocus Medvedev & Romantsov, 2017
- Cryptocephalus sericeus (Linnaeus, 1758) (Palearctic)
- Cryptocephalus sexmaculatus Olivier, 1791
- Cryptocephalus sexpunctatus (Linnaeus, 1758) (Palearctic)
- Cryptocephalus sexpustulatus (Villers, 1789) (Iberian Peninsula, France)
- Cryptocephalus sexsignatus Fabricius, 1801 (India, Ceylon, Nepal)
- Cryptocephalus shabalinae Lopatin, 1968 (Kyrgyzstan)
- Cryptocephalus signatifrons Suffrian, 1847 (Europe)
- Cryptocephalus sikhimensis Jacoby, 1908 (India, Nepal, Bhutan)
- Cryptocephalus simoni Weise, 1882
- Cryptocephalus simulans Schaeffer, 1906 (Southern United States, Mexico)
- Cryptocephalus sinaita Suffrian, 1854 (Sinai Peninsula)
- Cryptocephalus sindonicus Marseul, 1875
- Cryptocephalus sinuatus Harold, 1872
- Cryptocephalus snowi Schaeffer, 1934 (Southern United States, Mexico)
- Cryptocephalus solingensis Gressitt & Kimoto, 1961 (China)
- Cryptocephalus solivagus Leonardi & Sassi, 2001 (Palearctic)
- Cryptocephalus solus Chujo, 1934
- Cryptocephalus spectator Weise, 1913
- Cryptocephalus spilothorax Jacobson, 1924 (Egypt, Greece)
- Cryptocephalus splendens Kraatz, 1879 (Palearctic)
- Cryptocephalus spurcus Leconte, 1858 (Southwest United States, Europe)
- Cryptocephalus spurius Lopatin, 1956 (Turkmenistan)
- Cryptocephalus stackelbergi Lopatin, 1971 (Kazakhstan)
- Cryptocephalus stragula Rossi, 1794 (Italy)
- Cryptocephalus striatulus Leconte, 1880 (North America)
- Cryptocephalus strigicollis
- Cryptocephalus strigosus Germar, 1824 (Europe)
- Cryptocephalus stschukini Faldermann, 1835 (Palearctic)
- Cryptocephalus suavis Duvivier, 1892 (India, Nepal)
- Cryptocephalus subcostipennis Medvedev & Romantsov, 2017
- Cryptocephalus subnepalensis Lopatin, 1982 (Nepal)
- Cryptocephalus subserricornis Medvedev & Romantsov, 2017
- Cryptocephalus subunicolor Gressitt, 1942 (China)
- Cryptocephalus suffriani Dohrn, 1859 (Central Asia)
- Cryptocephalus sulphureus Olivier, 1808 (Western Mediterranean)
- Cryptocephalus sultani Pic, 1920 (Turkey)
- Cryptocephalus surdus Rapilly, 1980 (Turkey, Iran)
- Cryptocephalus suspectus Baly, 1865
- Cryptocephalus swinhoei Bates, 1866
- Cryptocephalus taiwanus Chujo, 1934
- Cryptocephalus tamaricis Solsky, 1867
- Cryptocephalus tappesi Marseul, 1868 (Turkey, Syria)
- Cryptocephalus tardus Weise, 1888 (Western Alps)
- Cryptocephalus tarsalis Weise, 1887 (Palearctic)
- Cryptocephalus tataricus Gebler, 1841 (Palearctic)
- Cryptocephalus telueticus Escalera, 1914 (Morocco)
- Cryptocephalus terminassianae Lopatin, 1967 (Kazakhstan)
- Cryptocephalus terolensis Pic, 1908
- Cryptocephalus testaceitarsis Pic, 1915 (Turkey)
- Cryptocephalus tetradecaspilotus Baly, 1837
- Cryptocephalus tetraspilus Suffrian, 1851 (Iberian Peninsula, France, Italy)
- Cryptocephalus tetrathyrus Solsky 1872 (Palearctic)
- Cryptocephalus tetredecaspilotus Baly, 1873 (Palearctic)
- Cryptocephalus texanus Schaeffer, 1933 (Texas, Oklahoma, Northern Mexico)
- Cryptocephalus therondi Franz, 1949 (France)
- Cryptocephalus tibialis Brisout de Barneville, 1866 (Iberian Peninsula, France)
- Cryptocephalus tinctus Leconte, 1880 (North America)
- Cryptocephalus tomurensis Duan & Zhou, 2021 (China)
- Cryptocephalus tramuntanae Petitpierre, 1993 (Mediterranean)
- Cryptocephalus transcaucasicus Jacobson, 1898 (Europe)
- Cryptocephalus transiens Franz, 1949
- Cryptocephalus trapezicollis Lindberg, 1953 (Canary Islands)
- Cryptocephalus triangularis Hope, 1831 (Kashmir, India, Nepal, Bhutan, Laos, China)
- Cryptocephalus tricinctus Redtenbacher, 1848 (Kashmir, India, Nepal)
- Cryptocephalus tricolor Rossi, 1792 (Italy, Switzerland)
- Cryptocephalus tricoloratus Jacobson, 1895 (Palearctic)
- Cryptocephalus trifasciatus Fabricius 1787 (Southeast Asia)
- Cryptocephalus trifurcatus Thunberg, 1827 (South Africa)
- Cryptocephalus trimaculatus Rossi, 1790 (Southern Europe, Near East)
- Cryptocephalus tristigma Charpentier, 1825 (Iberian Peninsula, North Africa)
- Cryptocephalus triundulatus White, 1968 (Southwest United States, Mexico)
- Cryptocephalus trivittatus Olivier, 1808 (Eastern United States)
- Cryptocephalus trizonatus Suffrian, 1858 (Texas, Mexico, Central America)
- Cryptocephalus tschimganensis Weise, 1894 (Kazakhstan, Uzbekistan, Kyrgyzstan, Tajikistan)
- Cryptocephalus tshorumae Tomov, 1984 (Turkey)
- Cryptocephalus tubu Chûjô, 1954 (China)
- Cryptocephalus turangae Lopatin, 1961 (Tajikistan)
- Cryptocephalus turcicus Suffrian, 1847 (Southern Europe)
- Cryptocephalus umbonatus Schaeffer, 1906 (Southwest United States, Mexico)
- Cryptocephalus umbrosus Lopatin, 1956 (Iran)
- Cryptocephalus undulatus Suffrian, 1854 (Palearctic)
- Cryptocephalus unifasciatus Jacoby, 1889
- Cryptocephalus vahli Fabricius (India, Sri Lanka)
- Cryptocephalus validicornis Lindberg, 1953
- Cryptocephalus vapidus White, 1968 (Southwest United States, Mexico)
- Cryptocephalus variceps Weise, 1884 (Bulgaria, Turkey, Caucasus)
- Cryptocephalus variegatus Fabricius, 1782 (Europe)
- Cryptocephalus venustus Fabricius, 1787 (North America)
- Cryptocephalus verae Medvedev, 1956 (Turkmenistan)
- Cryptocephalus vidali Peyerimhoff, 1939 (Morocco)
- Cryptocephalus villosulus Suffrian, 1847 (Europe)
- Cryptocephalus violaceus Laicharting, 1781 (Europe)
- Cryptocephalus virens Suffrian, 1847 (Palearctic)
- Cryptocephalus virginiensis White, 1968
- Cryptocephalus viridiceps Pic, 1923 (South Africa)
- Cryptocephalus viridipennis Suffrian, 1852 (Caribbean)
- Cryptocephalus vitraci Fleutiaux & Sallé, 1889
- Cryptocephalus vittatus Fabricius, 1775 (Europe)
- Cryptocephalus vittula Suffrian, 1848 (Palearctic)
- Cryptocephalus volkovitshi Lopatin, 1976 (Armenia, Turkey)
- Cryptocephalus wehnckei Weise, 1882 (Turkey)
- Cryptocephalus weigeli Medvedev, 2015 (China)
- Cryptocephalus xanthocephalus Suffrian, 1863
- Cryptocephalus xanthus Khnzorian, 1968 (Armenia)
- Cryptocephalus yangweii S.-H.Chen, 1942
- Cryptocephalus zaitzevi Lopatin, 1977 (South Caucasus)
- Cryptocephalus zambanellus Marseul, 1875
- Cryptocephalus zejensis Mikhailov, 1999 (Russian Far East)
- Cryptocephalus zinovievi Medvedev, 1973 (Palearctic)
- Cryptocephalus zoiai Sassi, 2001 (France, Italy)
