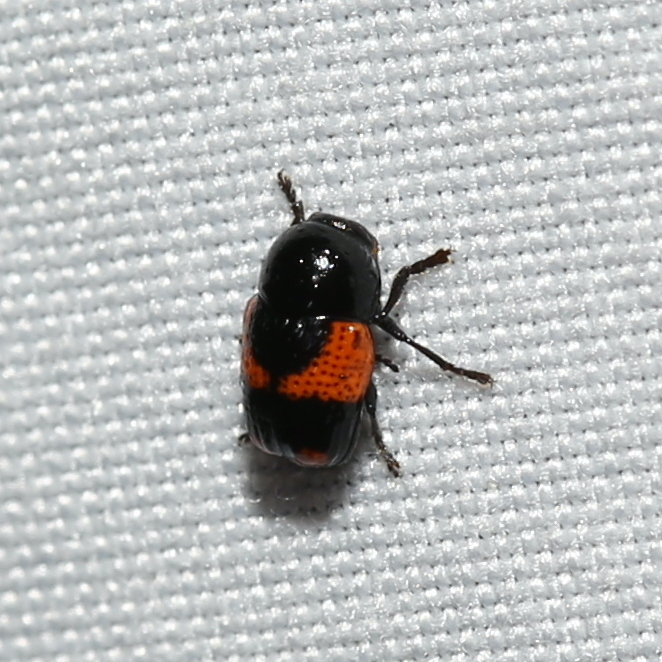

Scientific classification
- Kingdom: Animalia
- Phylum: Arthropoda
- Clade: Pancrustacea
- Class: Insecta
- Order: Coleoptera
- Suborder: Polyphaga
- Infraorder: Cucujiformia
- Family: Chrysomelidae
- Genus: Cryptocephalus
- Species: C. binominis

Binomial name
- Cryptocephalus binominis Newman, 1841

= Cryptocephalus binominis =

Species of beetle

Cryptocephalus binominis is a species of case-bearing leaf beetle in the family Chrysomelidae. It is found in North America.

== Subspecies ==
These two subspecies belong to the species Cryptocephalus binominis:

- Cryptocephalus binominis binominis Newman, 1841
- Cryptocephalus binominis rufibasis Schaeffer, 1933
