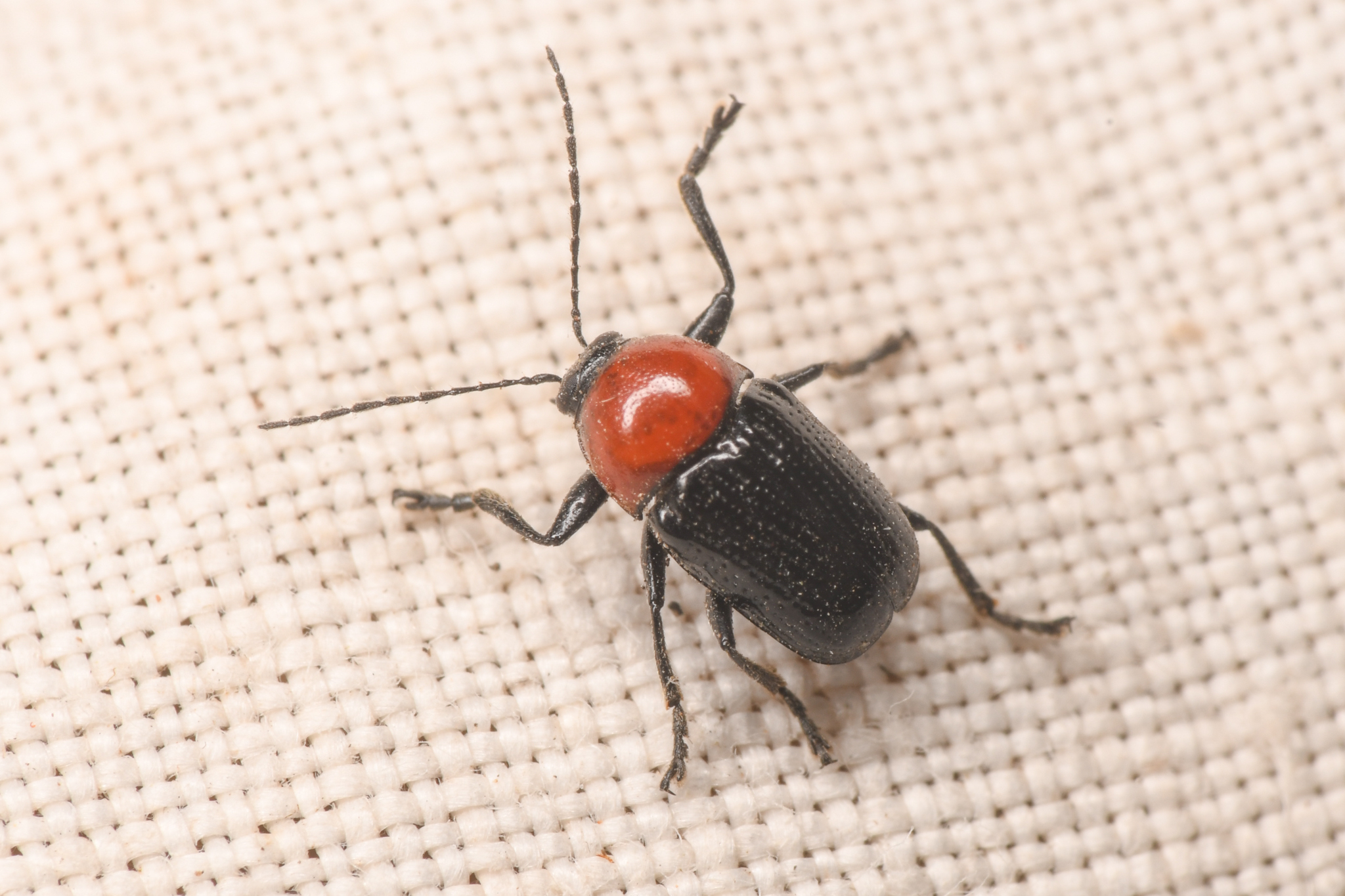

Scientific classification
- Kingdom: Animalia
- Phylum: Arthropoda
- Clade: Pancrustacea
- Class: Insecta
- Order: Coleoptera
- Suborder: Polyphaga
- Infraorder: Cucujiformia
- Family: Chrysomelidae
- Genus: Cryptocephalus
- Species: C. sanguinicollis

Binomial name
- Cryptocephalus sanguinicollis Suffrian, 1852

= Cryptocephalus sanguinicollis =

Species of beetle

Cryptocephalus sanguinicollis is a species of case-bearing leaf beetle in the family Chrysomelidae. It is found in Central America and North America.

== Subspecies ==
These three subspecies belong to the species Cryptocephalus sanguinicollis:

- Cryptocephalus sanguinicollis nigerrimus Crotch, 1874^{i c g b}
- Cryptocephalus sanguinicollis sanguinicollis Suffrian, 1852^{i c g b}
- Cryptocephalus sanguinicollis schreibersii Suffrian, 1852^{g}

Data sources: i = ITIS, c = Catalogue of Life, g = GBIF, b = Bugguide.net
