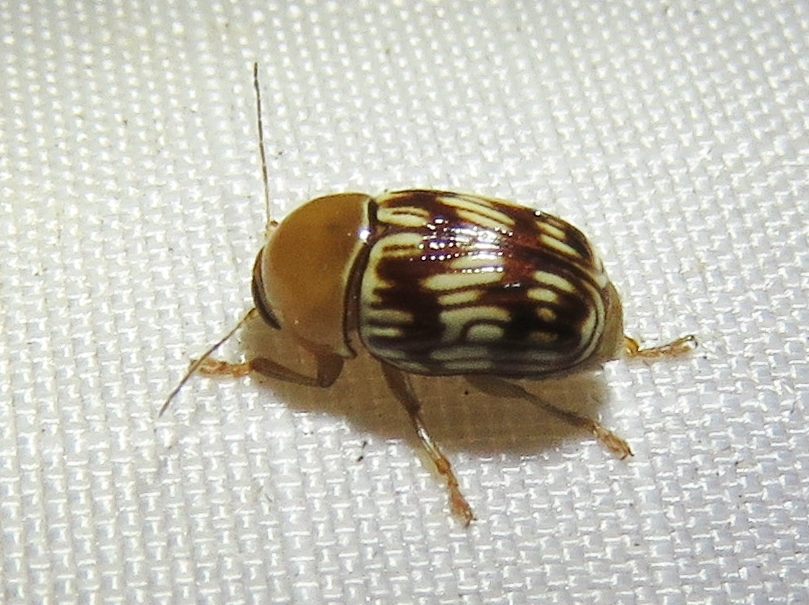

Scientific classification
- Kingdom: Animalia
- Phylum: Arthropoda
- Clade: Pancrustacea
- Class: Insecta
- Order: Coleoptera
- Suborder: Polyphaga
- Infraorder: Cucujiformia
- Family: Chrysomelidae
- Genus: Cryptocephalus
- Species: C. fulguratus

Binomial name
- Cryptocephalus fulguratus J. L. LeConte, 1880

= Cryptocephalus fulguratus =

Species of beetle

Cryptocephalus fulguratus is a species of case-bearing leaf beetle in the family Chrysomelidae. It is found in North America. Larvae feed on decaying wood.
