= Cryptocephalus amatus =

Scientific classification
- Kingdom: Animalia
- Phylum: Arthropoda
- Clade: Pancrustacea
- Class: Insecta
- Order: Coleoptera
- Suborder: Polyphaga
- Infraorder: Cucujiformia
- Family: Chrysomelidae
- Genus: Cryptocephalus
- Species: C. amatus

Binomial name
- Cryptocephalus amatus Haldeman, 1849

Species of beetle

Cryptocephalus amatus is a species of case-bearing leaf beetle in the family Chrysomelidae. It is found in North America.

== Subspecies ==
Three subspecies belong to the species Cryptocephalus amatus:

- Cryptocephalus amatus amatus Haldeman, 1849^{i c g}
- Cryptocephalus amatus apicedens Fall, 1932^{i c g}
- Cryptocephalus amatus fractilineatus R. White, 1968^{i c g}

Data sources: i = ITIS, c = Catalogue of Life, g = GBIF, b = Bugguide.net
