= Cryptocephalus sarawacensis =

Scientific classification
- Kingdom: Animalia
- Phylum: Arthropoda
- Clade: Pancrustacea
- Class: Insecta
- Order: Coleoptera
- Suborder: Polyphaga
- Infraorder: Cucujiformia
- Family: Chrysomelidae
- Genus: Cryptocephalus
- Species: C. sarawacensis

Binomial name
- Cryptocephalus sarawacensis L.Medvedev, 2011

Species of beetle

Cryptocephalus sarawacensis is a species of leaf beetle in the genus Cryptocephalus found in Singapore and Borneo.

== Appearance ==
This species is an overall a dark brown sienna color that gradually lightens as the abdomen gets thinner towards the back. The beetle looks overall like a cross between a leaf beetle and a scarab beetle, which is most noted in the little diamond in its joiner. It also has two eyespots that are square like with small peppering around it.
