= Cryptocephalus simulans =

Scientific classification
- Kingdom: Animalia
- Phylum: Arthropoda
- Clade: Pancrustacea
- Class: Insecta
- Order: Coleoptera
- Suborder: Polyphaga
- Infraorder: Cucujiformia
- Family: Chrysomelidae
- Genus: Cryptocephalus
- Species: C. simulans

Binomial name
- Cryptocephalus simulans Schaeffer, 1906

Species of beetle

Cryptocephalus simulans is a species of case-bearing leaf beetle in the family Chrysomelidae. It is found in North America.

== Subspecies ==
These four subspecies belong to the species Cryptocephalus simulans:

- Cryptocephalus simulans conjungens Schaeffer, 1934
- Cryptocephalus simulans conjungeus Schaeffer
- Cryptocephalus simulans eluticollis Schaeffer, 1934
- Cryptocephalus simulans simulans Schaeffer, 1906
