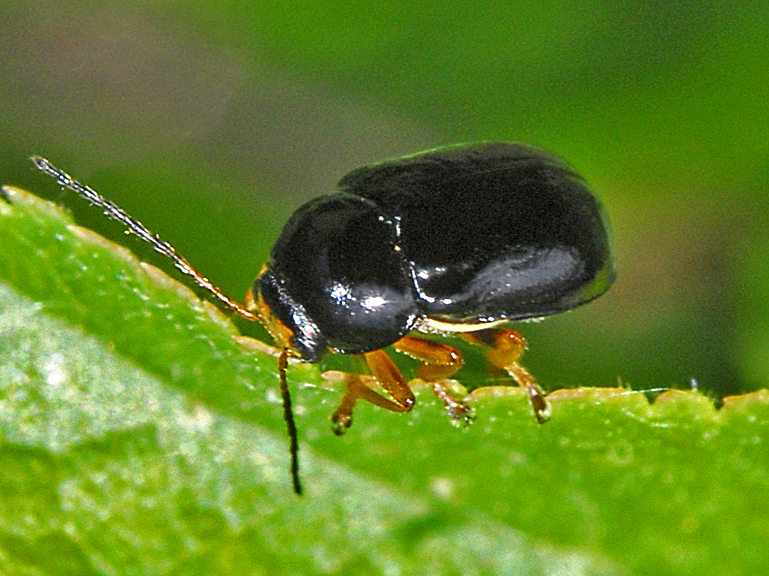

Scientific classification
- Kingdom: Animalia
- Phylum: Arthropoda
- Clade: Pancrustacea
- Class: Insecta
- Order: Coleoptera
- Suborder: Polyphaga
- Infraorder: Cucujiformia
- Family: Chrysomelidae
- Genus: Cryptocephalus
- Species: C. flavipes

Binomial name
- Cryptocephalus flavipes Fabricius, 1781

Synonyms
- Cryptocephalus wydleri Faldermann, 1837

= Cryptocephalus flavipes =

Species of beetle

Cryptocephalus flavipes is a beetle belonging to the family Cryptocephalus.

== Etymology ==
The genus name Cryptocephalus derives from Greek kryptós meaning hidden, and kephalē, meaning head. The Latin species name flavipes refers to the color of legs. It derives from flavus meaning yellow, and pēs meaning foot.

== Distribution ==
This species can be found in Southern Europe, Asia Minor, Caucasus, Southern Russia and Central Asia east to Altai.

== Description ==
Cryptocephalus flavipes can reach a length of 3–5.5 millimetres (0.12–0.22 in). Females are bigger than males. The basic body color is black, with yellow head and legs. Pronotum is convex, with lateral margins partly visible from above. The lateral margins of the body show a narrow, yellow stripe in males, while in females pronotum is completely black.

This species is rather similar to Cryptocephalus bameuli.

== Biology ==
Adults can be found from April to July.
