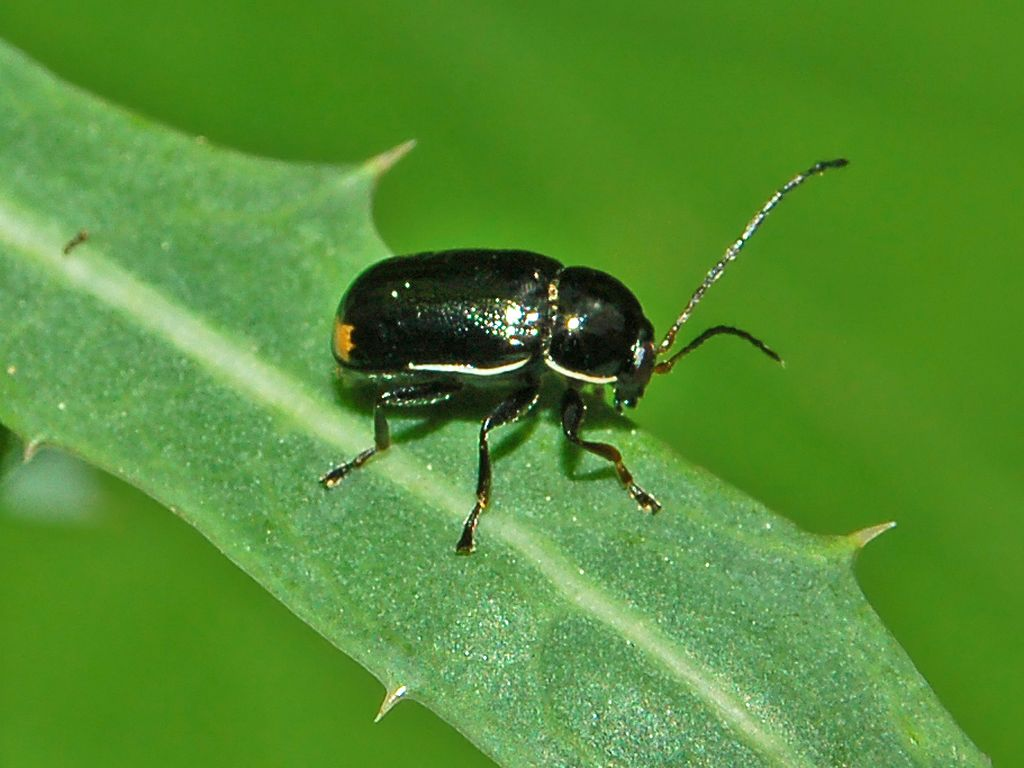

Scientific classification
- Domain: Eukaryota
- Kingdom: Animalia
- Phylum: Arthropoda
- Class: Insecta
- Order: Coleoptera
- Suborder: Polyphaga
- Infraorder: Cucujiformia
- Family: Chrysomelidae
- Genus: Cryptocephalus
- Species: C. renatae

Binomial name
- Cryptocephalus renatae Sassi, 2001

= Cryptocephalus renatae =

Species of beetle

Cryptocephalus renatae is a cylindrical leaf beetle belonging to the family Chrysomelidae, subfamily Cryptocephalinae. The species was first described by Davide Sassi in 2001.

They are found mostly in Italy and North Macedonia.
