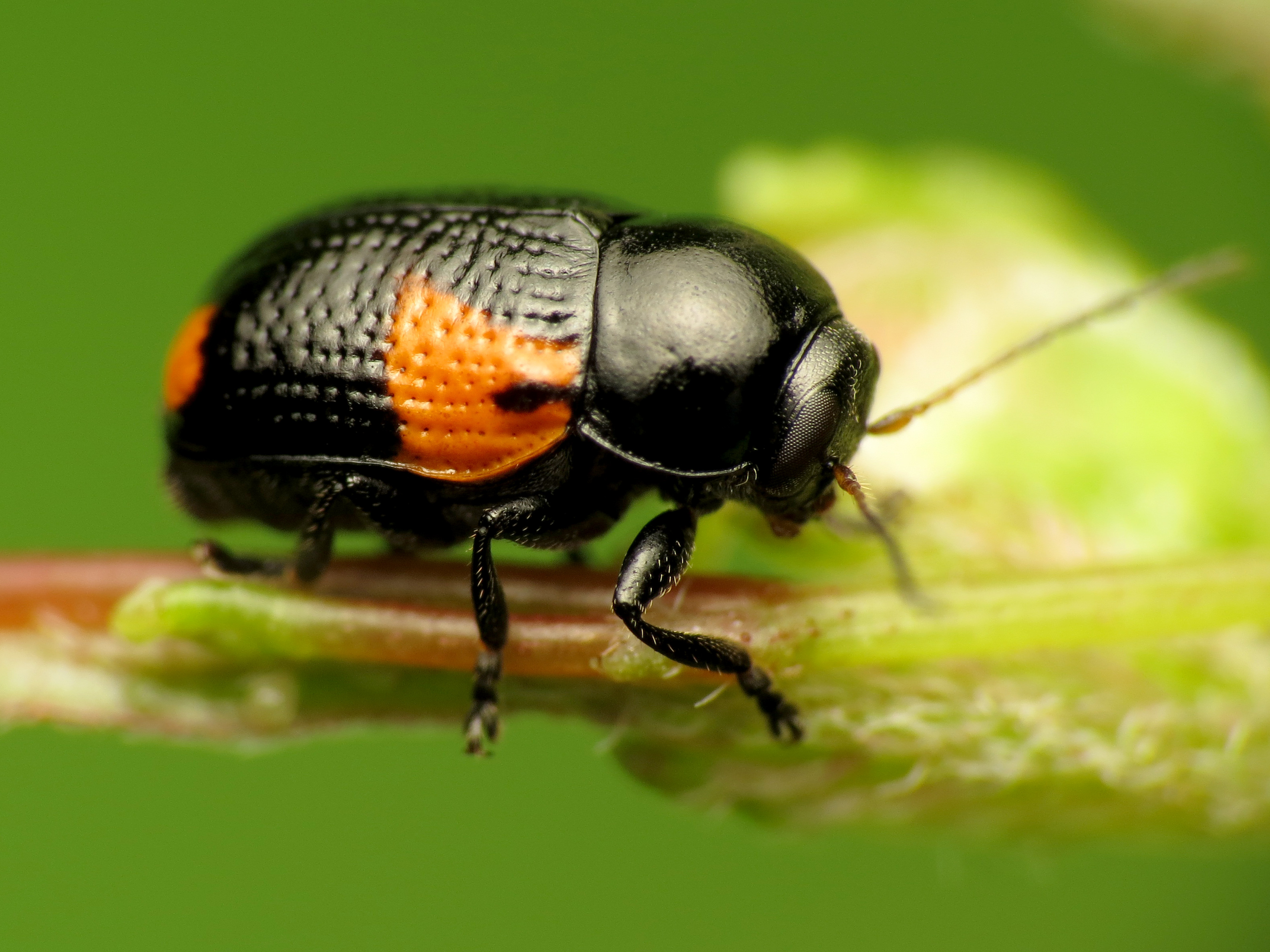

Scientific classification
- Kingdom: Animalia
- Phylum: Arthropoda
- Clade: Pancrustacea
- Class: Insecta
- Order: Coleoptera
- Suborder: Polyphaga
- Infraorder: Cucujiformia
- Family: Chrysomelidae
- Genus: Cryptocephalus
- Species: C. quadruplex

Binomial name
- Cryptocephalus quadruplex Newman, 1841

= Cryptocephalus quadruplex =

Species of beetle

Cryptocephalus quadruplex is a species of case-bearing leaf beetle in the family Chrysomelidae. It is found in North America.

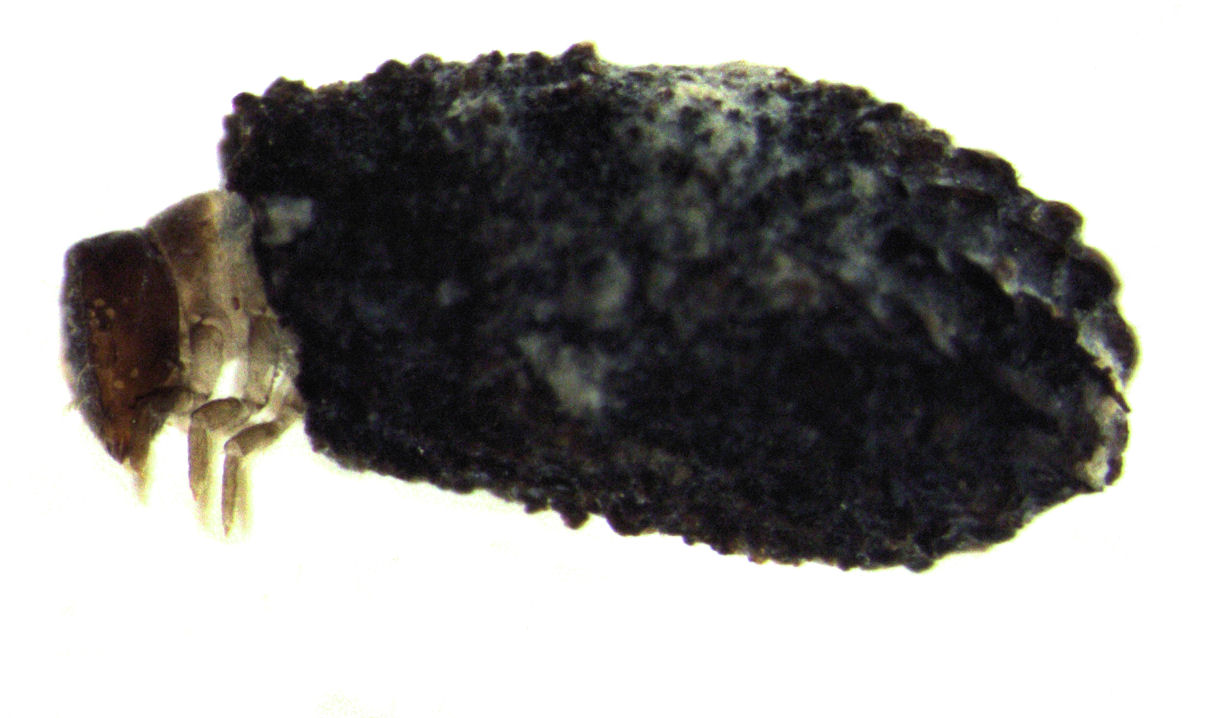
Cryptocephaline larva in its case

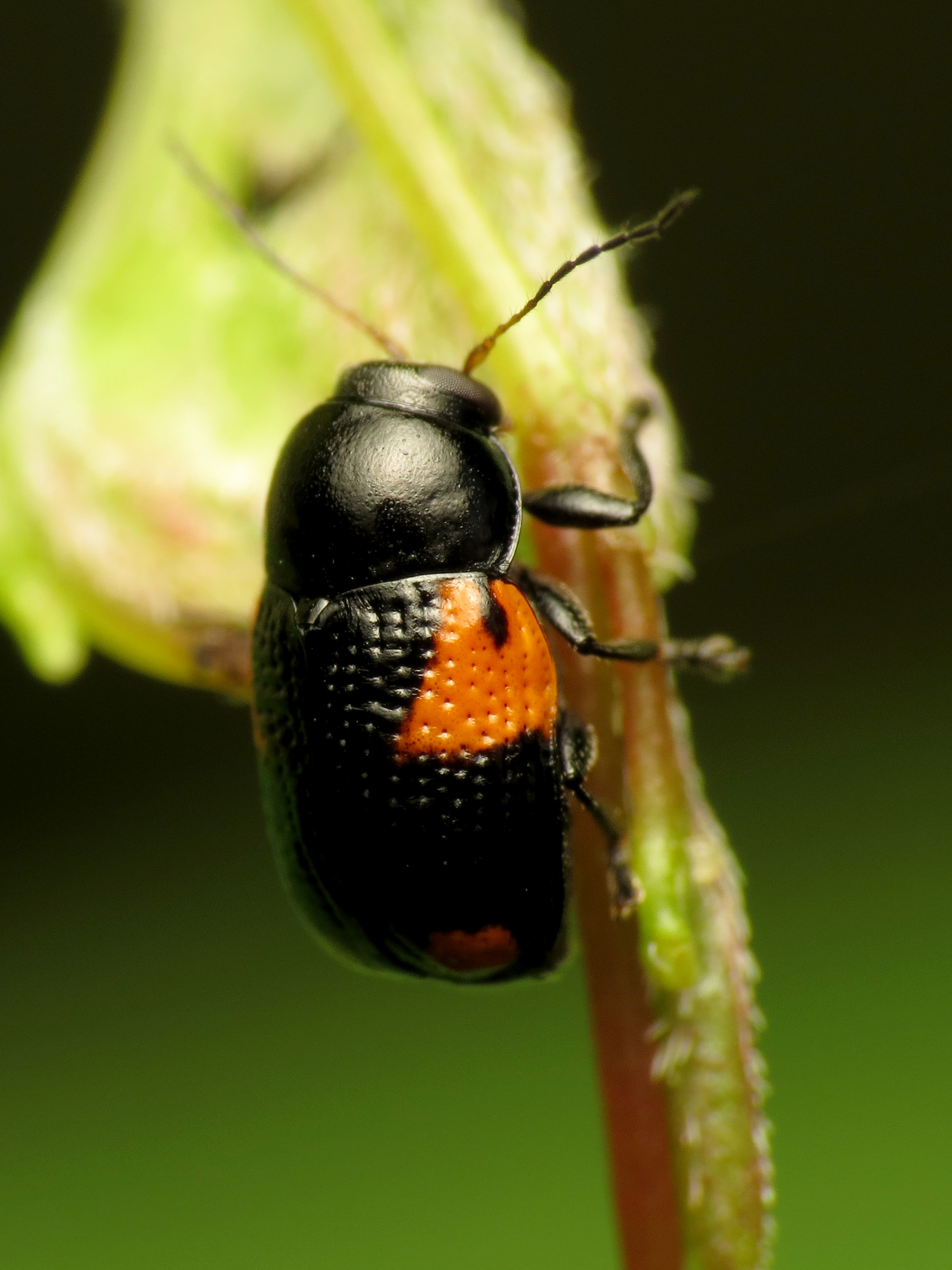

Case-bearing leaf beetles are named so because the larvae construct protective cases from their fecal matter and sometimes plant debris.
