= Cryptocephalus merus =

Scientific classification
- Kingdom: Animalia
- Phylum: Arthropoda
- Clade: Pancrustacea
- Class: Insecta
- Order: Coleoptera
- Suborder: Polyphaga
- Infraorder: Cucujiformia
- Family: Chrysomelidae
- Genus: Cryptocephalus
- Species: C. merus

Binomial name
- Cryptocephalus merus Fall, 1932

Species of beetle

Cryptocephalus merus is a species of case-bearing leaf beetle in the family Chrysomelidae. It is found in Arizona and Texas (the United States of the America), possibly also in Mexico. It measures 3.8–4.3 mm (0.15–0.17 in) in length.
