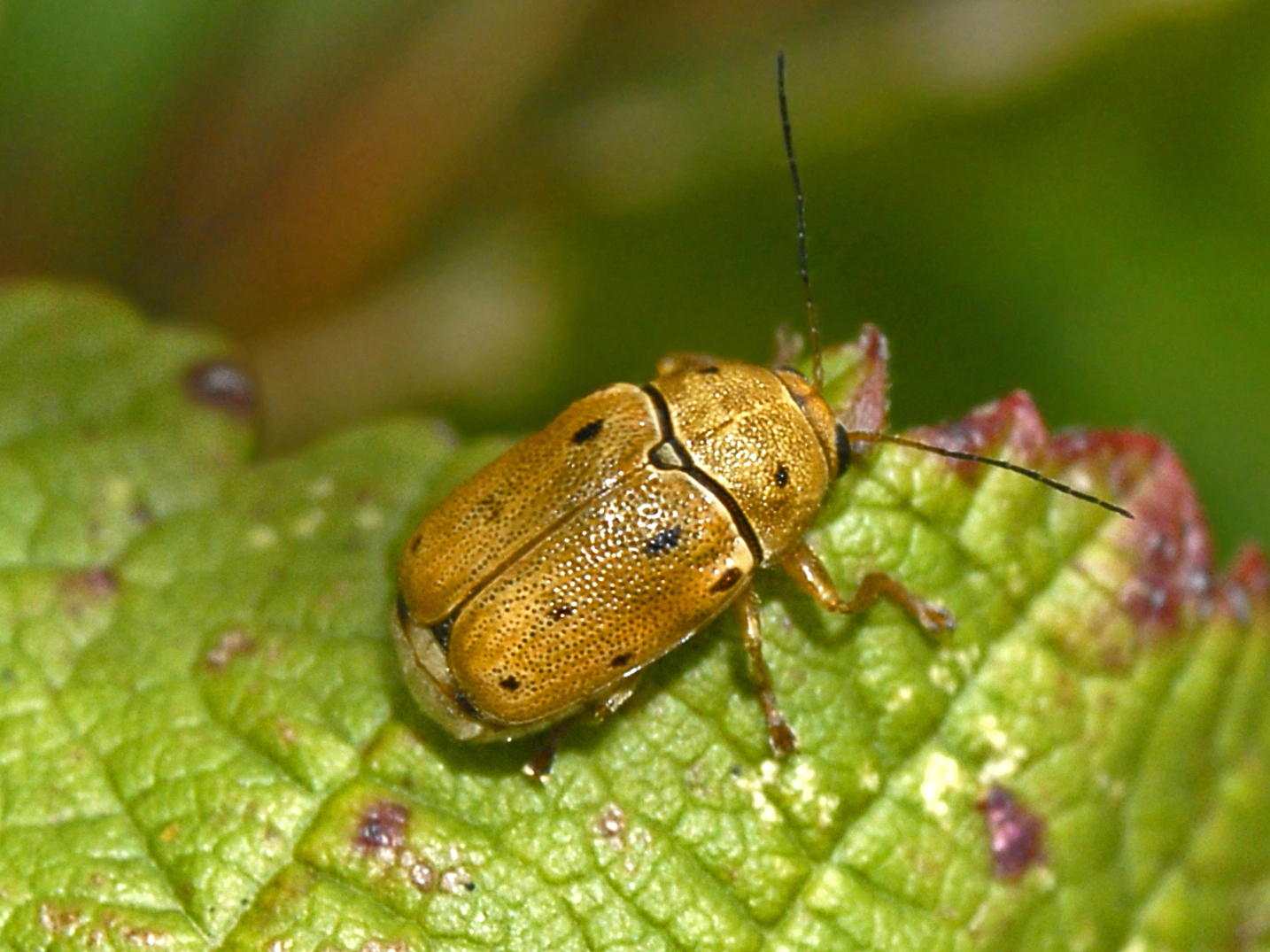
- Male of Cryptocephalus octomaculatus

Scientific classification
- Kingdom: Animalia
- Phylum: Arthropoda
- Clade: Pancrustacea
- Class: Insecta
- Order: Coleoptera
- Suborder: Polyphaga
- Infraorder: Cucujiformia
- Family: Chrysomelidae
- Genus: Cryptocephalus
- Species: C. octomaculatus

Binomial name
- Cryptocephalus octomaculatus Rossi, 1790

Synonyms
- Cryptocephalus quinquepunctatus Harrer, 1784 nec Scopoli 1763; Cryptocephalus 8-maculatus Rossi, 1790: 96.; Cryptocephalus 12 punctatus Fabricius, 1792: 67.

= Cryptocephalus octomaculatus =

Species of beetle

Cryptocephalus octomaculatus is a species of cylindrical leaf beetles belonging to the family Chrysomelidae and the subfamily Cryptocephalinae.

== Description ==
Cryptocephalus octomaculatus can reach a length of about 6 millimetres (0.24 in). The basic color of their pronotum and elytra is pale brown. Their elytra show eight small blackish spots (hence the species name octomaculatus meaning with eight stains in Latin). The aberration duodecimpunctatus Fabricius 1792 bears an additional spot at the apex of the elytra.

Beetles of this species can be found from July to September on the twigs and leaves of oak, birch and hazel, where they are a European parasite.

== Distribution ==
This species can be found in Bosnia, Bulgaria, Croatia, Czech Republic, France, Germany, Hungary, Italy, Poland, Romania, Slovakia, former Yugoslavia, Ukraine and in the Near East.
