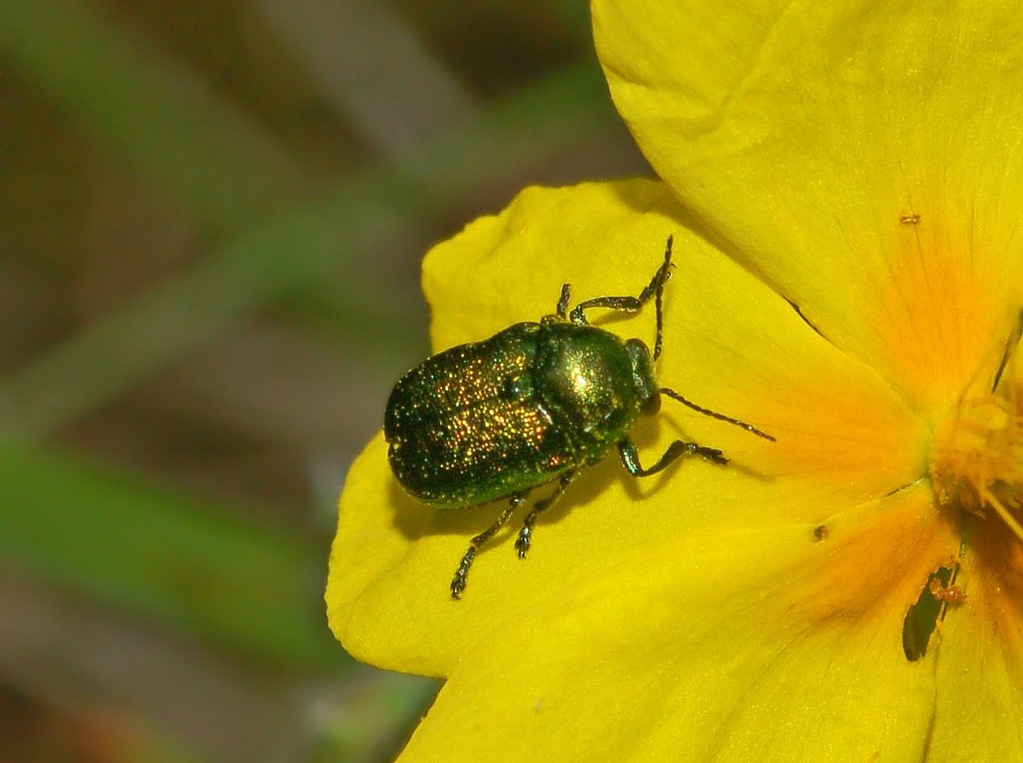

Scientific classification
- Domain: Eukaryota
- Kingdom: Animalia
- Phylum: Arthropoda
- Class: Insecta
- Order: Coleoptera
- Suborder: Polyphaga
- Infraorder: Cucujiformia
- Family: Chrysomelidae
- Genus: Cryptocephalus
- Species: C. samniticus

Binomial name
- Cryptocephalus samniticus Leonardi & Sassi, 2001

= Cryptocephalus samniticus =

Species of beetle

Cryptocephalus samniticus is a cylindrical leaf beetle belonging to the family Chrysomelidae and the subfamily Cryptocephalinae. The species was first described by Carlo Leonardi and Davide Sassi in 2001.

This species is found in most of Italy.
