= Cryptocephalus cerinus =

Scientific classification
- Kingdom: Animalia
- Phylum: Arthropoda
- Clade: Pancrustacea
- Class: Insecta
- Order: Coleoptera
- Suborder: Polyphaga
- Infraorder: Cucujiformia
- Family: Chrysomelidae
- Genus: Cryptocephalus
- Species: C. cerinus

Binomial name
- Cryptocephalus cerinus B. White, 1937

Species of beetle

Cryptocephalus cerinus is a species of case-bearing leaf beetle in the family Chrysomelidae. It is found in North America.

== Subspecies ==
These two subspecies belong to the species Cryptocephalus cerinus:

- Cryptocephalus cerinus cerinus B. White, 1937
- Cryptocephalus cerinus nevadensis B. White, 1937
