= Cryptocephalus binotatus =

Scientific classification
- Kingdom: Animalia
- Phylum: Arthropoda
- Clade: Pancrustacea
- Class: Insecta
- Order: Coleoptera
- Suborder: Polyphaga
- Infraorder: Cucujiformia
- Family: Chrysomelidae
- Genus: Cryptocephalus
- Species: C. binotatus

Binomial name
- Cryptocephalus binotatus R. White, 1968

Species of beetle

Cryptocephalus binotatus is a species of case-bearing leaf beetle in the family Chrysomelidae. It is found in North America.
