= Cryptocephalus spurcus =

Scientific classification
- Kingdom: Animalia
- Phylum: Arthropoda
- Clade: Pancrustacea
- Class: Insecta
- Order: Coleoptera
- Suborder: Polyphaga
- Infraorder: Cucujiformia
- Family: Chrysomelidae
- Genus: Cryptocephalus
- Species: C. spurcus

Binomial name
- Cryptocephalus spurcus J. L. LeConte, 1858

Species of beetle

Cryptocephalus spurcus is a species of case-bearing leaf beetle in the family Chrysomelidae. It is found in North America.

== Subspecies ==
These two subspecies belong to the species Cryptocephalus spurcus:

- Cryptocephalus spurcus spurcus J. L. LeConte, 1858
- Cryptocephalus spurcus vandykei B. White, 1937
