= Cryptocephalus nigrocinctus =

Scientific classification
- Kingdom: Animalia
- Phylum: Arthropoda
- Clade: Pancrustacea
- Class: Insecta
- Order: Coleoptera
- Suborder: Polyphaga
- Infraorder: Cucujiformia
- Family: Chrysomelidae
- Genus: Cryptocephalus
- Species: C. nigrocinctus

Binomial name
- Cryptocephalus nigrocinctus Suffrian, 1852

Species of beetle

Cryptocephalus nigrocinctus is a species of case-bearing leaf beetle in the family Chrysomelidae. It is found in the Caribbean Sea and North America.
