= Cryptocephalus brunneovittatus =

Scientific classification
- Kingdom: Animalia
- Phylum: Arthropoda
- Clade: Pancrustacea
- Class: Insecta
- Order: Coleoptera
- Suborder: Polyphaga
- Infraorder: Cucujiformia
- Family: Chrysomelidae
- Genus: Cryptocephalus
- Species: C. brunneovittatus

Binomial name
- Cryptocephalus brunneovittatus Schaeffer, 1904

Species of beetle

Cryptocephalus brunneovittatus is a species of case-bearing leaf beetle in the family Chrysomelidae. It is found in Central America and North America.
