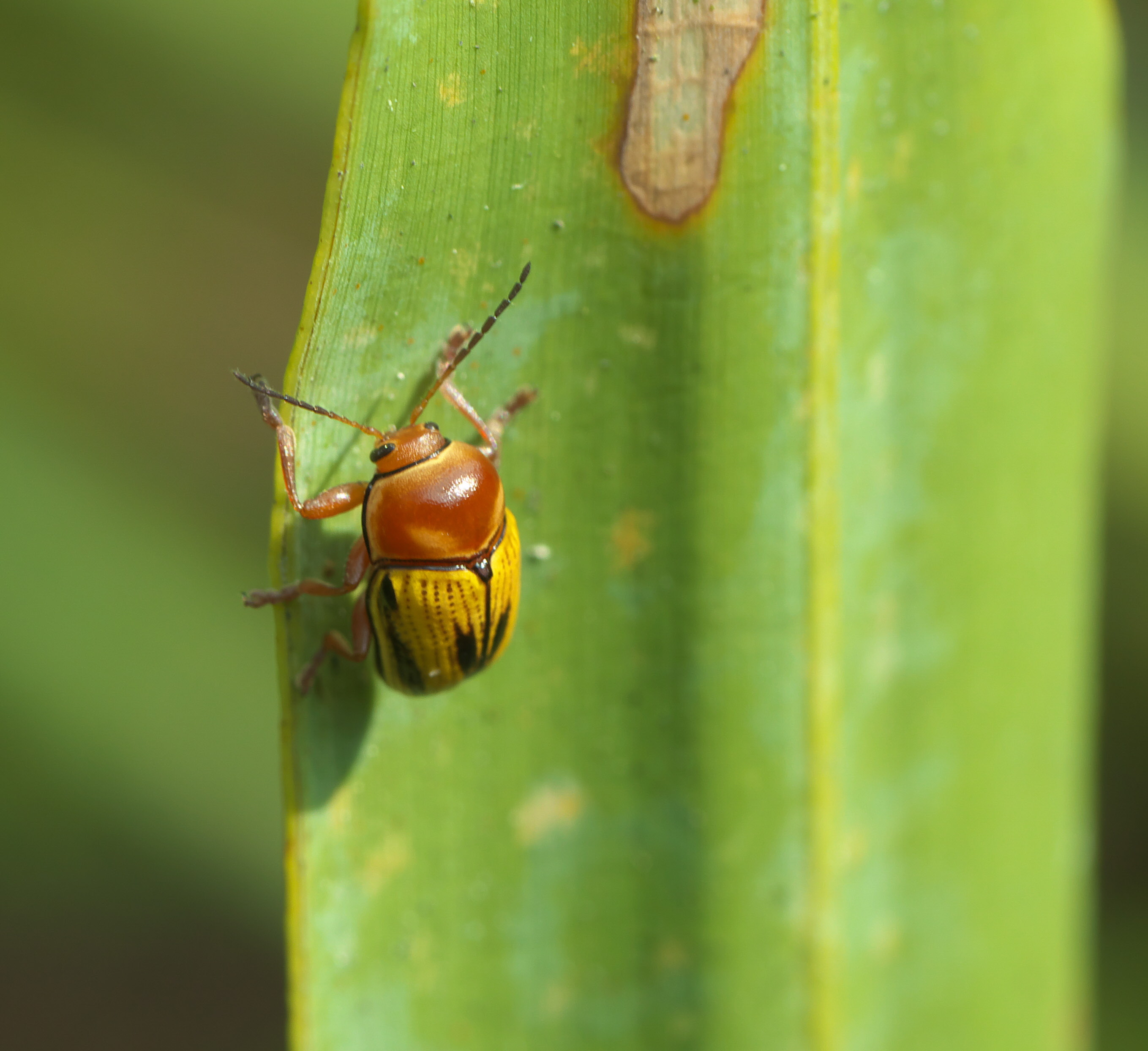

Scientific classification
- Kingdom: Animalia
- Phylum: Arthropoda
- Clade: Pancrustacea
- Class: Insecta
- Order: Coleoptera
- Suborder: Polyphaga
- Infraorder: Cucujiformia
- Family: Chrysomelidae
- Genus: Cryptocephalus
- Species: C. gibbicollis

Binomial name
- Cryptocephalus gibbicollis Haldeman, 1849

= Cryptocephalus gibbicollis =

Species of beetle

Cryptocephalus gibbicollis is a species of case-bearing leaf beetle in the family Chrysomelidae. It is found in North America.

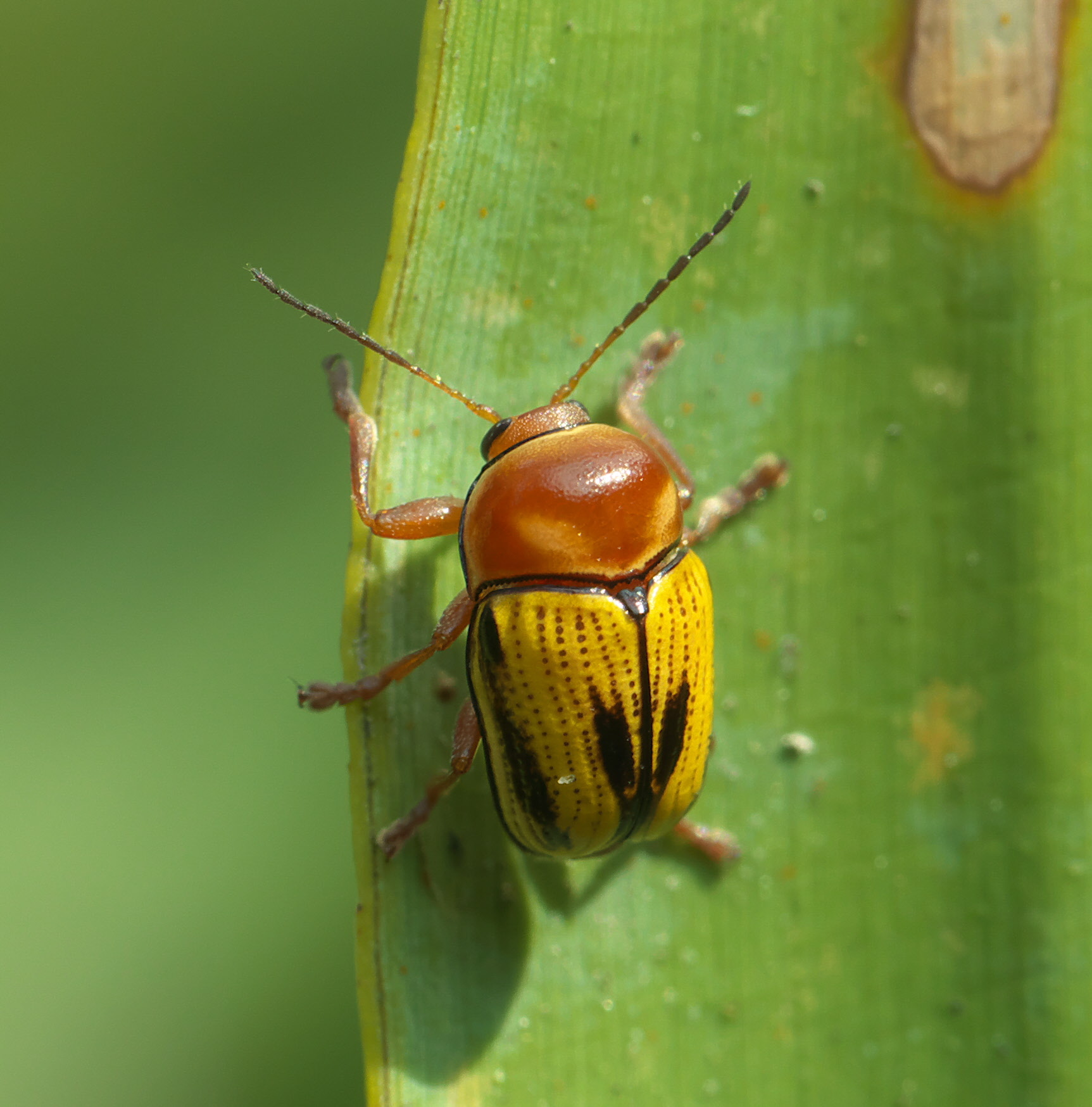

== Subspecies ==
These three subspecies belong to the species Cryptocephalus gibbicollis:

- Cryptocephalus gibbicollis decrescens R. White, 1968
- Cryptocephalus gibbicollis decrestens White
- Cryptocephalus gibbicollis gibbicollis Haldeman, 1849
