= Cryptocephalus cribripennis =

Scientific classification
- Kingdom: Animalia
- Phylum: Arthropoda
- Clade: Pancrustacea
- Class: Insecta
- Order: Coleoptera
- Suborder: Polyphaga
- Infraorder: Cucujiformia
- Family: Chrysomelidae
- Tribe: Cryptocephalini
- Genus: Cryptocephalus
- Species: C. cribripennis

Binomial name
- Cryptocephalus cribripennis J. L. LeConte, 1880

Species of beetle

Cryptocephalus cribripennis is a species leaf beetle found in Central America and North America. The specific epithet cribripennis (from Latin cribro 'sieve' and penna 'wing') refers to its large, sparse elytral punctures.
