= Cadmus (disambiguation) =

Cadmus or Kadmos may refer to:

== Ancient period ==
- Cadmus, in Greek mythology the son of Agenor, king of Tyre and brother of Europa
- Cadmus of Miletus, a 6th-century BC logographer
- Mount Cadmus, a mountain in Asia Minor
- Cadmus (river), the ancient name for the river that flowed from Mount Cadmus
- Cadmus of Kos, tyrant of Zancle, son of Scythes
- Cadmus, a city in Syria, more often transliterated as Qadmus today
- Kadmos (journal), a German journal, specialising in pre-Greek and early Greek epigraphy

== Modern people ==
- Paul Cadmus, American artist
- Cornelius A. Cadmus (1844–1902), American politician from New Jersey
- Thomas Cadmus (1736–1821), American businessman and soldier from New Jersey
- Cadmus Wilcox, American Confederate general

== Other ==
- Cadmus Peverell, a character in the Harry Potter series
- Cadmus, Kansas, a community in the United States
- Cadmus, Michigan, an unincorporated community
- Project Cadmus, a fictional government organization in DC Comics
- Cadmus (journal), an economic/humanitarian journal.
- Cadmus (computer), a German Unix minicomputer brand in 1980s and 1990s build by Periphere Computer Systeme
- HMS Cadmus, five ships of the Royal Navy
- Cadmus (1813 ship) merchant ship launched at Sunderland that made two whaling voyages (1827-1834) and that was lost in 1835
- Cadmus (genus), a genus of leaf beetles

== See also ==
- Cadmos (disambiguation)
