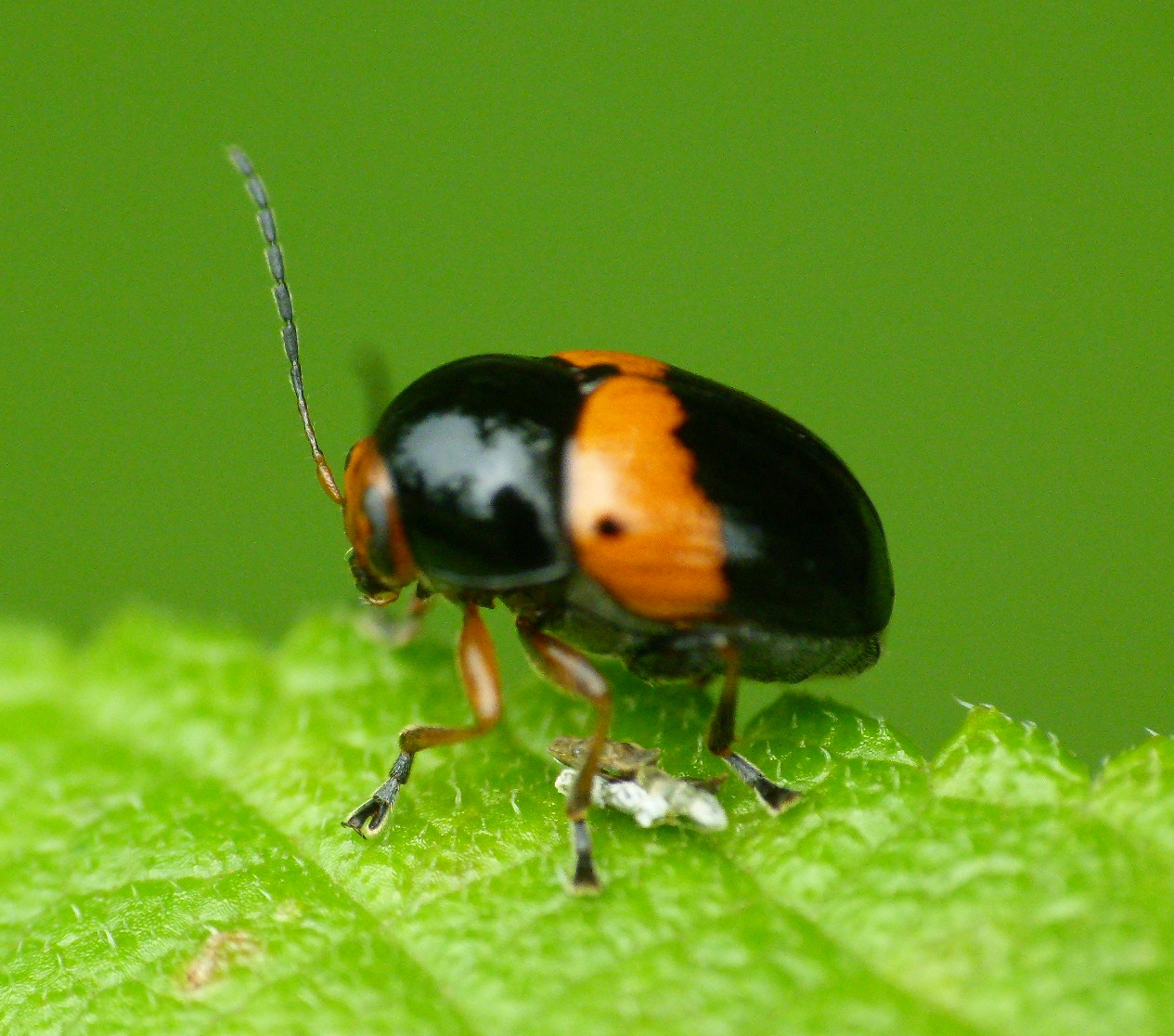
- From Kerala

Scientific classification
- Kingdom: Animalia
- Phylum: Arthropoda
- Clade: Pancrustacea
- Class: Insecta
- Order: Coleoptera
- Suborder: Polyphaga
- Infraorder: Cucujiformia
- Family: Chrysomelidae
- Genus: Cryptocephalus
- Species: C. lefevrei

Binomial name
- Cryptocephalus lefevrei Jacoby, 1895

= Cryptocephalus lefevrei =

Species of beetle

Cryptocephalus lefevrei is a species of leaf-beetle from Southern India.
