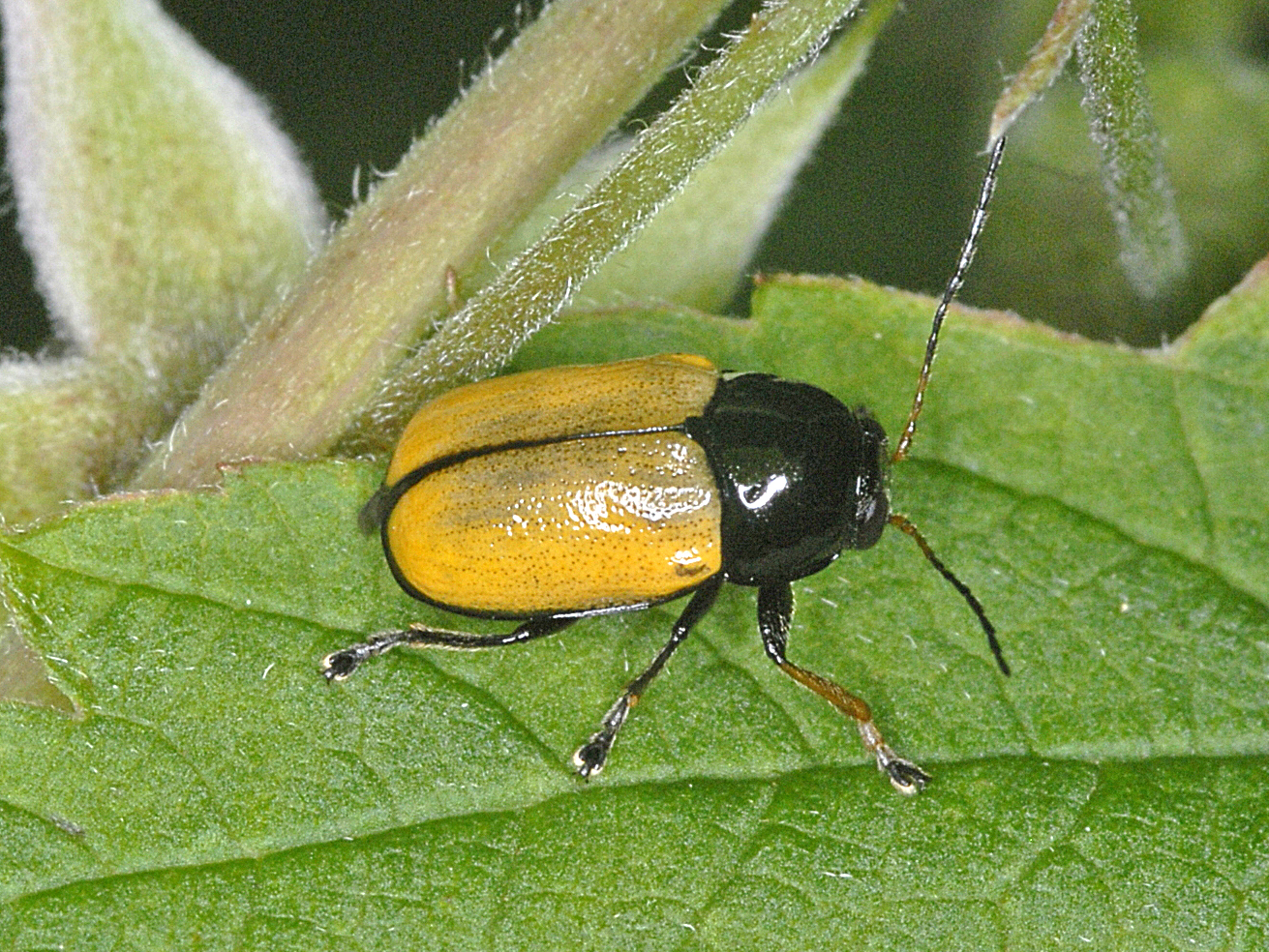
- Female

Scientific classification
- Kingdom: Animalia
- Phylum: Arthropoda
- Clade: Pancrustacea
- Class: Insecta
- Order: Coleoptera
- Suborder: Polyphaga
- Infraorder: Cucujiformia
- Family: Chrysomelidae
- Genus: Cryptocephalus
- Species: C. marginatus

Binomial name
- Cryptocephalus marginatus Fabricius, 1781

Synonyms
- Cryptocephalus terminatus Germar, 1824

= Cryptocephalus marginatus =

Species of beetle

Cryptocephalus marginatus is a cylindrical leaf beetle belonging to the family Chrysomelidae, subfamily Cryptocephalinae. The species was first described by Johan Christian Fabricius in 1781.

== Description ==
Cryptocephalus marginatus can reach a length of 3.5 – 5 mm. This species shows an evident sexual dimorphism. The females are generally much larger than males. The males usually are black with blue metallic reflections, while the females have yellow elytra with black margins.

Adults can be found from May to August in the lowlands and in the lower parts of mountains on Betula verrucosa, Alnus viridis, Sorbus aucuparia and various species of oaks.

== Distribution ==
This species is present in Austria, Belgium, Bosnia, Bulgaria, Croatia, the Czech Republic, Finland, France, Germany, Hungary, Italy, Poland, Romania, Russia, Slovenia, Spain, Switzerland, the Netherlands and in the former Yugoslavia.
