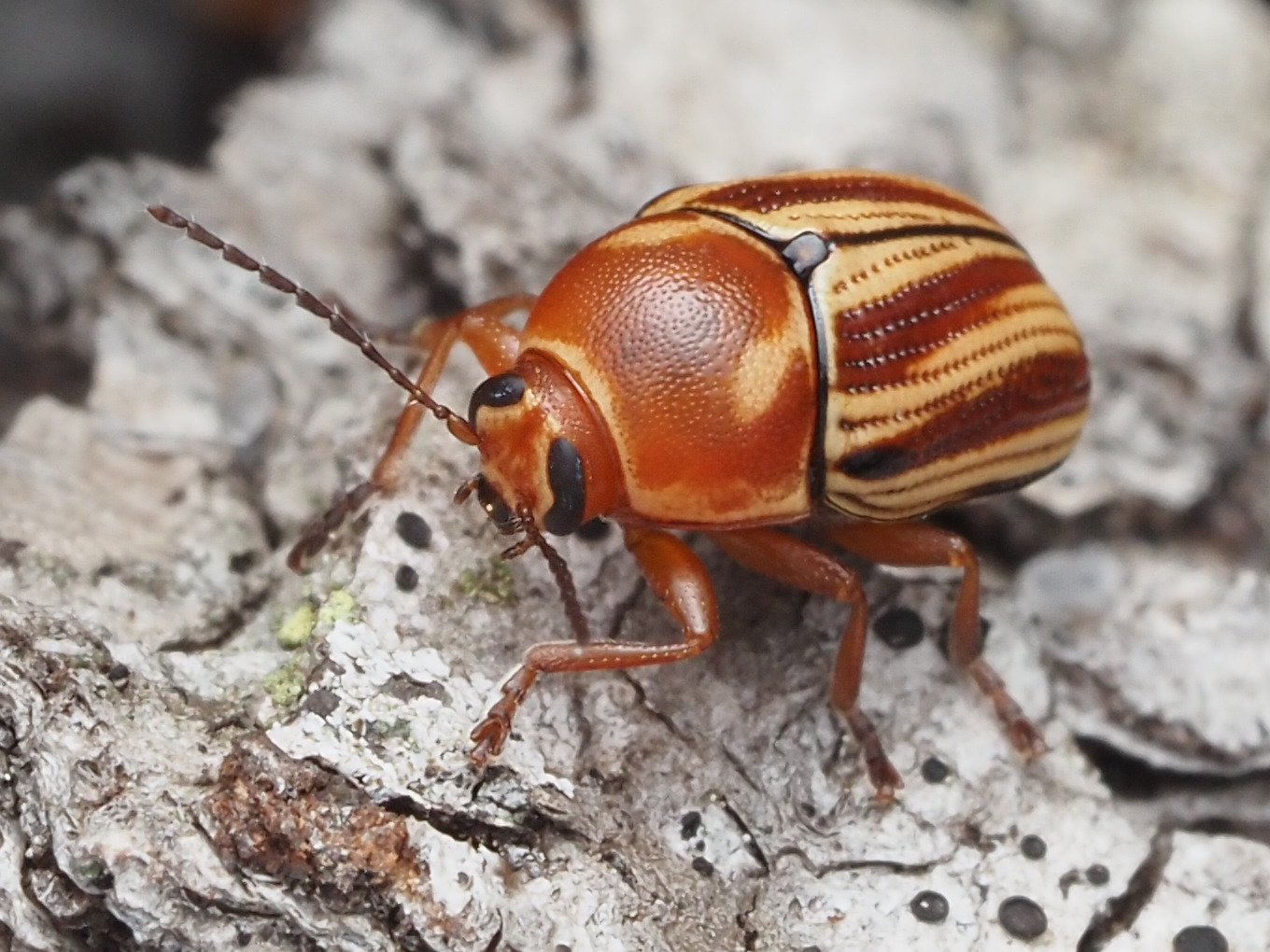
- Cryptocephalus obsoletus

Scientific classification
- Kingdom: Animalia
- Phylum: Arthropoda
- Clade: Pancrustacea
- Class: Insecta
- Order: Coleoptera
- Suborder: Polyphaga
- Infraorder: Cucujiformia
- Family: Chrysomelidae
- Genus: Cryptocephalus
- Species: C. obsoletus

Binomial name
- Cryptocephalus obsoletus Germar, 1824

= Cryptocephalus obsoletus =

Species of beetle

Cryptocephalus obsoletus is a species of case-bearing leaf beetle in the family Chrysomelidae. It is found in North America.

== Subspecies ==
These two subspecies belong to the species Cryptocephalus obsoletus:

- Cryptocephalus obsoletus indistinctus R. White, 1968
- Cryptocephalus obsoletus obsoletus Germar, 1824
