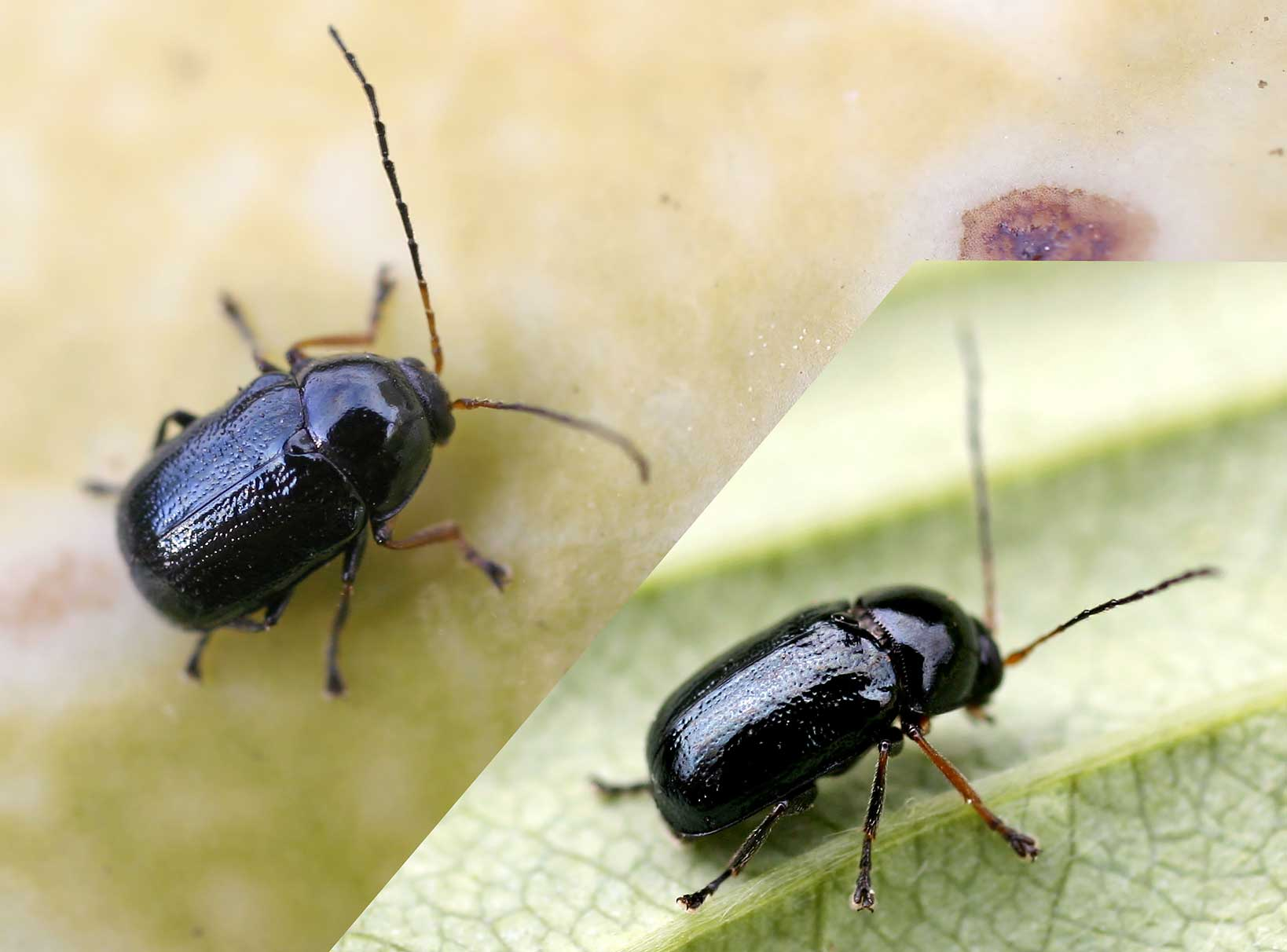
- Cryptocephalus nitidus

Scientific classification
- Kingdom: Animalia
- Phylum: Arthropoda
- Clade: Pancrustacea
- Class: Insecta
- Order: Coleoptera
- Suborder: Polyphaga
- Infraorder: Cucujiformia
- Family: Chrysomelidae
- Subfamily: Cryptocephalinae
- Tribe: Cryptocephalini; Gyllenhaal, 1813

Genera
- Several, see text

= Cryptocephalini =

Tribe of beetles

The Cryptocephalini are a tribe within the leaf beetle subfamily Cryptocephalinae. As the other Cryptocephalinae, they belong to the group of case-bearing leaf beetles known as Camptosomata. Some species are myrmecophilous.

== Selected genera ==
- Aporocera Saunders, 1842
- Bassareus Haldeman, 1849
- Cadmus Erichson, 1842
- Coenobius Suffrian, 1857
- Cryptocephalus Chapuis, 1875
- Diachus J.L.LeConte, 1880
- Ditropidus Erichson, 1842
- Lexiphanes Gistel, 1836
- Loxopleurus Suffrian, 1859
- Pycnophthalma Maulik, 1929
- Triachus J.L.LeConte, 1880
