= Coenobius geniostomae =

Scientific classification
- Kingdom: Animalia
- Phylum: Arthropoda
- Clade: Pancrustacea
- Class: Insecta
- Order: Coleoptera
- Suborder: Polyphaga
- Infraorder: Cucujiformia
- Family: Chrysomelidae
- Genus: Coenobius
- Species: C. geniostomae

Binomial name
- Coenobius geniostomae Gressitt, 1957

Species of beetle

Coenobius geniostomae is a species of beetle of the family Chrysomelidae. It is found in Fiji.

== Description ==
Adults reach a length of about 2.5 mm. They are testaceous, largely translucent or transparent and somewhat ochraceous on the center of the pronotum. The elytra are blackish on the base and suture and pitchy on the outer margin.

== Life history ==
The recorded host plant for this species is Geniostoma vitiense.
