= Pycnophthalma leveri =

Scientific classification
- Kingdom: Animalia
- Phylum: Arthropoda
- Clade: Pancrustacea
- Class: Insecta
- Order: Coleoptera
- Suborder: Polyphaga
- Infraorder: Cucujiformia
- Family: Chrysomelidae
- Genus: Pycnophthalma
- Species: P. leveri

Binomial name
- Pycnophthalma leveri Bryant, 1942

Species of beetle

Pycnophthalma leveri is a species of beetle of the family Chrysomelidae. It is found in Fiji.

== Description ==
Adults reach a length of about 2 mm. They have a bronzy dorsum and the pronotum is clothed with fine hairs. The elytra have small greyish silvery scales.

== Life history ==
No host plant has been documented for this species.
