= Loxopleurus =

Scientific classification
- Kingdom: Animalia
- Phylum: Arthropoda
- Clade: Pancrustacea
- Class: Insecta
- Order: Coleoptera
- Suborder: Polyphaga
- Infraorder: Cucujiformia
- Family: Chrysomelidae
- Subfamily: Cryptocephalinae
- Tribe: Cryptocephalini
- Genus: Loxopleurus; Suffrian, 1859

Genus of leaf beetles

Loxopleurus is a genus of beetles belonging to the family Chrysomelidae.

== Selected species ==
- Loxopleurus costipennis Bryant, 1945
- Loxopleurus leveri Bryant, 1943
- Loxopleurus rotumanus Bryant, 1957
- Loxopleurus ruficollis Bryant, 1957
- Loxopleurus vitiensis Bryant, 1943
