= Ditropidus punctulum =

Scientific classification
- Kingdom: Animalia
- Phylum: Arthropoda
- Clade: Pancrustacea
- Class: Insecta
- Order: Coleoptera
- Suborder: Polyphaga
- Infraorder: Cucujiformia
- Family: Chrysomelidae
- Genus: Ditropidus
- Species: D. punctulum

Binomial name
- Ditropidus punctulum Chapuis, 1876

Species of beetle

Ditropidus punctulum is a species of beetle of the family Chrysomelidae. It is found in Australia (South Australia, New South Wales). Although it was also reported from Fiji, this was later determined to be based on a misidentification.

== Description ==
Adults reach a length of about 1.5 mm. They are dark reddish pitchy with testaceous legs. The antennae are also testaceous, but with the apex slightly dusky.

== Life history ==
No host plant has been documented for this species.
