= Pycnophthalma apicale =

Scientific classification
- Kingdom: Animalia
- Phylum: Arthropoda
- Clade: Pancrustacea
- Class: Insecta
- Order: Coleoptera
- Suborder: Polyphaga
- Infraorder: Cucujiformia
- Family: Chrysomelidae
- Genus: Pycnophthalma
- Species: P. apicale

Binomial name
- Pycnophthalma apicale Bryant, 1957

Species of beetle

Pycnophthalma apicale is a species of beetle of the family Chrysomelidae. It is found in Fiji.

== Description ==
Adults reach a length of about 2-2.5 mm. They are metallic bronze-green above, with the apex of the elytra flavous, clothed with short golden hairs. These hairs are white and silky on the side margin and the apical half of the suture on the elytra.

== Life history ==
No host plant has been documented for this species.
