= Triachus postremus =

Scientific classification
- Kingdom: Animalia
- Phylum: Arthropoda
- Clade: Pancrustacea
- Class: Insecta
- Order: Coleoptera
- Suborder: Polyphaga
- Infraorder: Cucujiformia
- Family: Chrysomelidae
- Genus: Triachus
- Species: T. postremus

Binomial name
- Triachus postremus J. L. LeConte, 1880

Species of beetle

Triachus postremus is a species of case-bearing leaf beetle in the family Chrysomelidae. It is found in North America.
