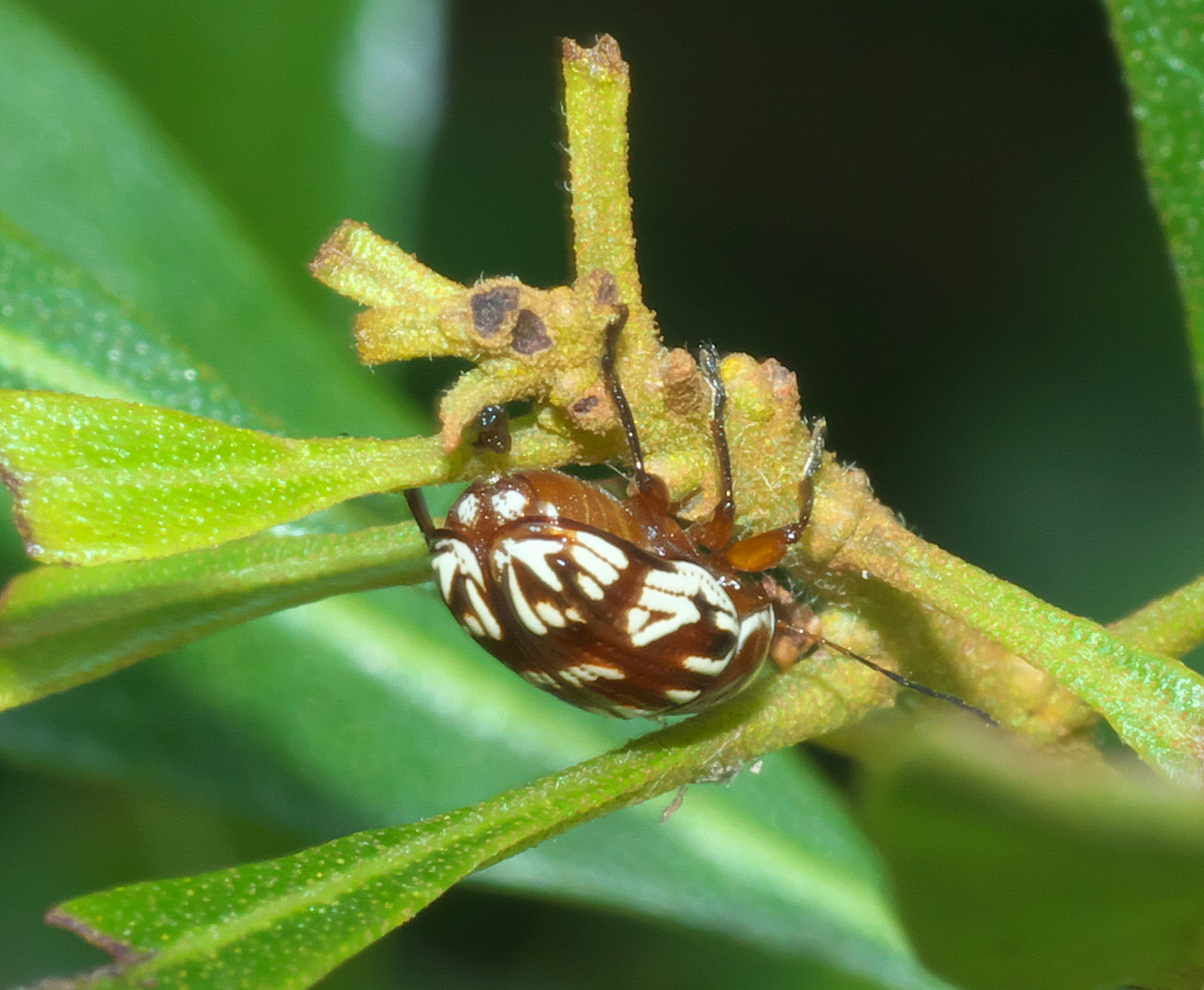
- Bassareus brunnipes

Scientific classification
- Kingdom: Animalia
- Phylum: Arthropoda
- Clade: Pancrustacea
- Class: Insecta
- Order: Coleoptera
- Suborder: Polyphaga
- Infraorder: Cucujiformia
- Family: Chrysomelidae
- Tribe: Cryptocephalini
- Genus: Bassareus; Haldeman, 1849

= Bassareus (beetle) =

Genus of leaf beetles

Bassareus is a genus of case-bearing leaf beetles in the family Chrysomelidae. There are about eight described species in Bassareus.

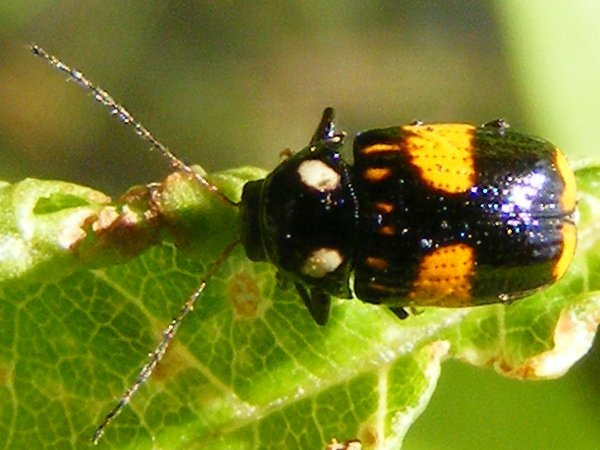
Bassareus mammifer

== Species ==
- Bassareus areolatus (Suffrian, 1852)
- Bassareus brunnipes (Olivier, 1791)
- Bassareus clathratus (F. E. Melsheimer, 1847)
- Bassareus croceipennis J. L. LeConte, 1880
- Bassareus detritus (Olivier, 1808)
- Bassareus formosus (F. E. Melsheimer, 1847)
- Bassareus lituratus (Fabricius, 1801)
- Bassareus mammifer (Newman, 1840)
