= Coenobius =

Scientific classification
- Kingdom: Animalia
- Phylum: Arthropoda
- Clade: Pancrustacea
- Class: Insecta
- Order: Coleoptera
- Suborder: Polyphaga
- Infraorder: Cucujiformia
- Family: Chrysomelidae
- Subfamily: Cryptocephalinae
- Tribe: Cryptocephalini
- Genus: Coenobius; Suffrian, 1857

Genus of leaf beetles

Coenobius is a genus of beetles belonging to the family Chrysomelidae.

== Species ==
- Coenobius apicefulvus
- Coenobius azureus
- Coenobius babai
- Coenobius badius
- Coenobius baronii
- Coenobius bicolor
- Coenobius bipustulatus
- Coenobius birmanicus
- Coenobius brevioculatus
- Coenobius caeruleipennis
- Coenobius castaneus
- Coenobius choanus
- Coenobius chujoi
- Coenobius circumductus
- Coenobius collaris
- Coenobius cuneoscutis
- Coenobius curtipennis
- Coenobius cyaneus
- Coenobius cyclops
- Coenobius discoidalis
- Coenobius discoideus
- Coenobius distantis
- Coenobius endoi
- Coenobius fenestratus
- Coenobius flavescens
- Coenobius flavicornis
- Coenobius formosus
- Coenobius fulvipes
- Coenobius fulvus
- Coenobius geniostomae
- Coenobius imatadei
- Coenobius inconstans
- Coenobius indicus
- Coenobius insulicola
- Coenobius kaohsiungensis
- Coenobius lankanus
- Coenobius longicornis
- Coenobius luteomaculatus
- Coenobius maculipennis
- Coenobius marginipennis
- Coenobius matangi
- Coenobius medvedevi
- Coenobius melanoxanthus
- Coenobius niger
- Coenobius nigricollis
- Coenobius nigrocastaneus
- Coenobius obscuripennis
- Coenobius parvoniger
- Coenobius piceipes
- Coenobius piceus
- Coenobius producticollis
- Coenobius puncticollis
- Coenobius rubrithorax
- Coenobius ruficollis
- Coenobius sabahensis
- Coenobius sarawacensis
- Coenobius schawalleri
- Coenobius sikkimensis
- Coenobius spissus
- Coenobius stoneri
- Coenobius sulcicollis
- Coenobius taiwanus
- Coenobius variegatus
- Coenobius weiseanus
- Coenobius weisei
- Coenobius yosionis
- Coenobius zimmermani
