= Cadmus colossus =

Scientific classification
- Kingdom: Animalia
- Phylum: Arthropoda
- Clade: Pancrustacea
- Class: Insecta
- Order: Coleoptera
- Suborder: Polyphaga
- Infraorder: Cucujiformia
- Family: Chrysomelidae
- Genus: Cadmus
- Subgenus: Brachycaulus
- Species: C. colossus

Binomial name
- Cadmus colossus (Chapuis, 1875)

Species of beetle

Cadmus colossus, or Cadmus (Brachycaulus) colossus, is a species of beetle in the subfamily Cryptocephalinae, or case-bearing leaf beetles, and the subgenus Brachycaulus. It was first described by Félicien Chapuis in 1875, from a male specimen collected at Port Denison. It is native to Australia, being found in New South Wales and Queensland.

The taxonomic reasoning for the subgeneric arrangement (accepted by the Australian Faunal Directory) is given in Mathews and Reid (2002).
