= Pycnophthalma cuprea =

Scientific classification
- Kingdom: Animalia
- Phylum: Arthropoda
- Clade: Pancrustacea
- Class: Insecta
- Order: Coleoptera
- Suborder: Polyphaga
- Infraorder: Cucujiformia
- Family: Chrysomelidae
- Genus: Pycnophthalma
- Species: P. cuprea

Binomial name
- Pycnophthalma cuprea Bryant, 1942

Species of beetle

Pycnophthalma cuprea is a species of beetle of the family Chrysomelidae. It is found in Fiji.

== Description ==
Adults reach a length of about 1.8-2 mm. They are dark bronzy pitchy, while the antennae are testaceous basally and brownish distally.

== Life history ==
No host plant has been documented for this species.
