= Coenobius zimmermani =

Scientific classification
- Kingdom: Animalia
- Phylum: Arthropoda
- Clade: Pancrustacea
- Class: Insecta
- Order: Coleoptera
- Suborder: Polyphaga
- Infraorder: Cucujiformia
- Family: Chrysomelidae
- Genus: Coenobius
- Species: C. zimmermani

Binomial name
- Coenobius zimmermani Gressitt, 1957

Species of beetle

Coenobius zimmermani is a species of beetle of the family Chrysomelidae. It is found in Fiji.

== Description ==
Adults reach a length of about 1.2-2.4 mm. They are dark chestnut brown to pitchy, with the head, legs and last abdominal sternite testaceous. The antennae are testaceous basally, but pitchy on the last six segments.

== Life history ==
No host plant has been documented for this species.
