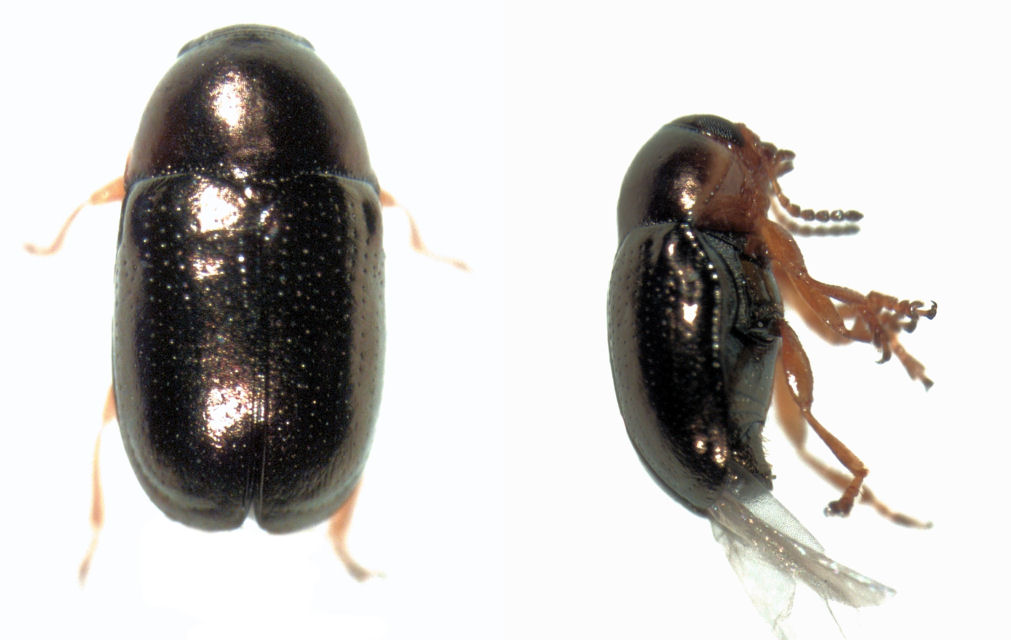

Scientific classification
- Kingdom: Animalia
- Phylum: Arthropoda
- Clade: Pancrustacea
- Class: Insecta
- Order: Coleoptera
- Suborder: Polyphaga
- Infraorder: Cucujiformia
- Family: Chrysomelidae
- Genus: Diachus
- Species: D. auratus

Binomial name
- Diachus auratus (Fabricius, 1801)

= Diachus auratus =

Species of beetle

Diachus auratus, the bronze leaf beetle, is a species of case-bearing leaf beetle in the family Chrysomelidae. It is found in Australia, the Caribbean, Central America, North America, Oceania, South America, and Southern Asia.
