= Ditropidus =

Scientific classification
- Kingdom: Animalia
- Phylum: Arthropoda
- Clade: Pancrustacea
- Class: Insecta
- Order: Coleoptera
- Suborder: Polyphaga
- Infraorder: Cucujiformia
- Family: Chrysomelidae
- Subfamily: Cryptocephalinae
- Tribe: Cryptocephalini
- Genus: Ditropidus; Suffrian, 1857

Synonyms
- Pleomorpha Saunders, 1847

Genus of leaf beetles

Ditropidus is a genus of beetles belonging to the family Chrysomelidae.

== Species ==
- Ditropidus abdominalis
- Ditropidus aciculatus
- Ditropidus aeneipennis
- Ditropidus albertsi
- Ditropidus albiceps
- Ditropidus albohirsutus
- Ditropidus alphabeticus
- Ditropidus amabilis
- Ditropidus angustifrons
- Ditropidus antennarius
- Ditropidus anthracinus
- Ditropidus apiciflavus
- Ditropidus apicipennis
- Ditropidus armatus
- Ditropidus ater
- Ditropidus aurichalceus
- Ditropidus basiceps
- Ditropidus basiventris
- Ditropidus bicolor
- Ditropidus bimaculatus
- Ditropidus biplagiatus
- Ditropidus boops
- Ditropidus brachysomus
- Ditropidus brevicollis
- Ditropidus brevis
- Ditropidus brunneipennis
- Ditropidus caeruleipennis
- Ditropidus caeruleus
- Ditropidus carbonarius
- Ditropidus carinaticeps
- Ditropidus cavifrons
- Ditropidus chapuisi
- Ditropidus clypealis
- Ditropidus clypeatus
- Ditropidus coelestis
- Ditropidus coerulescens
- Ditropidus cognatus
- Ditropidus comans
- Ditropidus compactus
- Ditropidus comptus
- Ditropidus concolor
- Ditropidus congenitus
- Ditropidus convexiusculus
- Ditropidus coriaceus
- Ditropidus cornutus
- Ditropidus corrugatus
- Ditropidus costatus
- Ditropidus costipennis
- Ditropidus crassipes
- Ditropidus cribriceps
- Ditropidus cribricollis
- Ditropidus cribripennis
- Ditropidus cuneatus
- Ditropidus cupreus
- Ditropidus cupricollis
- Ditropidus davisii
- Ditropidus dimidiatus
- Ditropidus discicollis
- Ditropidus distinguendus
- Ditropidus doriae
- Ditropidus duboulai
- Ditropidus elegantulus
- Ditropidus elutus
- Ditropidus epistomalis
- Ditropidus evelynensis
- Ditropidus fascialis
- Ditropidus fasciatus
- Ditropidus flavipennis
- Ditropidus flavipes
- Ditropidus flavoapicalis
- Ditropidus flavolateralis
- Ditropidus foveiventris
- Ditropidus frontalis
- Ditropidus fugitivus
- Ditropidus fulgidus
- Ditropidus fulvicornis
- Ditropidus fulvus
- Ditropidus gagates
- Ditropidus gagatinus
- Ditropidus geminatus
- Ditropidus geniculatus
- Ditropidus gibbicollis
- Ditropidus gibbulus
- Ditropidus glaber
- Ditropidus globulus
- Ditropidus globus
- Ditropidus glossatus
- Ditropidus godeffroyi
- Ditropidus gymnopterus
- Ditropidus hirticollis
- Ditropidus histeroides
- Ditropidus holoporphyrus
- Ditropidus ignitus
- Ditropidus imitator
- Ditropidus imperialis
- Ditropidus impuncticollis
- Ditropidus inconspicuus
- Ditropidus indistinctus
- Ditropidus insignis
- Ditropidus insularis
- Ditropidus intonsus
- Ditropidus jansoni
- Ditropidus labiatus
- Ditropidus lacordairei
- Ditropidus laetus
- Ditropidus laevicollis
- Ditropidus laeviusculus
- Ditropidus laminatus
- Ditropidus latericollis
- Ditropidus lateritius
- Ditropidus lateroapicalis
- Ditropidus laticollis
- Ditropidus latifrons
- Ditropidus lentulus
- Ditropidus lepidus
- Ditropidus lobicollis
- Ditropidus longipes
- Ditropidus longus
- Ditropidus macrocephalus
- Ditropidus macrops
- Ditropidus maculifrons
- Ditropidus majorinus
- Ditropidus mandibularis
- Ditropidus marginipennis
- Ditropidus maxillosus
- Ditropidus melasomus
- Ditropidus metallicus
- Ditropidus micans
- Ditropidus michaelseni
- Ditropidus minutus
- Ditropidus mirus
- Ditropidus modestus
- Ditropidus modicus
- Ditropidus nanus
- Ditropidus nigribasis
- Ditropidus nigricollis
- Ditropidus nigripennis
- Ditropidus nigriventris
- Ditropidus nigrovarius
- Ditropidus nitiduloides
- Ditropidus nobilis
- Ditropidus notatus
- Ditropidus oblongipennis
- Ditropidus obscuripennis
- Ditropidus obsidianus
- Ditropidus obtusus
- Ditropidus ochropus
- Ditropidus odewahnii
- Ditropidus opaciceps
- Ditropidus ophthalmicus
- Ditropidus opulentus
- Ditropidus ornatus
- Ditropidus ovatulus
- Ditropidus pallidipennis
- Ditropidus pallipes
- Ditropidus palmerstoni
- Ditropidus parviceps
- Ditropidus pascoei
- Ditropidus pastus
- Ditropidus phalacroides
- Ditropidus pictus
- Ditropidus puberlus
- Ditropidus pubescens
- Ditropidus pubicollis
- Ditropidus pulchellus
- Ditropidus pulicosus
- Ditropidus punctatostriatus
- Ditropidus puncticollis
- Ditropidus punctipennis
- Ditropidus punctivarius
- Ditropidus punctulum
- Ditropidus pusillus
- Ditropidus pygidialis
- Ditropidus pyriformis
- Ditropidus quadratipennis
- Ditropidus rivularis
- Ditropidus rotundatus
- Ditropidus rotundiformis
- Ditropidus rufescens
- Ditropidus ruficollis
- Ditropidus rufimanus
- Ditropidus rufipes
- Ditropidus rufocupreus
- Ditropidus saprinoides
- Ditropidus schmelzi
- Ditropidus scitulus
- Ditropidus sculpturatus
- Ditropidus scutellaris
- Ditropidus semicircularis
- Ditropidus semicrudus
- Ditropidus seminulum
- Ditropidus serenus
- Ditropidus similis
- Ditropidus sobrinus
- Ditropidus solitus
- Ditropidus splendidus
- Ditropidus stramipennis
- Ditropidus striatipennis
- Ditropidus striatopunctatus
- Ditropidus striatus
- Ditropidus strigiceps
- Ditropidus strigicollis
- Ditropidus strigosus
- Ditropidus subaeneus
- Ditropidus subarmatus
- Ditropidus subcylindricus
- Ditropidus submetallescens
- Ditropidus subsimilis
- Ditropidus subsuturalis
- Ditropidus suffriani
- Ditropidus tarsalis
- Ditropidus tarsatus
- Ditropidus tenuifrons
- Ditropidus tibialis
- Ditropidus trabeatus
- Ditropidus tranguillus
- Ditropidus triangulifer
- Ditropidus tropicus
- Ditropidus vagans
- Ditropidus variiceps
- Ditropidus variicollis
- Ditropidus ventralis
- Ditropidus venustus
- Ditropidus verticalis
- Ditropidus vicarius
- Ditropidus vigilans
- Ditropidus viridiaeneus
- Ditropidus viridimicans
- Ditropidus viriditinctus
- Ditropidus vulpinus
- Ditropidus whitei
- Ditropidus xanthostomus
- Ditropidus xanthurus
