= Lexiphanes saponatus =

Scientific classification
- Kingdom: Animalia
- Phylum: Arthropoda
- Clade: Pancrustacea
- Class: Insecta
- Order: Coleoptera
- Suborder: Polyphaga
- Infraorder: Cucujiformia
- Family: Chrysomelidae
- Genus: Lexiphanes
- Species: L. saponatus

Binomial name
- Lexiphanes saponatus (Fabricius, 1801)

Species of beetle

Lexiphanes saponatus is a species of case-bearing leaf beetle in the family Chrysomelidae. It is found in North America.
