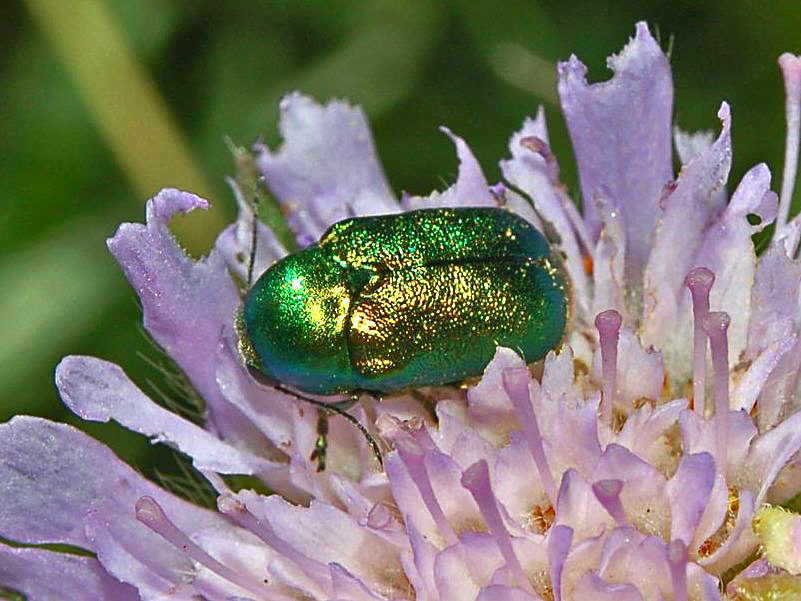
- Cryptocephalus sericeus zambanellus. Upperside
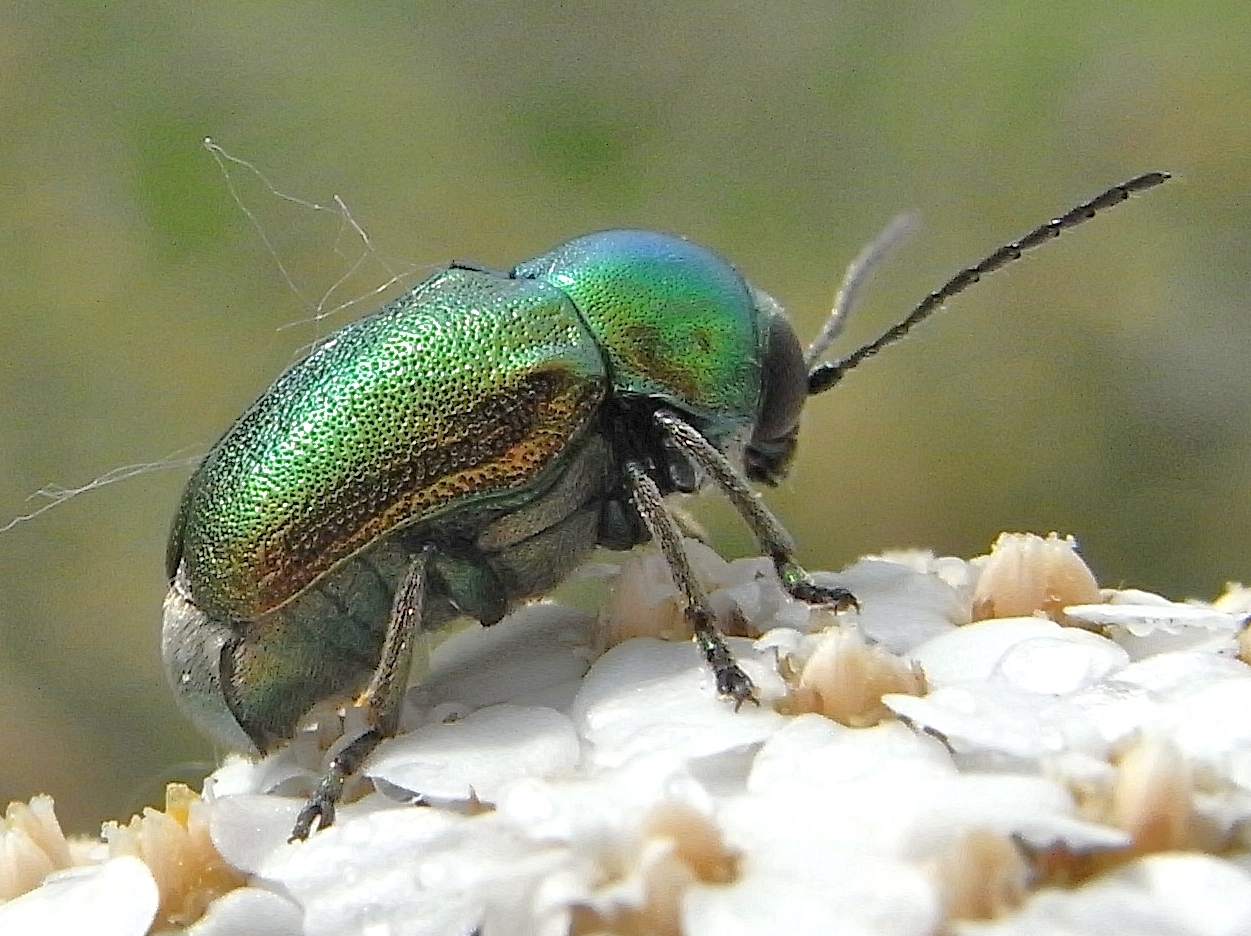
- Cryptocephalus sericeus. Lateral view

Scientific classification
- Kingdom: Animalia
- Phylum: Arthropoda
- Class: Insecta
- Order: Coleoptera
- Suborder: Polyphaga
- Infraorder: Cucujiformia
- Family: Chrysomelidae
- Genus: Cryptocephalus
- Species: C. sericeus

Binomial name
- Cryptocephalus sericeus (Linnaeus, 1758)

Synonyms
- Chrysomela sericea Linnaeus, 1758

= Cryptocephalus sericeus =

Species of beetle

Cryptocephalus sericeus is a species of beetle of the family Chrysomelidae, subfamily Cryptocephalinae.

== Subspecies ==
Subspecies include:

- Cryptocephalus sericeus sericeus (Linnaeus, 1758)
- Cryptocephalus sericeus zambanellus (Marseul, 1875) (Bosnia, Croatia, Slovenia, Herzegovina, Italy)
- Cryptocephalus sericeus intrusus (Weisw, 1882) (Croatia, Italy, Slovenia)

== Distribution ==
This species can be found in most of Europe, in the eastern Palearctic realm from Siberia east to northwestern China, and in the Near East. It is not present in the British Isles.

== Habitat ==
These beetles inhabit lawns and meadows, especially with yellow flowers of Apiaceae species.

== Description ==
Cryptocephalus sericeus can reach a length of about 6–7 millimetres (0.24–0.28 in). The body of these little beetles is squat, cylindrical and almost oval. Elytra are irregularly punctured, not arranged in longitudinal rows. They do not completely cover the last part of the abdomen. Pronotum and elytra are golden green in males, while females show a metallic bronze color, with green-blue, orange or yellow reflections. The antennas are thread-shaped and relatively long. The head, the legs, and antennae are dark colored.

This species is rather similar to Cryptocephalus aureolus, Cryptocephalus praticola, Cryptocephalus solivagus, Cryptocephalus therondi and Cryptocephalus hypochoeridis.

== Biolib ==
Adults can be found from April to July. The feed on pollen, especially on the yellow flowers of Apiaceae species. Larvae feed on leaves of the host plants. They live in a housing that consists of their own droppings. The pupation takes place in the soil.

== Gallery ==
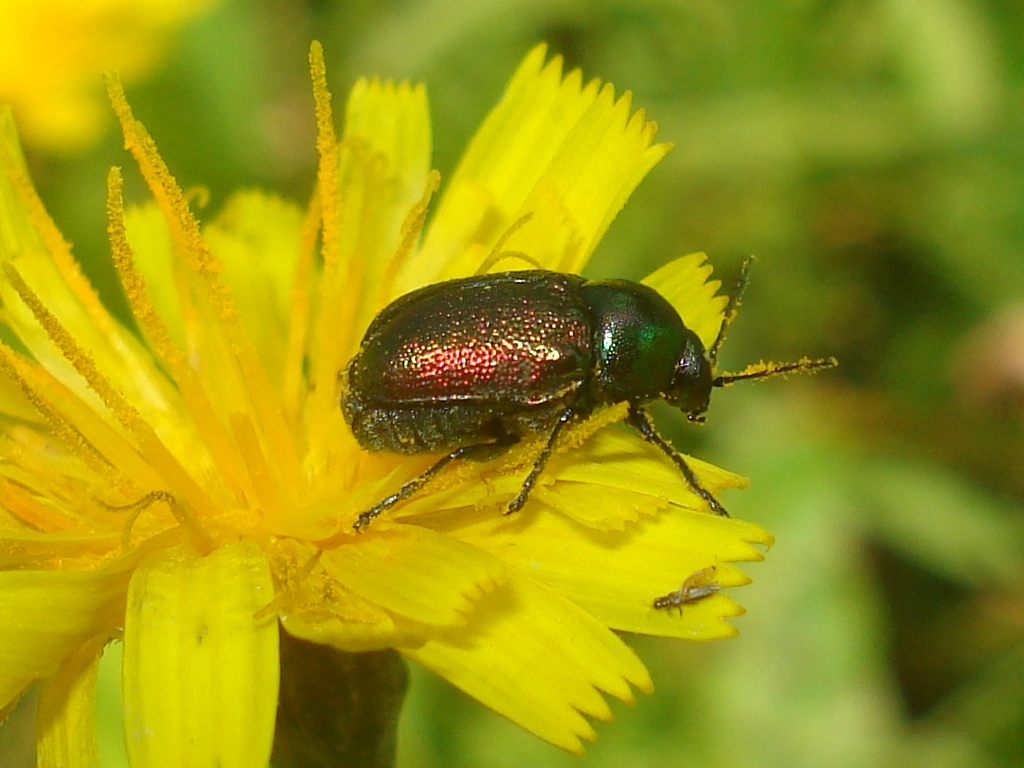
Cryptocephalus sericeus sericeus

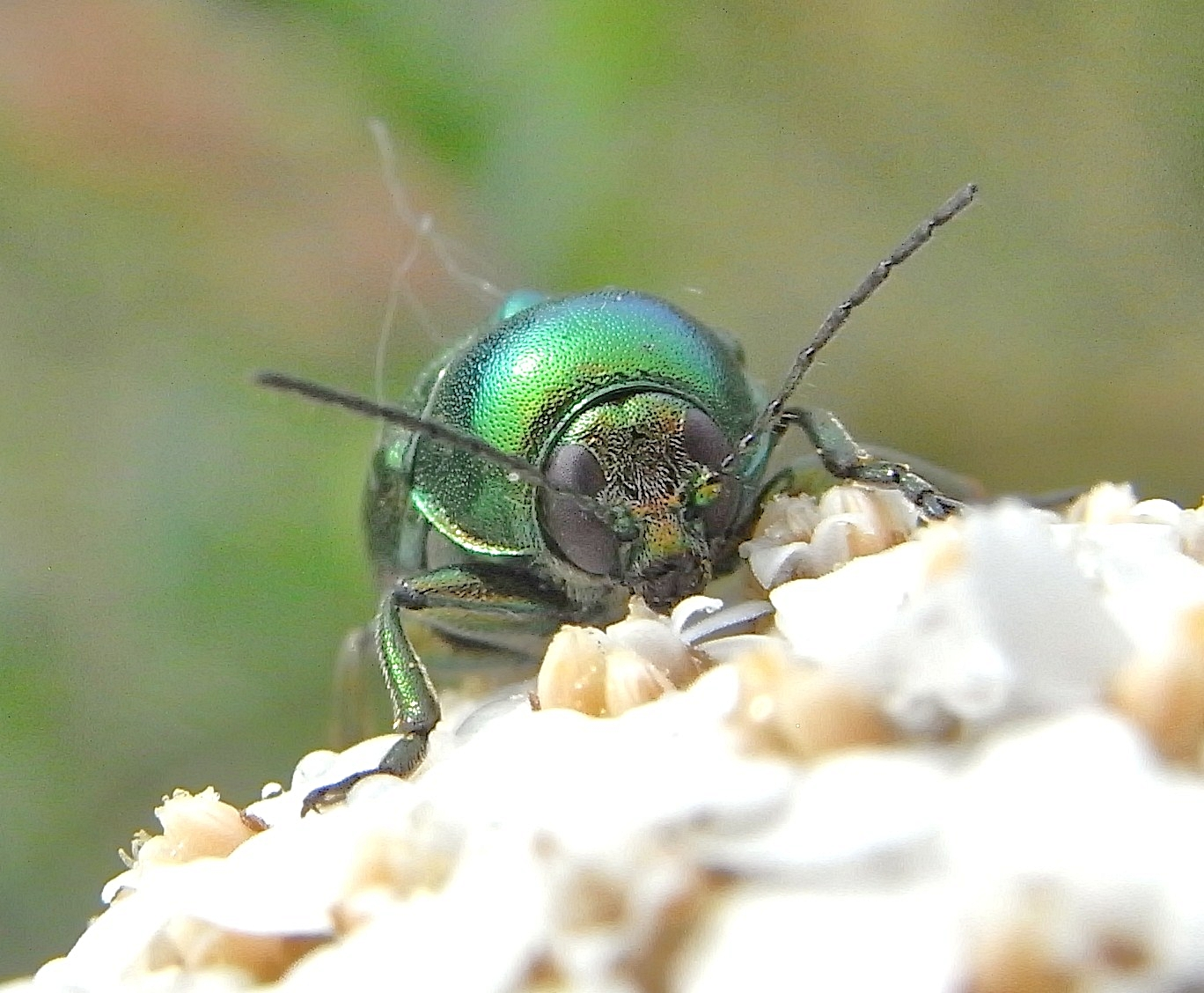
Front view

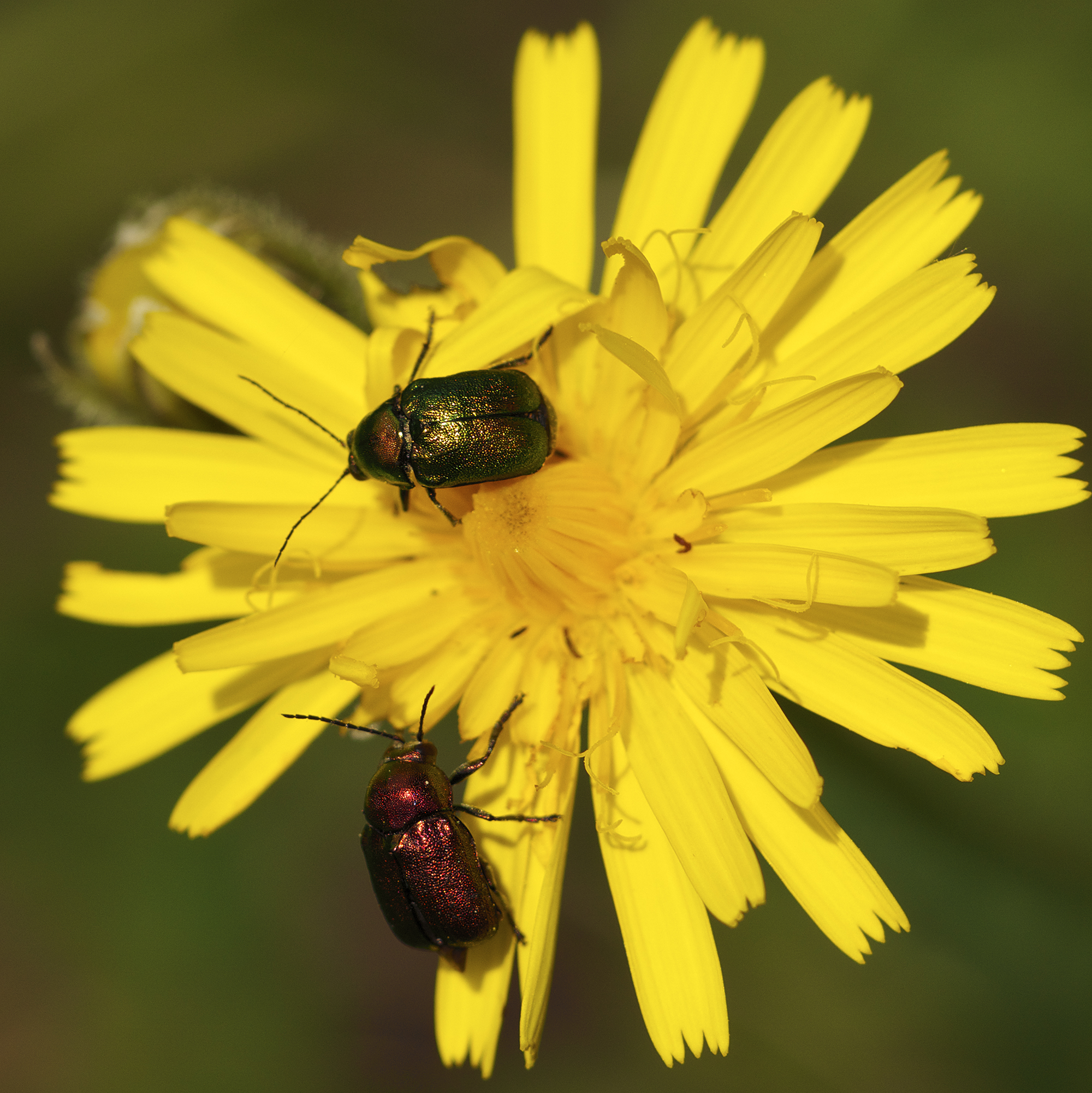
Cryptocephalus sericeus of varying colors
