= Triachus =

Scientific classification
- Kingdom: Animalia
- Phylum: Arthropoda
- Clade: Pancrustacea
- Class: Insecta
- Order: Coleoptera
- Suborder: Polyphaga
- Infraorder: Cucujiformia
- Family: Chrysomelidae
- Subfamily: Cryptocephalinae
- Tribe: Cryptocephalini
- Subtribe: Cryptocephalina
- Genus: Triachus; J. L. LeConte, 1880

Genus of beetles

Triachus is a genus of case-bearing leaf beetles in the family Chrysomelidae. There are about five described species in Triachus.

== Species ==
These five species belong to the genus Triachus:

- Triachus atomus (Suffrian, 1852)
- Triachus cerinus J. L. LeConte, 1880
- Triachus peninsularis Schaeffer
- Triachus postremus J. L. LeConte, 1880
- Triachus vacuus J. L. LeConte, 1880
