= Bassareus clathratus =

Scientific classification
- Kingdom: Animalia
- Phylum: Arthropoda
- Clade: Pancrustacea
- Class: Insecta
- Order: Coleoptera
- Suborder: Polyphaga
- Infraorder: Cucujiformia
- Family: Chrysomelidae
- Genus: Bassareus
- Species: B. clathratus

Binomial name
- Bassareus clathratus (F. E. Melsheimer, 1847)

Species of beetle

Bassareus clathratus is a species of case-bearing leaf beetle in the family Chrysomelidae. It is found in North America.
