= Lexiphanes =

Scientific classification
- Kingdom: Animalia
- Phylum: Arthropoda
- Clade: Pancrustacea
- Class: Insecta
- Order: Coleoptera
- Suborder: Polyphaga
- Infraorder: Cucujiformia
- Family: Chrysomelidae
- Tribe: Cryptocephalini
- Genus: Lexiphanes; Gistel, 1836

Genus of beetles

Lexiphanes is a genus of case-bearing leaf beetles in the family Chrysomelidae. There are about 17 described species in Lexiphanes.

== Species ==
These 17 species belong to the genus Lexiphanes:

- Lexiphanes abdomialis Jacoby
- Lexiphanes affinis (Haldeman, 1849)
- Lexiphanes atrofasciatus Jacoby
- Lexiphanes decolorans Suffrian, 1863
- Lexiphanes flavitarsis Jacoby
- Lexiphanes guerini (Perbosc, 1839)
- Lexiphanes juvencus Olivier, 1808
- Lexiphanes mexicanus (Jacoby, 1907)
- Lexiphanes nigripennis Jacoby
- Lexiphanes saponatus (Fabricius, 1801)
- Lexiphanes scrobiculatus Suffrian, 1863
- Lexiphanes seminulum (Suffrian, 1858)
- Lexiphanes seriepunctatus Suffrian, 1863
- Lexiphanes simplex (Jacoby, 1889)
- Lexiphanes stricticollis Suffrian, 1863
- Lexiphanes teapensis (Jacoby, 1889)
- Lexiphanes umbrosus Suffrian, 1863
