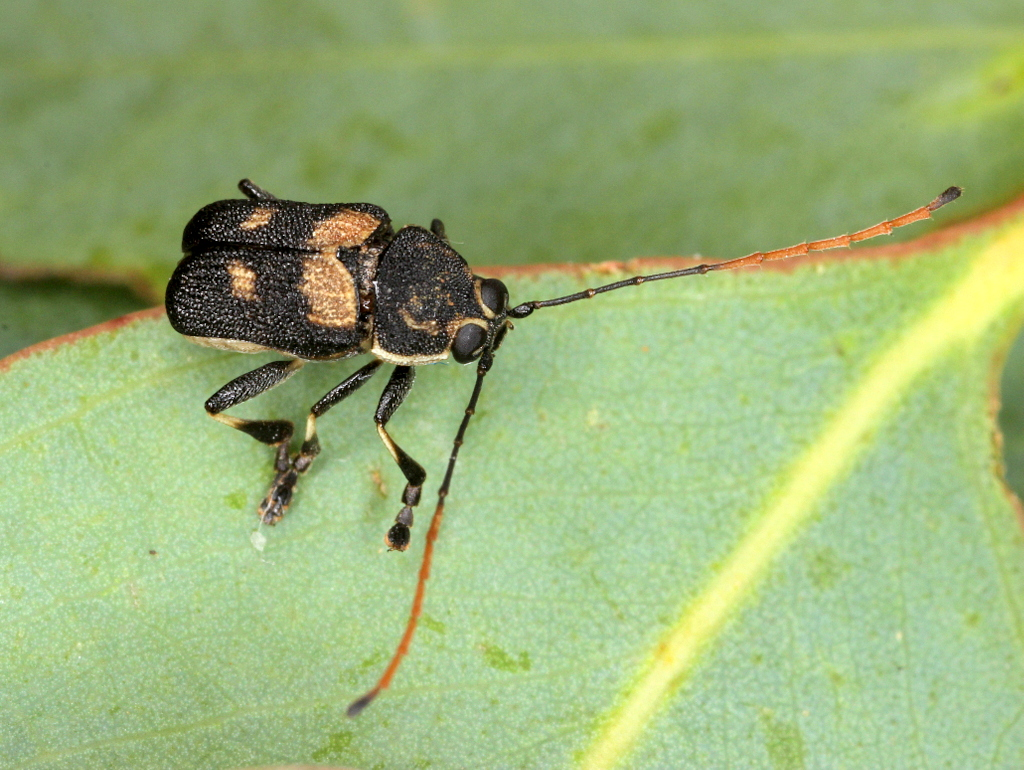
- Aporocera sp.

Scientific classification
- Kingdom: Animalia
- Phylum: Arthropoda
- Clade: Pancrustacea
- Class: Insecta
- Order: Coleoptera
- Suborder: Polyphaga
- Infraorder: Cucujiformia
- Family: Chrysomelidae
- Subfamily: Cryptocephalinae
- Tribe: Cryptocephalini
- Genus: Aporocera; Saunders, 1842

Species
- Aporocera absonus Aporocera acenteta Aporocera aciculata Aporocera aegra Aporocera aeneola Aporocera aerea Aporocera consors

= Aporocera =

Genus of beetles

Aporocera is a genus of leaf beetles commonly called case bearing leaf beetles in the subfamily Cryptocephalinae. Aporocera are well represented in all states of Australia and consist of 148 species in two subspecies.

The adults are roughly cylindrical in shape and have long antennae, more-so for males.

They are common on Eucalyptus including Eucalyptus globulus but are usually not a problem.

Eggs are about 1mm and are laid inside faecal pellets. When the larvae hatch, they work a hole in one end and remain in the faecal case as they feed on leaf litter on the forest floor. When they pupate, they seal their case again.

== Gallery ==
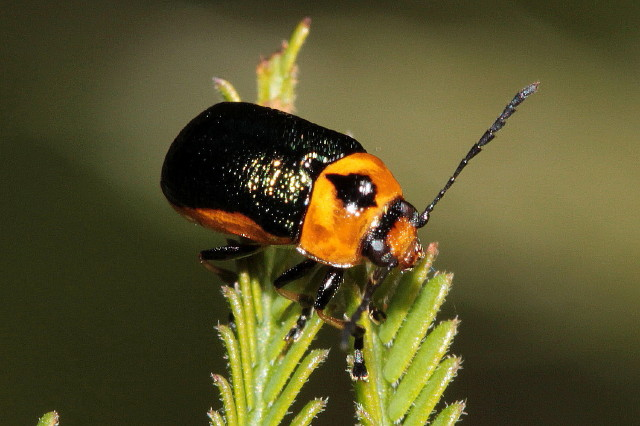
Aporocera consors

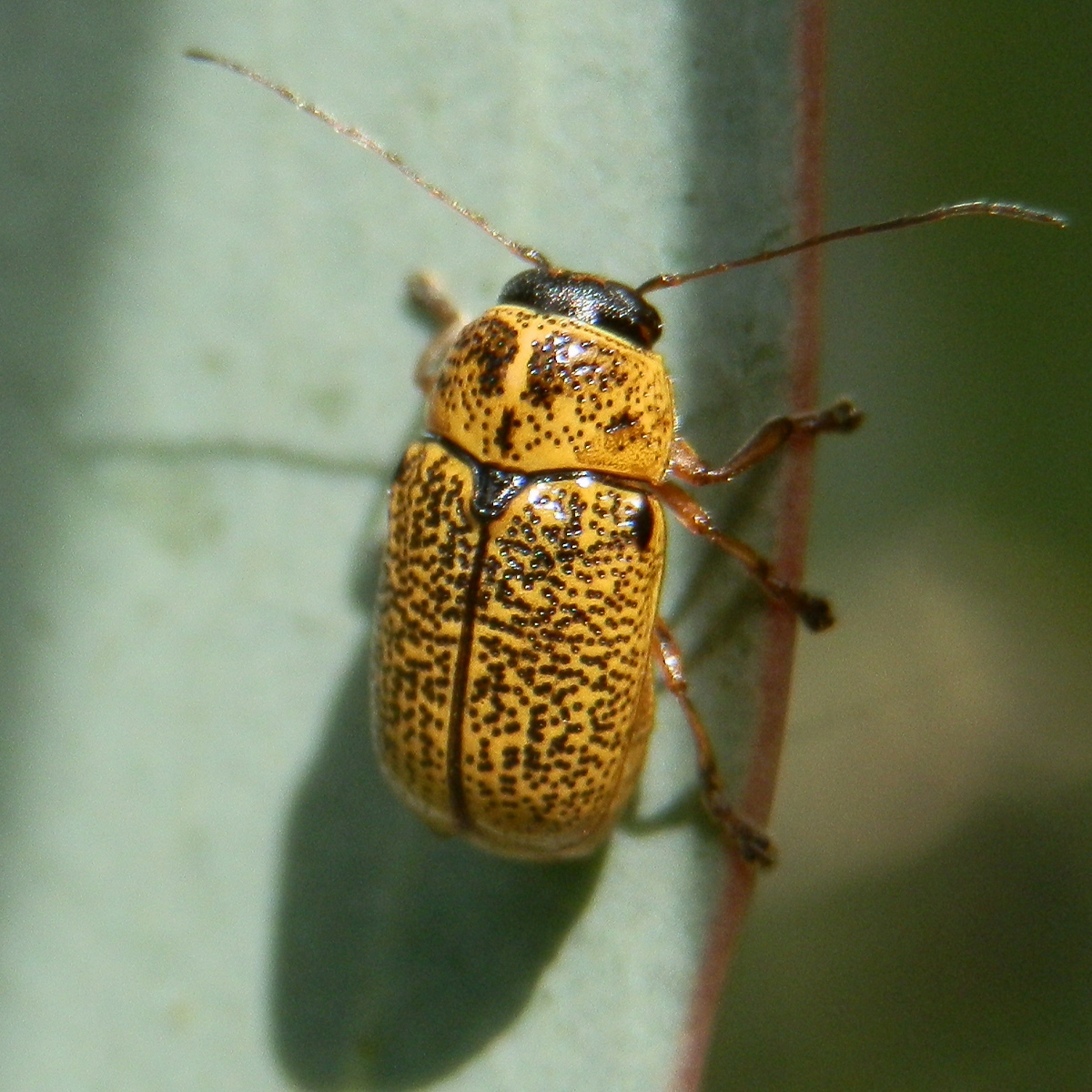
Aporocera melanocephala

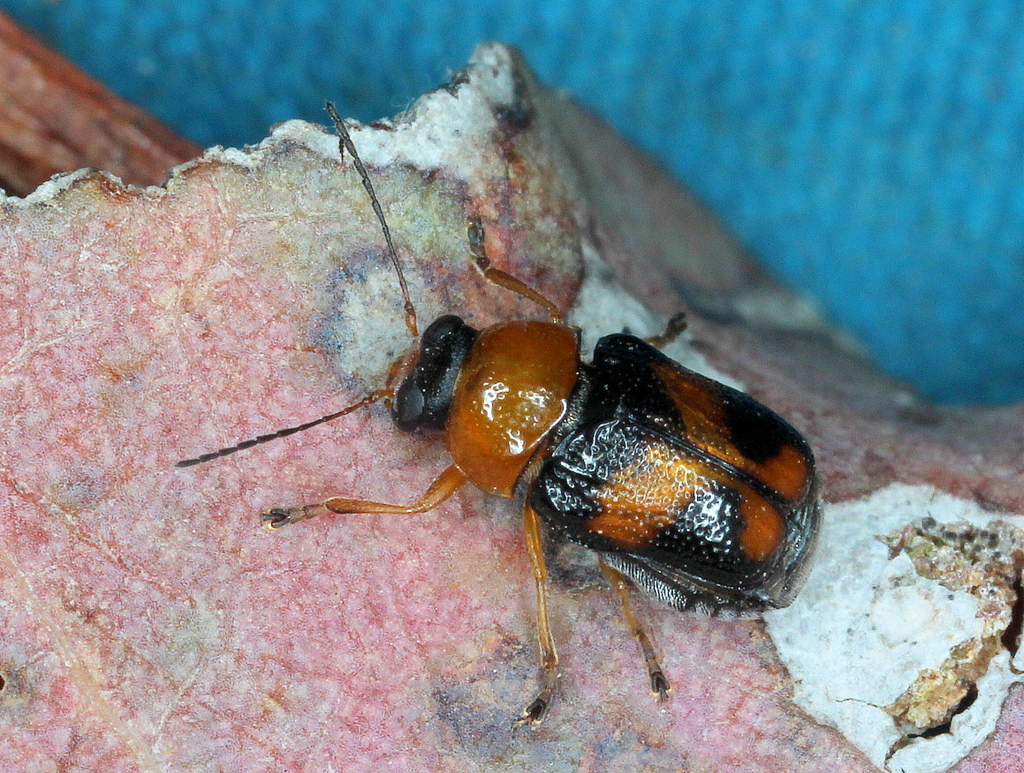
Aporocera sp.

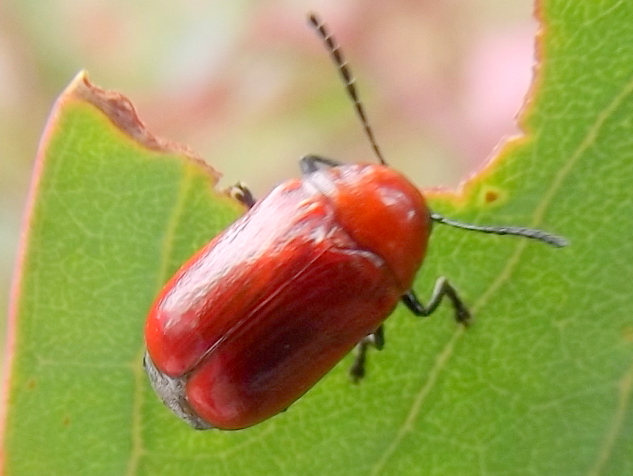
Aporocera (Aporocera) haematodes
