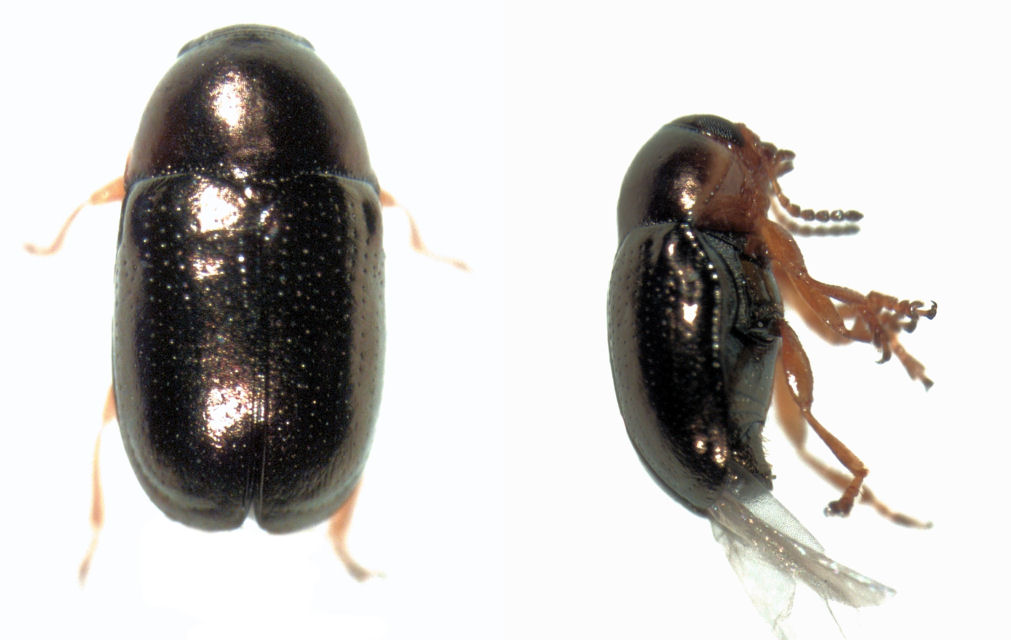
- Diachus auratus

Scientific classification
- Kingdom: Animalia
- Phylum: Arthropoda
- Clade: Pancrustacea
- Class: Insecta
- Order: Coleoptera
- Suborder: Polyphaga
- Infraorder: Cucujiformia
- Family: Chrysomelidae
- Subfamily: Cryptocephalinae
- Tribe: Cryptocephalini
- Subtribe: Cryptocephalina
- Genus: Diachus; J. L. LeConte, 1880

= Diachus =

Genus of beetles

Diachus is a genus of case-bearing leaf beetles in the family Chrysomelidae. There are about 10 described species in Diachus.

== Species ==
These 10 species belong to the genus Diachus:

- Diachus aeruginosus J. L. LeConte, 1880
- Diachus auratus (Fabricius, 1801) (bronze leaf beetle)
- Diachus catarius (Suffrian, 1852)
- Diachus chlorizans (Suffrian, 1852)
- Diachus erasus J. L. LeConte, 1880
- Diachus levis (Haldeman, 1849)
- Diachus luscus (Suffrian, 1858)
- Diachus pallidicornis (Suffrian, 1867)
- Diachus squalens (Suffrian, 1852)
- Diachus subopacus Schaeffer, 1906
