= Pycnophthalma aureopilosa =

Scientific classification
- Kingdom: Animalia
- Phylum: Arthropoda
- Clade: Pancrustacea
- Class: Insecta
- Order: Coleoptera
- Suborder: Polyphaga
- Infraorder: Cucujiformia
- Family: Chrysomelidae
- Genus: Pycnophthalma
- Species: P. aureopilosa

Binomial name
- Pycnophthalma aureopilosa (Bryant, 1925)

Synonyms
- Coenobius aureopilosus Bryant, 1925

Species of beetle

Pycnophthalma aureopilosa is a species of beetle of the family Chrysomelidae. It is found in Fiji.

== Description ==
Adults reach a length of about 1.9 mm. They are pitchy brown, with dull golden to silvery hairs above.

== Life history ==
No host plant has been documented for this species.
