= Pycnophthalma =

Scientific classification
- Kingdom: Animalia
- Phylum: Arthropoda
- Clade: Pancrustacea
- Class: Insecta
- Order: Coleoptera
- Suborder: Polyphaga
- Infraorder: Cucujiformia
- Family: Chrysomelidae
- Subfamily: Cryptocephalinae
- Tribe: Cryptocephalini
- Genus: Pycnophthalma; Maulik, 1929

Genus of leaf beetles

Pycnophthalma is a genus of beetles belonging to the family Chrysomelidae.

== Selected species ==
- Pycnophthalma cuprea Bryant, 1942
- Pycnophthalma apicale Bryant, 1957
- Pycnophthalma aureopilosa (Bryant, 1925)
- Pycnophthalma leveri Bryant, 1942
- Pycnophthalma tutuilana Maulik, 1929
