= Coenobius marginipennis =

Scientific classification
- Kingdom: Animalia
- Phylum: Arthropoda
- Clade: Pancrustacea
- Class: Insecta
- Order: Coleoptera
- Suborder: Polyphaga
- Infraorder: Cucujiformia
- Family: Chrysomelidae
- Genus: Coenobius
- Species: C. marginipennis

Binomial name
- Coenobius marginipennis Bryant, 1938

Species of beetle

Coenobius marginipennis is a species of beetle of the family Chrysomelidae. It is found in Fiji.

== Description ==
Adults reach a length of about 2.5 mm. They are pale fulvous, the elytra margined with fuscous. Adults of subspecies lauensis differs from subspecies marginipennis in being larger, entirely testaceous (except for antennae) and in having the pronotum less distinctly grooved at the side. Furthermore, the elytral punctures are mostly smaller than the spaces between them.

== Life history ==
The recorded host plants for this species are Glochidion cordatum and Glochidion ramiflorum.

== Subspecies ==
- Coenobius marginipennis marginipennis
- Coenobius marginipennis lauensis Gressitt, 1957
