= Coenobius producticollis =

Scientific classification
- Kingdom: Animalia
- Phylum: Arthropoda
- Clade: Pancrustacea
- Class: Insecta
- Order: Coleoptera
- Suborder: Polyphaga
- Infraorder: Cucujiformia
- Family: Chrysomelidae
- Genus: Coenobius
- Species: C. producticollis

Binomial name
- Coenobius producticollis Gressitt, 1957

Species of beetle

Coenobius producticollis is a species of beetle of the family Chrysomelidae. It is found in Fiji.

== Description ==
Adults reach a length of about 1.65-2 mm. They are reddish brown to dark pitchy, while the base of the antennae, the front of the head and the legs are testaceous.

== Life history ==
No host plant has been documented for this species.
