= Lexiphanes teapensis =

Scientific classification
- Kingdom: Animalia
- Phylum: Arthropoda
- Clade: Pancrustacea
- Class: Insecta
- Order: Coleoptera
- Suborder: Polyphaga
- Infraorder: Cucujiformia
- Family: Chrysomelidae
- Genus: Lexiphanes
- Species: L. teapensis

Binomial name
- Lexiphanes teapensis (Jacoby, 1889)

Species of beetle

Lexiphanes teapensis is a species of case-bearing leaf beetle in the family Chrysomelidae. It is found in Central America and North America.
