= Cadmos =

Cadmos may refer to:

- Cadmus or Kadmos or Cadmos, a Phoenician prince in Greek mythology
- CADMOS (cable system), a submarine telecommunications cable system in the Mediterranean Sea linking Cyprus and Lebanon
