= HMS Cadmus =

Five ships of the Royal Navy have borne the name HMS Cadmus, after Cadmus, a prince in Greek mythology:

- HMS Cadmus (1808) was a 10-gun Cherokee-class brig-sloop launched in 1808. She became a Coastguard watch vessel in 1835, was renamed WV24 in 1863 and was sold in 1864.
- HMS Cadmus was a 12-gun brig launched in 1851 as HMS Despatch. She was renamed HMS Cadmus in 1863 whilst serving as a watch vessel, and was sold in 1901.
- HMS Cadmus (1856) was a wooden screw corvette launched in 1856 and broken up in 1879.
- HMS Cadmus (1903) was a Cadmus-class sloop launched in 1903 and sold in 1921.
- HMS Cadmus (J230) was an Algerine-class minesweeper launched in 1942 and sold to the Belgian Navy in 1950. She was renamed Georges Lecointe, and served until 1959. She was scrapped in 1960.
