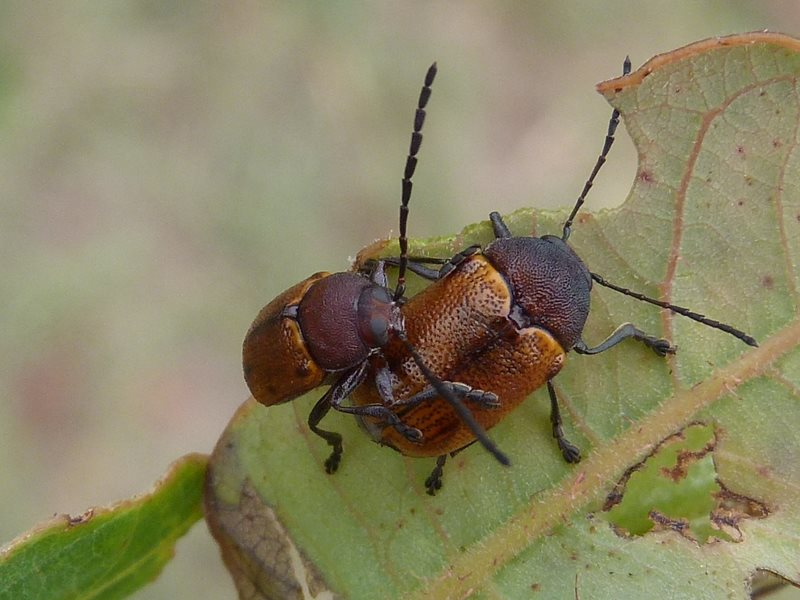
- Cadmus litiglossus

Scientific classification
- Kingdom: Animalia
- Phylum: Arthropoda
- Clade: Pancrustacea
- Class: Insecta
- Order: Coleoptera
- Suborder: Polyphaga
- Infraorder: Cucujiformia
- Family: Chrysomelidae
- Subfamily: Cryptocephalinae
- Genus: Cadmus; Erichson, 1842

= Cadmus (beetle) =

Genus of beetles

Cadmus is a genus of leaf beetles which are commonly called case bearing leaf beetles in the subfamily Cryptocephalinae. They are widespread throughout Australia and include 5 subgenera and 68 species.

Case bearing leaf beetles produce eggs encased in faecal material and larvae when hatched feed on leaf litter while housed in this protective home. The adults feed on Eucalyptus including Eucalyptus globulus but rarely become a major problem for forestry.

== Species ==
- Cadmus (Brachycaulus) colossus
- Cadmus (Cadmus) alternans
- Cadmus (Cadmus) apicalis
- Cadmus (Cadmus) crucicollis
- Cadmus (Cyphodera) chlamydiformis
- Cadmus (Lachnabothra) bicornutus
- Cadmus (Prionopleura) bifasciata
