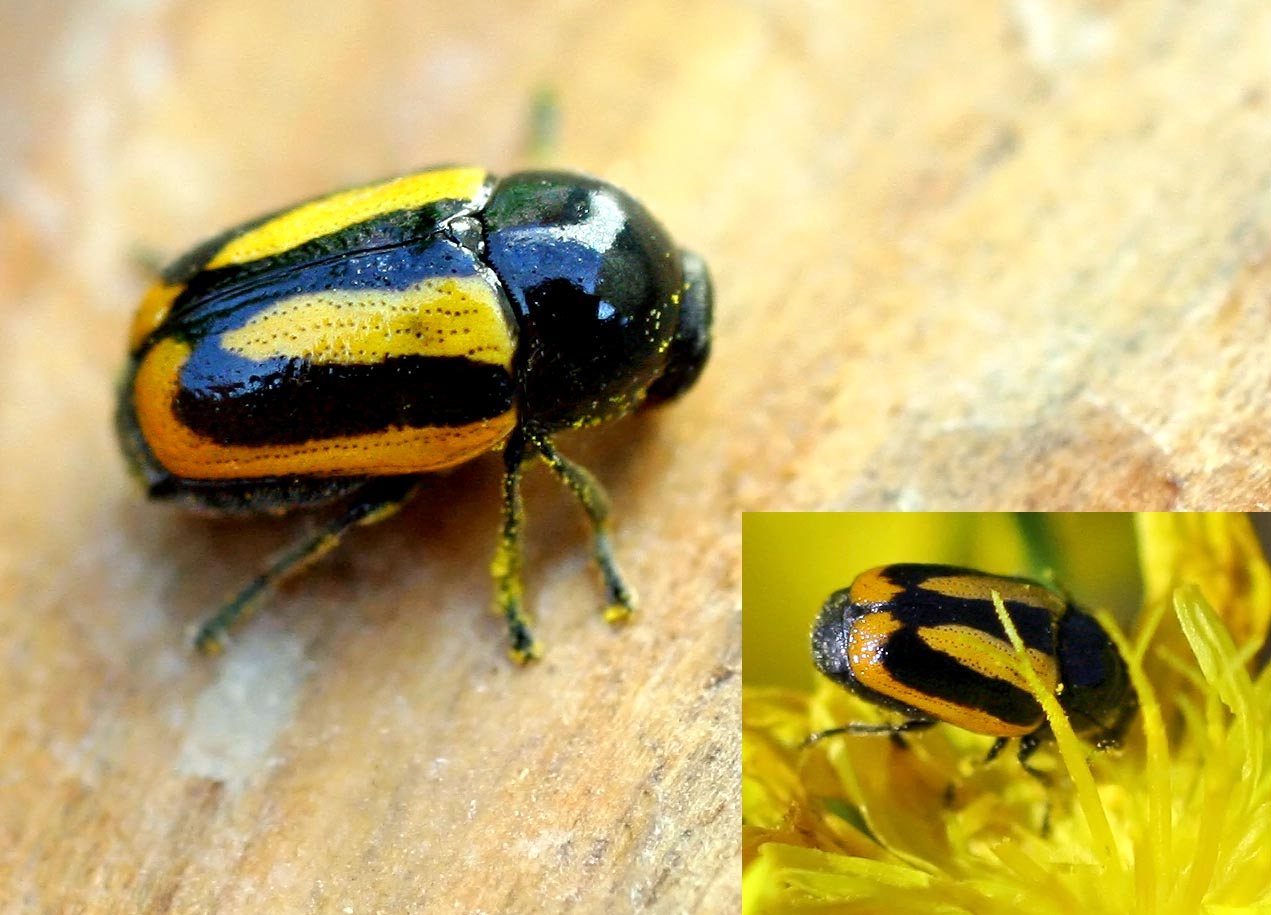
- Cryptocephalus vittatus

Scientific classification
- Kingdom: Animalia
- Phylum: Arthropoda
- Clade: Pancrustacea
- Class: Insecta
- Order: Coleoptera
- Suborder: Polyphaga
- Infraorder: Cucujiformia
- Family: Chrysomelidae
- Subfamily: Cryptocephalinae
- Tribe: Cryptocephalini
- Genus: Cryptocephalus; Geoffroy, 1762

Subgenera
- Asionus Lopatin, 1988; Burlinius Lopatin, 1965; Cryptocephalus Geoffroy, 1762; Disopus Chevrolat, 1836; Homalopus Chevrolat, 1837; Lamellosus Tomov, 1979; Protophysus Chevrolat, 1836

= Cryptocephalus =

Genus of leaf beetles

Cryptocephalus is a genus of leaf beetles in the subfamily Cryptocephalinae and belonging to the group of case-bearing leaf beetles called the Camptosomata.

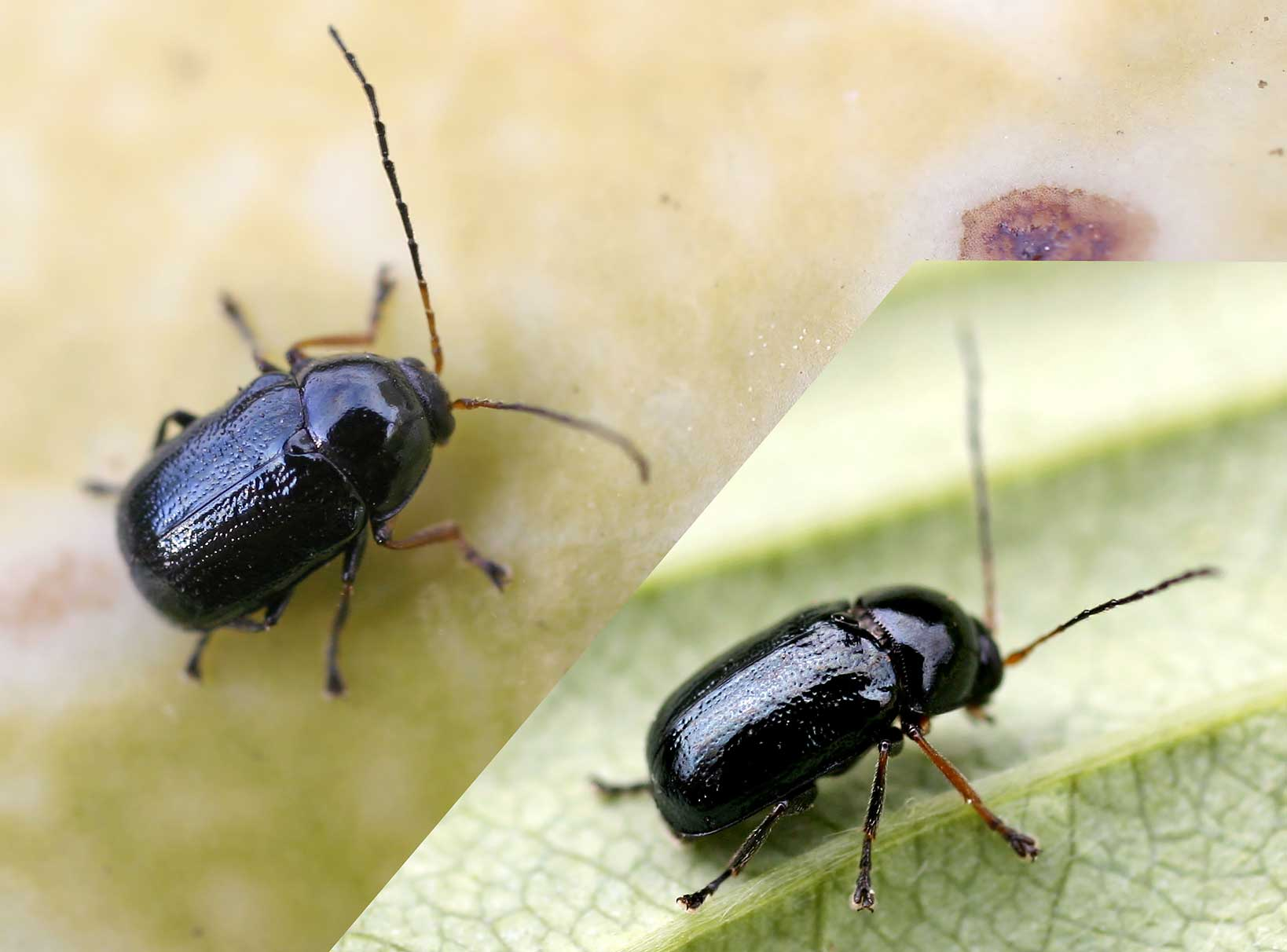
Cryptocephalus nitidus

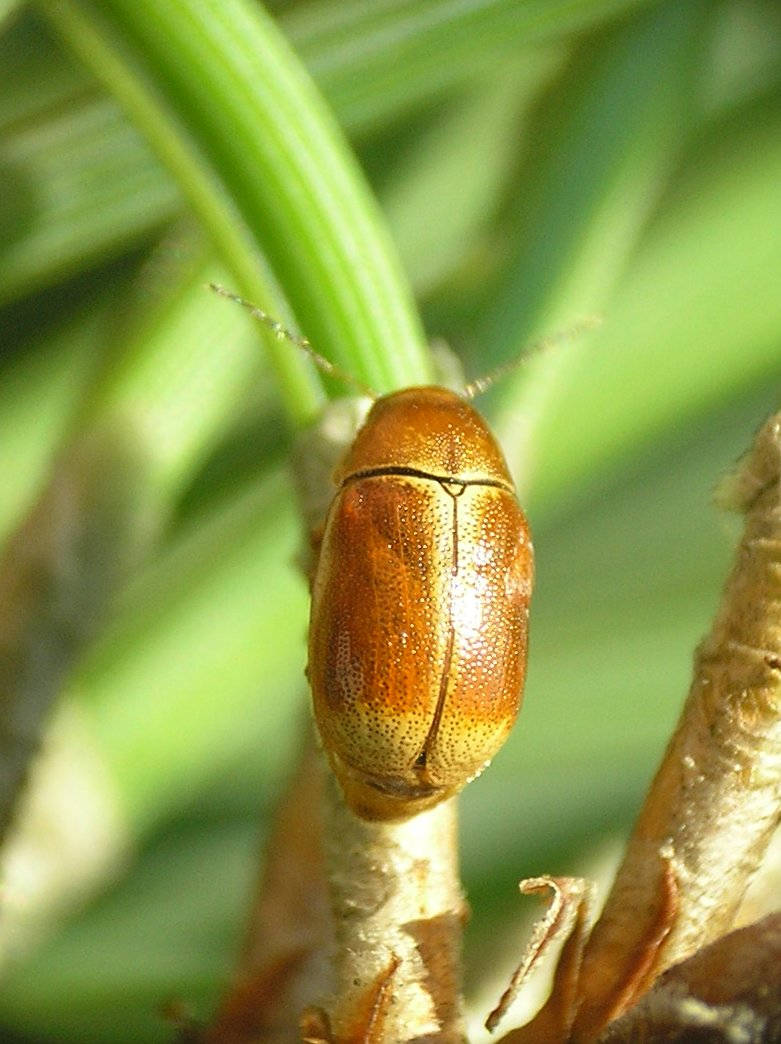
Cryptocephalus pini

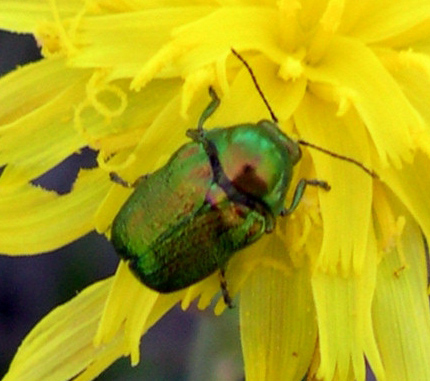
Cryptocephalus sericeus

== See also ==
- List of Cryptocephalus species
