= List of dams and reservoirs in Turkey =

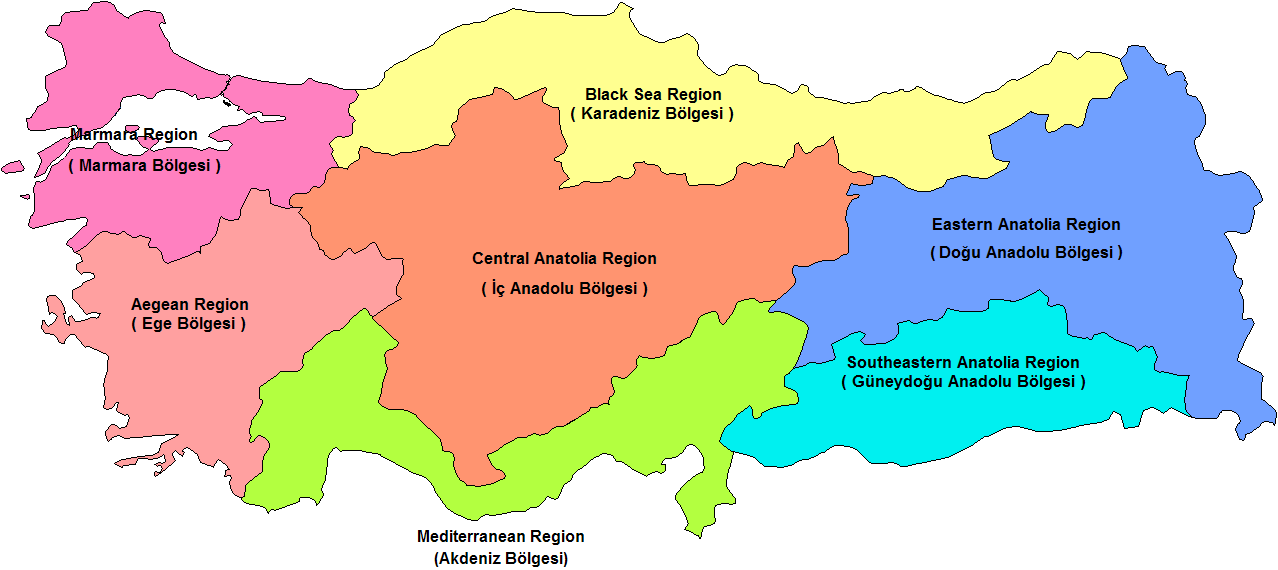
Regions of Turkey

Below is a partial list of dams in Turkey separated by region.

== Aegean Region ==
There are 45 dams in the Aegean Region, western part of Turkey.

- Adıgüzel Dam, Denizli
- Afşar Dam, Manisa
- Akgedik Dam, Muğla
- Akköprü Dam, Muğla
- Alaçatı Dam, İzmir
- Balçova Dam, İzmir (Reservoir empty since October 22nd 2025)
- Bayır Dam, Muğla
- Buldan Dam
- Cindere Dam
- Çavdarhisar Dam
- Çine Dam
- Geyik Dam
- Gelinalan Dam, planned, İzmir
- Gökpınar Dam
- Gördes Dam (Reservoir empty since August 9th 2025)
- Güzelhisar Dam
- Işıklı Dam
- İkizdere Dam
- Kabakum Dam, planned, İzmir
- Karacasu Dam
- Kavakdere Dam
- Kayaboğazı Dam
- Kemer Dam
- Kestel Dam
- Kureyşler Dam
- Küçükler Dam
- Marmaris Dam
- Mumcular Dam
- Örenler Dam
- Seferihisar Dam
- Selevir Dam
- Sevişler Dam
- Seyitler Dam
- Söğüt Dam
- Tahtalı Dam
- Topçam Dam
- Ürkmez Dam
- Yaylakavak Dam
- Yenidere Dam
- Yortanlı Dam

== Black Sea Region ==
There are 55 dams in the Black Sea Region, northern part of Turkey.

- Alaca Dam, Çorum
- Almus Dam, Tokat
- Alpu Dam, Tokat
- Altınkaya Dam, Samsun
- Ataköy Dam, Tokat
- Atasu Dam, Trabzon
- Arkun Dam
- Artvin Dam
- Belpınar Dam
- Beyler Dam
- Bezirgan Dam
- Borçka Dam
- Boyabat Dam
- Boztepe Dam
- Çakmak Dam
- Çatak Dam
- Çorum Dam
- Demirözü Dam
- Derbent Dam
- Deriner Dam
- Derinöz Dam
- Dodurga Dam
- Erfelek Dam
- Germeçtepe Dam
- Gölköy Dam
- Gülüç Dam
- Güzelce Dam
- Hasan Uğurlu Dam
- Hasanlar Dam
- Hatap Dam
- Karaçomak Dam
- Karadere Dam
- Kızılcapınar Dam
- Kirazlıköprü Dam
- Koçhisar Dam
- Koruluk Dam
- Kozlu Dam
- Köprübaşı Dam
- Köse Dam
- Kulaksızlar Dam
- Kürtün Dam
- Muratlı Dam
- Obruk Dam
- Ondokuzmayıs Dam
- Saraydüzü Dam
- Sarayözü Dam
- Suat Uğurlu Dam
- Topçam Dam
- Tortum Dam
- Torul Dam
- Uluköy Dam
- Vezirköprü Dam
- Yedikır Dam
- Yenihayat Dam
- Yusufeli Dam

== Central Anatolia Region ==
There are 75 dams in the Central Anatolia Region, central part of Turkey.

- 4 Eylül Dam, Sivas
- Ağcaşar Dam, Kayseri
- Akhasan Dam, Çankırı
- Akkaya Dam, Niğde
- Akköy Dam, Kayseri
- Akyar Dam, Ankara
- Altınapa Dam, Konya
- Altınhisar Dam, Niğde
- Apa Dam, Konya
- Asartepe Dam, Ankara
- Aşağı Karaören Dam
- Ayhanlar Dam, Nevşehir
- Ayrancı Dam, Karaman
- Bahçelik Dam, Kayseri
- Bayındır Dam, Ankara
- Beylikova Dam
- Bozkır Dam
- Çamlıdere Dam
- Çamlıgöze Dam
- Çatören Dam
- Çoğun Dam
- Çubuk-1 Dam
- Çubuk-2 Dam
- Damsa Dam
- Deliçay Dam
- Derebucak Dam
- Doyduk Dam
- Eğrekkaya Dam
- Ermenek Dam
- Gazibey Dam
- Gebere Dam, Niğde
- Gelingüllü Dam
- Gödet Dam
- Gökçekaya Dam, Eskişehir
- Gölova Dam
- Güldürcek Dam
- Gümüşler Dam
- Gürsöğüt Dam
- Hirfanlı Dam
- İbrala Dam
- İmranlı Dam
- İvriz Dam
- Kapulukaya Dam
- Karacalar Dam
- Karaova Dam
- Kargı Dam
- Kaymaz Dam
- Kesikköprü Dam
- Kılıçkaya Dam, Sivas
- Kovalı Dam
- Kunduzlar Dam
- Kurtboğazı Dam
- Kuzfındık Dam
- Kültepe Dam
- Maksutlu Dam
- Mamasın Dam
- May Dam
- Mursal Dam
- Murtaza Dam
- Musaözü Dam
- Özen Dam
- Porsuk Dam
- Sarımsaklı Dam
- Sarıoğlan Dam
- Sarıyar Dam, Ankara
- Sıddıklı Dam
- Sille Dam, Konya
- Süreyyabey Dam
- Tatlarin Dam
- Uzunlu Dam
- Yahyasaray Dam
- Yapıaltın Dam
- Yenice Dam
- Yeşilburç Dam

== Eastern Anatolia Region ==
There are 40 dams in the Eastern Anatolia region, eastern part of Turkey

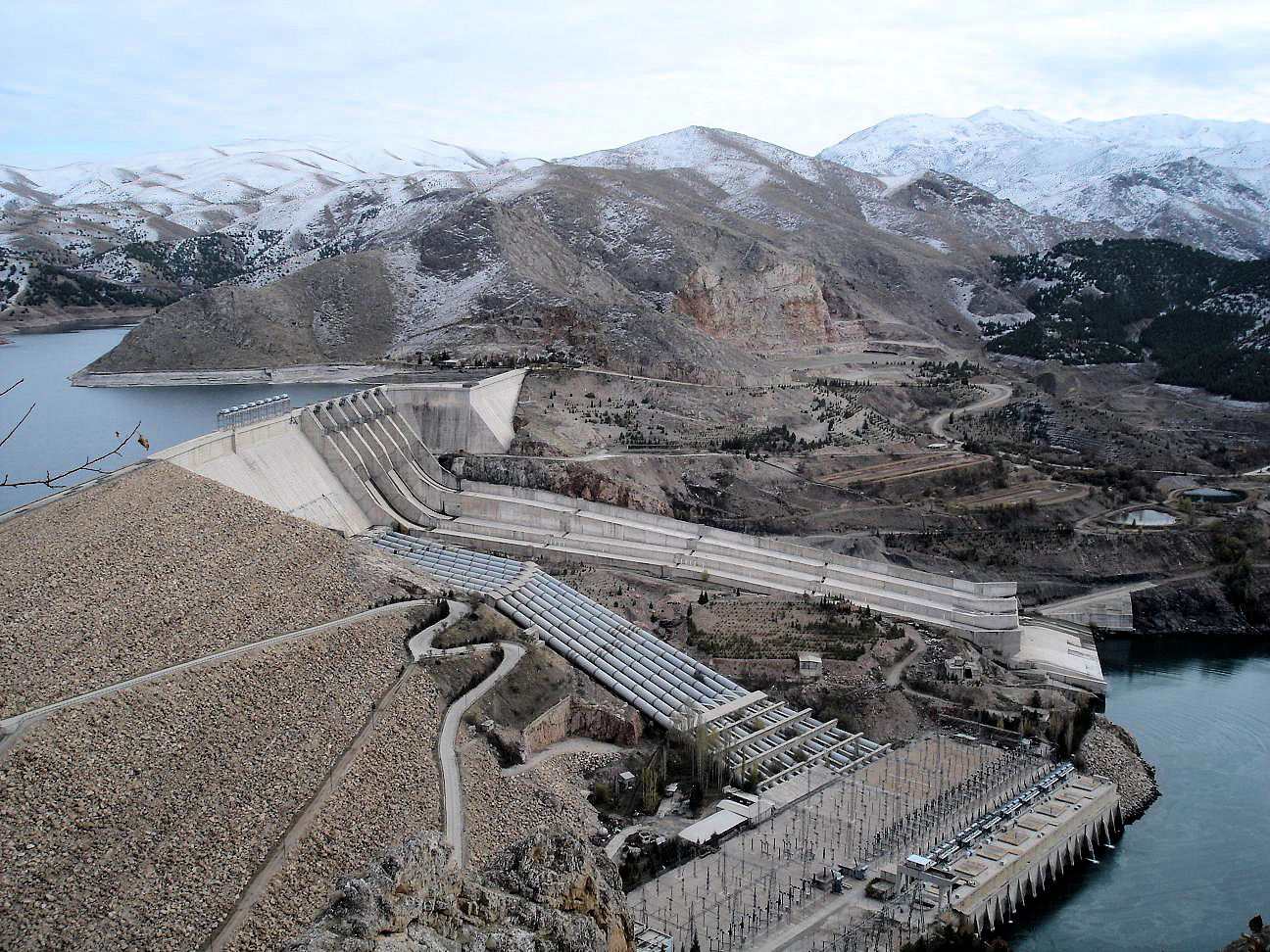
Keban Dam.

- Alpaslan-1 Dam, Muş
- Alpaslan-2 Dam, Muş
- Arpaçay Dam, Kars
- Bağıştaş 1 Dam
- Bağıştaş 2 Dam
- Başköy Dam, Erzurum
- Bayburt Dam, Kars
- Beyhan I Dam
- Beyhan II Dam, planned, Elazığ
- Boztepe Dam
- Cip Dam
- Çamgazi Dam
- Çat Dam
- Çıldır Dam
- Demirdöven Dam
- Dilimli Dam
- Erzincan Dam
- Gayt Dam
- Girlevik Dam
- Girlevik II Dam
- Gülbahar Dam
- Kalecik Dam
- Kapıkaya Dam
- Keban Dam, Elazığ
- Kığı Dam
- Koçköprü Dam
- Kuzgun Dam
- Medik Dam
- Morgedik Dam
- Özlüce Dam
- Palandöken Dam
- Patnos Dam
- Pazaryolu Dam
- Pembelik Dam
- Polat Dam
- Sarımehmet Dam
- Seyrantepe Dam
- Sultansuyu Dam
- Sürgü Dam
- Tatar Dam
- Tercan Dam
- Uzunçayır Dam
- Yazıcı Dam
- Yedisu Dam
- Yoncalı Dam
- Zernek Dam

== Marmara Region ==
There are 50 dams in the Marmara region, northwestern part of Turkey.

- Alibey Dam, Istanbul
- Altınyazı Dam, Edirne
- Armağan Dam, Kırklareli
- Atikhisar Dam, Çanakkale
- Ayvacık Dam, Çanakkale
- Babasultan Dam, Bursa
- Bakacak Dam, Çanakkale
- Bayramdere Dam
- Bayramiç Dam
- Boğazköy Dam
- Büyükçekmece Dam
- Büyükorhan Dam
- Çakmak Dam
- Çamköy Dam
- Çaygören Dam
- Çınarcık Dam
- Çokal Dam
- Darıdere Dam
- Darlık Dam
- Demirtaş Dam
- Devecikonağı Dam
- Doğancı-1 Dam
- Elmalı-2 Dam
- Gökçe Dam
- Gökçeada Dam
- Gölbaşı Dam
- Gölpazarı Dam
- Gönen Dam
- Günyurdu Dam
- Hasanağa Dam
- Havran Dam
- İkizcetepeler Dam
- Kadıköy Dam
- Karaidemir Dam
- Kayalıköy Dam
- Kırklareli Dam
- Kızıldamlar Dam
- Kirazdere Dam
- Koyuntepe Dam
- Madra Dam
- Manyas Dam
- Ömerli Dam
- Sarıbeyler Dam
- Sazlıdere Dam
- Sultanköy Dam
- Süloğlu Dam
- Taşoluk Dam
- Tayfur Dam
- Terkos Dam
- Umurbey Dam
- Valide Dam, Istanbul

== Mediterranean Region ==
There are 41 dams in the Mediterranean Region, southern part of Turkey, with 1 dam under construction

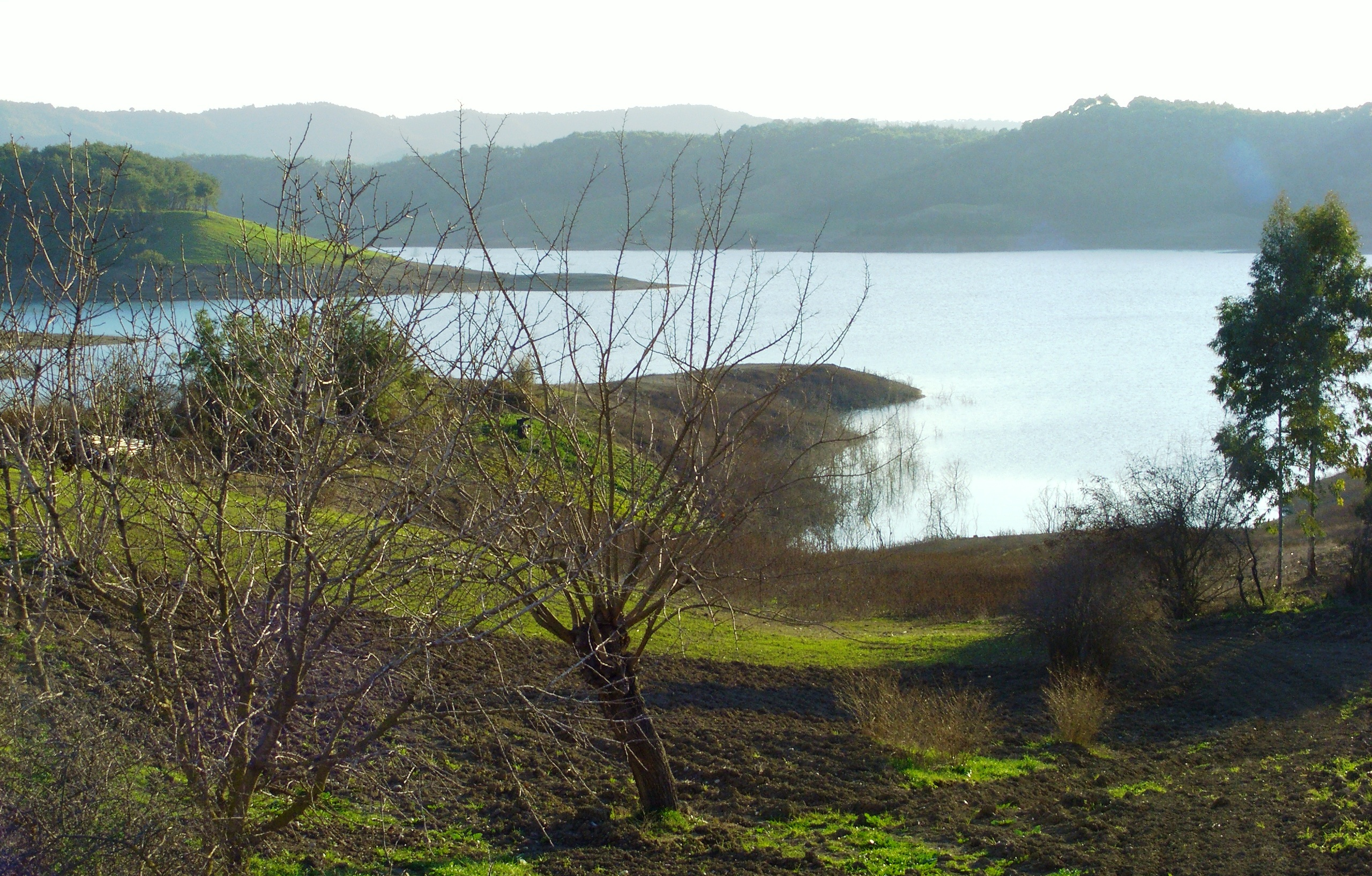
Çatalan Dam.

- Adatepe Dam, Kahramanmaraş
- Alakır Dam, Antalya
- Alaköprü Dam
- Aslantaş Dam, Osmaniye
- Ayvalı Dam, Kahramanmaraş
- Bademli Dam, Burdur
- Belkaya Dam
- Berdan Dam
- Berke Dam, Osmaniye
- Çatalan Dam
- Çavdır Dam
- Çayboğazı Dam
- Dim Dam
- Friendship Dam
- Gezende Dam
- Göktaş Dam
- Kadıncık 1
- Kadıncık 2
- Kalecik Dam
- Karacaören-1 Dam
- Karacaören-2 Dam
- Karaçal Dam
- Karamanlı Dam
- Kartalkaya Dam
- Kavşak Bendi Dam
- Kılavuzlu Dam
- Kızılsu Dam
- Kopru Dam
- Korkuteli Dam
- Kozan Dam
- Kozağacı Dam
- Manavgat Dam
- Mehmetli Dam
- Menzelet Dam
- Nergizlik Dam
- Onaç-1 Dam
- Onaç-2 Dam
- Otluca HES
- Oymapınar Dam, Antalya
- Seyhan Dam, Adana
- Sır Dam, Kahramanmaraş
- Silifke HES
- Sorgun Dam
- Sücüllü Dam
- Tahtaköprü Dam
- Uluborlu Dam
- Yalvaç Dam
- Yapraklı Dam
- Yarseli Dam
- Yayladağ Dam

== Southeastern Anatolia Region ==
There are 20 dams in the Southeastern Anatolia Region, eastern part of Turkey, with a further 9 dams under construction and 5 dams planned.

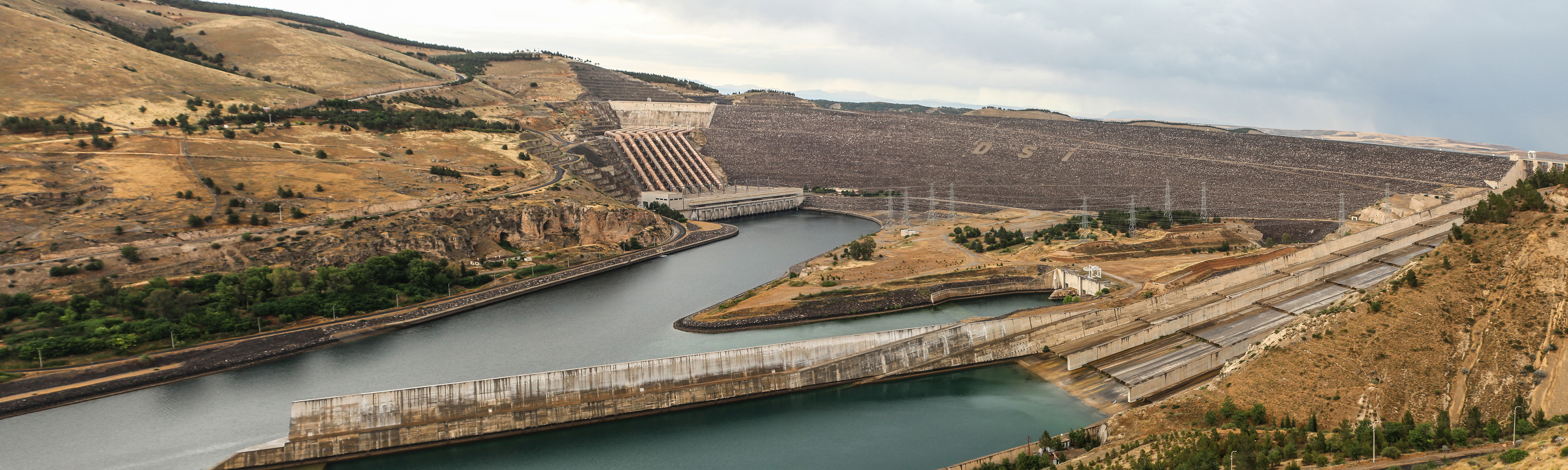
Atatürk Dam.

- Alkumru Dam
- Aslandağ Dam, Hakkâri
- Atatürk Dam, Adıyaman and Şanlıurfa
- Balli Dam, Şırnak
- Batman Dam, Batman
- Beyyurdu Dam, Hakkâri
- Birecik Dam, Şanlıurfa
- Burç Bendi Dam
- Çetintepe Dam, Şırnak, under construction
- Çetin Dam, Siirt, under construction
- Cizre Dam, planned
- Çocuktepe Dam, Hakkâri, under construction
- Devegeçidi Dam, Diyarbakır
- Dicle Dam, Diyarbakır
- Dumluca Dam
- Erkenek Dam
- Göksu Dam
- Hacıhıdır Dam
- Hancağız Dam
- Ilısu Dam, Şırnak
- Upper Kaleköy Dam
- Lower Kaleköy Dam, planned
- Karakaya Dam, Diyarbakır and Mardin
- Karkamış Dam, Gaziantep
- Kavşaktepe Dam, Şırnak, under construction
- Kayacık Dam
- Kirazlık Dam, Siirt
- Kralkızı Dam, Batman
- Musatepe Dam, Şırnak, under construction
- Seve Dam
- Silopi Dam, Şırnak
- Silvan Dam, under construction
- Sırımtaş Dam
- Şırnak Dam, Şırnak
- Uludere Dam, Şırnak, under construction
