= Hınıs Başköy Dam =

Coordinates: 39.4090°N 41.6573°E

- Location: Turkey

Hınıs Başköy Dam is a dam in Turkey. The development was backed by the Turkish State Hydraulic Works.

== See also ==
- List of dams and reservoirs in Turkey
