= Maksutlu =

Maksutlu can refer to:

- Maksutlu, Kargı
- Maksutlu Dam
