= Girlevik II Dam =

- Location: Turkey

Girlevik II Dam is a dam in Turkey. The development was backed by the Turkish State Hydraulic Works.

== See also ==
- List of dams and reservoirs in Turkey
