= Koçköprü Dam =

- Location: Turkey
- Coordinates: 39.1222°N 43.3284°E
- Construction began: 1978
- Opening date: 1992

Dam and spillways
- Length: 693 meters

Koçköprü Dam is a dam in the Van province of Eastern Turkey. The development was backed by the Turkish State Hydraulic Works.

When it was built between 1978 and 1992, the dam was constructed over the old Ağaçören village. A hydroelectric power plant that is placed over the dam started operation in 2020, and the reservoir water level has since decreased. This has resulted in a large amount of human bones being washed ashore.

== See also ==
- List of dams and reservoirs in Turkey
