= Işıklı Dam =

- Interactive map of Işıklı Dam
- Location: Turkey
- Coordinates: 38.2127°N 29.8302°E

Işıklı Dam is a dam in Denizli Province, Turkey, built between 1950 and 1953. The development was backed by the Turkish State Hydraulic Works.

== See also ==
- List of dams and reservoirs in Turkey
