= İkizcetepeler Dam =

Coordinates: 39.4916°N 27.9398°E

- Location: Turkey

İkizcetepeler Dam is a dam in Turkey. The development was backed by the Turkish State Hydraulic Works.

== See also ==
- List of dams and reservoirs in Turkey
