= Gölbaşı Dam =

Coordinates: 40.2193°N 29.3195°E

- Location: Turkey

Gölbaşı Dam is a dam in Turkey. The development was backed by the Turkish State Hydraulic Works.

== See also ==
- List of dams and reservoirs in Turkey
