= Seferihisar Dam =

- Location: Turkey
- Coordinates: 38.2159°N 26.8777°E

Seferihisar Dam is a dam in İzmir Province, Turkey, between 1987 and 1993. The development was backed by the Turkish State Hydraulic Works.

== See also ==
- List of dams and reservoirs in Turkey
