= Elmalı-2 Dam =

Coordinates: 41.0761°N 29.1176°E

- Location: Istanbul, Turkey
- Purpose: Freshwater
- Status: Operational
- Construction began: 1952
- Opening date: 1955

Dam and spillways
- Type of dam: Gravity dam
- Height (foundation): 42 m
- Dam volume: 103,000 m³

Reservoir
- Total capacity: 10,000,000 m³
- Surface area: 3 km²

Elmalı-2 Dam is a dam in Istanbul, Turkey. The development was backed by the Turkish State Hydraulic Works. Construction on the concrete dam began in 1952, and finished in 1955. It is still in operation.

== See also ==
- List of dams and reservoirs in Turkey
