= Atasu Dam =

- Location within Turkey
- Official name: Atasu Baraji
- Country: Turkey
- Location: Trabzon
- Coordinates: 40°51′22″N 39°41′58″E
- Construction began: 1998
- Opening date: 2010
- Owner: Turkish State Hydraulic Works

Dam and spillways
- Type of dam: Embankment, concrete-face rock-fill
- Impounds: Galyan River
- Height: 118 m (387 ft)
- Length: 372 m (1,220 ft)
- Width (crest): 8 m (26 ft)
- Dam volume: 3,800,000 m^{3} (4,970,212 cu yd)

Reservoir
- Creates: 36,000,000 m^{3} (29,186 acre⋅ft)
- Surface area: 1 km^{2} (0 mi^{2})

Power Station
- Installed capacity: 5 MW
- Annual generation: 27 GWh

Atasu Dam is a concrete-face rock-fill dam on the Gaylan River, 16 km (10 mi) south of Trabzon in Trabzon Province, Turkey. It was built between 1998 and 2010 for the primary purpose of drinking water supply but also has a 5 MW hydroelectric power station.

== See also ==
- List of dams and reservoirs in Turkey
