= Kovalı Dam =

- Location: Turkey
- Coordinates: 38.1694°N 35.1465°E

Kovalı Dam is a dam in Turkey. The development was backed by the Turkish State Hydraulic Works.

Kovalı Dam is situated 3 km southwest of Kovalı Mah.

== See also ==
- List of dams and reservoirs in Turkey
