= Gölova Dam =

Coordinates: 40.0444°N 38.6211°E

- Location: Turkey

Gölova Dam is a dam in Turkey. The development was backed by the Turkish State Hydraulic Works.

== See also ==
- List of dams and reservoirs in Turkey
