= Beylikova Dam =

Coordinates: 39°43′37.2″N 31°12′19.8″E

- Interactive map of Beylikova Dam
- Location: Turkey

Beylikova Dam is a dam in Eskişehir Province, Turkey. It was built between 1996 and 2002.

== See also ==
- List of dams and reservoirs in Turkey
