= Medik Dam =

- Location: Turkey
- Coordinates: 38.5106°N 38.0631°E

Medik Dam is a dam in Turkey. The development was backed by the Turkish State Hydraulic Works.

== See also ==
- List of dams and reservoirs in Turkey
