= Uluborlu Dam =

- Location: Turkey
- Coordinates: 38.0579°N 30.4145°E

Uluborlu Dam is a dam in Turkey. The development was backed by the Turkish State Hydraulic Works.

== See also ==
- List of dams and reservoirs in Turkey
