= Karaova Dam =

- Location: Turkey
- Coordinates: 39.5584°N 33.9111°E
- Construction began: 1991
- Opening date: 1998

Dam and spillways
- Height: 66 metres (217 ft)

Reservoir
- Total capacity: 1920 dam^{3}
- Surface area: 4 km^{3}

Karaova Dam is a dam in Kırşehir Province, Turkey. The development was backed by the Turkish State Hydraulic Works.

== See also ==
- List of dams and reservoirs in Turkey
