= Köprübaşı Dam =

Coordinates: 40.9880°N 31.9068°E

- Location: Zonguldak Province, Turkey
- Construction began: 2002
- Opening date: 2009

Dam and spillways
- Impounds: Bolu River
- Height: 108 m (354 ft)

Reservoir
- Total capacity: 199,000,000 m^{3} (161,332 acre⋅ft)
- Surface area: 5.2 km^{2} (2 sq mi)

Power Station
- Installed capacity: 80.88 MW
- Annual generation: 203 GWh

Köprübaşı Dam is an embankment dam on the Bolu River Zonguldak Province, Turkey. The development was backed by the Turkish State Hydraulic Works.

== See also ==
- List of dams and reservoirs in Turkey
