= Gelingüllü Dam =

Coordinates: 39.6094°N 35.0437°E

- Location: Turkey
- Construction began: 1986
- Website https://structurae.net/en/structures/gelingullu-dam

Gelingüllü Dam is a dam in Yozgat, Turkey. The development was backed by the Turkish State Hydraulic Works.

== See also ==
- List of dams and reservoirs in Turkey
