= Kozlu Dam =

- Interactive map of Kozlu Dam
- Location: Turkey
- Coordinates: 41.4199°N 31.8015°E
- Construction began: 1979
- Opening date: 1986

Kozlu Dam is a dam in Zonguldak Province, Turkey, built between 1979 and 1986. The development was backed by the Turkish State Hydraulic Works.

== See also ==
- List of dams and reservoirs in Turkey
