= Sarıoğlan Dam =

Coordinates: 39.0166°N 36.0876°E

- Interactive map of Sarıoğlan Dam
- Location: Turkey

Sarıoğlan Dam is a dam in Turkey. The development was backed by the Turkish State Hydraulic Works.

== See also ==
- List of dams and reservoirs in Turkey
