= Tatlarin Dam =

- Interactive map of Tatlarin Dam
- Location: Turkey
- Coordinates: 38.6189°N 34.4885°E
- Construction began: 1964
- Opening date: 1967

Tatlarin Dam is a dam in Nevşehir Province, Turkey. The Turkish State Hydraulic Works commissioned the project, and construction began in 1964. The Tatlarin Dam began operating in 1967. The development was backed by the Turkish State Hydraulic Works (Turkish: Devlet Su İşleri).

== See also ==
- List of dams and reservoirs in Turkey
