= Örenler Dam =

Coordinates: 38.6125°N 30.2235°E

- Location: Turkey

Örenler Dam is a dam in Afyonkarahisar Province, Turkey, built between 1987 and 1993. The development was backed by the Turkish State Hydraulic Works.

== See also ==
- List of dams and reservoirs in Turkey
