= Çamlıgöze Dam =

Dam in Sivas, Turkey

Coordinates: 40.2291°N 38.0767°E

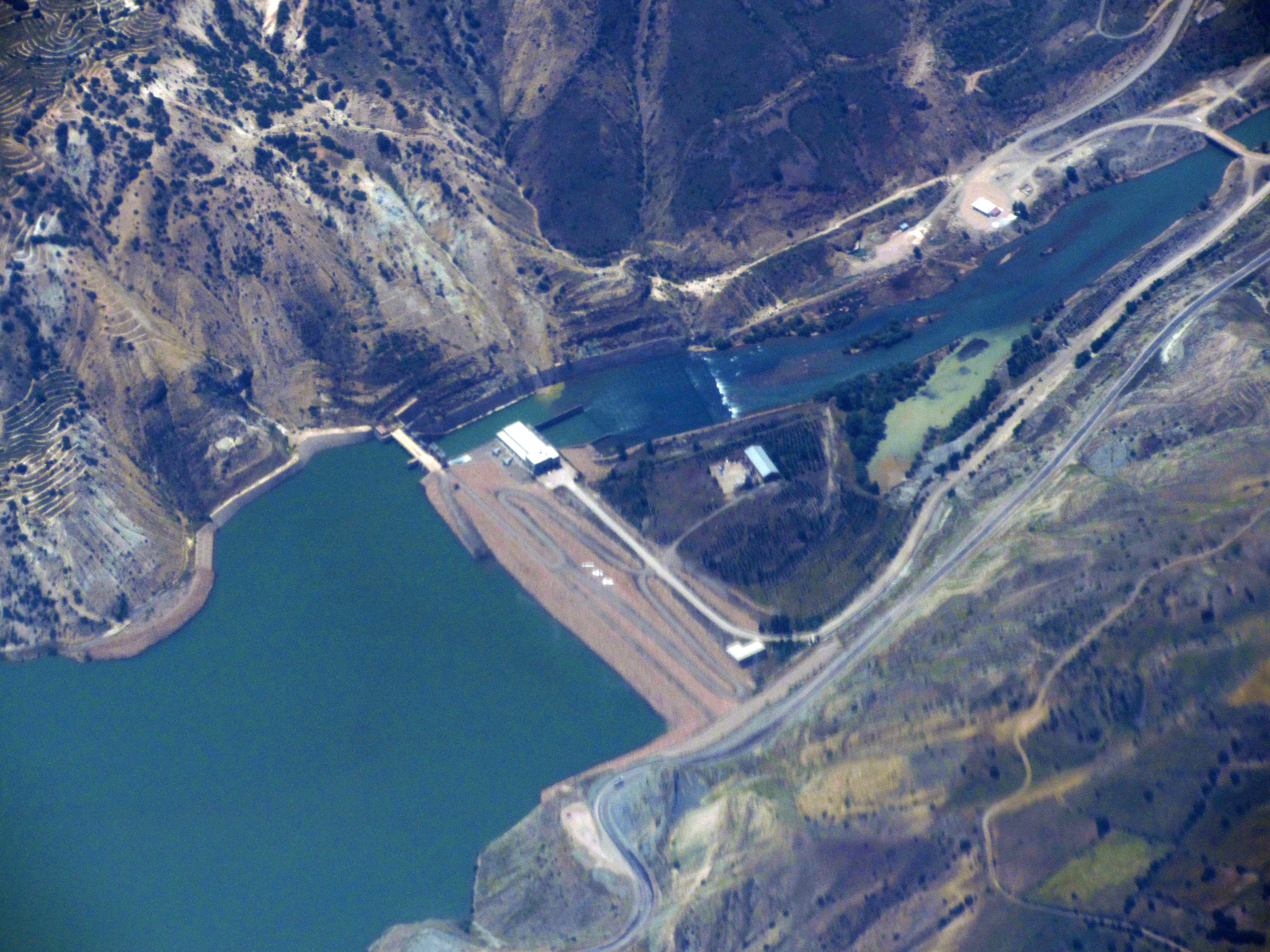
- Location: Turkey
- Construction began: 1987
- Opening date: 1998

Dam and spillways
- Impounds: Kelkit River
- Height: 38 m (125 ft)

Reservoir
- Total capacity: 50,000,000 m^{3} (40,536 acre⋅ft)
- Surface area: 5 km^{2} (2 sq mi)

Power Station
- Installed capacity: 33 MW
- Annual generation: 88 GWh

Çamlıgöze Dam is an embankment dam on the Kelkit River in Sivas Province, Turkey. The development was backed by the Turkish State Hydraulic Works.

== See also ==
- List of dams and reservoirs in Turkey
