= Vezirköprü Dam =

- Interactive map of Vezirköprü Dam
- Location: Turkey
- Construction began: 1993
- Opening date: 2001

Vezirköprü Dam is a dam in Samsun Province, Turkey, built between 1993 and 2001. The development was backed by the Turkish State Hydraulic Works.

== See also ==
- List of dams and reservoirs in Turkey
