= Sarayözü Dam =

- Location: Turkey
- Coordinates: 40.9202°N 35.1948°E
- Construction began: 1986
- Opening date: 1989

Sarayözü Dam is a dam in Amasya Province, Turkey, built between 1986 and 1989. The development was backed by the Turkish State Hydraulic Works.

== See also ==
- List of dams and reservoirs in Turkey
