= Darlık Dam =

Coordinates: 41.115°N 29.5678°E

- Location: Turkey

Darlık Dam is a dam in Istanbul, Turkey. The development was backed by the Turkish State Hydraulic Works.

== See also ==
- List of dams and reservoirs in Turkey
