= Uzunçayır Dam =

- Location within Turkey
- Official name: Uzunçayır Baraji
- Country: Turkey
- Location: Tunceli
- Coordinates: 38°58′58″N 39°31′51″E
- Status: Operational
- Construction began: 1994
- Opening date: 2009
- Owner: Turkish State Hydraulic Works

Dam and spillways
- Type of dam: Embankment, clay-core sand-gravel fill
- Impounds: Munzur River
- Height: 58 m (190 ft)
- Dam volume: 2,800,000 m^{3} (3,662,262 cu yd)
- Spillway type: Chute, gate-controlled

Reservoir
- Total capacity: 308,000,000 m^{3} (249,700 acre⋅ft)
- Surface area: 13.43 km^{2} (5 mi^{2})

Power Station
- Turbines: 3 x 28 MW Francis-type
- Installed capacity: 84 MW

The Uzunçayır Dam is an embankment dam on the Munzur River, located 14 km (9 mi) south of Tunceli in Tunceli Province, Turkey. Constructed between 1994 and 2009, the development was backed by the Turkish State Hydraulic Works. The primary purpose of the dam is hydroelectric power generation and it supports an 84 MW power station.

== See also ==
- List of dams and reservoirs in Turkey
