= Güldürcek Dam =

Coordinates: 40.5694°N 32.9502°E

- Location: Turkey

Güldürcek Dam is a dam in Turkey. The development was backed by the Turkish State Hydraulic Works. During the 2000 Orta earthquake, the dam received longitudinal cracks that were not wider than 2 cm.

== See also ==
- List of dams and reservoirs in Turkey
