= Yedikır Dam =

- Location: Turkey
- Coordinates: 40.7772°N 35.5686°E
- Construction began: 1982
- Opening date: 1985

Yedikır Dam is a dam in Amasya Province, Turkey, built between 1982 and 1985. The development was backed by the Turkish State Hydraulic Works.

== See also ==
- List of dams and reservoirs in Turkey
