= Boğazköy Dam =

Coordinates: 40.1742°N 29.5244°E

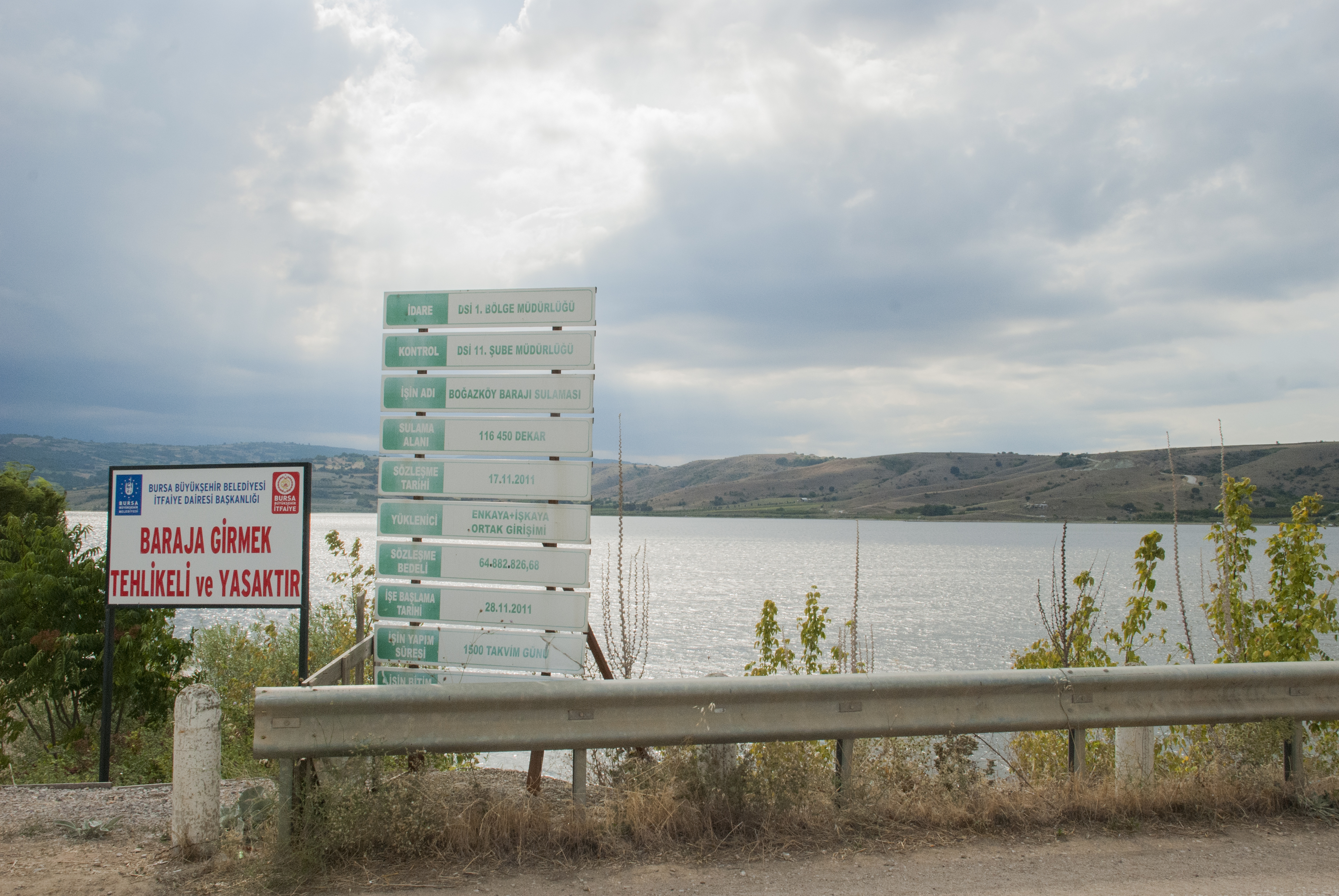
- Interactive map of Boğazköy Dam
- Location: Turkey

Boğazköy Dam is a dam in Bursa Province, Turkey. It was built between 1999 and 2005.

== See also ==
- List of dams and reservoirs in Turkey
