= Göksu Dam =

- Location within Turkey
- Interactive map of Göksu Dam
- Official name: Göksu Baraji
- Location: Diyarbakır, Turkey
- Coordinates: 37°41′01.68″N 40°26′41.64″E
- Purpose: Irrigation
- Status: Operational
- Construction began: 1987
- Opening date: 1991
- Owner: State Hydraulic Works

Dam and spillways
- Type of dam: Embankment, rock-fill
- Impounds: Göksu Stream
- Height: 52 m (171 ft)
- Length: 674 m (2,211 ft)
- Elevation at crest: 702 m (2,303 ft)
- Width (crest): 10 m (33 ft)
- Width (base): 226 m (741 ft)
- Dam volume: 1,900,000 m^{3} (1,540 acre⋅ft)
- Spillway type: Service overflow, uncontrolled
- Spillway capacity: 2,150 m^{3}/s (75,927 cu ft/s)

Reservoir
- Creates: Göksu Reservoir
- Total capacity: 56,000,000 m^{3} (45,000 acre⋅ft)
- Active capacity: 44,000,000 m^{3} (36,000 acre⋅ft)
- Inactive capacity: 12,000,000 m^{3} (9,700 acre⋅ft)
- Catchment area: 672 km^{2} (259 sq mi)
- Surface area: 4.2 km^{2} (1.6 mi^{2})
- Normal elevation: 700 m (2,300 ft)

Göksu Dam is a dam on Göksu Stream south of Diyarbakır city in Turkey. Constructed between 1987 and 1991, the development was backed by the Turkish State Hydraulic Works. The primary purpose of the dam is irrigation and it supplies water to 3,582 ha (8,850 acres).

== See also ==
- List of dams and reservoirs in Turkey
