= Gayt Dam =

Coordinates: 39.0248°N 40.3399°E

- Official name: Gayt Barajı
- Location: Turkey
- Construction began

Gayt Dam is a dam in the eastern part of Turkey. The dam spans the Gayt River (Gayt Çayı), a right-bank tributary of the Eastern Euphrates (Murat River). The development was backed by the Turkish State Hydraulic Works.

== See also ==
- List of dams and reservoirs in Turkey
