= Büyükorhan Dam =

Coordinates: 39.7937°N 28.9196°E

- Interactive map of Büyükorhan Dam
- Location: Büyükorhan, Bursa, Turkey
- Construction began: 1986
- Opening date: 1992

Dam and spillways
- Height: 36 m (118 ft)

Büyükorhan Dam is a dam in Turkey. The development was backed by the Turkish State Hydraulic Works.

== See also ==
- List of dams and reservoirs in Turkey
