= Alibey Dam =

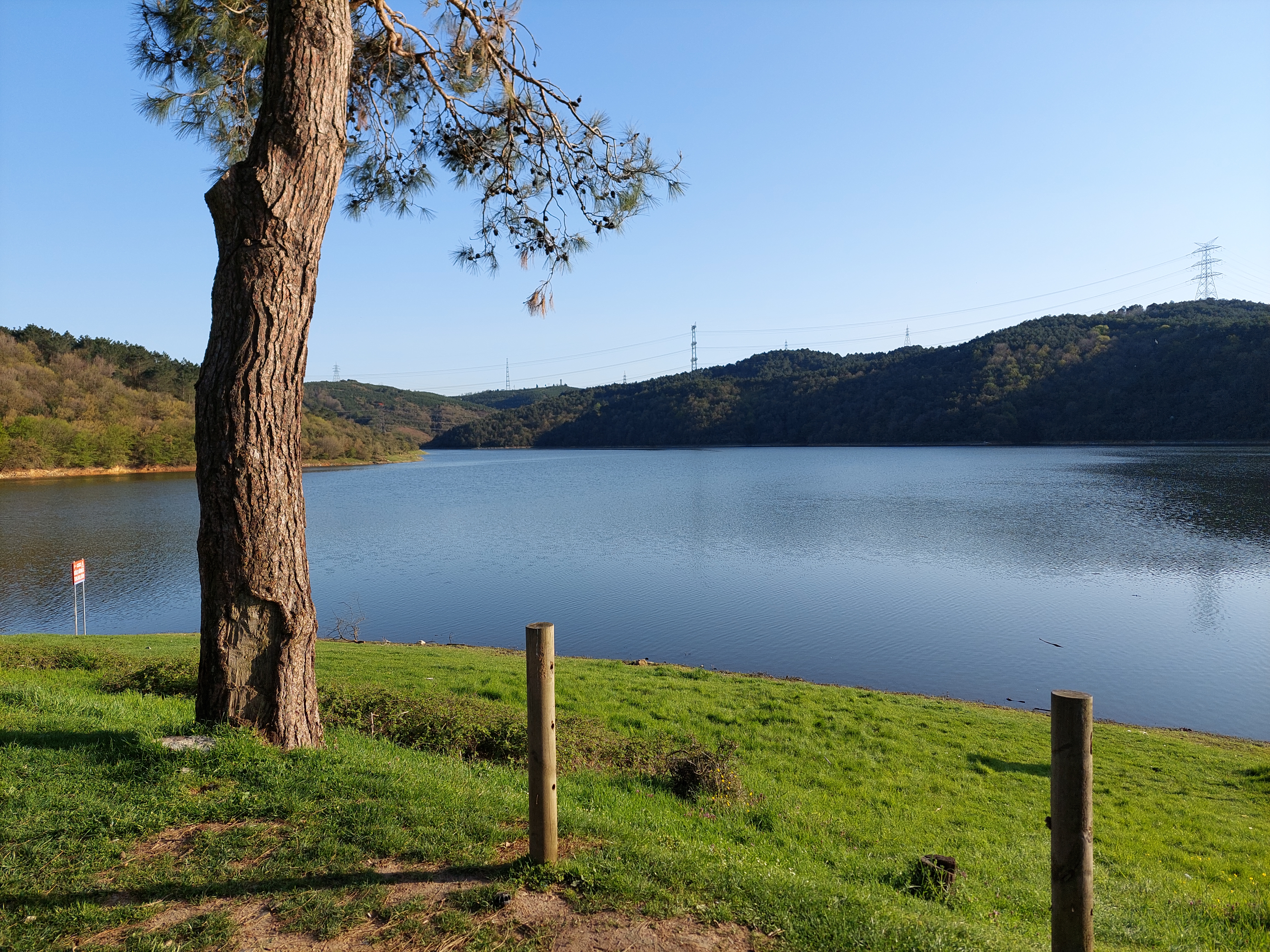

- Location within Turkey
- Official name: Alibey Barajı
- Location: Istanbul Province, Turkey
- Coordinates: 41.10138°N 28.92026°E
- Purpose: Freshwater
- Status: Operational
- Construction began: 1975
- Opening date: 1983

Dam and spillways
- Type of dam: Earth fill dam
- Impounds: Alibey Creek
- Height: 30 m (98 ft)
- Height (foundation): 30 m
- Dam volume: 1,930,000 m^{3} (68,000,000 ft^{3})

Reservoir
- Total capacity: 66.80 hm^{3} (0.01603 mi^{3})
- Surface area: 4.66 km^{2} (1.80 mi^{2})
- Website www.alibeybarajı

Alibey Dam (Turkish: Alibey Barajı) is a dam in Istanbul Province, Turkey, built between 1975 and 1983. It is an earthfill dam, and is still in operation.

== See also ==
- List of dams and reservoirs in Turkey
