= Bozkır Dam =

Coordinates: 38.7645°N 34.0864°E

- Interactive map of Bozkır Dam
- Location: Turkey

Bozkır Dam is a dam in Aksaray Province, Turkey. It was built between 1976 and 1980.

== See also ==
- List of dams and reservoirs in Turkey
