= Gazibey Dam =

Dam in Turkey

Coordinates: 39.3301°N 36.6661°E

- Location: Turkey

Gazibey Dam is a dam in Turkey. The development was backed by the Turkish State Hydraulic Works.

== See also ==
- List of dams and reservoirs in Turkey
