= Başköy Dam =

Coordinates: 39°24′31.7″N 41°39′28.5″E

- Interactive map of Başköy Dam
- Location: Turkey

Başköy Dam is a dam in Ağrı Province, Turkey. The Basköy Dam was begun the process of building in 1998 and was completed in 2003.

== Pipe Shipments ==
Hınıs Başköy Irrigation Dam Materials Procurement Part 2 (GRP Pipe)’ tender recently took the task of the "8th Regional Directorate of State Hydraulic Works" which was roughly "19 kilometers of GRP pipes ranging from DN600 to DN3400 and additional fittings" which had been supplied by Superlit to the construction site.

== See also ==
- List of dams and reservoirs in Turkey
