= Bayramiç Dam =

- Interactive map of Bayramiç Dam
- Location: Çanakkale Province, Turkey
- Purpose: Irrigation
- Status: Operational
- Construction began: 1986
- Opening date: 1997

Dam and spillways
- Type of dam: Earth fill dam
- Height (foundation): 56 m
- Dam volume: 3,900,000 m³

Reservoir
- Total capacity: 86,000,000 m³
- Surface area: 6 km²

Bayramiç Dam is a dam in Çanakkale Province, Turkey. It was built between 1986 and 1996.

In 2023, as water levels dropped, the remains of a Byzantine-era bath and church were revealed at coordinates 39.79424° N, 26.69084° E.

== See also ==
- List of dams and reservoirs in Turkey
