= Kapıkaya Dam =

Coordinates: 38°21′13″N 38°36′26″E

- Location: Turkey

Kapıkaya Dam is a dam in Turkey. The development was backed by the Turkish State Hydraulic Works.

== See also ==
- List of dams and reservoirs in Turkey
