= Ürkmez Dam =

Dam in İzmir Province, Turkey

- Location within Turkey
- Location: İzmir Province, Turkey
- Coordinates: 38°05′37″N 26°57′20″E
- Purpose: Irrigation, fresh water
- Construction began: 12 September 1985
- Opening date: 12 February 1990; 36 years ago
- Owner: State Hydraulic Works (DSİ)

Dam and spillways
- Type of dam: Embankment dam
- Impounds: Ürkmez Creek
- Height: 45 m (148 ft)
- Dam volume: 991,000 m^{3} (35,000,000 cu ft)

Reservoir
- Creates: Ürkmez Reservoir
- Total capacity: 7 hm^{3} (250,000,000 cu ft)
- Surface area: 0.57 km^{2} (0.22 sq mi)

Ürkmez Dam (Turkish: Ürkmez Barajı) is a dam in İzmir Province, Turkey, built between 1985 and 1990. The development was backed by the Turkish State Hydraulic Works.

Ürkmez Dam is located in Seferihisar district of İzmir Province, western Turkey. Its construction began on 12 September 1985 and completed on 12 February 1990.

It was reported by İzSu, the Water and Sewage Authority of İzmir Metropolitan Municipality, that in mid-January 2024, the water occupancy rate of the dam reservoir amounted to 28.58% compared to the same time in the previous year with 39.12%.

== Drinking Water Treatment Plant ==
The drinking water treatment plant was projected in 1992, and went in operation on 2 July 2004. It is operated by İzSu, the water and Sewage Authority of İzmir Metropolitan Municipality.

As long as the height of the reservoir water is more than 26 m (85 ft), water runs to the water purification plant without the need for pumping. When the water height drops under the 26 m (85 ft)-level, four pumps of 11 kW (15 hp) each are activated to transfer water in a pipeline of 400 mm (16 in) diameter to the water treatment plant, which is about 900 m (3,000 ft) away. The plant can supply 109 L/s (3.8 cu ft/s).

== See also ==
- List of dams and reservoirs in Turkey
