= Hasanlar Dam =

Coordinates: 40.911°N 31.2754°E

- Location: Turkey
- Construction began: 1965
- Opening date: 1972

Dam and spillways
- Height: 71 m (233 ft)

Power Station
- Installed capacity: 9 MW
- Annual generation: 42 MW

Hasanlar Dam is a dam in Düzce Province, Turkey, built between 1965 and 1972. The dam is located on Küçük Melen Creek. The development was backed by the Turkish State Hydraulic Works.

== See also ==
- List of dams and reservoirs in Turkey
