= Nergizlik Dam =

- Location: Turkey
- Coordinates: 37.2995°N 35.0486°E

Nergizlik Dam is a dam in Adana Province, Turkey. The development was backed by the Turkish State Hydraulic Works.

== See also ==
- List of dams and reservoirs in Turkey
