= Belpınar Dam =

Coordinates: 40.1828°N 35.9495°E

Belpinar Dam
- Interactive map of Belpinar Dam
- Location: Tokat Province, Turkey

Dam and spillways
- Impounds: Silisözü Stream
- Height: 61 metres (200 ft)

Belpınar Dam is a dam in Tokat Province, Turkey. It was built between 1977 and 1984.

== See also ==
- List of dams and reservoirs in Turkey
