= Çamköy Dam =

Coordinates: 39.463°N 28.1672°E

- Interactive map of Çamköy Dam
- Location: Turkey

Çamköy Dam is a boron wastewater collection dam in Balıkesir, Turkey. Wastewater from a nearby colemanite mine is collected in the dam. The wastewater from the mine has a high boron concentration (627.36 mg/L). The concentration of boron in the reservoir was found to vary slightly throughout the year, peaking in August. A study of the phytoplankton in the dam's reservoir found 44 taxa, 77% of which belonged to the Bacillariophyta.

== See also ==
- List of dams and reservoirs in Turkey
