= Yeşilburç Dam =

Dam in Niğde Province, Turkey

- Interactive map of Yeşilburç Dam
- Location: Turkey

Yeşilburç Dam is a dam in Turkey. The development was backed by the Turkish State Hydraulic Works.

== See also ==
- List of dams and reservoirs in Turkey
