= Patnos Dam =

- Official name: patnos dam
- Location: patnos, agri, Turkey
- Coordinates: 39.2742°N 42.8933°E

Dam and spillways
- Impounds: no road

Reservoir
- Creates: Asagigösmez

Patnos Dam is a dam in Turkey. The development was backed by the Turkish State Hydraulic Works.

Earth body filler type, the dam body volume of 1.3 million m3, stream bed height 38.00 m., normal water volume of the Lake at 33,40 hm3, normal water is Lake area at 4.35 km2. The dam provides irrigation Service 5.973 hectares.

== See also ==
- List of dams and reservoirs in Turkey
