= 4 Eylül Dam =

Dam in Sivas, Turkey

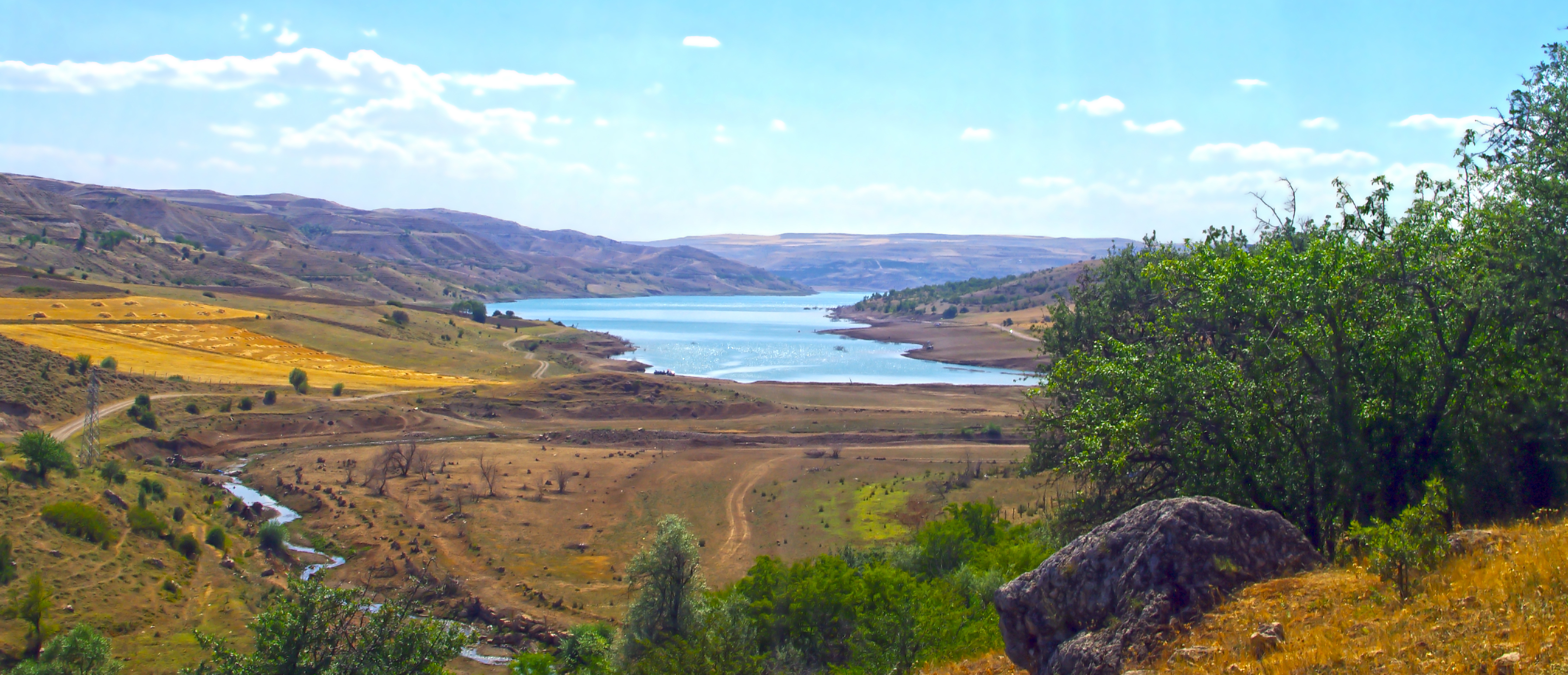
- 4 Eylül Dam
- Interactive map of 4 Eylül Dam
- Location: Turkey
- Coordinates: 39.833916°N 37.061605°E
- Purpose: Drinking water

Dam and spillways
- Height (thalweg): 65 metres (213 ft)

4 Eylül Dam (Turkish: Dört Eylül Baraji, lit. 'Four September Dam') is a dam in Sivas Province, Turkey, built between 1996 and 2002. The dam is the source of drinking water for Sivas, 10 km to the southeast. It was built to fulfill the drinking needs of that province. The dam provides 33 hm^{3} of drinking water annually. It is located on the Mısmıl river and has a drainage area of 236.8 km^{2}, which is fed by other streams.

== See also ==
- List of dams and reservoirs in Turkey
