= Ayvacık Dam =

Coordinates: 39°36′11″N 26°27′07″E

Ayvacik Dam
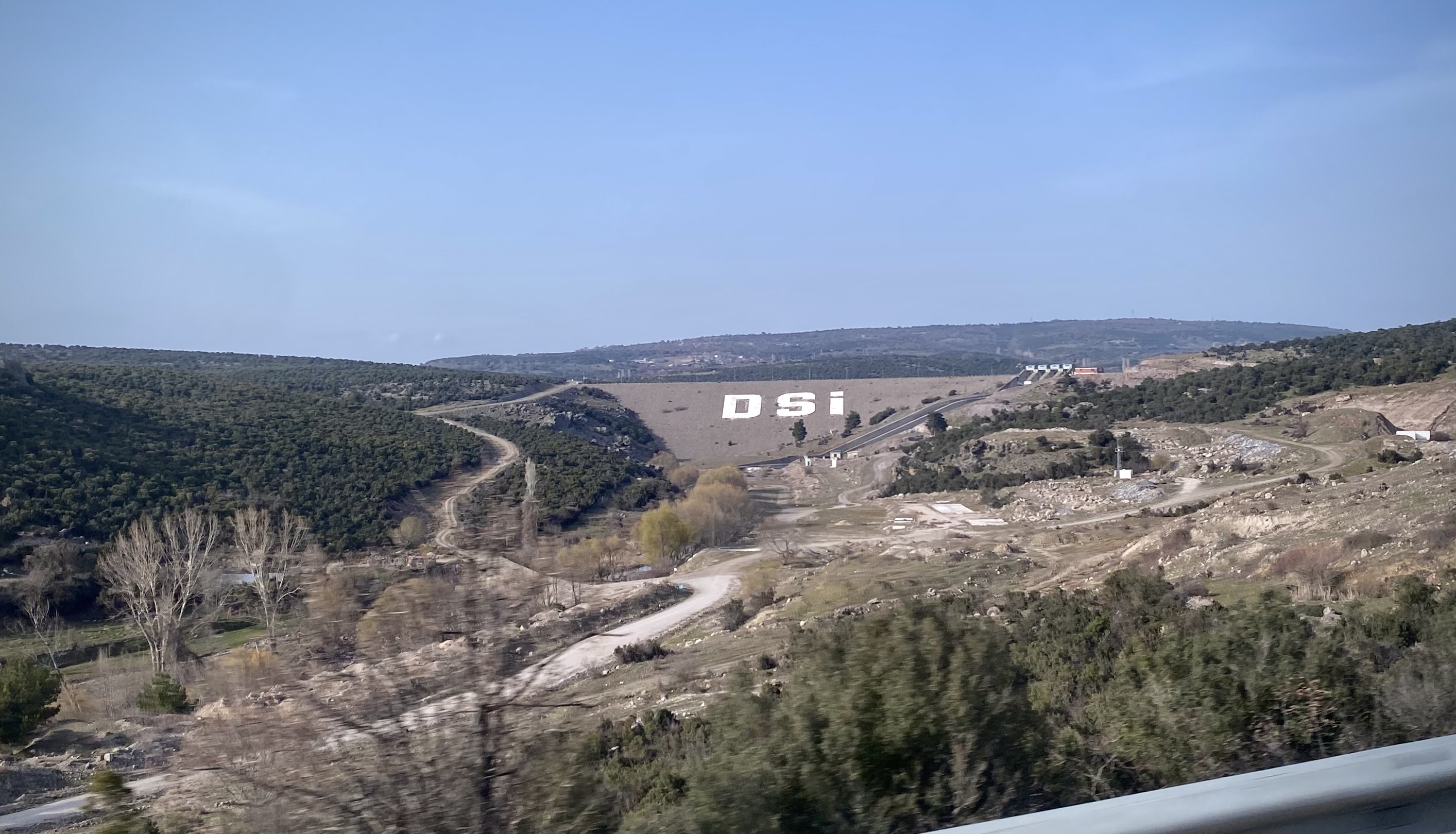
- Interactive map of Ayvacik Dam
- Location: Turkey
- Purpose: Irrigation and industrial water
- Status: Operational
- Construction began: 1997
- Opening date: 2007

Dam and spillways
- Type of dam: Embankment dam
- Height (foundation): 49 m
- Dam volume: 1,072,000 m³

Reservoir
- Total capacity: 39,000,000 m³
- Surface area: 3 km²

Ayvacık Dam is a dam in Çanakkale Province, Turkey, built between 1997 and 2007. It is currently still in use.

== See also ==
- List of dams and reservoirs in Turkey
