= Karacasu Dam =

- Location: Turkey
- Coordinates: 37°46′55″N 28°35′45″E

Karacasu Dam is a dam in Aydın Province, Turkey, completed in 2012. The development was backed by the Turkish State Hydraulic Works.

== See also ==
- List of dams and reservoirs in Turkey
