= Yalvaç Dam =

Coordinates: 38.36936°N 31.14062°E

- Interactive map of Yalvaç Dam
- Location: Yalvaç, Turkey

Yalvaç Dam is a dam in Turkey. The development was backed by the Turkish State Hydraulic Works.

== See also ==
- List of dams and reservoirs in Turkey
