= Tercan Dam =

- Location: Turkey
- Coordinates: 39.7516°N 40.4001°E
- Construction began: 1969
- Opening date: 1988

Dam and spillways
- Height: 65 m (213 ft)

Reservoir
- Total capacity: 178,000,000 m^{3} (144,307 acre⋅ft)

Power Station
- Installed capacity: 15 MW
- Annual generation: 51 GWh

Tercan Dam is an embankment dam on the Tuzla River in Erzincan Province, Turkey. Constructed between 1969 and 1988, the development was backed by the Turkish State Hydraulic Works. The dam has an installed capacity of 15 MW and provides water for the irrigation of 29,725 hectares (73,450 acres).

== See also ==
- List of dams and reservoirs in Turkey
