= Aşağıkaraören Reservoir =

- Official name: Aşağıkaraören Göleti
- Location: Kahramankazan, Ankara Province, Turkey
- Coordinates: 40.2726°N 32.7553°E
- Construction began: 1978
- Opening date: 1978

Dam and spillways
- Impounds: Kuzoğlu Creek
- Height: 15 m (49 ft)

Reservoir
- Total capacity: 0.213 hm^{3} (7,500,000 cu ft)
- Website www.dsi.gov.tr

Aşağıkaraören Reservoir (Turkish: Aşağıkaraören Göleti) is an artificial lake constructed in 1978 for irrigation purposes at Aşağı Karaören village of Kahramankazan district in Ankara Province, Turkey. It is fed by the Kuzoğlu Creek. The development was backed by the Turkish State Hydraulic Works.

== See also ==
- List of dams and reservoirs in Turkey
