= Gökçeada Dam =

Coordinates: 40.179°N 25.8666°E

- Location: Turkey

Gökçeada Dam is a dam in Turkey. The development was backed by the Turkish State Hydraulic Works.

== See also ==
- List of dams and reservoirs in Turkey
