= Akköprü Dam =

Dam in Muğla, Turkey

Coordinates: 36.8981°N 28.9022°E

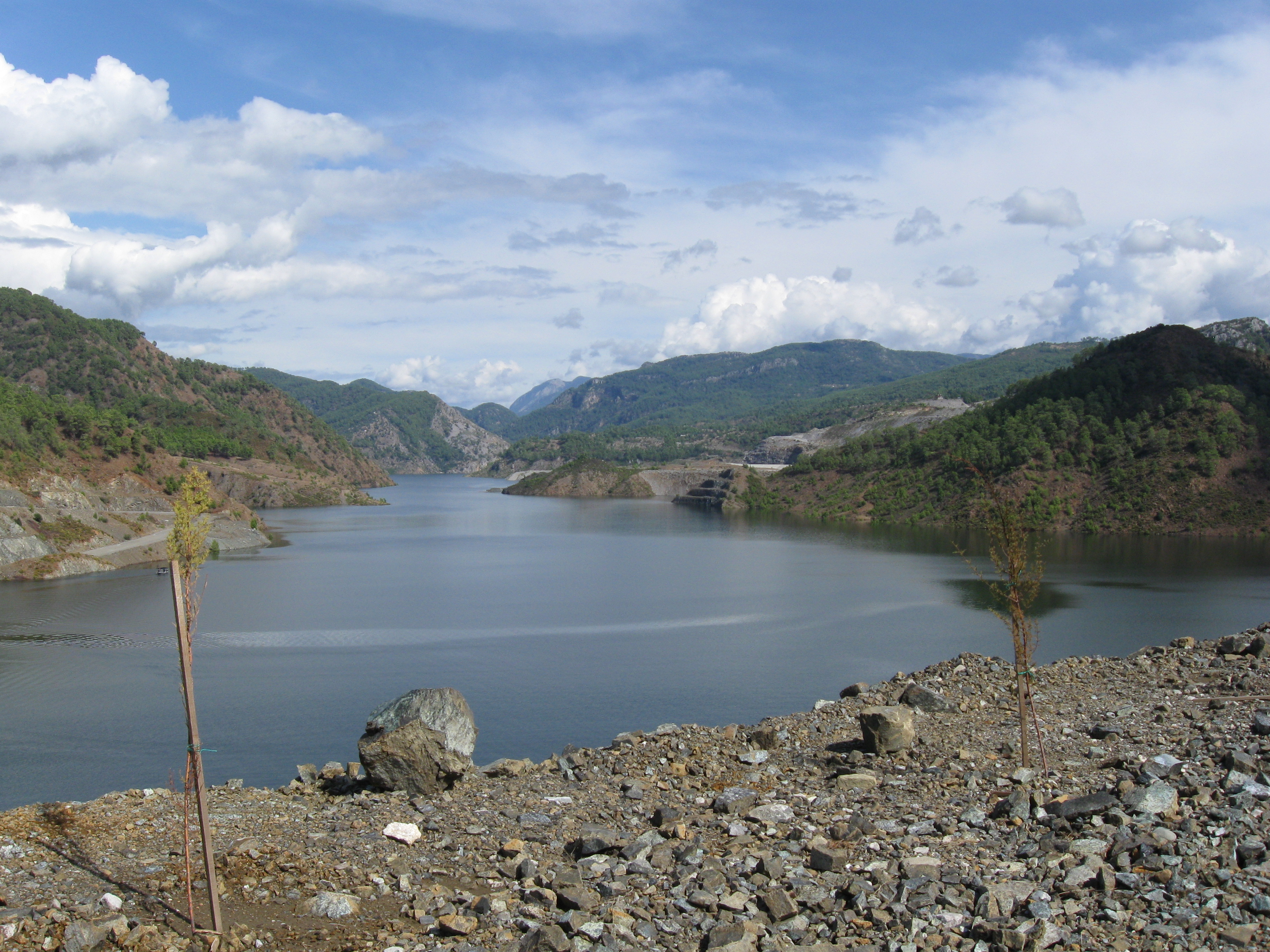
- The dam's reservoir
- Interactive map of Akköprü Dam
- Official name: Akköprü Baraji
- Country: Turkey
- Status: Operational
- Construction began: 1995
- Opening date: 2011
- Owner: DSI

Dam and spillways
- Type of dam: Rockfill
- Impounds: Dalaman River
- Height: 112 m (367 ft)
- Dam volume: 13,250,000 m^{3} (17,330,346 cu yd)

Reservoir
- Total capacity: 384,000,000 m^{3} (311,314 acre⋅ft)
- Surface area: 9 km^{2} (3 mi^{2})

Power Station
- Turbines: 2 x 57.5 MW Francis-type
- Installed capacity: 115 MW
- Annual generation: 343 GWh

Akköprü Dam is a rockfill on the Dalaman River in Muğla Province, Turkey, built between 1995 and 2011. It supports a 115 MW power station and provides water for the irrigation of 14,192 hectares (35,070 acres).

== See also ==
- List of dams and reservoirs in Turkey
