= Ayhanlar Dam =

- Interactive map of Ayhanlar Dam
- Location: Turkey
- Coordinates: 38.81325°N 34.72167°E

Ayhanlar Dam is a dam located in Nevşehir Province. The dam was built between 1996 and 2000 for irrigation purposes; it irrigates an area of 1773 hectares. Ayhanlar Dam is situated at an elevation of 1,015 meters, or 3,330 feet. It is one of many dams that have been built in Turkey as part of broader efforts to manage water resources, especially given the increasing pressures of climate change and regional water disputes.

== See also ==
- List of dams and reservoirs in Turkey
