= Havran Dam =

Dam reservoir in Turkey

Coordinates: 39°34′28″N 27°10′17″E

- Location: Balıkesir Province, Turkey

Havran Dam is a dam in the agricultural province of Balıkesir, Turkey. The development was backed by the Turkish State Hydraulic Works. A large cave located in the dam reservoir was home to 15–20,000 bats, making it the second largest such colony in the country. Because these creatures are important to the local agriculture, the pumping operation for the dam was delayed until April, 2008 when the bats ended their hibernation.

== See also ==
- List of dams and reservoirs in Turkey
