= Alakır Dam =

Coordinates: 36.4289°N 30.2376°E

Alakir Dam
- Interactive map of Alakir Dam
- Location: Turkey
- Purpose: Irrigation

Dam and spillways
- Height (thalweg): 44m

Alakır Dam (in Turkish, Alakır Barajı) is a dam in Antalya Province, Turkey, built between 1967 and 1971 (55 years ago). The dam creates a lake that is 4 km^{2} (1.5 sq mi) and irrigates 3,262 hectares (8,060 acres).

== See also ==
- List of dams and reservoirs in Turkey
