= Gürsöğüt Dam =

- Location within Turkey
- Interactive map of Gürsöğüt Dam
- Location: Turkey
- Coordinates: 39.89°N 31.785°E
- Construction began: 2000
- Opening date: 2009

Dam and spillways
- Impounds: Sakarya River
- Height: 130 m (427 ft)

Reservoir
- Total capacity: 103,000,000 m^{3} (83,503 acre⋅ft)
- Surface area: 30 km^{2} (12 mi^{2})

Power Station
- Installed capacity: 242 MW
- Annual generation: 276 GWh

Gürsöğüt Dam is a rock-fill embankment dam on the Sakarya River in Ankara Province, Turkey. The development was backed by the Turkish State Hydraulic Works. The primary purpose of the dam is hydroelectric power generation and it supports a 242 MW power station.

== See also ==
- List of dams and reservoirs in Turkey
