= Mumcular Dam =

- Location: Turkey
- Coordinates: 37.1175°N 27.6601°E

Mumcular Dam is a dam in Muğla Province, Turkey, built between 1986 and 1989. The development was backed by the Turkish State Hydraulic Works.

== See also ==
- List of dams and reservoirs in Turkey
