= Bahçelik Dam =

- Interactive map of Bahçelik Dam
- Location: Kayseri Province, Turkey
- Coordinates: 38.67644°N 36.29111°E
- Purpose: Irrigation, flood control, and freshwater
- Status: Operational
- Construction began: 1996
- Opening date: 2002

Dam and spillways
- Type of dam: Rockfill dam
- Impounds: Zamanti River
- Height: 65 m (213 ft)
- Height (foundation): 65 m
- Dam volume: 1,634,000 m^{3}

Reservoir
- Total capacity: 216,000,000 m^{3} (175,114 acre⋅ft)
- Surface area: 12 km^{2} (5 mi^{2})

Power Station
- Installed capacity: 7 MW
- Annual generation: 35 GWh

Bahçelik Dam is a rockfill dam on the Zamanti River in Kayseri Province, Turkey, built between 1996 and 2002. It is still in use.

== See also ==
- List of dams and reservoirs in Turkey
