= Alaca Dam =

Dam in Çorum, Turkey

- Official name: Alaca Barajı
- Country: Turkey
- Location: Çorum
- Coordinates: 40.1078°N 34.8384°E
- Purpose: Irrigation
- Construction began: 1979
- Opening date: 1984

Alaca Dam, or Alaca Barajı in Turkish, is a 57 meter (187 feet) high rockfill dam in Çorum Province, Turkey. It was built between 1979 and 1984. The dam is primarily used for irrigation purposes.

== See also ==
- List of dams and reservoirs in Turkey
