= Buldan Dam =

- Interactive map of Buldan Dam
- Official name: Buldan Baraji
- Country: Turkey
- Location: Buldan
- Coordinates: 38.1567°N 28.8436°E
- Purpose: Irrigation
- Status: Operational
- Construction began: 1962
- Opening date: 1967

Dam and spillways
- Type of dam: Embankment dam
- Impounds: Derbent River
- Elevation at crest: 59 m (194 ft)
- Dam volume: 600,000 m³ (780,000 cubic meters)

Reservoir
- Creates: Buldan Dam Lake
- Total capacity: 46 hm³ (46,000,000 m³)
- Surface area: 3.10 km² (1.20 mi²)

Buldan Dam is a dam located in Denizli Province, Turkey on the Derbent River. It was built from 1962 to 1967.

The dam is a rockfill and earth type dam with a volume of 600,000m^{3}. From the riverbed, it's height is approximately 59 meters and carries a reservoir volume of 46 hm³ and an area of 3.10 km² at regular water levels. It provides irrigation to an area of approximately 2,440 hectares.

== See also ==
- List of dams and reservoirs in Turkey
