= Çavdarhisar Dam =

Coordinates: 39.1759°N 29.5833°E

- Location: Kütahya Province, Turkey
- Purpose: Irrigation and industrial water
- Status: Operational
- Construction began: 1985
- Opening date: 1990

Dam and spillways
- Height (foundation): 51 meters
- Dam volume: 1,674,000 m³

Reservoir
- Surface area: 4 km²

Çavdarhisar Dam is a dam in Kütahya Province, Turkey, built between 1985 and 1990. The development was backed by the Turkish State Hydraulic Works. The dam has an irrigation area of 5,531 ha.

== See also ==
- List of dams and reservoirs in Turkey
