= Kurtboğazı Dam =

Coordinates: 40.2697°N 32.7006°E

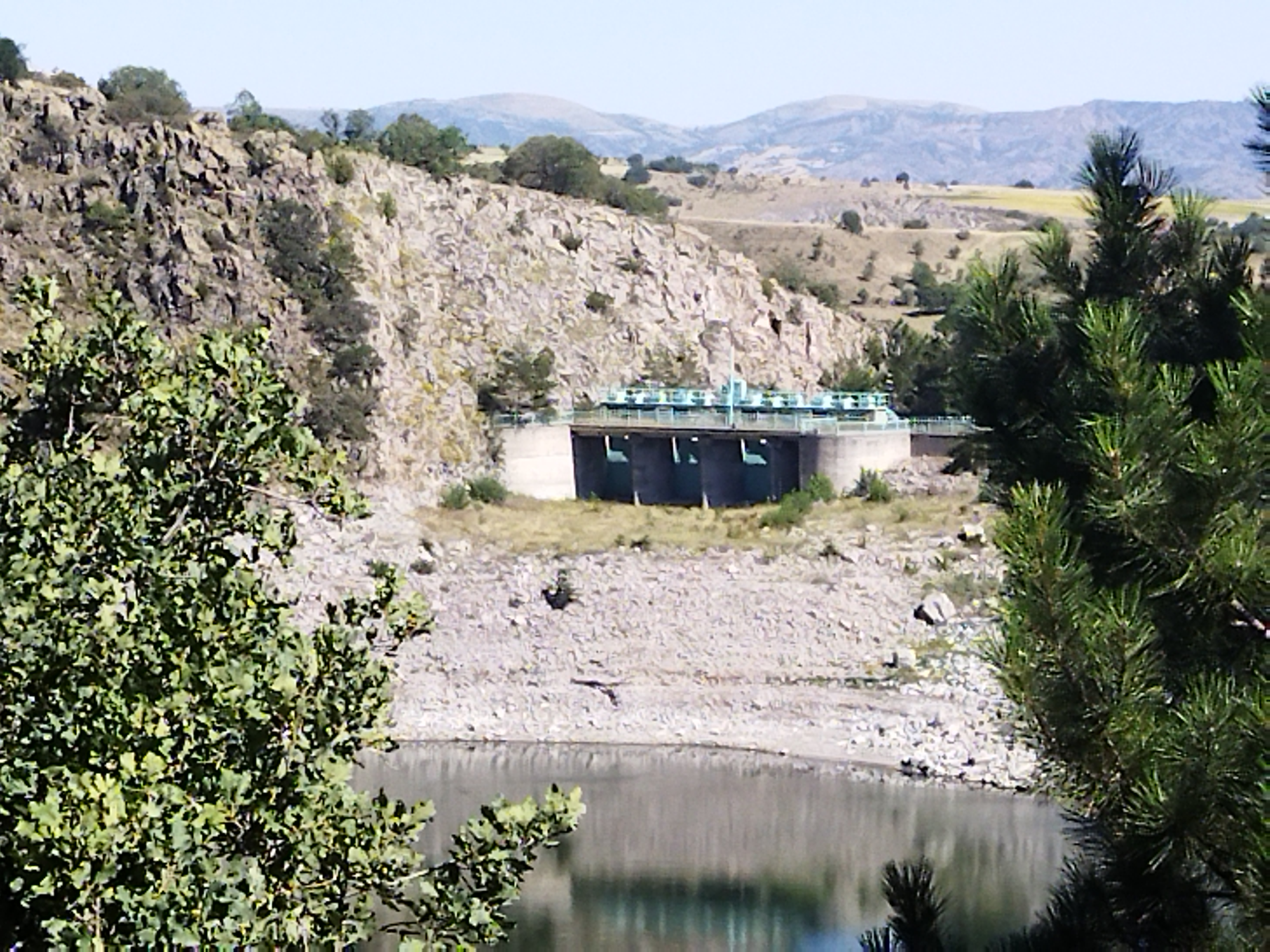
- View of Kurtboğazı Dam
- Location: Turkey, Ankara, Kazan
- Construction began: 1963

Kurtboğazı Dam is a dam in Ankara. The development was backed by the Turkish State Hydraulic Works. The dam built between 1963 and 1967 on the Kurtboğazı Stream in Ankara for the purpose of irrigation and drinking water supply. It provides irrigation service to an area of 3,780 hectares and provides 67 hm³ of drinking and utility water per year.

== Picnic Area ==
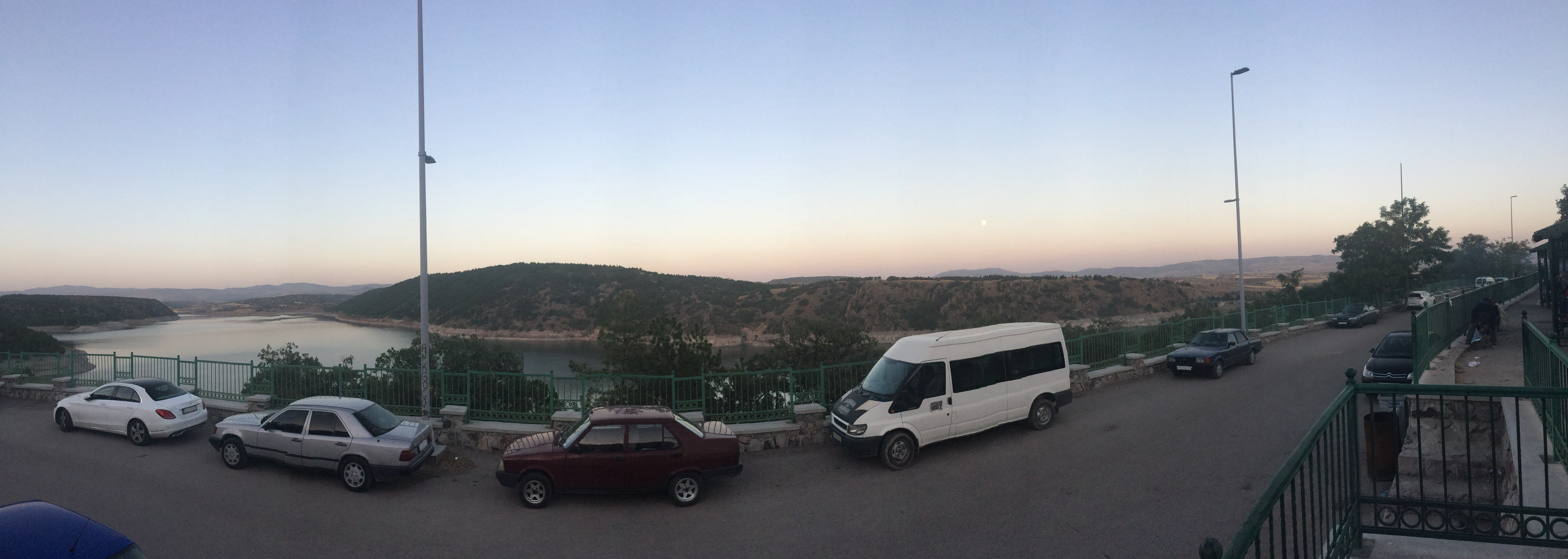
Panoramic view of Kurtboğazı Dam from picnic area.

There is also picnic area near the dam. Excursions and barbecue activities can be arranged in the area.

== See also ==
- List of dams and reservoirs in Turkey
