= Atikhisar Dam =

Coordinates: 40.1239°N 26.5234°E

- Interactive map of Atikhisar Dam
- Location: Turkey
- Construction began: 1971
- Opening date: 1976

Dam and spillways
- Impounds: Sarıçay River

Reservoir
- Total capacity: 52.5 million m^{3}
- Catchment area: 471 km^{2}
- Surface area: 4 km^{2}
- Maximum water depth: 61 m

Atikhisar Dam is a dam in Çanakkale Province, Turkey, built between 1971 and 1975 along the Sarıçay River. The dam became operational in 1976 to provide drinking water, irrigation, and flood control. The dam has a 471 km^{2} catchment area, a crest height of 68 m, and stretches 420 m in length. It can hold up to 52.5 million m^{3} of water. The surrounding region primarily supports agriculture, mining, rural communities, and transportation infrastructure.

== See also ==
- List of dams and reservoirs in Turkey
