= Hacıhıdır Dam =

Coordinates: 37.7134°N 39.1935°E

- Location: Turkey

Hacıhıdır Dam is a rock-filled dam in Turkey. The development was backed by the Turkish State Hydraulic Works.

== See also ==
- List of dams and reservoirs in Turkey
