= Karaçomak Dam =

- Location: Turkey
- Coordinates: 41.3185°N 33.7444°E
- Construction began: 1968
- Opening date: 1973

Karaçomak Dam is a dam in Kastamonu Province, Turkey, built between 1968 and 1973. The development was backed by the Turkish State Hydraulic Works. It is the main source of drinking water for Kastamonu, Turkey.

== See also ==
- List of dams and reservoirs in Turkey
