= Kaymaz Dam =

- Location: Turkey
- Coordinates: 39.543°N 31.2178°E

Kaymaz Dam is a dam in Turkey. The development was backed by the Turkish State Hydraulic Works.

== See also ==
- List of dams and reservoirs in Turkey
