= Süloğlu Dam =

- Location within Turkey
- Location: Turkey
- Coordinates: 41°47′40″N 26°55′33″E

Süloğlu Dam is a dam in Süloğlu district, Edirne Province, Turkey. The development was backed by the Turkish State Hydraulic Works and was built between 1975 and 1981.

== See also ==
- List of dams and reservoirs in Turkey
