= Murtaza Dam =

Dam in Niğde Province, Turkey

- Location: Turkey
- Coordinates: 38.1513°N 34.5819°E

Murtaza Dam is a dam in Turkey. The development was backed by the Turkish State Hydraulic Works.

== See also ==
- List of dams and reservoirs in Turkey
