= Yapraklı Dam =

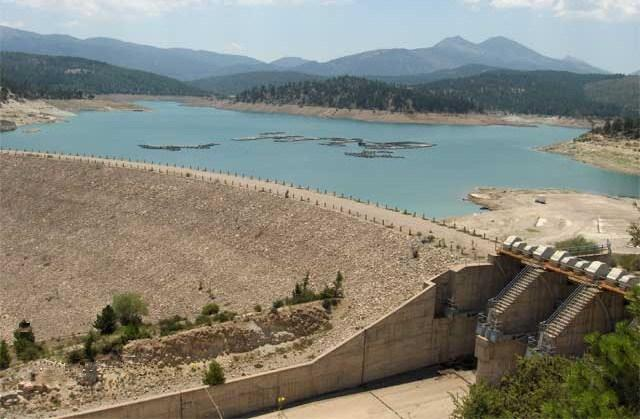
- Location: Turkey
- Coordinates: 37.0292°N 29.4539°E

Yapraklı Dam is a dam in Turkey. The development was backed by the Turkish State Hydraulic Works.

Yaprakli Dam is a soil dam built on the Horzum Creek between 1985 and 1991 and was constructed for irrigation purposes. The volume of the dam, is 1.631.000 m^{3} and the dam wall is 70 meters from the river bed. The lake volume at normal water level is 112.95 hm^{3}, the lake area at normal water level is 6.50 km^{2}. The dam provides irrigation services to an area of 19,576 hectares.

== See also ==
- List of dams and reservoirs in Turkey
