= Akhasan Dam =

Dam in Çankırı, Turkey

- Location within Turkey
- Official name: Akhasan Barajı
- Location: Çankırı Province, Turkey
- Coordinates: 40.77083°N 32.80528°E
- Construction began: 1996
- Opening date: 2010

Dam and spillways
- Impounds: Elma Creek
- Height: 36 m (118 ft)

Reservoir
- Total capacity: 16 hm^{3} (0.0038 mi^{3})
- Surface area: 1.56 km^{2} (0.60 mi^{2})

Power Station
- Operator: State Hydraulic Works (DSİ)

Akhasan Dam is an irrigation & industrial water dam and embankment dam in Çankırı Province, Turkey. The dam was constructed between 1996 and 2001. The dam is 48 metres high, has a retained water volume of 16,000,000 m^{3} and covers an irrigation area of 2,253 ha

== See also ==
- List of dams and reservoirs in Turkey
