= Kızılcapınar Dam =

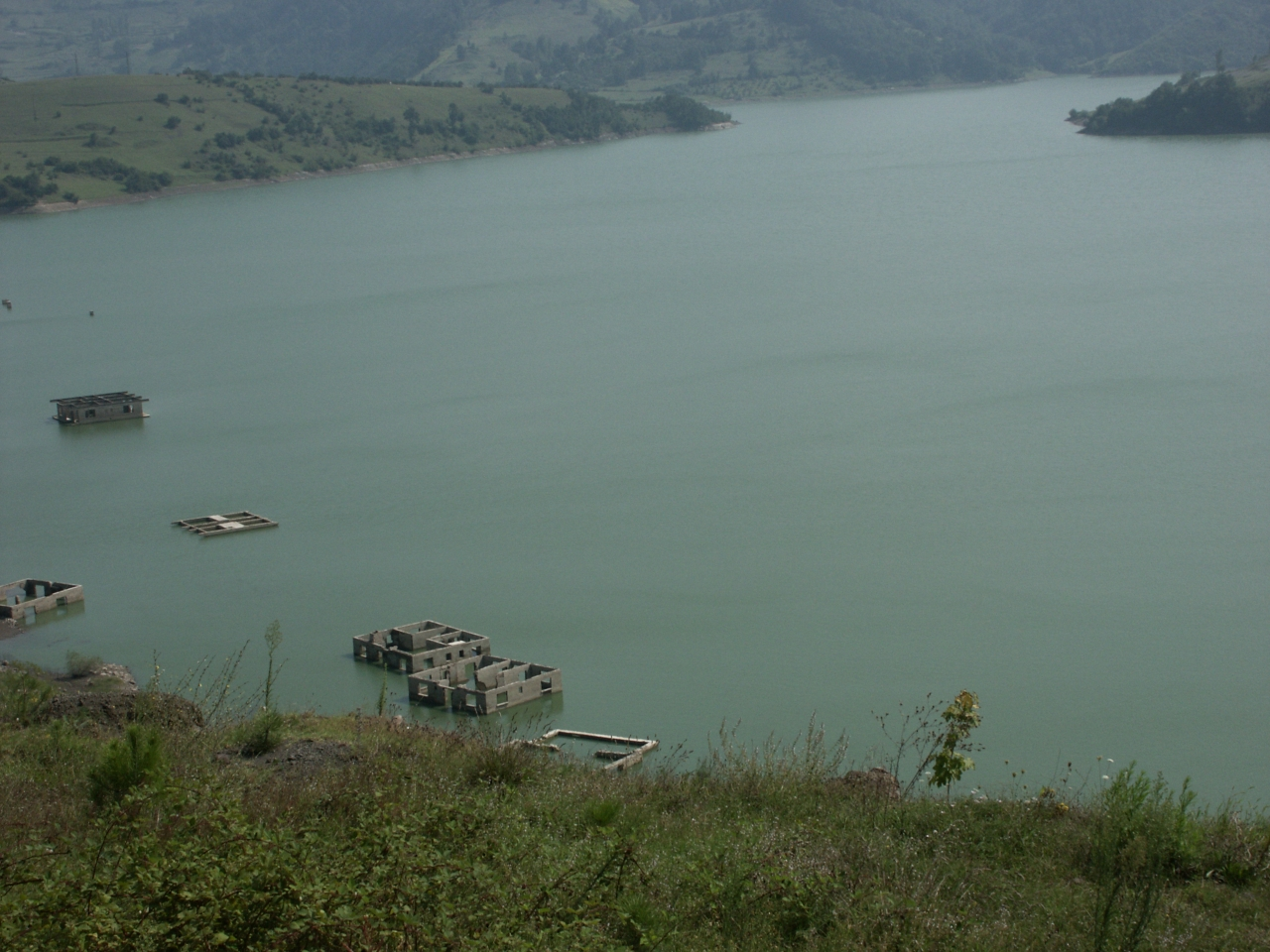
- Location: Turkey
- Coordinates: 41.2402°N 31.6159°E
- Status: Operational
- Construction began: 1991
- Opening date: 1994

Dam and spillways
- Type of dam: Rockfill dam
- Impounds: Kızlar River
- Height: 65 m (213 ft)

Reservoir
- Total capacity: 36,000,000 m^{3} (29,186 acre⋅ft)
- Surface area: 2 km^{2} (1 sq mi)

Power Station
- Installed capacity: 2 MW
- Annual generation: 9 GWh

Kızılcapınar Dam is a rockfill dam on the Kızlar River in Zonguldak Province, Turkey. The development was backed by the Turkish State Hydraulic Works. It was built between 1991 and 1994.

== See also ==
- List of dams and reservoirs in Turkey
