= Uzunlu Dam =

- Interactive map of Uzunlu Dam
- Location: Turkey
- Coordinates: 39.2555°N 35.4178°E

Uzunlu Dam is a dam in Turkey. The development was backed by the Turkish State Hydraulic Works.

== See also ==
- List of dams and reservoirs in Turkey
