= Pazaryolu Dam =

- Location: Turkey
- Coordinates: 40°24′17″N 40°46′44″E

Pazaryolu Dam is a dam in Turkey. The development was backed by the Turkish State Hydraulic Works.

== See also ==
- List of dams and reservoirs in Turkey
