= Gökçe Dam =

Coordinates: 40.5996°N 29.2025°E

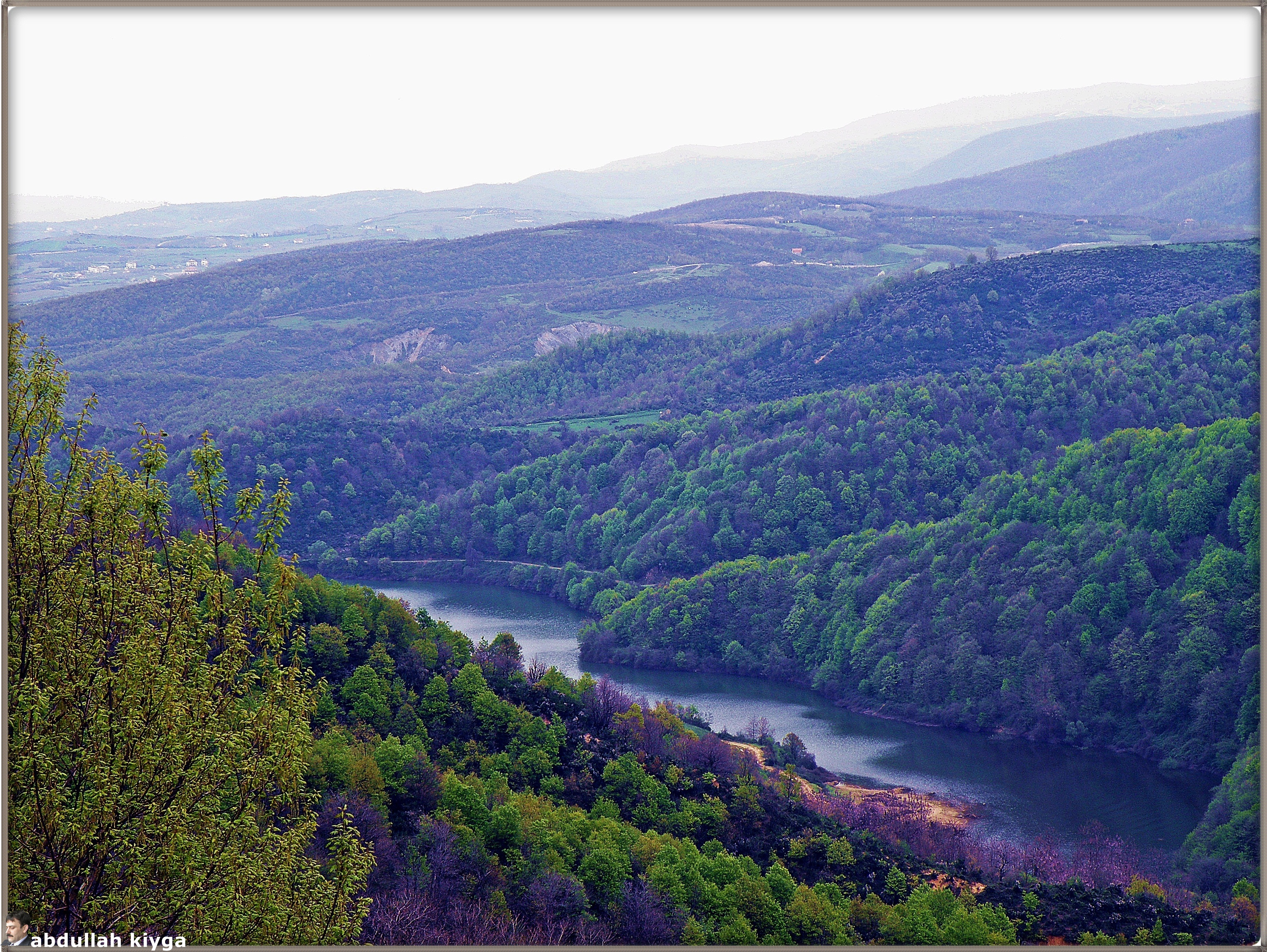
- Location: Turkey

Gökçe Dam is a dam in Turkey. The development was backed by the Turkish State Hydraulic Works.

== See also ==
- List of dams and reservoirs in Turkey
