= Demirözü Dam =

- Location within Turkey
- Interactive map of Demirözü Dam
- Location: Bayburt Province, Turkey
- Coordinates: 40°07′45″N 39°53′57″E
- Construction began: 1996
- Opening date: 2003

Demirözü Dam is a dam in Bayburt Province, Turkey, built between 1996 and 2003. The development was backed by the Turkish State Hydraulic Works.

== See also ==
- List of dams and reservoirs in Turkey
