= Bezirgan Dam =

- Interactive map of Bezirgan Dam
- Location: Turkey
- Coordinates: 41.3945°N 33.4070°E

Bezirgan Dam is a dam in Kastamonu Province, Turkey. It was built between 1995 and 2002.

== See also ==
- List of dams and reservoirs in Turkey
