= Sultanköy Dam =

- Location: Turkey
- Coordinates: 41.0372°N 26.4817°E

Sultanköy Dam is a dam in Turkey. The development was backed by the Turkish State Hydraulic Works.

== See also ==
- List of dams and reservoirs in Turkey
