= Gölköy Dam =

Coordinates: 40.6952°N 31.5325°E

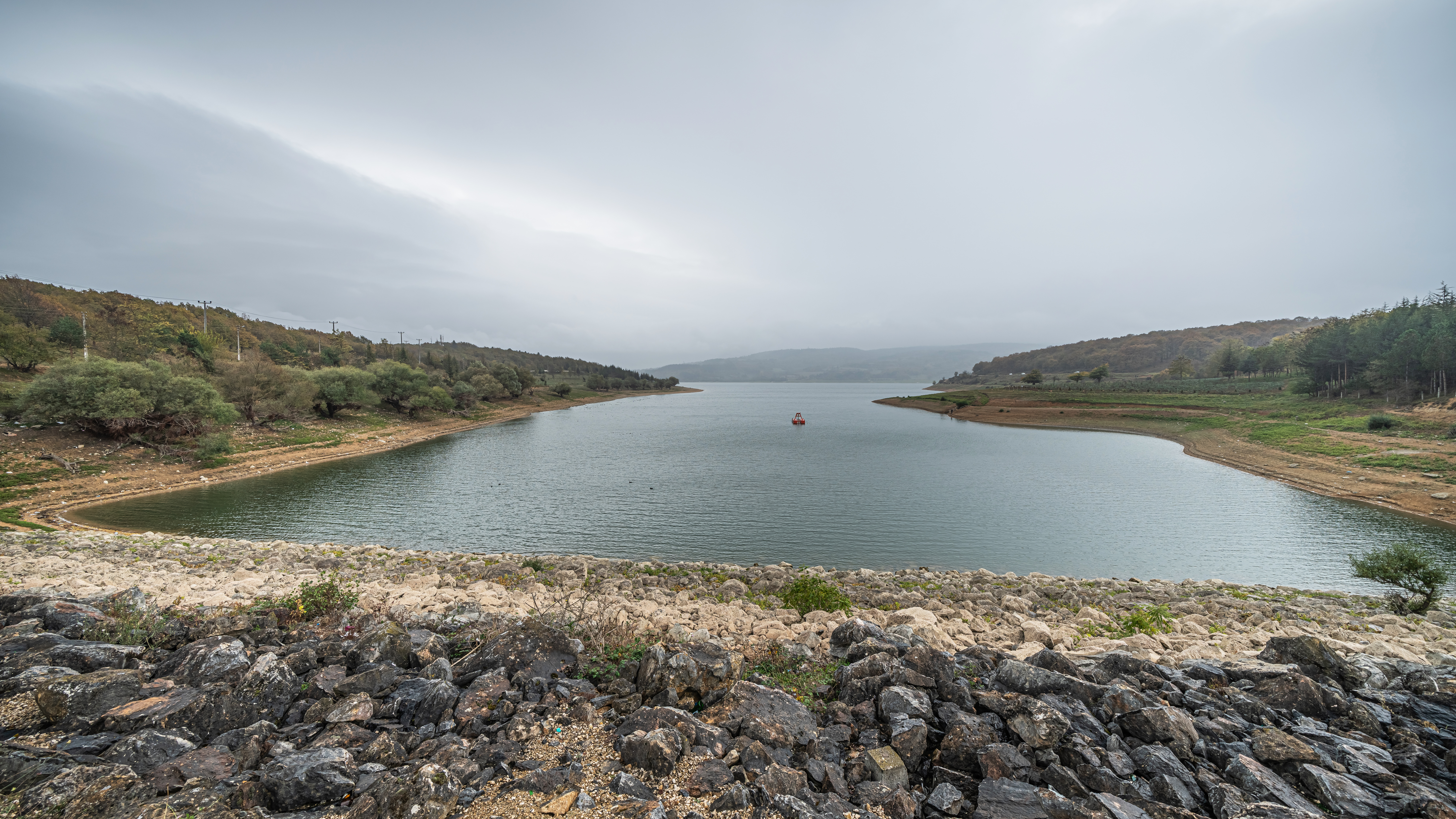
- Location: Turkey
- Construction began: 1965
- Opening date: 1970

Dam and spillways
- Height: 21.5 meters

Reservoir
- Surface area: 1.31 km2

Gölköy Dam is a dam in Bolu, Turkey, built between 1965 and 1970. The development was backed by the Turkish State Hydraulic Works.

== See also ==
- List of dams and reservoirs in Turkey
