= Topçam Dam (Aydın) =

- Location: Turkey
- Coordinates: 37.6898°N 28.0076°E

Topçam Dam (Aydın) is a dam in Aydın Province, Turkey, built between 1977 and 1984. The development was backed by the Turkish State Hydraulic Works.

== See also ==
- List of dams and reservoirs in Turkey
