= Alpu Dam =

Coordinates: 40°03′42″N 36°06′01″E

- Location: Tokat Province, Turkey
- Construction began: 1998
- Opening date: 2002

Dam and spillways
- Impounds: Alpu Creek
- Height: 60 m (200 ft)
- Dam volume: 1,790 dam^{3} (63,000,000 ft^{3})

Reservoir
- Total capacity: 19.38 hm^{3} (0.00465 mi^{3})
- Surface area: 1.10 km^{2} (0.42 mi^{2})
- Website www.alpu_dam

Alpu Dam (Turkish: Alpu Barajı) is a dam in Tokat Province, Turkey, built between 1998 and 2002. It crosses Alpu Creek, and has an irrigation area of 319 ha.

== See also ==
- List of dams and reservoirs in Turkey
