= Sarımehmet Dam =

- Location: Turkey
- Coordinates: 38.7924°N 43.7437°E

Sarımehmet Dam is a dam in Turkey. The development was backed by the Turkish State Hydraulic Works.

== See also ==
- List of dams and reservoirs in Turkey
