= Akgedik Dam =

Dam in Muğla, Turkey

Coordinates: 37.3301°N 27.8193°E

- Purpose: Irrigation
- Construction began: 1995

Dam and spillways
- Height (thalweg): 48 metres (157 ft)

Reservoir
- Surface area: 1.45 km^{2}

Akgedik Dam is a dam in Muğla Province, Turkey, built from 1995 to 2008.

== See also ==
- List of dams and reservoirs in Turkey
