= Karacaören-2 Dam =

- Location: Turkey
- Coordinates: 37.3067°N 30.8088°E

Power Station
- Installed capacity: 47 MW
- Annual generation: 206 GWh

Karacaören-2 Dam is a dam in Turkey. The development was backed by the Turkish State Hydraulic Works.

== See also ==
- List of dams and reservoirs in Turkey
