= Taşoluk Dam =

- Location: Turkey
- Coordinates: 40.1967°N 27.354°E

Taşoluk Dam is a dam in Turkey. The development was backed by the Turkish State Hydraulic Works.

== See also ==
- List of dams and reservoirs in Turkey
