= Kureyşler Dam =

- Interactive map of Kureyşler Dam
- Location: Turkey

Kureyşler Dam is a dam in Kütahya Province, Turkey, built between 1993 and 2001. The development was backed by the Turkish State Hydraulic Works.

== See also ==
- List of dams and reservoirs in Turkey
