= Yaylakavak Dam =

- Location: Turkey
- Coordinates: 37.5755°N 27.8055°E

Yaylakavak Dam is a dam in Aydın Province, Turkey, built between 1991 and 1996. The development was backed by the Turkish State Hydraulic Works.

== See also ==
- List of dams and reservoirs in Turkey
