= Tahtaköprü Dam =

- Location: Turkey
- Coordinates: 36.8564°N 36.688°E

Tahtaköprü Dam is a dam in Turkey. The development was backed by the Turkish State Hydraulic Works.

== See also ==
- List of dams and reservoirs in Turkey
