= Hatap Dam =

- Interactive map of Hatap Dam
- Location: Turkey
- Construction began: 1995
- Opening date: 2001

Hatap Dam is a dam in Çorum Province, Turkey, built between 1995 and 2001. The development was backed by the Turkish State Hydraulic Works.

== See also ==
- List of dams and reservoirs in Turkey
