= Bayındır Dam =

Coordinates: 39.9147°N 32.9927°E

Bayindir Dam
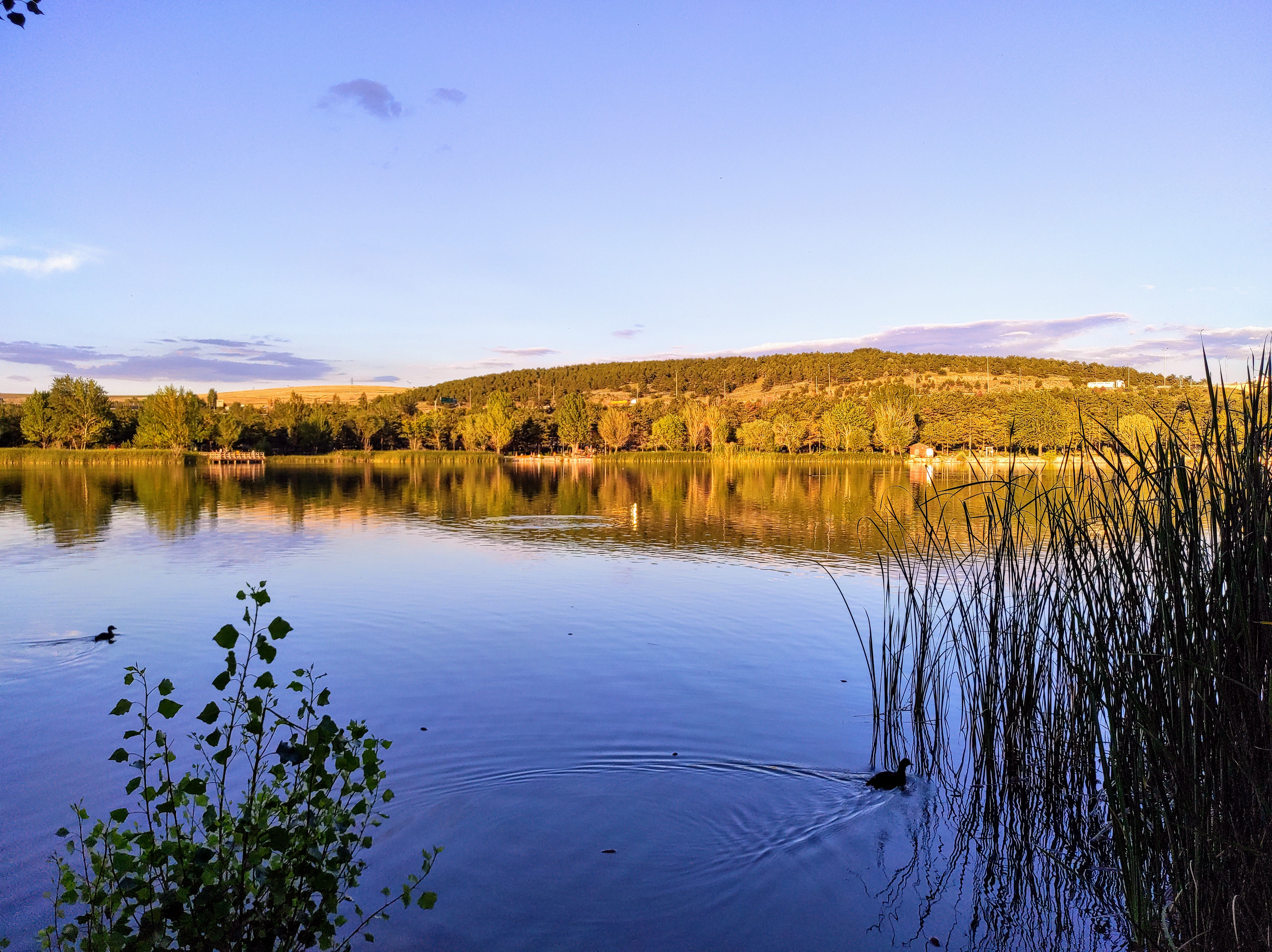
- Interactive map of Bayindir Dam
- Location: Turkey

Bayındır Dam is a dam in Ankara Province, Turkey, built between 1962 and 1965.

== See also ==
- List of dams and reservoirs in Turkey
