= Onaç-2 Dam =

- Location: Turkey
- Coordinates: 37.4913°N 30.5693°E

Onaç-2 Dam is a dam in Turkey. The development was backed by the Turkish State Hydraulic Works.

== See also ==
- List of dams and reservoirs in Turkey
