= Kartalkaya Dam =

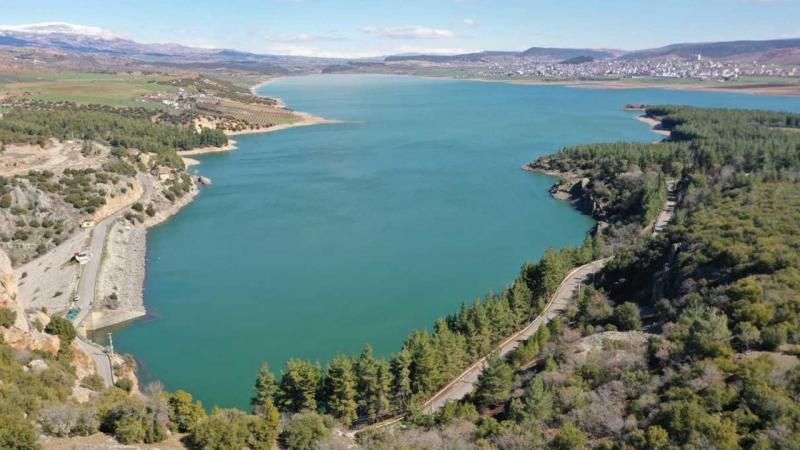

- Location within Turkey
- Interactive map of Kartalkaya Dam
- Location: Turkey
- Coordinates: 37.4688°N 37.2394°E

Kartalkaya Dam is a dam in Turkey. The development was backed by the Turkish State Hydraulic Works.

== See also ==
- List of dams and reservoirs in Turkey
