= Yenihayat Dam =

- Location: Turkey
- Coordinates: 40.3927°N 34.6671°E
- Construction began: 1990
- Opening date: 1998

Yenihayat Dam is a dam in Çorum Province, Turkey, built between 1990 and 1998. The development was backed by the Turkish State Hydraulic Works.

== See also ==
- List of dams and reservoirs in Turkey
