= İkizdere Dam =

Coordinates: 37.8894°N 27.7398°E

- Location: Turkey

İkizdere Dam is a dam in Aydın Province, Turkey, which began construction in 1999. The development was backed by the Turkish State Hydraulic Works.

== See also ==
- List of dams and reservoirs in Turkey
