= Madra Dam =

- Location: Turkey
- Coordinates: 39.2371°N 26.8433°E

Madra Dam is a dam in Turkey. The development was backed by the Turkish State Hydraulic Works.

== See also ==
- List of dams and reservoirs in Turkey
