= Geyik Dam =

Coordinates: 37.3823°N 27.8885°E

- Location: Turkey

Geyik Dam is a dam in Muğla Province, Turkey, built between 1986 and 1988 by the State Hydraulic Works.

== See also ==
- List of dams and reservoirs in Turkey
