= Uluköy Dam =

- Location: Turkey
- Coordinates: 40.7787°N 36.3944°E
- Construction began: 1977
- Opening date: 1983

Uluköy Dam is a dam in Amasya Province, Turkey, built between 1977 and 1983. The development was backed by the Turkish State Hydraulic Works.

== See also ==
- List of dams and reservoirs in Turkey
