= Tayfur Dam =

- Location: Turkey
- Coordinates: 40.3845°N 26.4874°E

Tayfur Dam is a dam on the Tayfur Çayı river in Turkey. The development was backed by the Turkish State Hydraulic Works.

== See also ==
- List of dams and reservoirs in Turkey
