= Günyurdu Dam =

Coordinates: 40.0310°N 29.8538°E

- Location: Turkey

Günyurdu Dam is a dam in Turkey. The development was backed by the Turkish State Hydraulic Works.

== See also ==
- List of dams and reservoirs in Turkey
