= Alaçatı Dam =

Dam in İzmir, Turkey

- Location within Turkey
- Interactive map of Alaçatı Dam
- Location: İzmir, Turkey
- Coordinates: 38.282665°N 26.405771°E
- Purpose: Freshwater
- Status: Operational
- Construction began: 1994
- Opening date: 1997

Dam and spillways
- Type of dam: Earth fill dam
- Impounds: Hirsizdere river
- Height: 18 m (59 ft)
- Dam volume: 250,000 m^{3}

Reservoir
- Total capacity: 16.6 MCM
- Surface area: 255 ha

The Alaçatı Dam is a dam in İzmir Province, Turkey, built between 1994 and 1997. It is still in use.

== See also ==
- List of dams and reservoirs in Turkey
