= İvriz Dam =

Coordinates: 37.4457°N 34.1598°E

- Location: Turkey

Power Station
- Installed capacity: 1.2 MW (max)
- Annual generation: 4 GWh

İvriz Dam is a dam in Turkey. The development was backed by the Turkish State Hydraulic Works.

== See also ==
- List of dams and reservoirs in Turkey
