= Çamlıdere Dam =

Coordinates: 40.388°N 32.3824°E

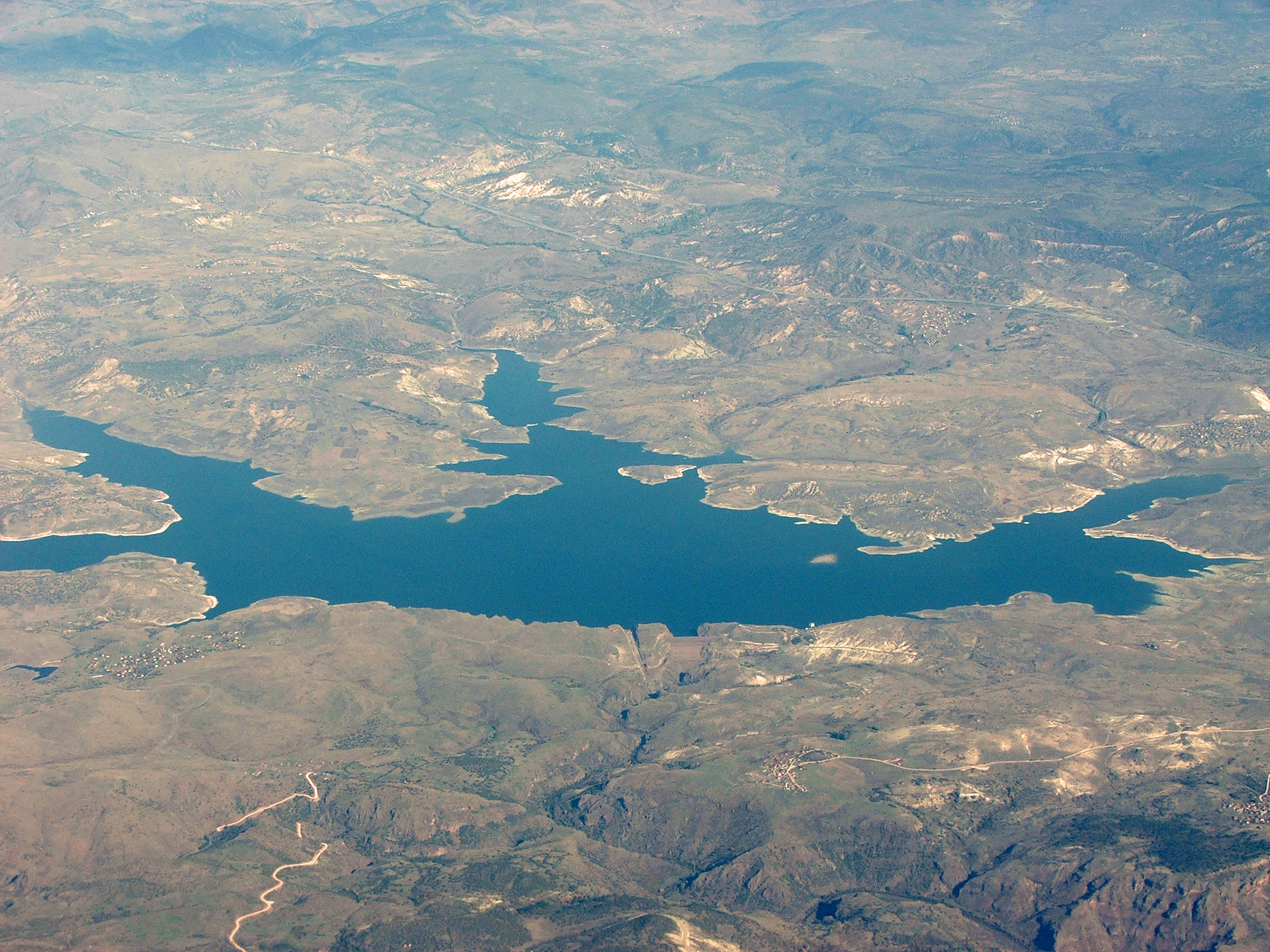
- Location: Turkey
- Opening date: 1987

Çamlıdere Dam is a dam in Turkey. The basin measures 753.4 km^{2} and is the primary source of drinkable water for the city of Ankara.

== See also ==
- List of dams and reservoirs in Turkey
