= Ataköy Dam =

Coordinates: 40.4251°N 36.8818°E

- Interactive map of Ataköy Dam
- Location: Turkey

Dam and spillways
- Type of dam: Earth fill dam
- Dam volume: 600,000 meters squared

Ataköy Dam is a dam in Tokat Province, Turkey, built between 1975 and 1977. It is an earth-fill dam, and serves as a way to produce hydroelectric power. The dam is still in use.

== See also ==
- List of dams and reservoirs in Turkey
