= Çakmak Dam (Edirne) =

Coordinates: 41.1096°N 36.6335°E

- Interactive map of Çakmak Dam
- Location: Turkey

Çakmak Dam is a dam in Turkey. The development was backed by the Turkish State Hydraulic Works.

== See also ==
- List of dams and reservoirs in Turkey
