= Manyas Dam =

- Location: Turkey
- Coordinates: 39.9751°N 27.7811°E

Manyas Dam is a dam in Turkey. The development was backed by the Turkish State Hydraulic Works.

== See also ==
- List of dams and reservoirs in Turkey
