= Bayramdere Dam =

Coordinates: 40°20′12″N 26°48′35″E

- Interactive map of Bayramdere Dam
- Location: Çanakkale Province, Turkey
- Construction began: 1999
- Opening date: 2002

Dam and spillways
- Impounds: Karanlık Canyon
- Height: 60 metres (200 ft)

Bayramdere Dam is a dam in Çanakkale Province, Turkey. It was built between 1999 and 2002.

== See also ==
- List of dams and reservoirs in Turkey
