= Sevişler Dam =

- Location: Turkey
- Coordinates: 39.2622°N 27.554°E

Sevişler Dam is a dam in Manisa Province, Turkey, built between 1977 and 1981. The development was backed by the Turkish State Hydraulic Works.

== See also ==
- List of dams and reservoirs in Turkey
