= Yenidere Dam =

Coordinates: 37.6063°N 28.8982°E

- Interactive map of Yenidere Dam
- Location: Turkey

Yenidere Dam is a dam in Denizli Province, Turkey, which began construction in 1995. The development was backed by the Turkish State Hydraulic Works.

== See also ==
- List of dams and reservoirs in Turkey
