= Kayalıköy Dam =

Coordinates: 41.788065°N 27.134990°E

- Location: Turkey

Kayalıköy Dam is a dam in Turkey, situated between Kocataş Tepesi, Kayalı and Eriklice. The development was backed by the Turkish State Hydraulic Works.

== See also ==
- List of dams and reservoirs in Turkey
