= Çaygören Dam =

Coordinates: 39.2709°N 28.2188°E

- Location: Balikesir, Turkey
- Purpose: Irrigation, industrial water, flood-control
- Status: Operational
- Construction began: 1965
- Opening date: 1968

Dam and spillways
- Type of dam: Earth fill dam
- Height (foundation): 52 meters
- Dam volume: 3,412,000 m³

Reservoir
- Catchment area: 130,000,000 m³
- Surface area: 7 km²

Çaygören Dam is a dam in Balikesir, Turkey. The development was backed by the Turkish State Hydraulic Works. The construction lasted from 1965 to 1968.

== See also ==
- List of dams and reservoirs in Turkey
