= Kayaboğazı Dam =

- Location: Turkey
- Coordinates: 39.4168°N 29.617°E

Kayaboğazı Dam is a dam in Kütahya Province, Turkey, built between 1976 and 1987. The development was backed by the Turkish State Hydraulic Works.

== See also ==
- List of dams and reservoirs in Turkey
