= Ayvalı Dam =

Ayvali Dam
- Location within Turkey
- Location: Turkey
- Coordinates: 37°34′37.12″N 37°8′14.05″E
- Construction began: 1995
- Opening date: 2005

Dam and spillways
- Height: 103 m (338 ft)

Ayvalı Dam is a dam in Kahramanmaraş Province, Turkey, built between 1995 and 2005. It is 76 meters high, and has a water surface area of 3 km².

== See also ==
- List of dams and reservoirs in Turkey
