= Kırklareli Dam =

Kırklareli Reservoir
- Location: Kırklareli, Turkey
- Coordinates: 41.7392°N 27.2794°E
- Status: Operational
- Construction began: 1985
- Opening date: 1998

Dam and spillways
- Dam volume: 1,838,000 m³

Reservoir
- Total capacity: 112,000,000 m³
- Surface area: 6 km²

Kırklareli Reservoir is a reservoir in Turkey. The development was backed by the Turkish State Hydraulic Works. The dam does flood control, produces fresh water, provides irrigation and industrial water to the surrounding area.

== See also ==
- List of dams and reservoirs in Turkey
