= May Dam =

- Location: Turkey
- Coordinates: 37.5086°N 32.5649°E

May Dam is a dam in Turkey. The development was backed by the Turkish State Hydraulic Works.

== See also ==
- List of dams and reservoirs in Turkey
