= Afşar Dam =

Dam in Manisa Province, Turkey

Coordinates: 38.2461°N 28.6032°E

Afşar Dam is a dam in Manisa Province, Turkey, built between 1973 and 1977. The dam creates a lake which is 5.25 km ² and irrigates 13,500 hectares.

== See also ==
- List of dams and reservoirs in Turkey
