= Demirtaş Dam =

Coordinates: 40.288°N 29.1141°E

- Location: Turkey

Demirtaş Dam is a dam in Turkey. It was built in 1982 and commissioned in 1983.

The development was backed by the Turkish State Hydraulic Works.

== See also ==
- List of dams and reservoirs in Turkey
