= Kadıköy Dam =

- Location: Turkey
- Coordinates: 40.7938°N 26.7739°E

Kadıköy Dam is a dam in Turkey. The development was backed by the Turkish State Hydraulic Works.

== See also ==
- List of dams and reservoirs in Turkey
