= Mehmetli Dam =

- Location: Turkey
- Coordinates: 37.5075°N 36.021°E

Mehmetli Dam is a dam in Turkey. The development was backed by the Turkish State Hydraulic Works.

== See also ==
- List of dams and reservoirs in Turkey
