= Karamanlı Dam =

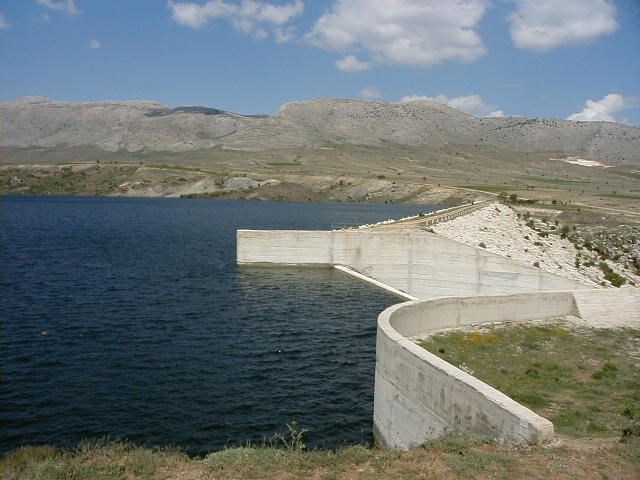
- Interactive map of Karamanlı Dam
- Location: Turkey

Karamanlı Dam is a dam in Turkey. The development was backed by the Turkish State Hydraulic Works.

== See also ==
- List of dams and reservoirs in Turkey
