= Gönen Dam =

Coordinates: 39.9695°N 27.444°E

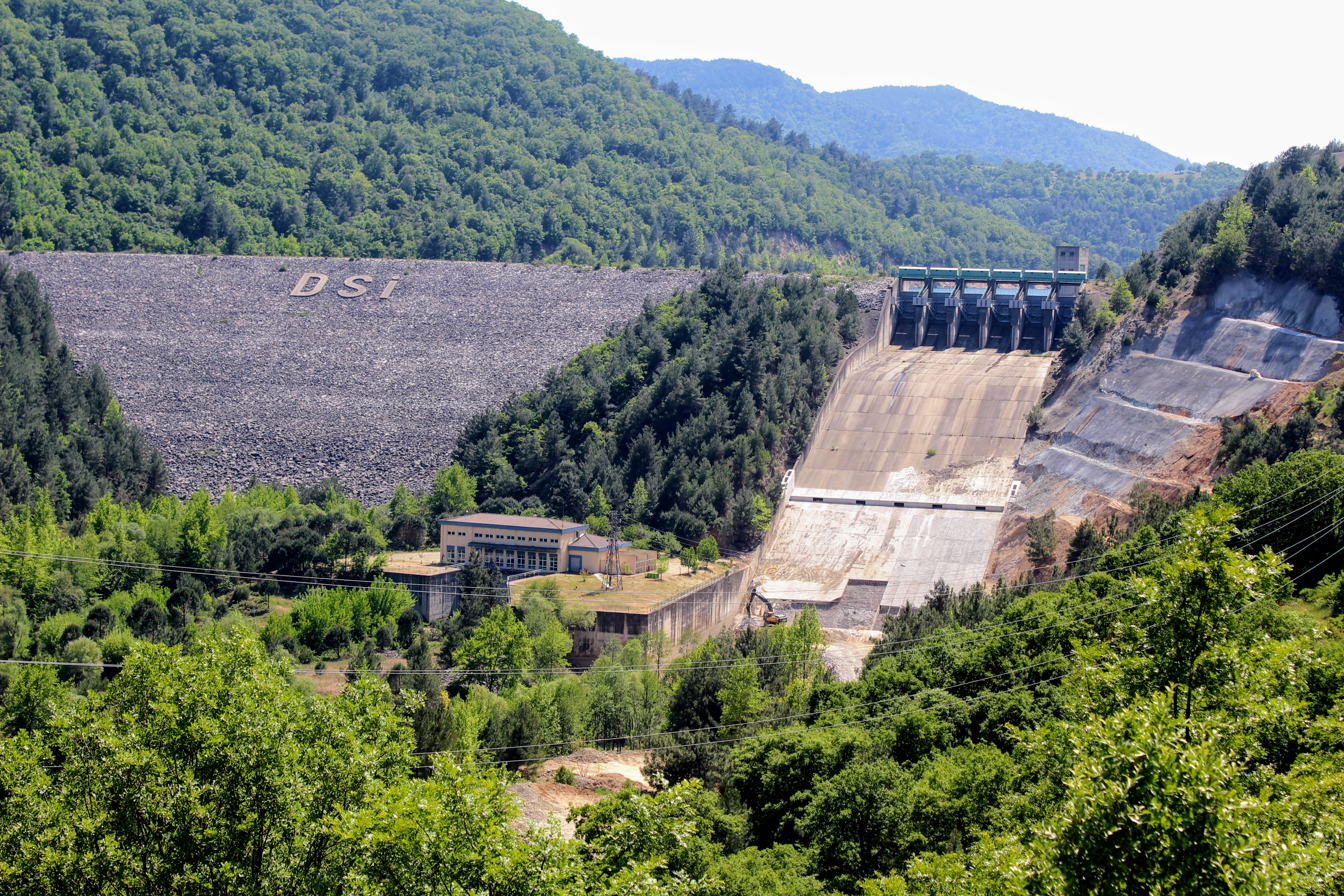
- Location: Turkey

Power Station
- Commission date: 1998
- Turbines: 2 x 5.7 MW Francis-type
- Installed capacity: 11 MW
- Annual generation: 47 GWh

Gönen Dam is a dam in Turkey. The development was backed by the Turkish State Hydraulic Works.

== See also ==
- List of dams and reservoirs in Turkey
