= İbrala Dam =

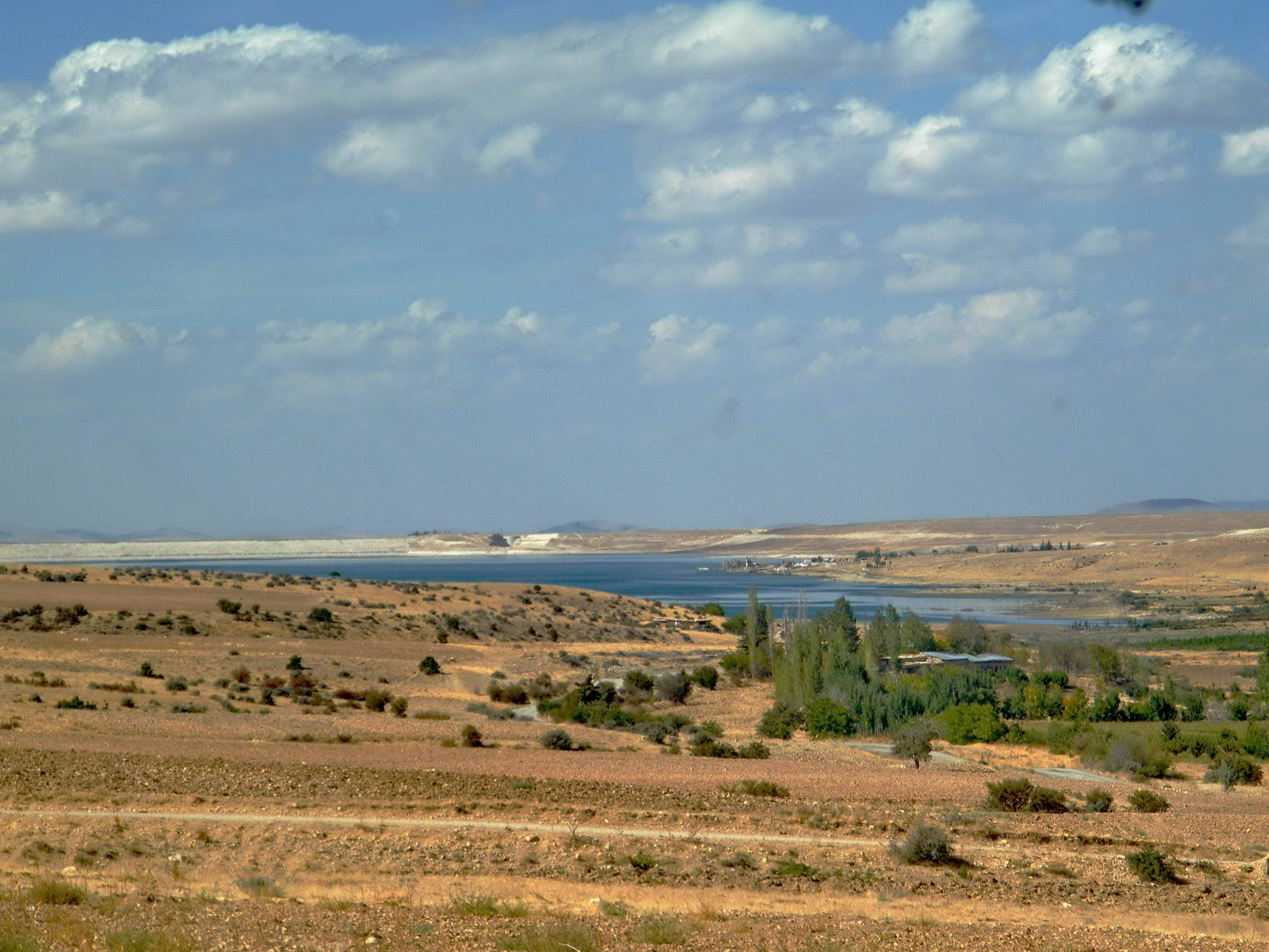

- Location within Turkey
- Interactive map of İbrala Dam
- Location: Turkey
- Coordinates: 37°13′01″N 33°23′45″E

İbrala Dam is a dam in Turkey. The development was backed by the Turkish State Hydraulic Works.

== See also ==
- List of dams and reservoirs in Turkey
