= Hancağız Dam =

Coordinates: 36.9577°N 37.888°E

- Location: Turkey

Hancağız Dam is a dam in Turkey. The development was backed by the Turkish State Hydraulic Works.

== See also ==
- List of dams and reservoirs in Turkey
