= Demirdöven Dam =

Coordinates: 40.0396°N 41.7365°E

- Location: Turkey

Demirdöven Dam is a dam in Turkey. The development was backed by the Turkish State Hydraulic Works. It was completed in 1995.

== See also ==
- List of dams and reservoirs in Turkey
