= Musaözü Dam =

- Location: Turkey
- Coordinates: 39.6972°N 30.3238°E

Musaözü Dam is a dam in Turkey. The development was backed by the Turkish State Hydraulic Works.

== See also ==
- List of dams and reservoirs in Turkey
