= Asartepe Dam =

Coordinates: 40.1448°N 32.3863°E

- Interactive map of Asartepe Dam
- Location: Turkey

Asartepe Dam is an earthfill dam in Ankara Province, Turkey, built between 1975 and 1980. Its retained water volume is about 20,000,000 cubic meters and it has a volume of 408,000 cubic meters.

== See also ==
- List of dams and reservoirs in Turkey
