= Çokal Dam =

Coordinates: 40.686°N 27.0088°E

- Location: Turkey

Çokal Dam is a dam located in Turkey. The development was backed by the Turkish State Hydraulic Works. It was built from 1997 to 2002, and it is currently still in use as of 2024.

== See also ==
- List of dams and reservoirs in Turkey
