= Altınyazı Dam =

Coordinates: 41.0793°N 26.5878°E

Altinyazi Dam
- Interactive map of Altinyazi Dam
- Location: Edirne Province, Turkey
- Status: Operational
- Construction began: 1965
- Opening date: 1970

Dam and spillways
- Type of dam: Earth fill dam
- Height (foundation): 21.5 meters
- Dam volume: 524,000 m³

Reservoir
- Catchment area: 31,000,000 m³
- Surface area: 4 km²

Altınyazı Dam is a dam in Edirne Province, Turkey, built between 1965 and 1970. It is used for irrigation and flood control, and also functions as an industrial water dam.

== See also ==
- List of dams and reservoirs in Turkey
