= İmranlı Dam =

Coordinates: 39.8804°N 38.1663°E

- Location: Turkey

Dam and spillways
- Impounds: Kızılırmak River

İmranlı Dam is a dam in Turkey on the Kızılırmak. The development was backed by the Turkish State Hydraulic Works.

== See also ==
- List of dams and reservoirs in Turkey
