= Mursal Dam =

- Location: Sivas, Turkey
- Coordinates: 39.1433°N 37.9815°E
- Construction began: 1986
- Opening date: 1992

Dam and spillways
- Height: 59 meters

Reservoir
- Surface area: 1 km²

Mursal Dam is an irrigation and industrial water dam in Sivas, Turkey. The development was backed by the Turkish State Hydraulic Works. The dam was initiated in 1986 and completed in 1992. The Mursal dam is constructed of earth and rockfill. The plant is hydroelectric.

== See also ==
- List of dams and reservoirs in Turkey
