= Karaidemir Dam =

- Location: Turkey
- Coordinates: 40.954°N 27.0069°E

Karaidemir Dam is a dam located in the Thrace region of Turkey. The development was backed by the Turkish State Hydraulic Works.

== Water quality ==
The water in the Karaidemir Dam lake is moderately salty, and can be used for irrigation, but not on stenohaline plants.

== See also ==
- List of dams and reservoirs in Turkey
