= Yayladağ Dam =

Yayladağı Dam
- Interactive map of Yayladağı Dam
- Location: Hatay Province, Turkey
- Coordinates: 35.9451°N 36.0602°E

Dam and spillways
- Height: 47 m (154 ft)

Yayladağı Dam is a dam in Turkey. The development was backed by the Turkish State Hydraulic Works.

== See also ==
- List of dams and reservoirs in Turkey
