= Onaç-1 Dam =

- Location: Turkey
- Coordinates: 37.481°N 30.5688°E

Onaç-1 Dam is a dam in Turkey. The development was backed by the Turkish State Hydraulic Works.

== See also ==
- List of dams and reservoirs in Turkey
