= Selevir Dam =

- Location: Turkey
- Coordinates: 38.5125°N 30.7182°E

Selevir Dam is a dam in Afyonkarahisar Province, Turkey, built between 1960 and 1964. The development was backed by the Turkish State Hydraulic Works.

== See also ==
- List of dams and reservoirs in Turkey
