= Bayır Dam =

Coordinates: 37°17′12.5″N 28°15′26.1″E

Bayir Dam
- Interactive map of Bayir Dam
- Location: Muğla Province, Turkey
- Purpose: Irrigation and industrial water
- Status: Operational
- Construction began: 1998
- Opening date: 2007

Dam and spillways
- Type of dam: Rockfill dam
- Height (foundation): 47 meters
- Dam volume: 1,230,000 m³

Reservoir
- Total capacity: 7,000,000 m³

Bayır Dam is a dam in Muğla Province, Turkey, built between 1998 and 2007. It is still in use.

== See also ==
- List of dams and reservoirs in Turkey
