= Hasanağa Dam =

Coordinates: 40.161°N 28.7927°E

- Location: Bursa Province, Turkey
- Purpose: Irrigation and industrial water
- Status: Operational
- Construction began: 1978
- Opening date: 1985

Dam and spillways
- Type of dam: Earth/rockfill dam
- Height (foundation): 37 m
- Dam volume: 873,000 m³

Reservoir
- Total capacity: 4,000,000 m³

Hasanağa Dam is a dam in Bursa Province, Turkey. The development was backed by the Turkish State Hydraulic Works. Construction on the dam began in 1978 and finished in 1985.

== See also ==
- List of dams and reservoirs in Turkey
