= Kızıldamlar Dam =

- Interactive map of Kızıldamlar Dam
- Location: Turkey
- Coordinates: 40.0407°N 30.1179°E

Kızıldamlar Dam is a dam in Turkey. The development was backed by the Turkish State Hydraulic Works.

== See also ==
- List of dams and reservoirs in Turkey
