= Kavakdere Dam =

Coordinates: 38.1769°N 26.9016°E

- Location: Turkey
- Construction began: 1994

Dam and spillways
- Type of dam: Earth fill dam

Reservoir
- Surface area: 1km^2

Kavakdere Dam is a dam in İzmir Province, Turkey, built between 1994 and

2002. The development was backed by the Turkish State Hydraulic Works.

== See also ==
- List of dams and reservoirs in Turkey
