= Yarseli Dam =

- Location: Turkey
- Coordinates: 36.1939°N 36.3269°E

Yarseli Dam is a dam in Turkey. The development was backed by the Turkish State Hydraulic Works.

== See also ==
- List of dams and reservoirs in Turkey
