= Germeçtepe Dam =

Coordinates: 41.4475°N 33.6349°E

- Location: Turkey
- Construction began: 1977
- Opening date: 1984

Germeçtepe Dam is a dam in Kastamonu Province, Turkey, built between 1977 and 1984. The development was backed by the Turkish State Hydraulic Works.

== See also ==
- List of dams and reservoirs in Turkey
