= Sille Dam =

Dam in Sarayönü, Konya, Turkey

Coordinates: 37.926224°N 32.400355°E

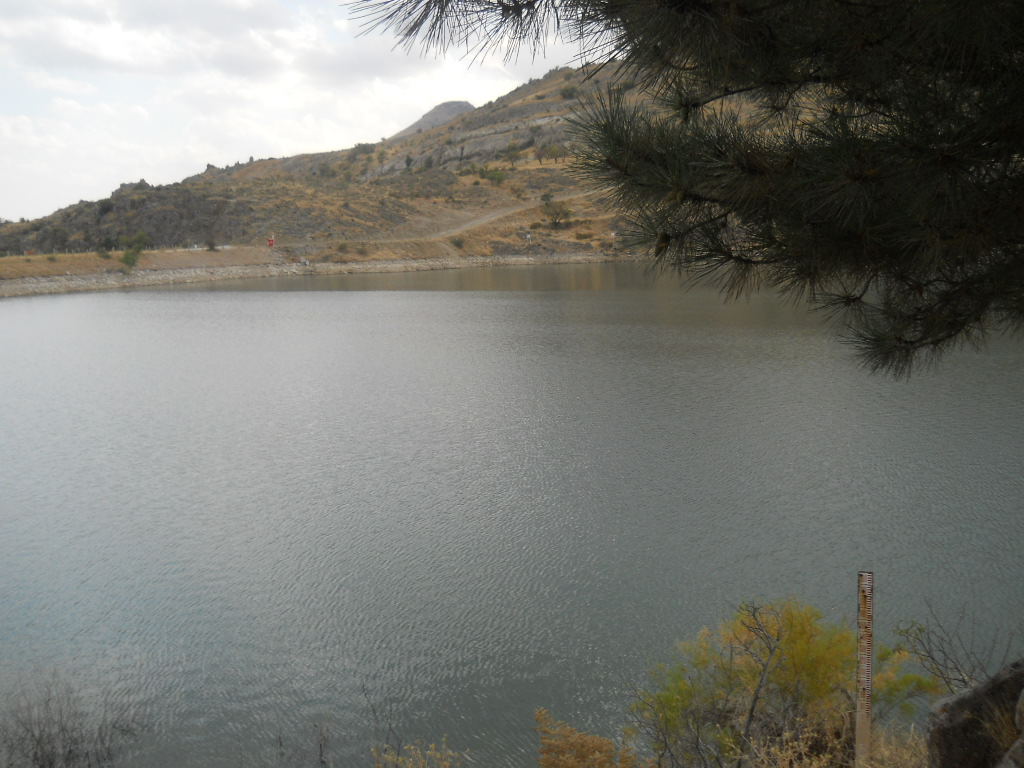
Sille Dam

Sille Dam (Turkish: Sille Barajı) is a dam in Konya Province in Turkey.
