= Devegeçidi Dam =

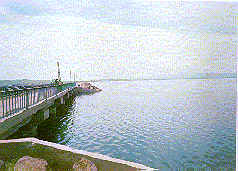

- Location within Turkey
- Interactive map of Devegeçidi Dam
- Official name: Devegeçidi Baraji
- Location: Diyarbakır, Turkey
- Coordinates: 38°03′25″N 39°59′10″E
- Purpose: Irrigation
- Status: Operational
- Construction began: 1965
- Opening date: 1972
- Owner: State Hydraulic Works

Dam and spillways
- Type of dam: Embankment, rock-fill
- Impounds: Furtaksa River
- Height: 33 m (108 ft)
- Length: 6,690 m (21,949 ft)
- Elevation at crest: 759 m (2,490 ft)
- Width (crest): 8 m (26 ft)
- Width (base): 135 m (443 ft)
- Dam volume: 3,200,000 m^{3} (2,594 acre⋅ft)
- Spillway type: Service overflow, controlled-chute
- Spillway capacity: 2,600 m^{3}/s (91,818 cu ft/s)

Reservoir
- Creates: Devegeçidi Reservoir
- Total capacity: 219,000,000 m^{3} (178,000 acre⋅ft)
- Active capacity: 212,000,000 m^{3} (172,000 acre⋅ft)
- Inactive capacity: 7,000,000 m^{3} (5,700 acre⋅ft)
- Catchment area: 1,578 km^{2} (609 sq mi)
- Surface area: 30 km^{2} (12 mi^{2})
- Maximum length: 13 km (8.1 mi)
- Normal elevation: 757 m (2,484 ft)

Devegeçidi Dam is one of the 22 dams of the Southeastern Anatolia Project of Turkey, Diyarbakır. It is near Diyarbakır on a branch of the Tigris river. It was constructed for irrigation purposes between 1965 and 1972.
