= Erkenek Dam =

Dam and hydroelectric plant in Turkey

Erkenek Dam and Power Plant
- Country: Turkey
- Location: Adıyaman Province, Turkey
- Coordinates: 37°54′35″N 37°48′37″E
- Status: Operational
- Owner: Tektuğ Co.

Power generation
- Nameplate capacity: 13 MW
- Annual net output: 52 GWh

Erkenek Dam is a dam and hydroelectric plant in Adıyaman Province, southeastern Turkey.

Erkenek Dam is on Karanlıkdere Creek in Adıyaman Province at 37°54′35″N 37°48′37″E. Its elevation with respect to sea level is 940 metres (3,080 ft).

It is a small plant owned by Tektuğ Company. Its nominal power is 13 MW and the total annual energy output is about 52 GWh. The plant provides sufficient electricity for about 12,422 households.
