= Gebere Dam =

Dam in Niğde Province, Turkey

Coordinates: 38°02′43″N 34°38′13″E

- Location: Turkey
- Opening date: 1941

Dam and spillways
- Impounds: Uzandý
- Height: 13 feet (4 m)
- Length: 1,560 feet (475 m)
- Width (base): 300 feet (91 m)

Reservoir
- Total capacity: 2.38
- Catchment area: 340
- Surface area: 26

Gebere Dam is a dam in Turkey.

== Sources ==
- (in English) www.dsi.gov.tr/tricold/gebere.htm Site of the Turkish government agency of hydraulic works
