= Mediterranean region, Turkey =

Coordinates: 37°00′N 34°00′E

Mediterranean Region Akdeniz Bölgesi
- Region
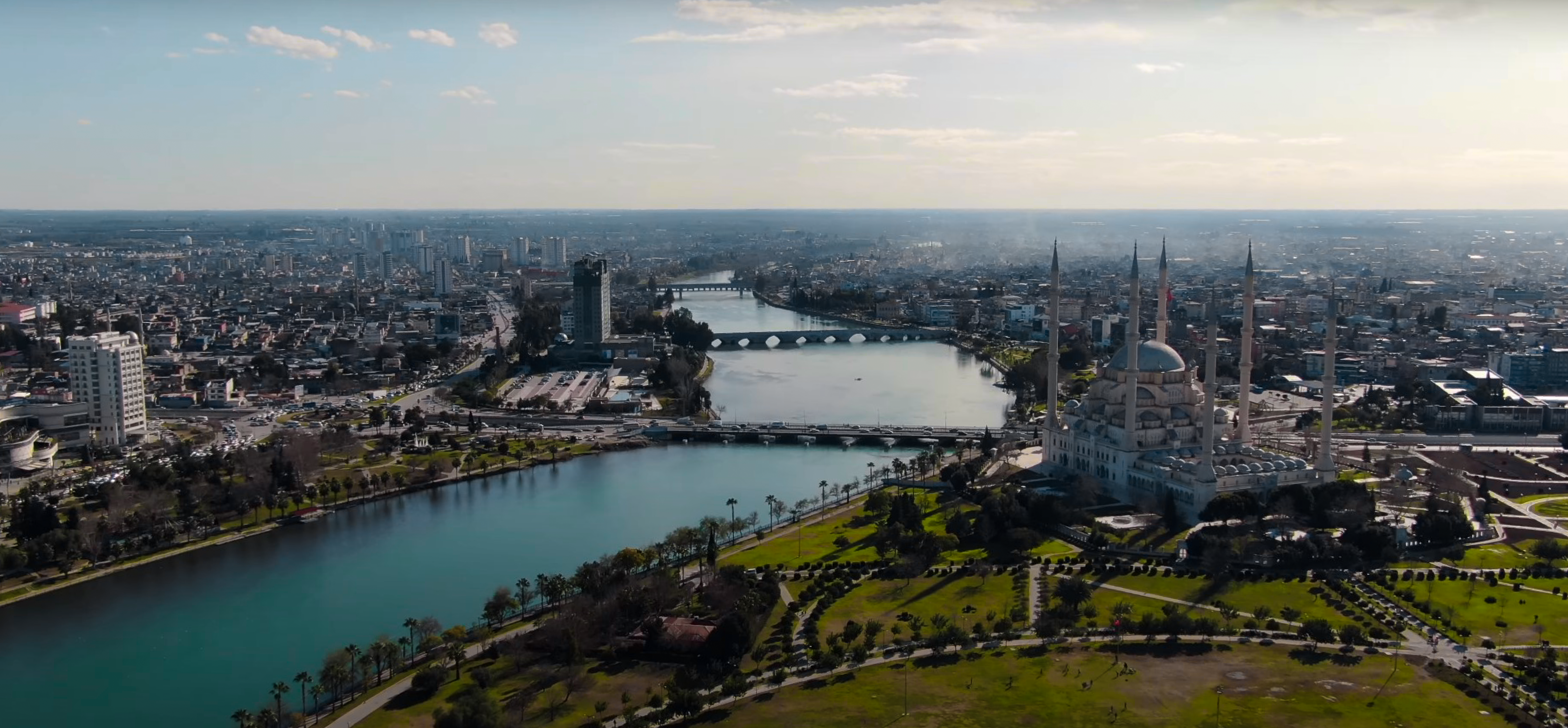
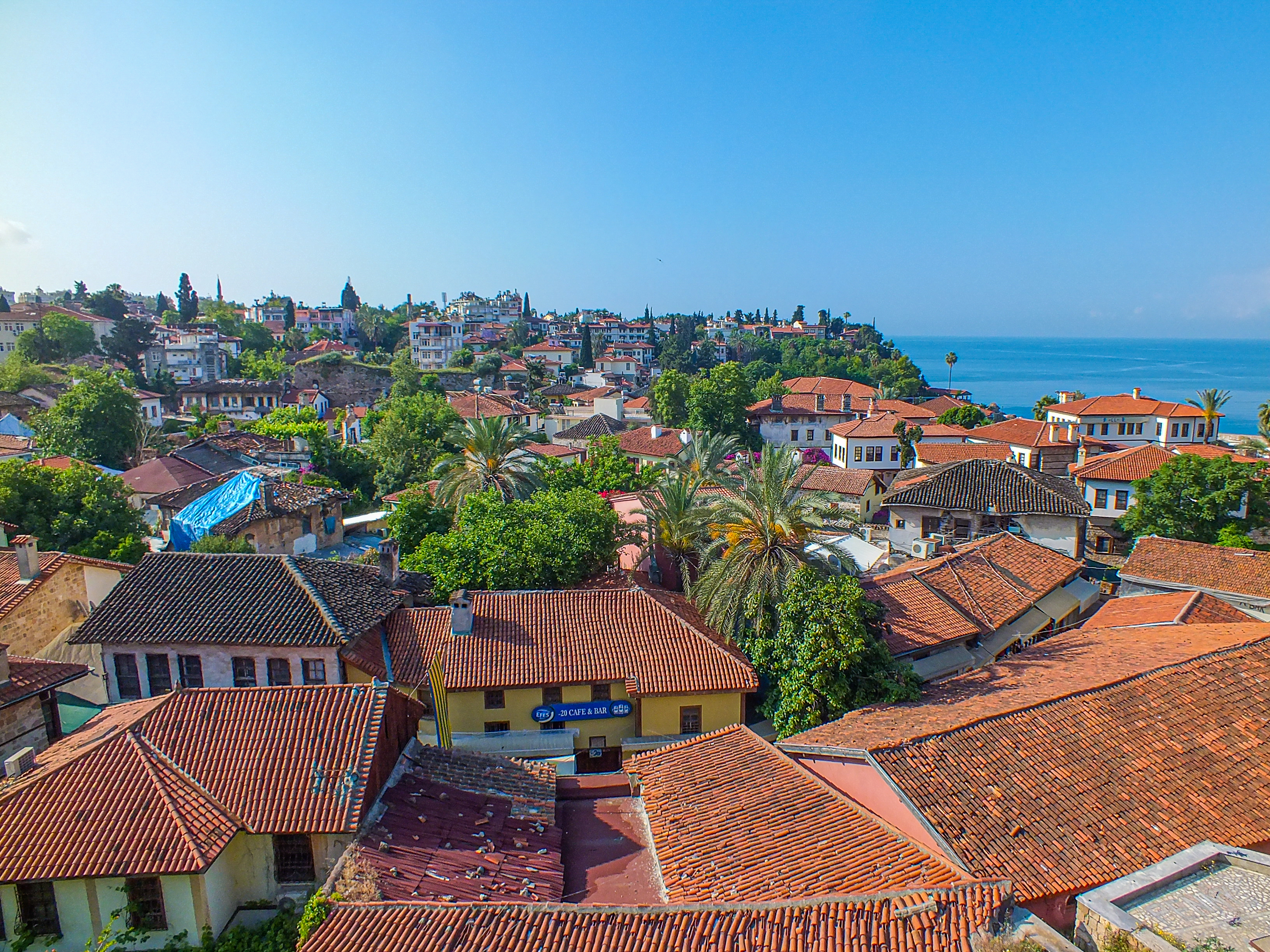
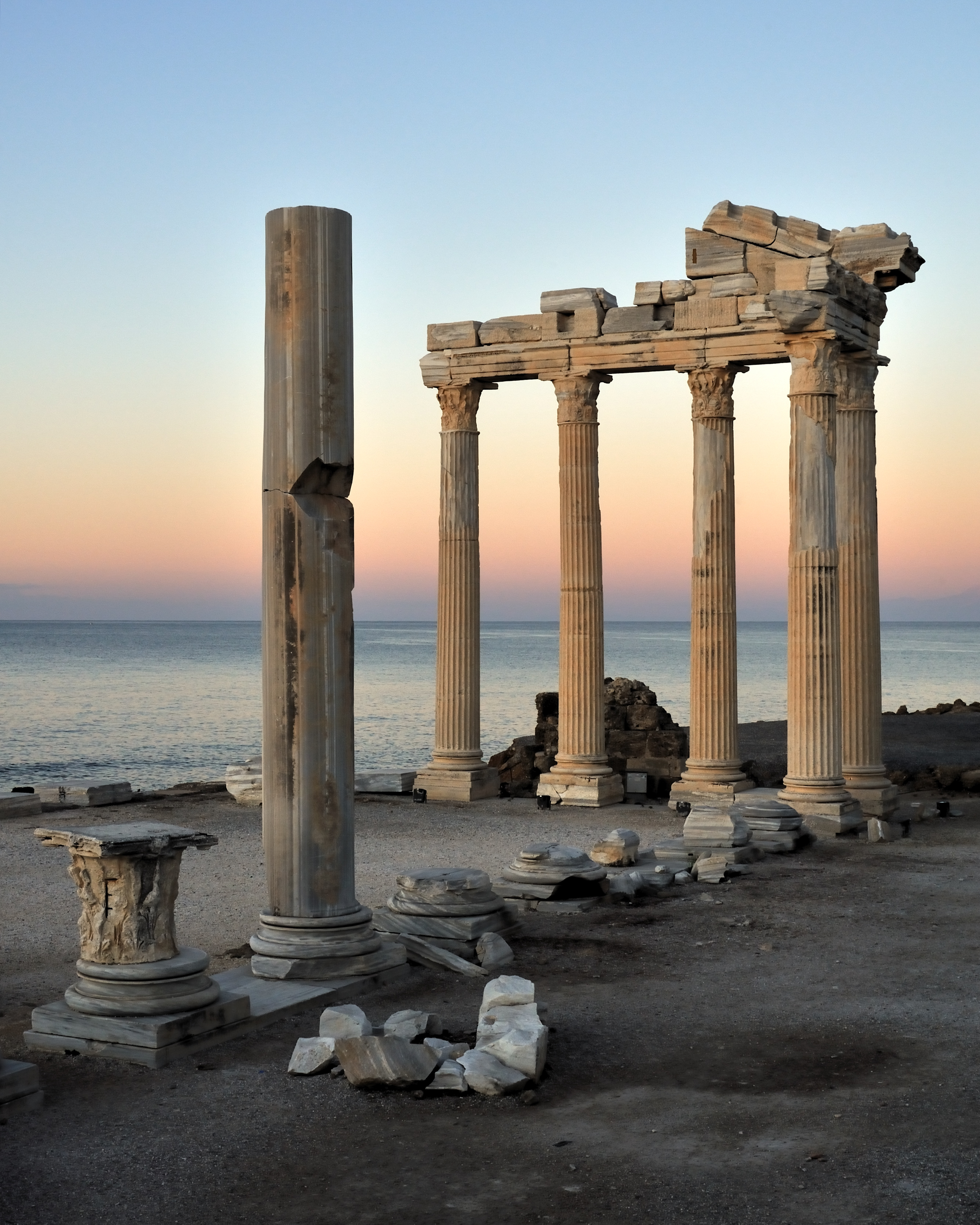
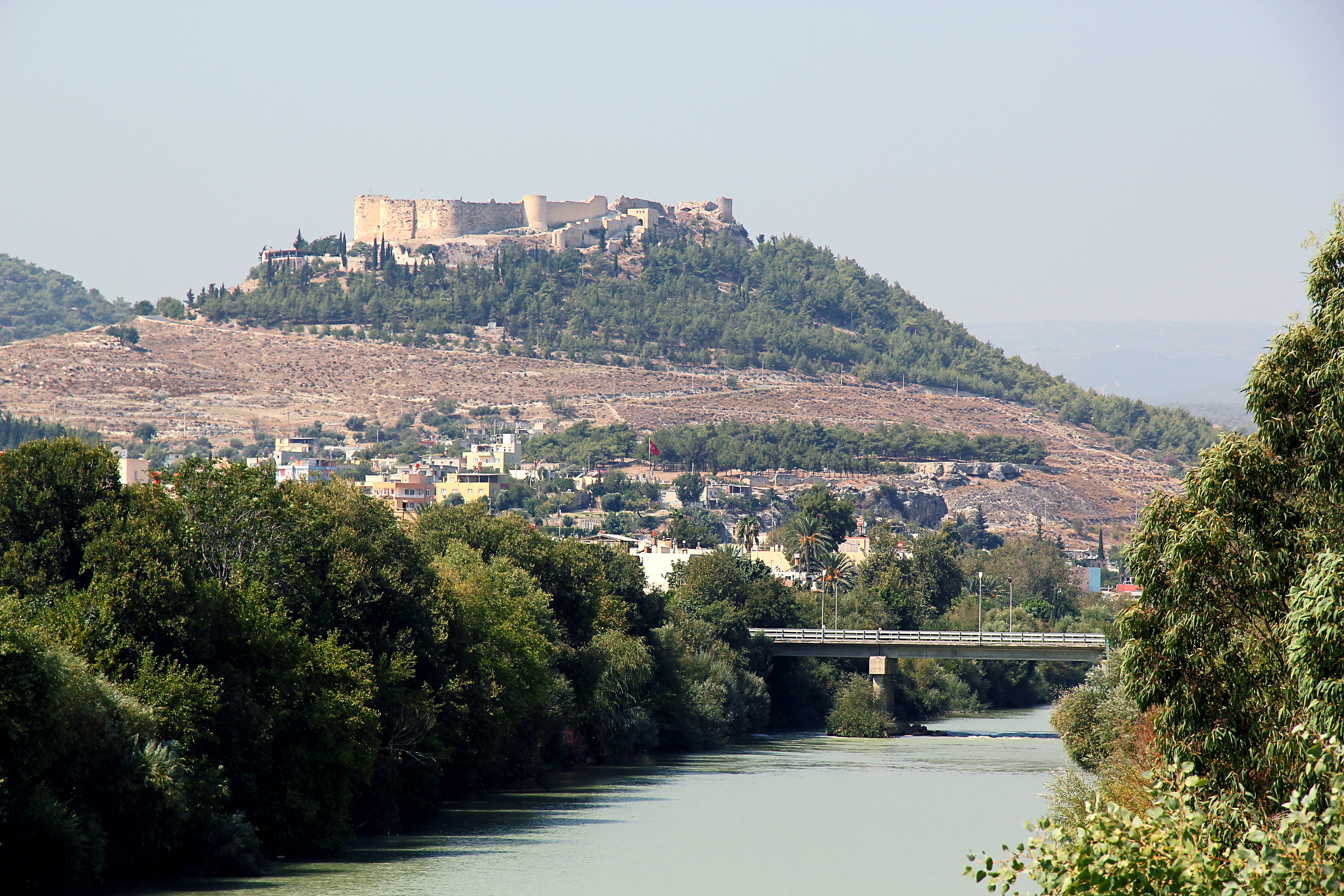
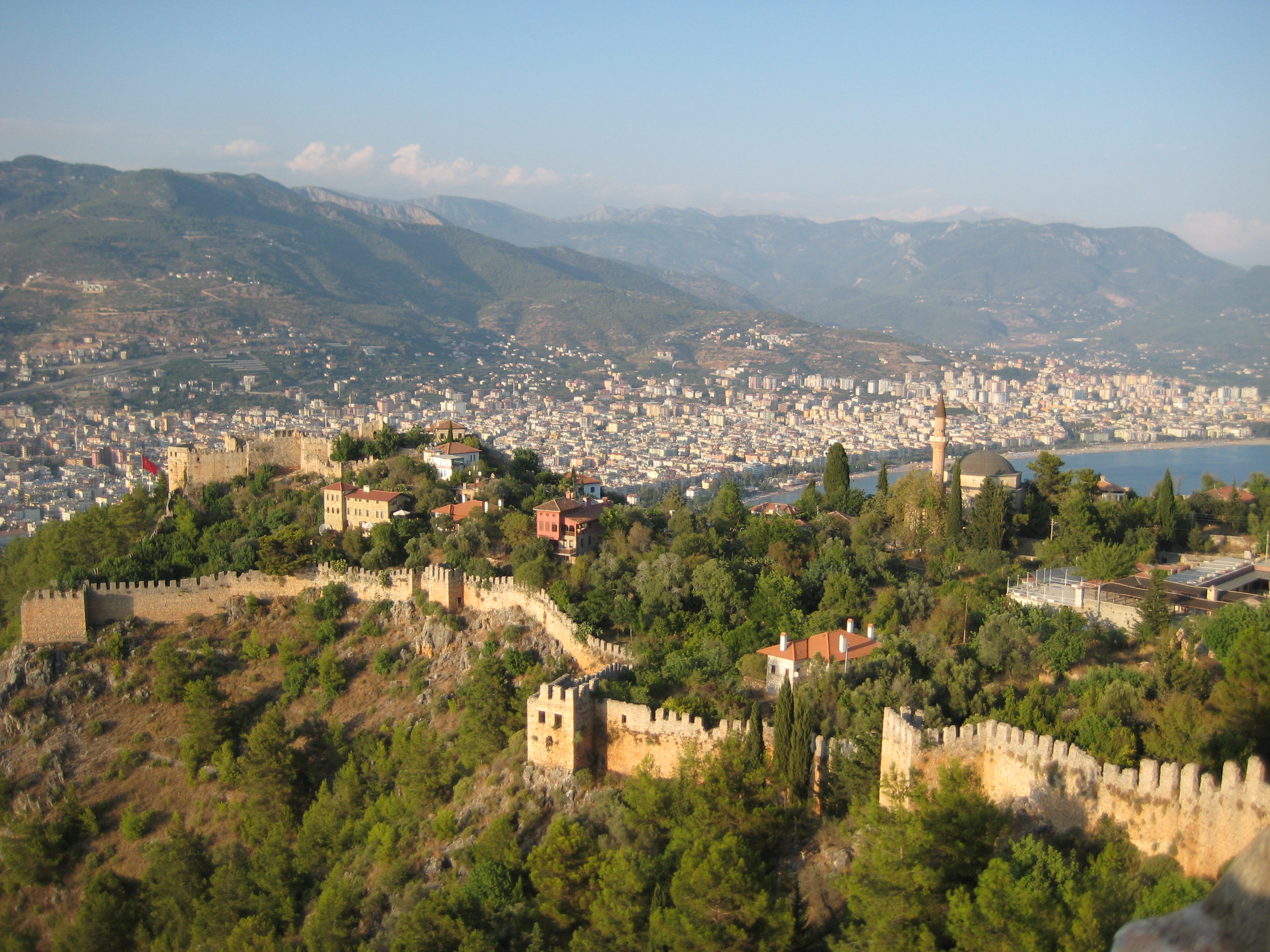
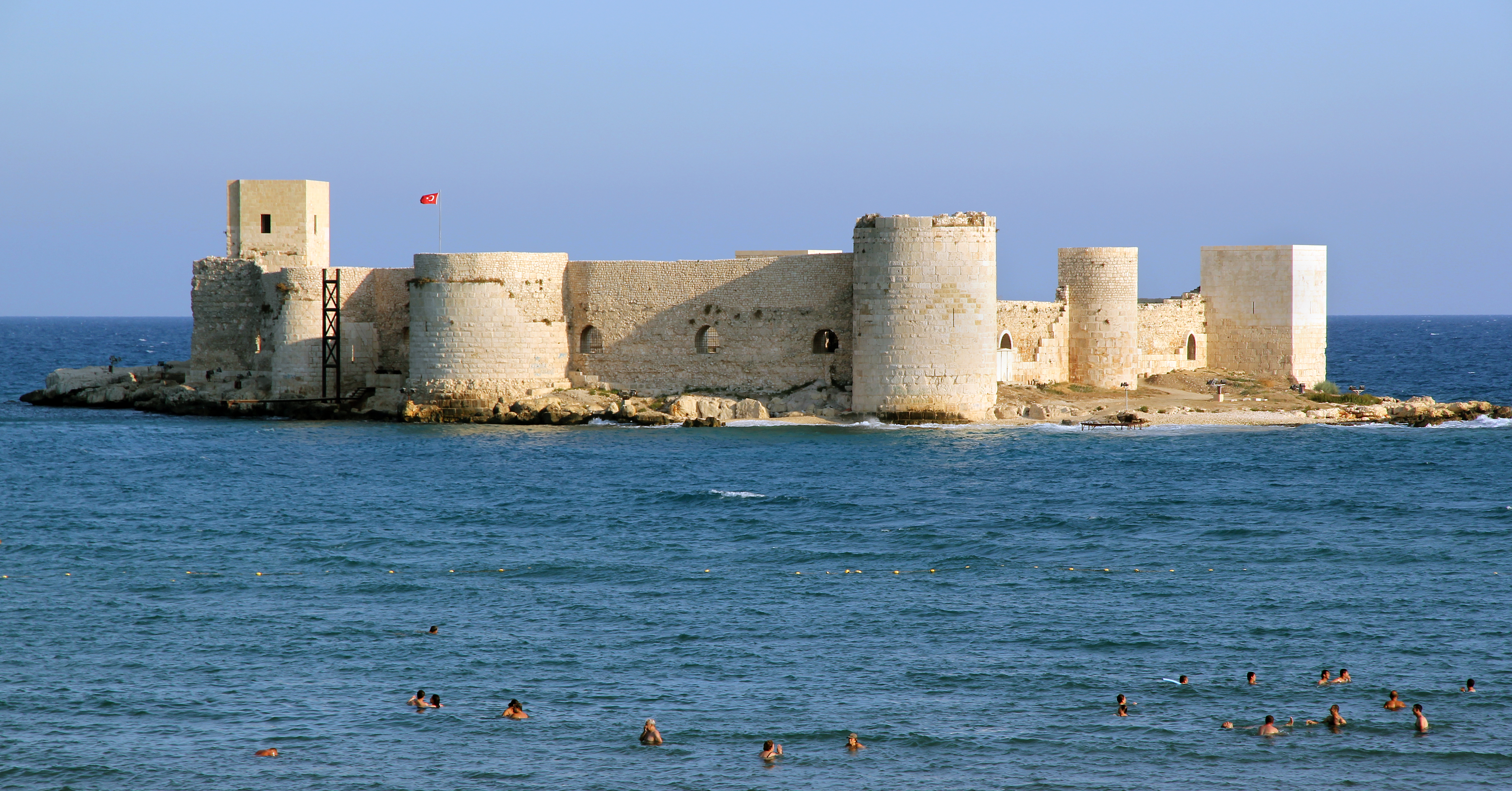
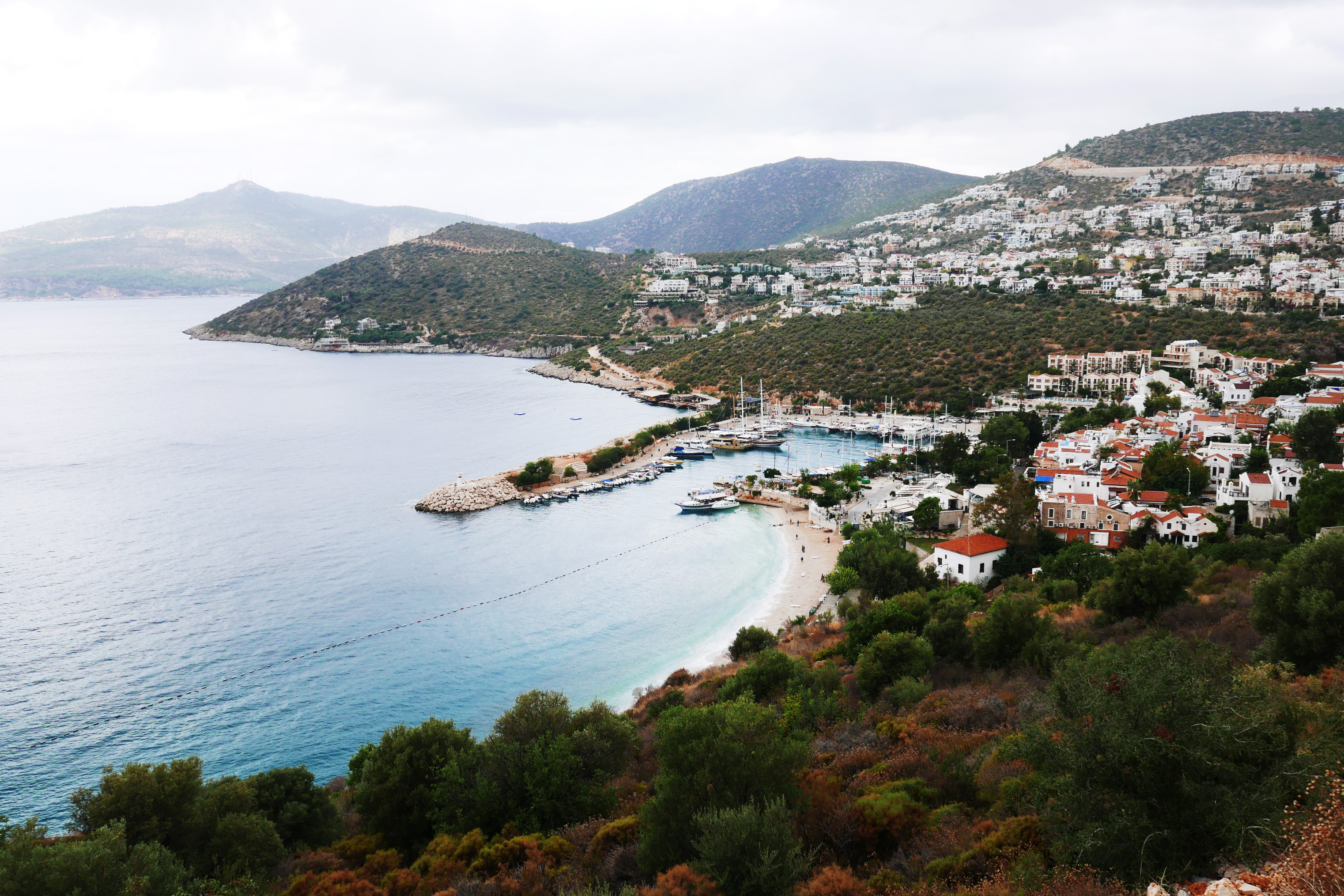
- Adana Antalya Old Town Side Silifke Alanya Kızkalesi Kalkan

- Country: Turkey
- Capital: Antalya
- Provinces: 8: Adana; Antalya; Mersin; Burdur; Hatay; Isparta; Osmaniye; Kahramanmaraş

Area
  - Total: 122,927 km^{2} (47,462 sq mi)
  - Rank: 4th

Population (Jan. 2022)(INSEE)
  - Total: 10,584,506
  - Rank: 3rd
  - Density: 86.1040/km^{2} (223.008/sq mi)
- Demonym: Turkish: Akdenizli

GDP
  - Total: US$ 81.360 billion (2022)
  - Per capita: US$ 7,690 (2022)
- Time zone: UTC+03:00 (CET)
  - Summer (DST): UTC+03:00 (CEST)
- ISO 3166 code: TR-IDF
- NUTS Region: TR6

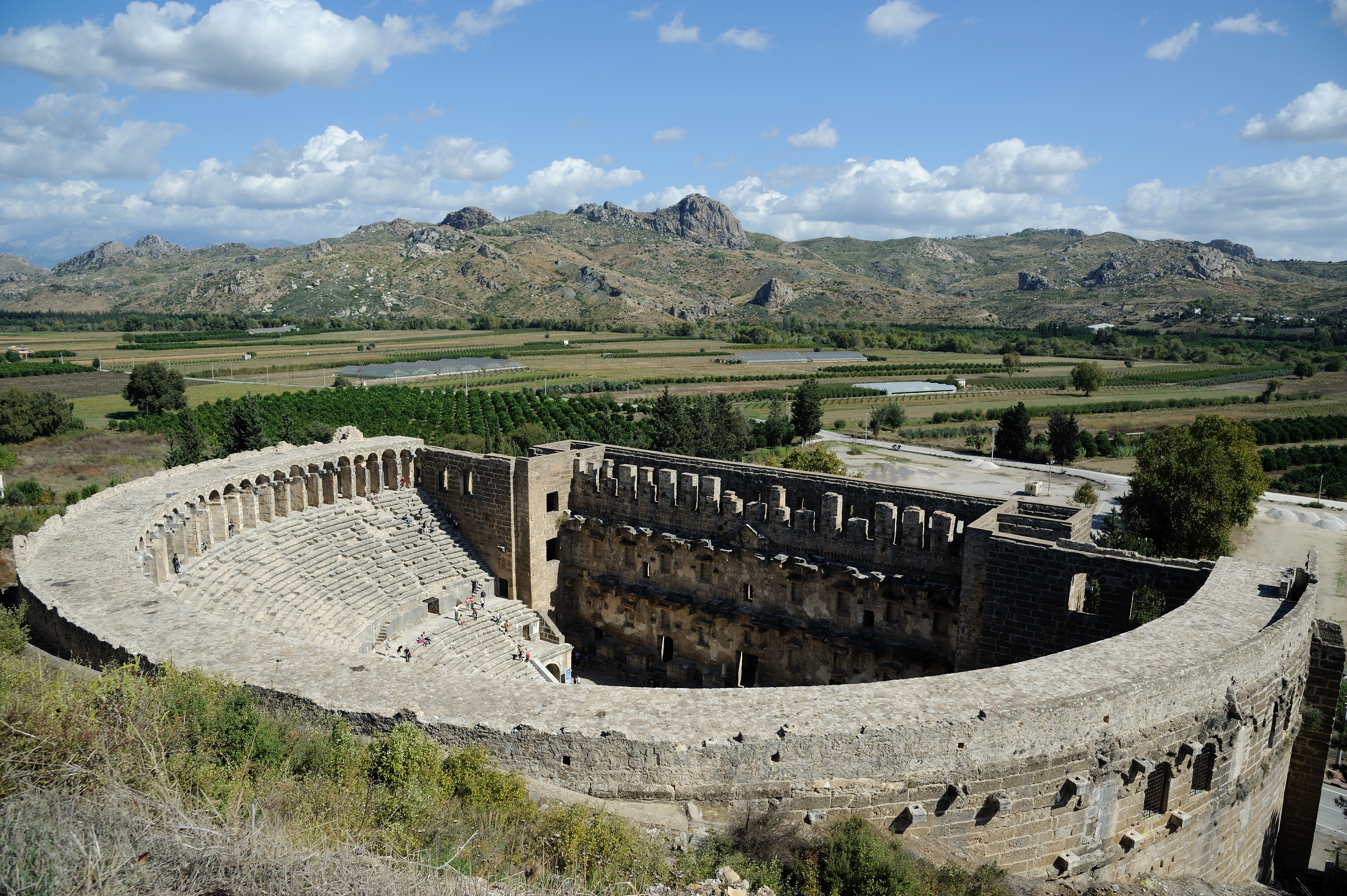
Opening ceremony of International Antalya Golden Orange Film Festival is made in Aspendos.

The Mediterranean Region (Turkish: Akdeniz Bölgesi) is a geographical region of Turkey. The largest city in the region is Antalya. Other big cities are Adana, Mersin, Isparta, Hatay and Kahramanmaraş.

It is bordered by the Aegean Region to the west, the Central Anatolia Region to the north, the Eastern Anatolia Region to the northeast, the Southeastern Anatolia Region to the east, Syria to the southeast, and the Mediterranean Sea to the south.

== Subdivision ==
- Adana Section (Turkish: Adana Bölümü)
  - Çukurova - Taurus Mountains Area (Turkish: Çukurova - Toros Yöresi)
  - Antakya - Kahramanmaraş Area (Turkish: Antakya - Kahramanmaraş Yöresi)
- Antalya Section (Turkish: Antalya Bölümü)
  - Antalya Area (Turkish: Antalya Yöresi)
  - Göller Area (Turkish: Göller Yöresi)
  - Taşeli - Mut Area (Turkish: Taşeli - Mut Yöresi)
  - Teke Area (Turkish: Teke Yöresi)

== Ecoregions ==
=== Terrestrial ===
==== Palearctic ====
===== Temperate grasslands, savannas, and shrublands =====
- Central Anatolian steppe

===== Mediterranean forests, woodlands, and scrub =====
- Anatolian conifer and deciduous mixed forests
- Eastern Mediterranean conifer-sclerophyllous-broadleaf forests
- Southern Anatolian montane conifer and deciduous forests

== Provinces ==
Provinces that are entirely in the Mediterranean Region:

- Adana
- Antalya
- Mersin
- Burdur
- Hatay
- Isparta
- Osmaniye

Provinces that are mostly in the Mediterranean Region:

- Kahramanmaraş

Provinces that are partially in the Mediterranean Region:

- Konya
- Niğde
- Kayseri
- Denizli
- Gaziantep
- Muğla
- Karaman
- Kilis

== Geography ==
Mediterranean Region is a mountainous region. Toros Mountains, a mountain chain from west to east, covers most of the region. Another chain is Amonos Mountains which run from north to south in the extreme east of the region. The mountains run in parallel to sea and in most places the mountains meet the sea except in coastal plains. The coastal plains were formed in the lower courses of the rivers. The most important coastal plain is Çukurova (Cilicia of the antiquity) in the eastern part of the region. It was formed by three rivers, Berdan, Seyhan and Ceyhan. Main lakes of the region, like Lake Beyşehir, Lake Eğirdir and Lake Burdur which form a closed basin are in the north west of the region.

The capital of each province is a city bearing the name of the province except Antakya which is the capital city of Hatay Province.

However, as the provinces are the administrative units their border lines do not exactly match that of the region. Thus, the region includes also the eastern part of Muğla Province as well as southern parts of the neighbouring provinces like Konya Province, Karaman Province and Niğde Province. On the other hand, northern and eastern parts of Kahramanmaraş Province are not included in Mediterranean region.

== Climate ==
Antalya

Climate chart (precipitation, max. and min. temperature)
J	F	M	A	M	J	J	A	S	O	N	D
227 15 6	139 15 6	100 18 8	61 22 11	32 26 14	9 31 19	6 35 22	5 34 22	16 31 19	86 27 15	172 21 10	269 16 7
- █ Average max. and min. temperatures in °C
- █ Precipitation totals in mm
- Source: Turkish State Meteorology
Imperial conversion
J	F	M	A	M	J	J	A	S	O	N	D
8.9 59 43	5.5 59 43	3.9 64 46	2.4 72 52	1.3 79 57	0.4 88 66	0.2 95 72	0.2 93 72	0.6 88 66	3.4 81 59	6.8 70 50	11 61 45
- █ Average max. and min. temperatures in °F
- █ Precipitation totals in inches

The Mediterranean Region has a Mediterranean climate at the coast, with hot, dry summers and mild to cool, wet winters and a semi-arid continental climate in the interior with hot, dry summers and cold, snowy winters.

== See also ==
- Provinces of Turkey
- Cilicia

== Images ==
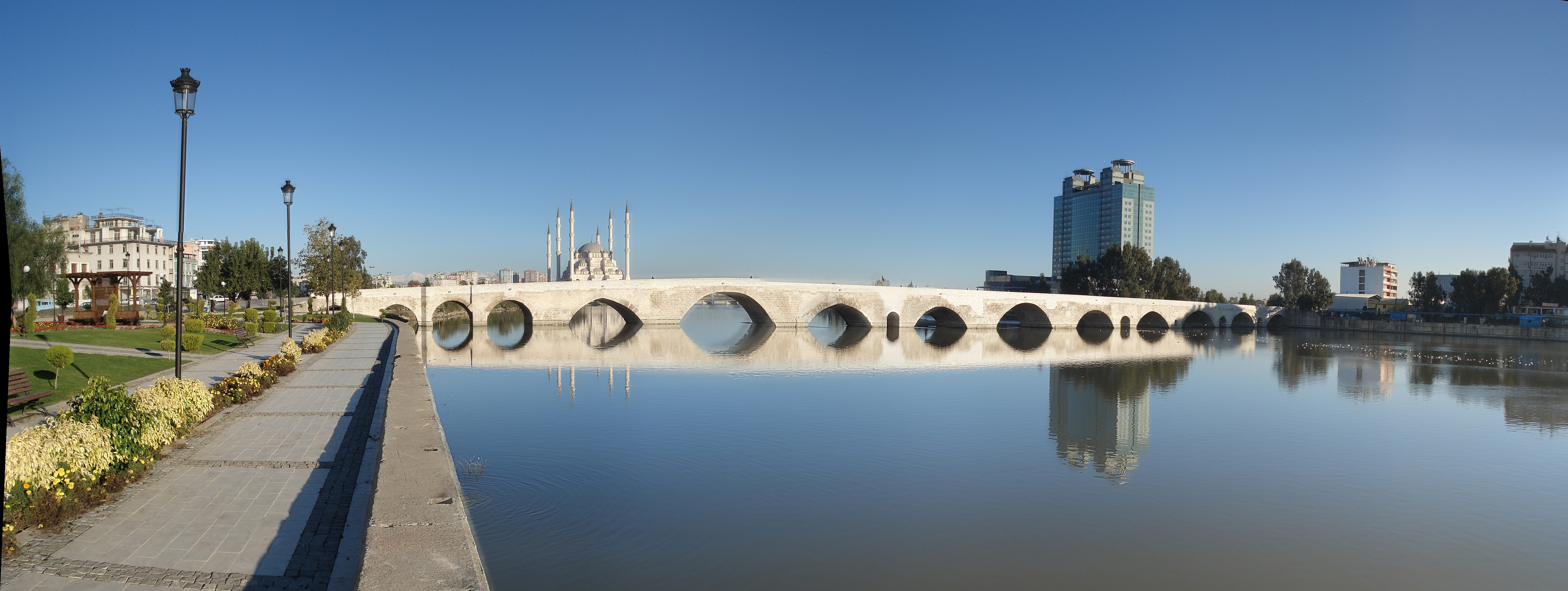
A view of Adana with the Roman era Stone Bridge

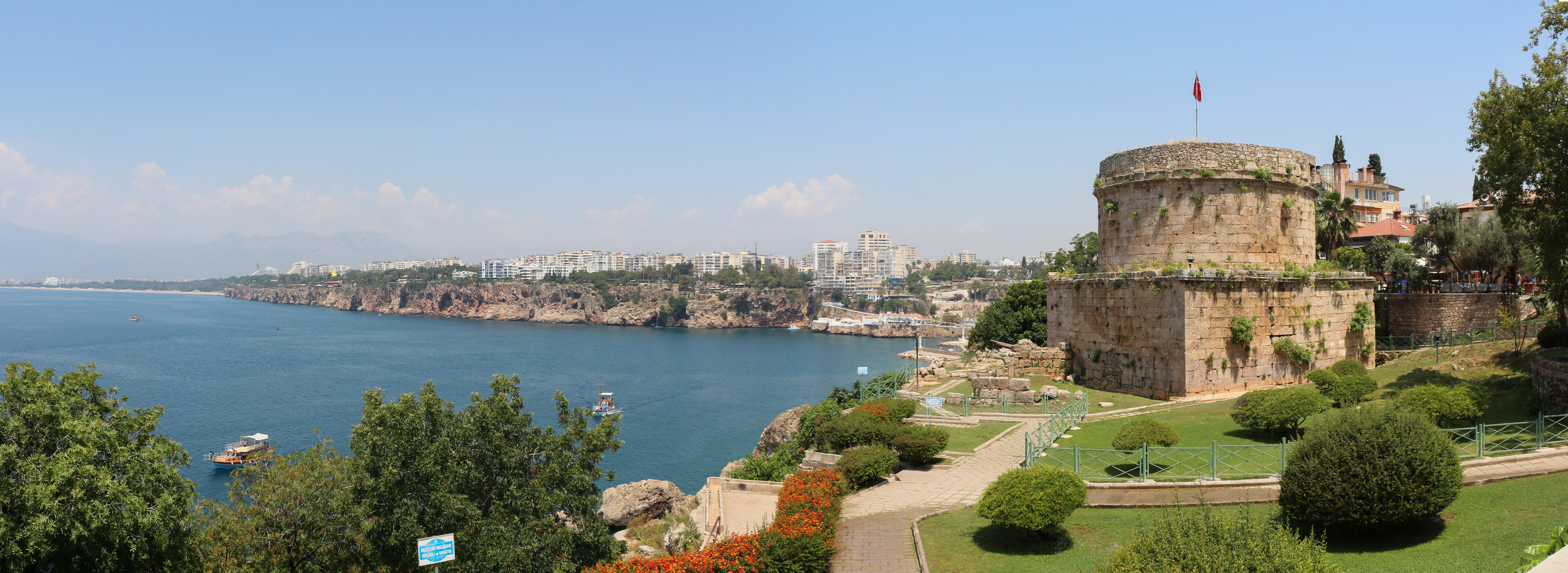
A panorama of Antalya with the Roman era Hıdırlık Tower

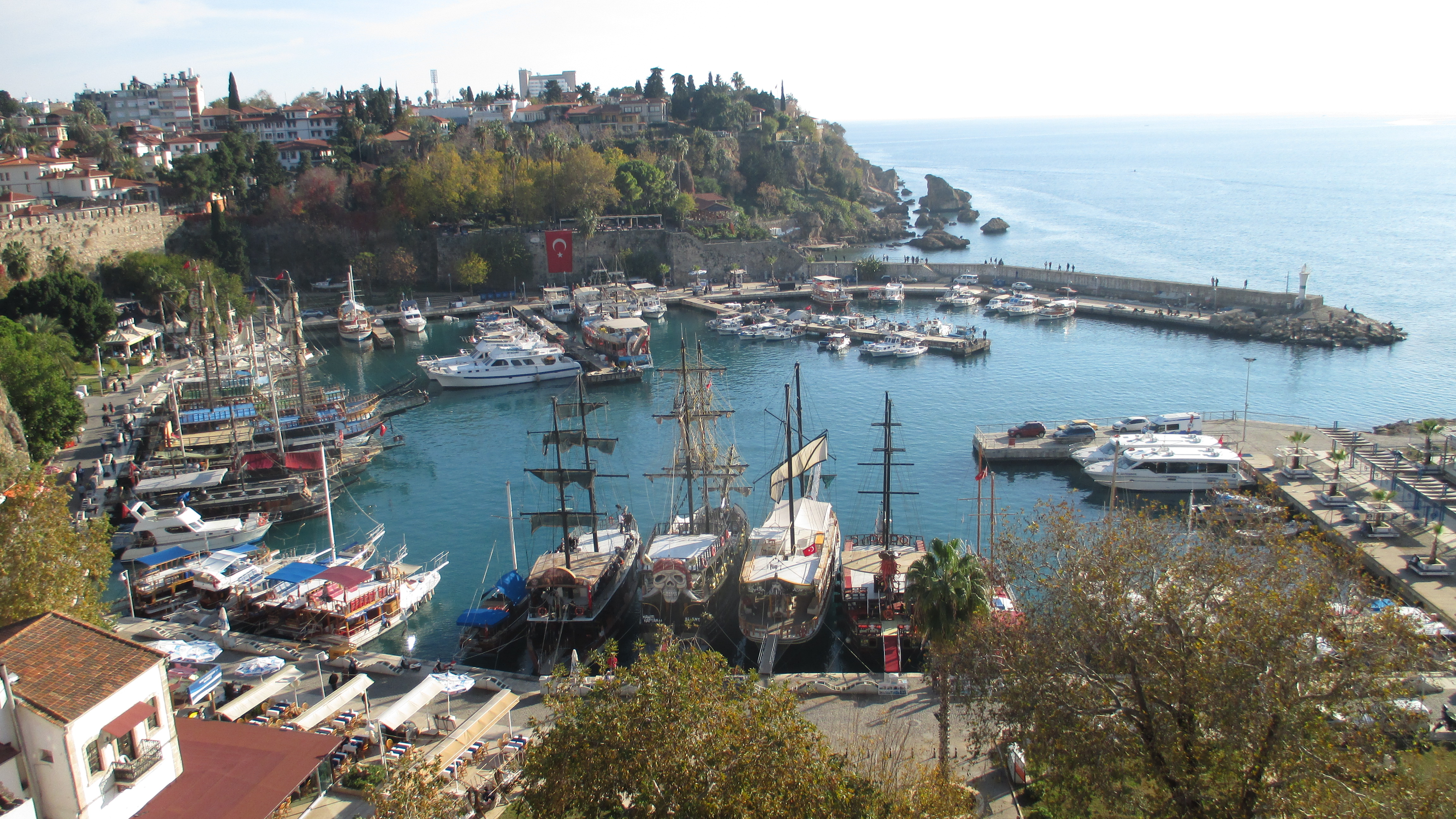
Kaleiçi, the historic city centre of Antalya

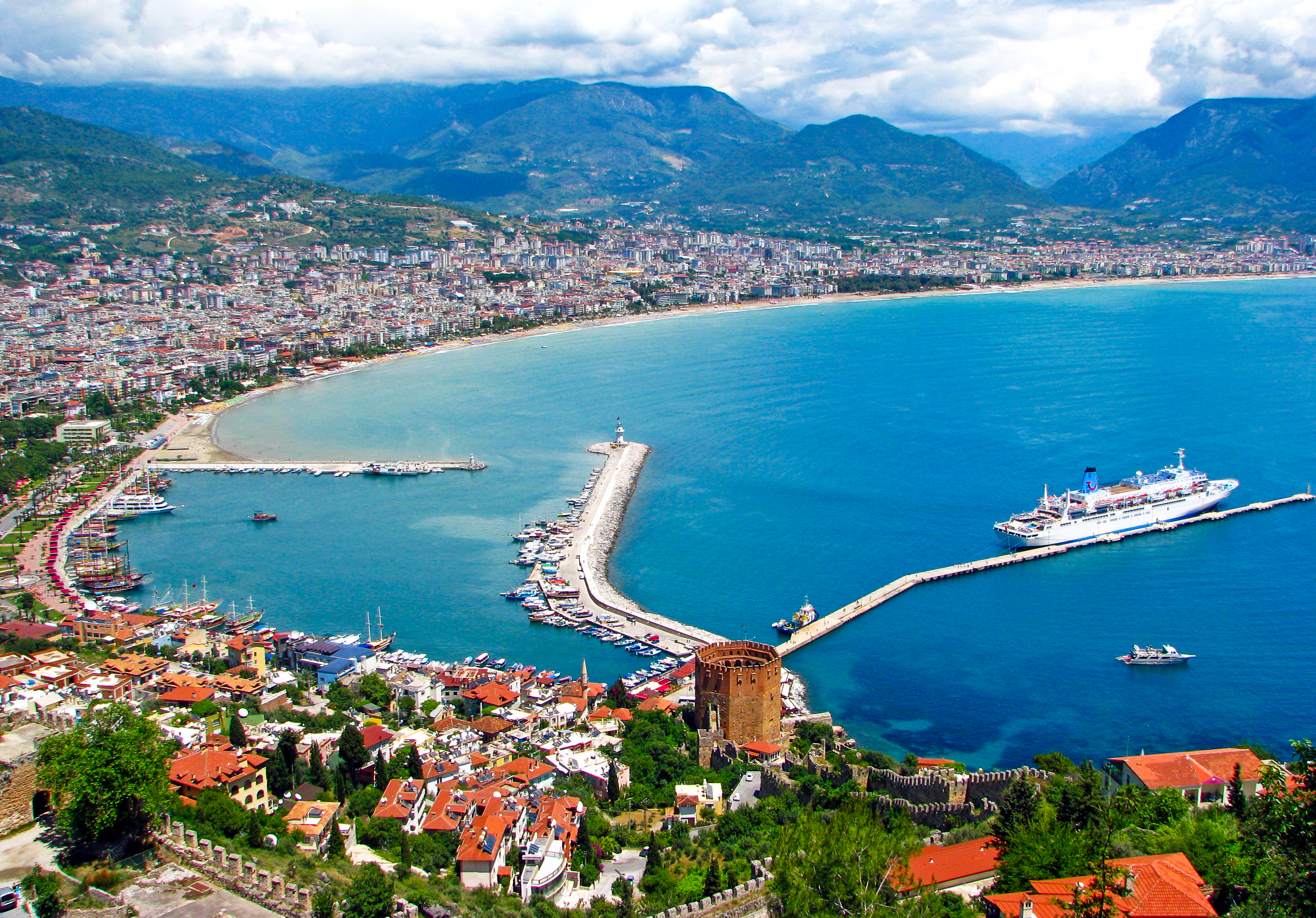
Alanya
Antalya Province

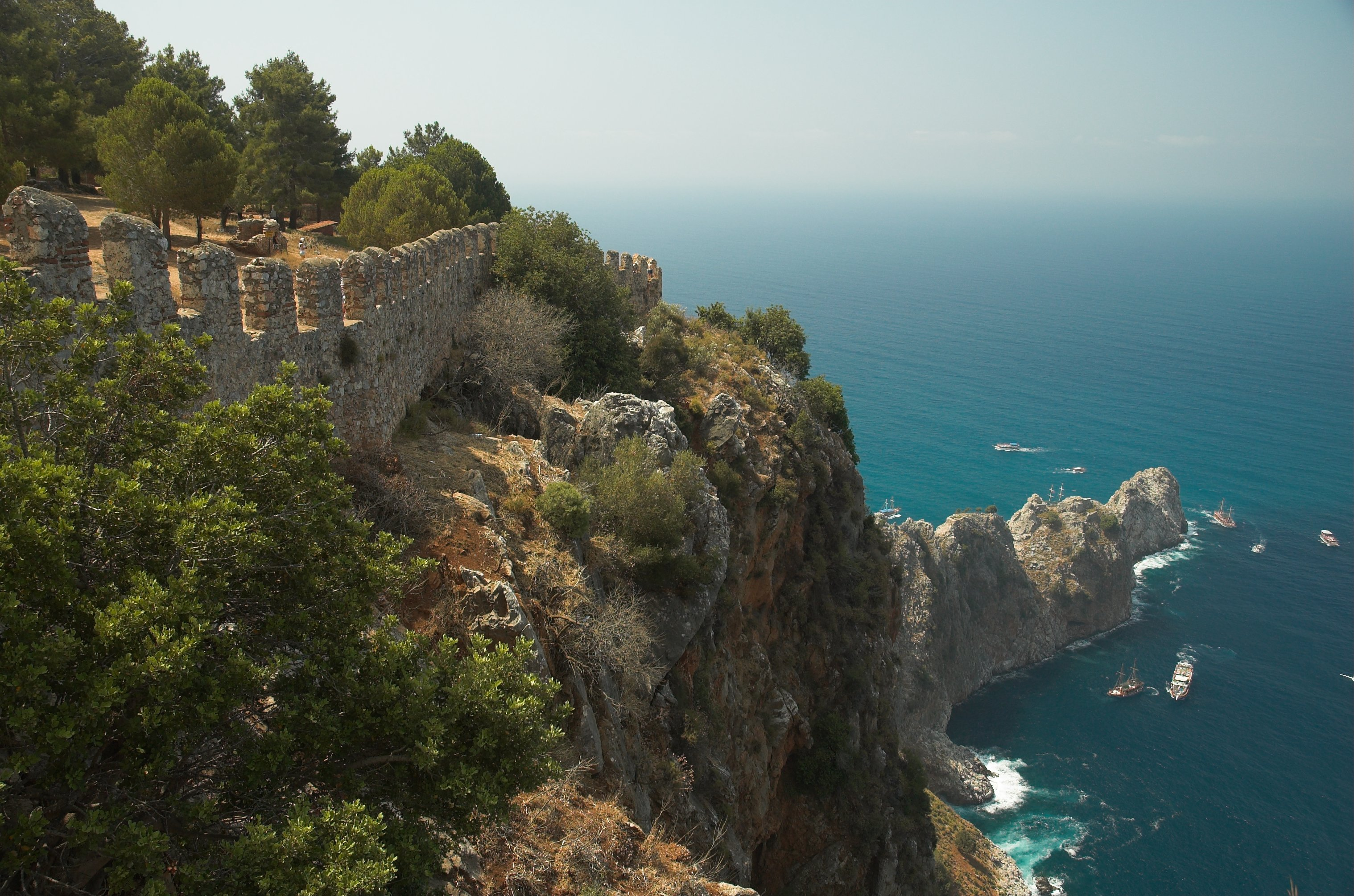
Alanya Castle and the tip of the Alanya peninsula
Antalya Province

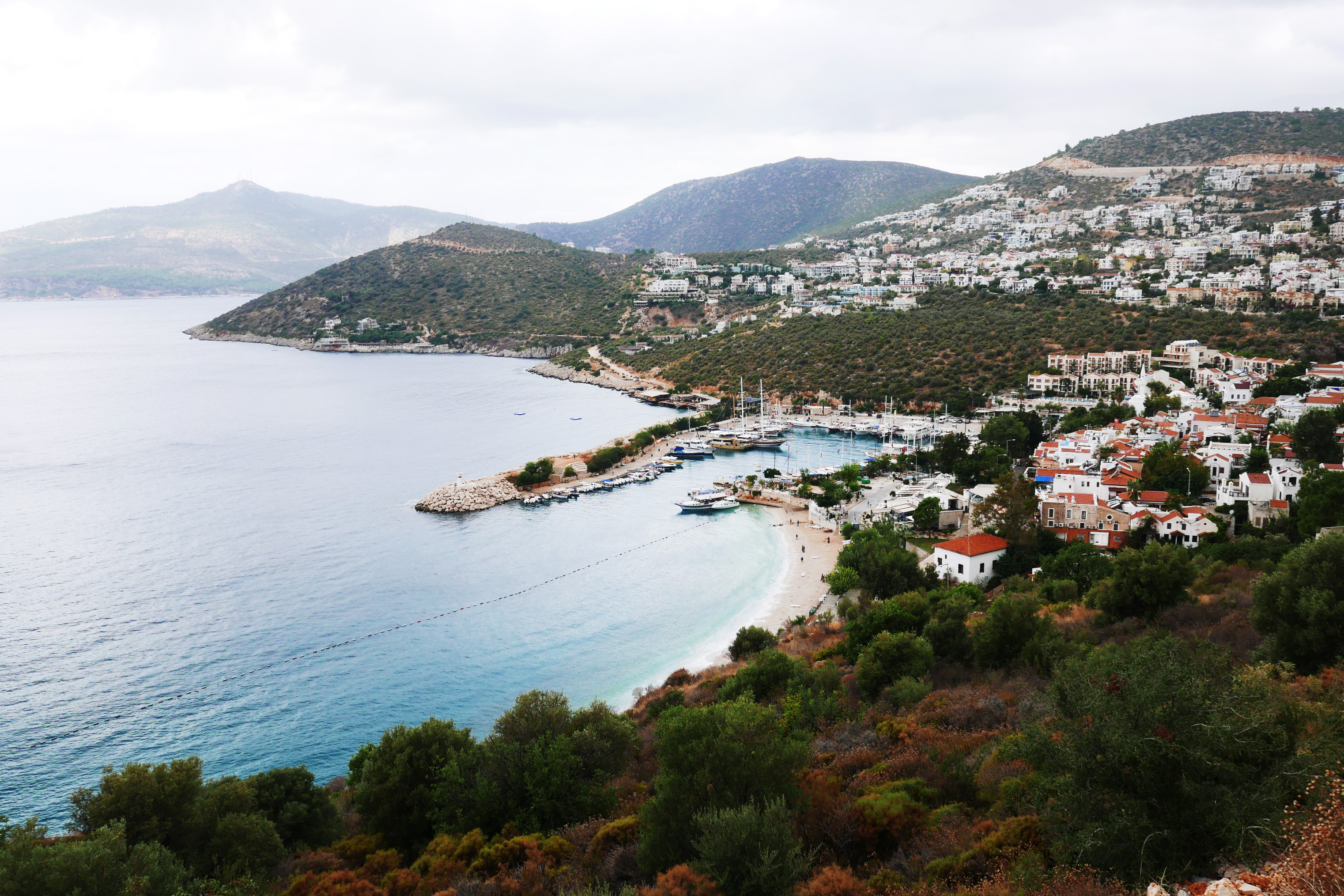
Kalkan, Kaş
Antalya Province

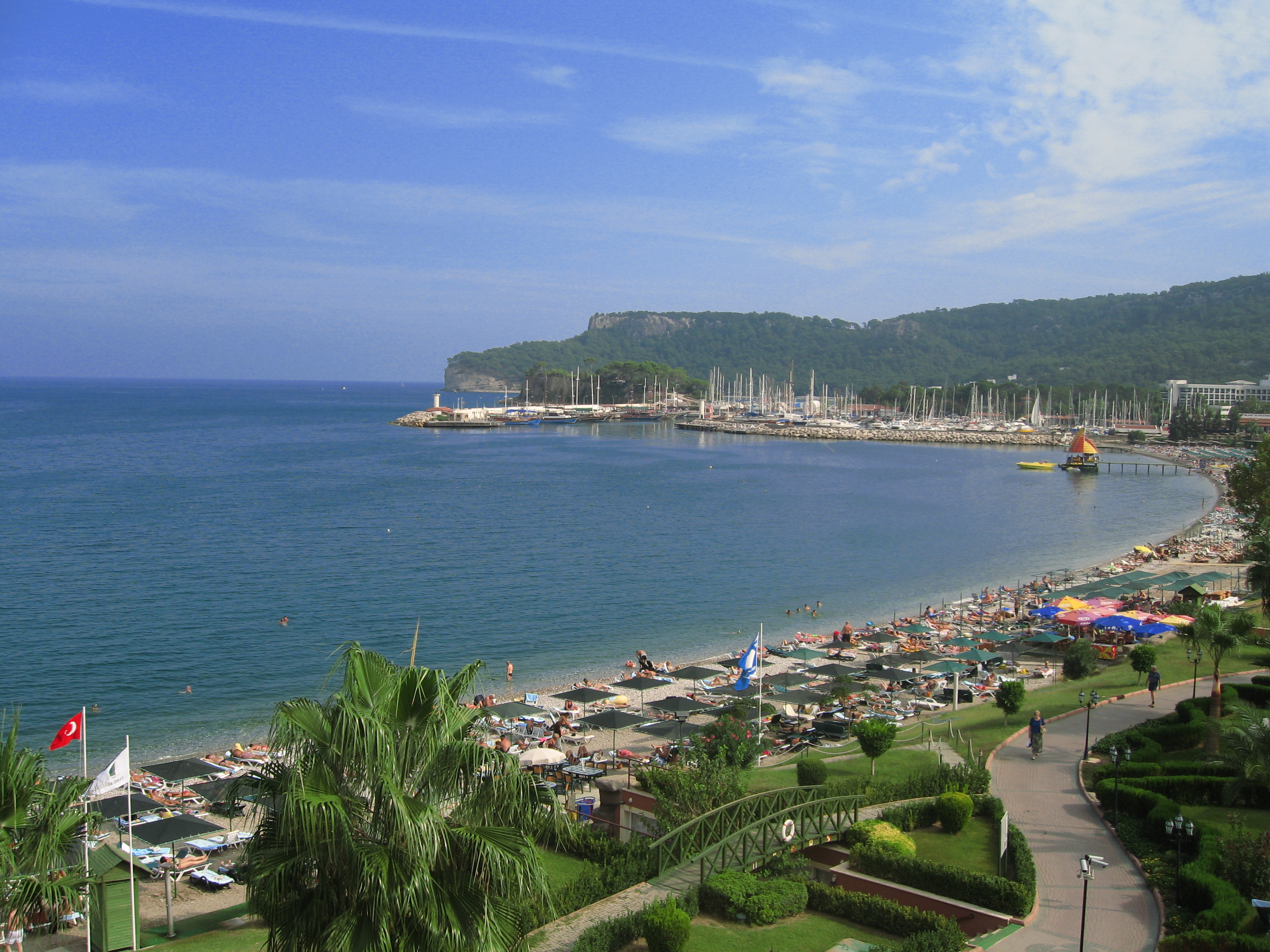
Kemer
Antalya Province

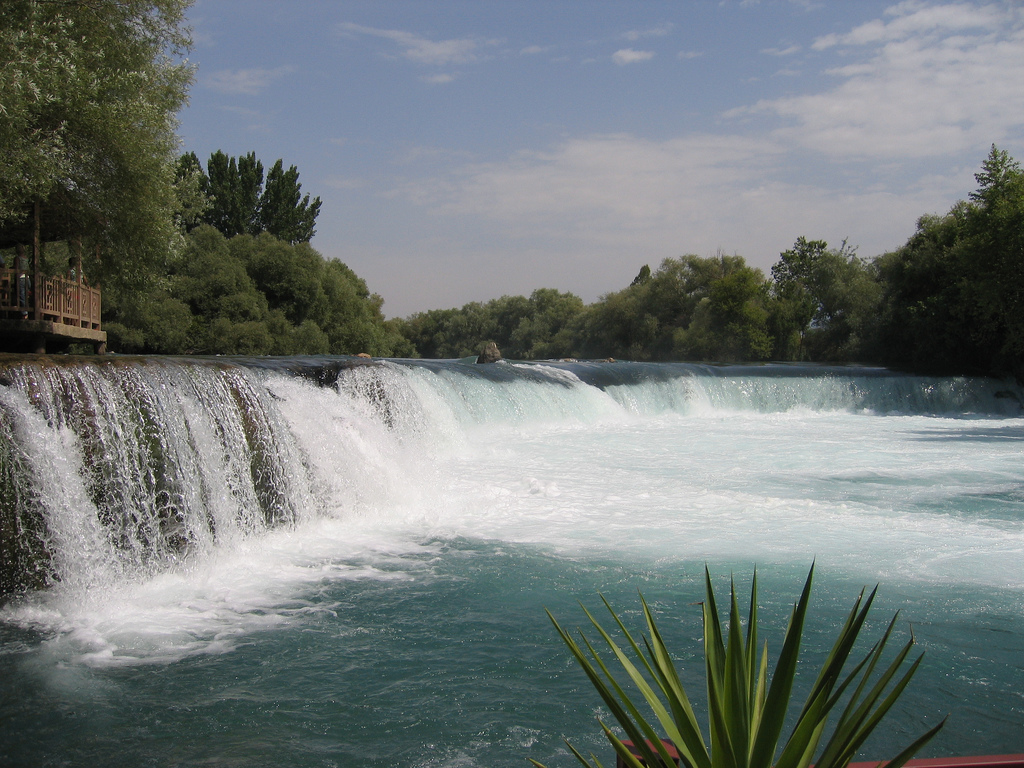
Manavgat Waterfall
Antalya Province

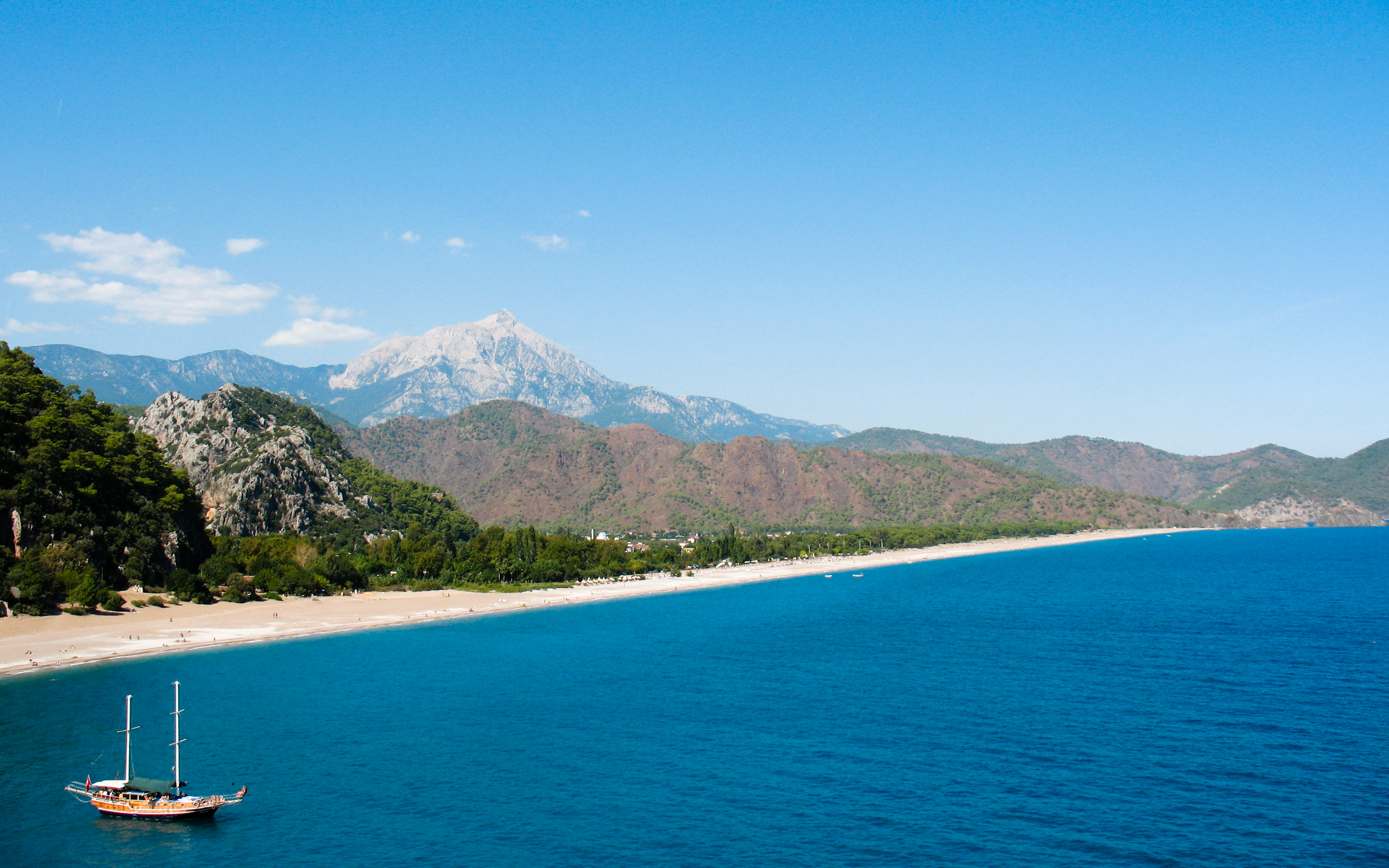
Mt. Olympos (Mt. Tahtalı)
Antalya Province

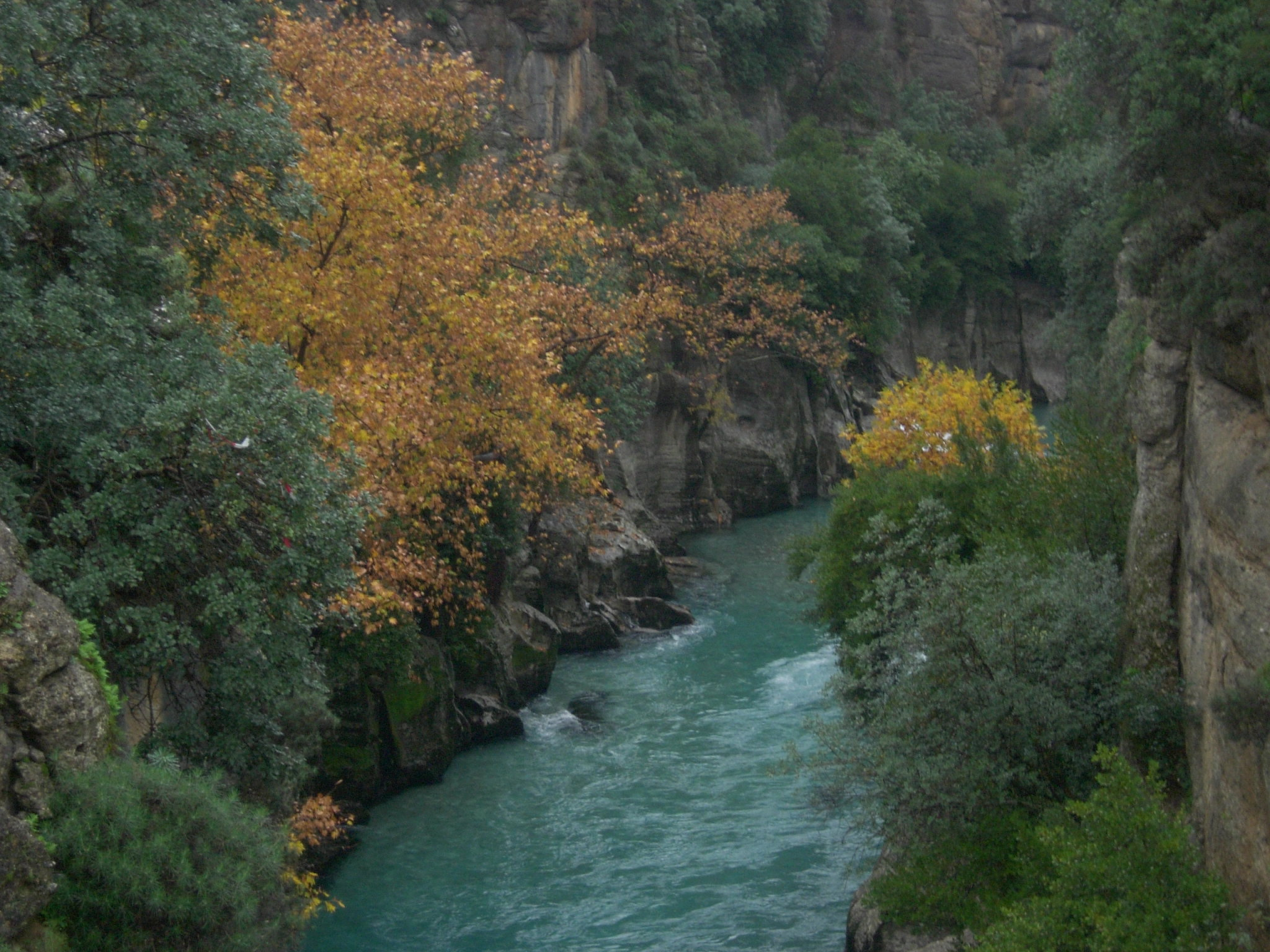
Köprülü Canyon
Burdur Province

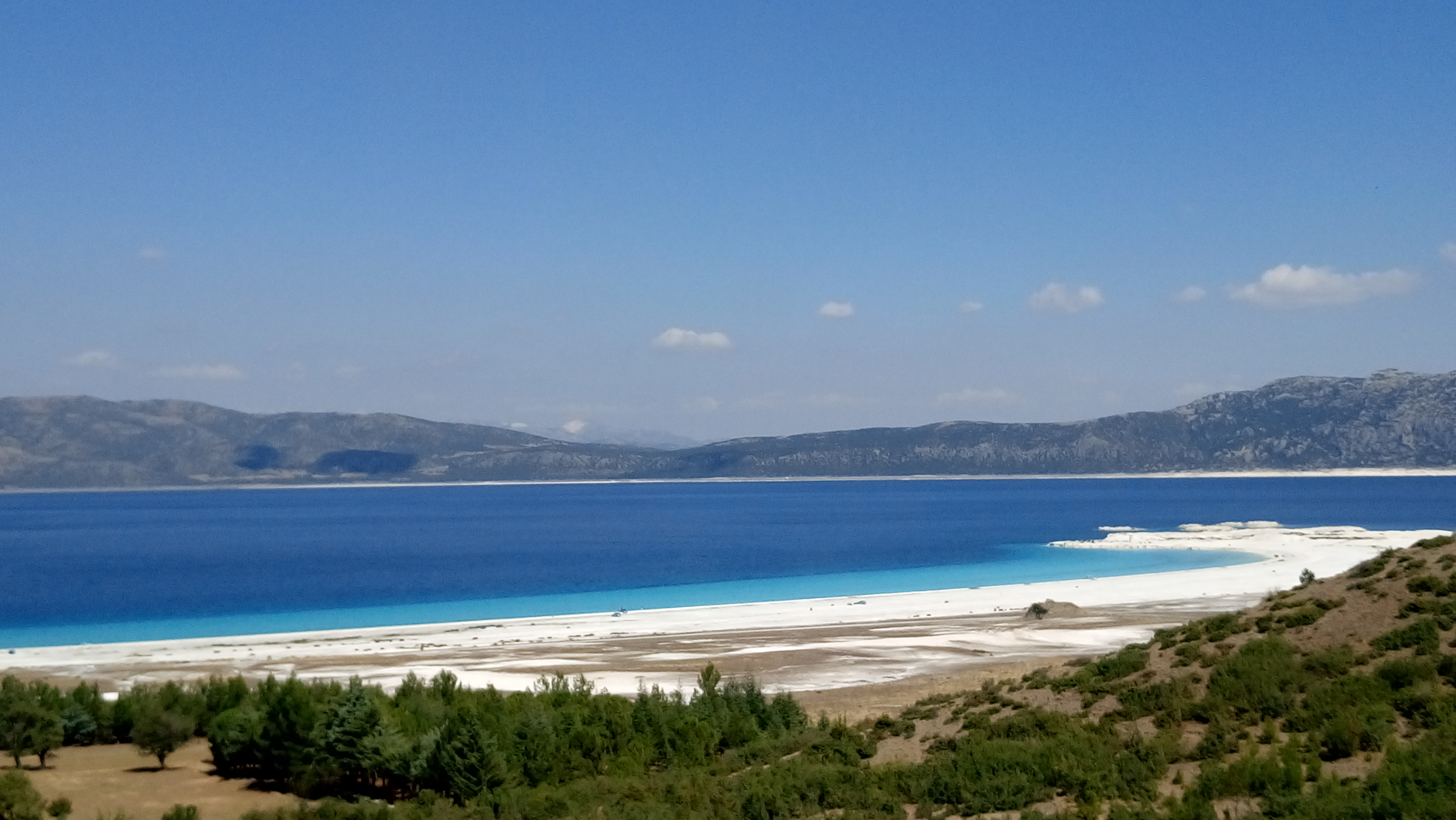
Lake Salda
Burdur Province

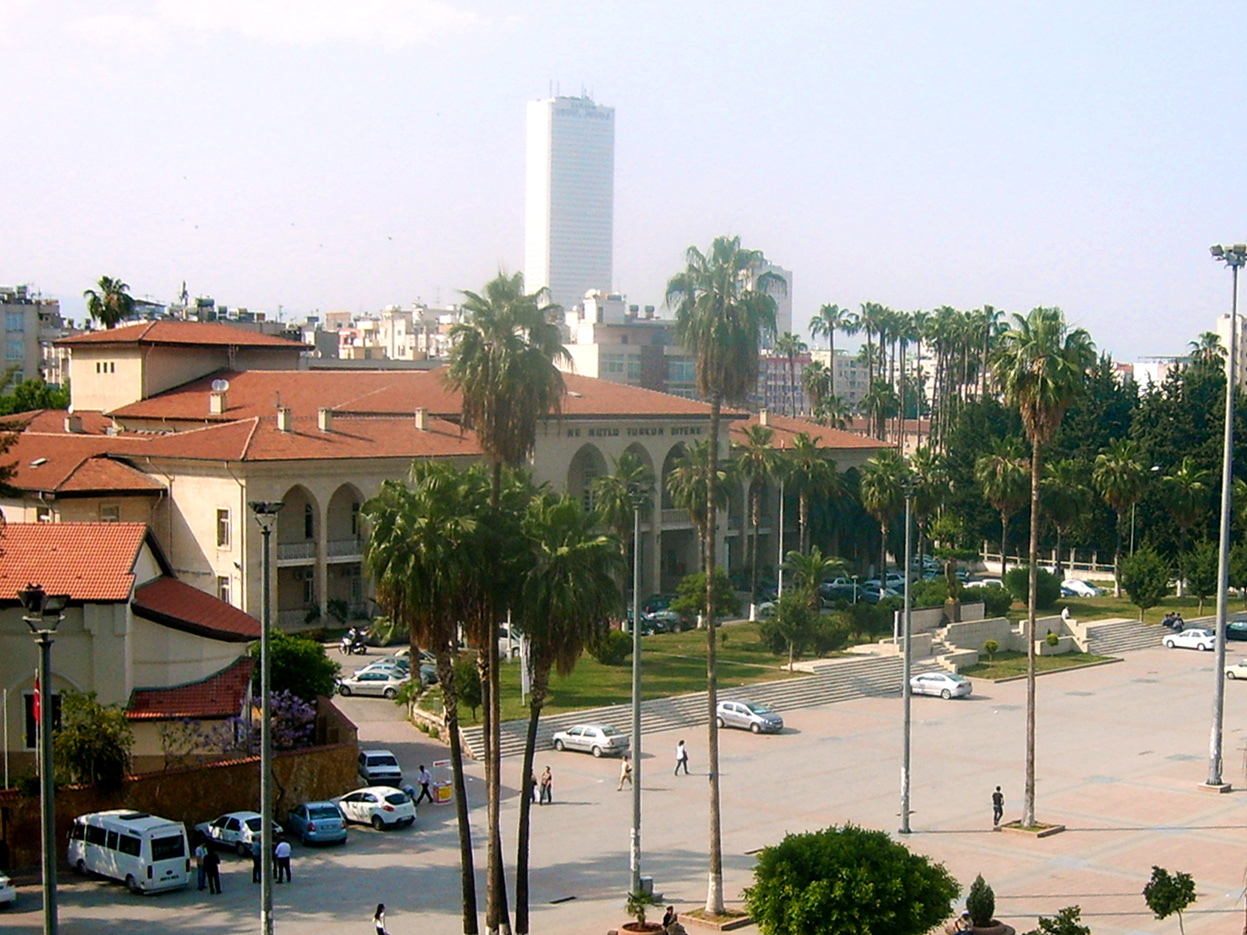
Mersin city centre

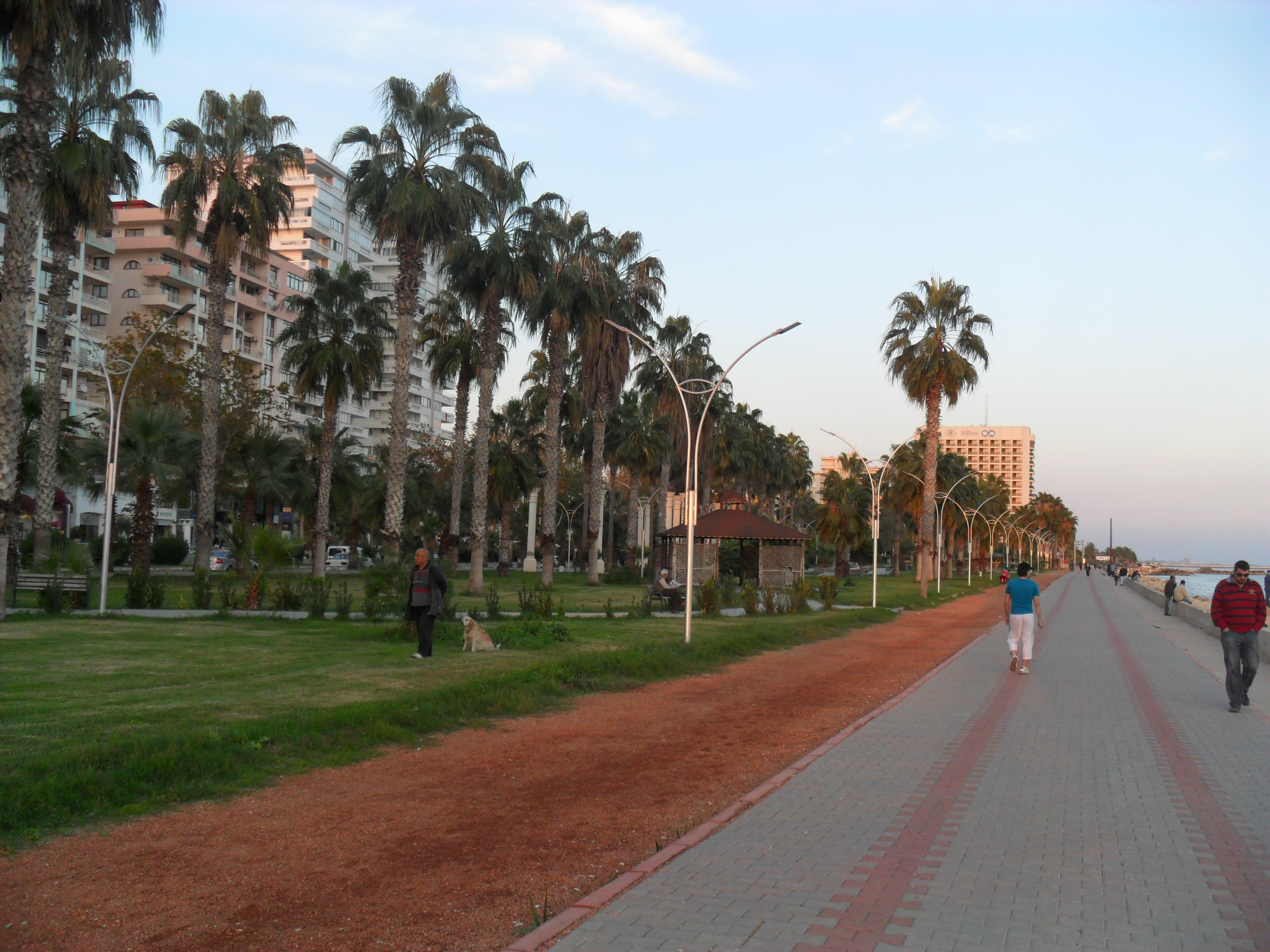
Mersin coastal promenade

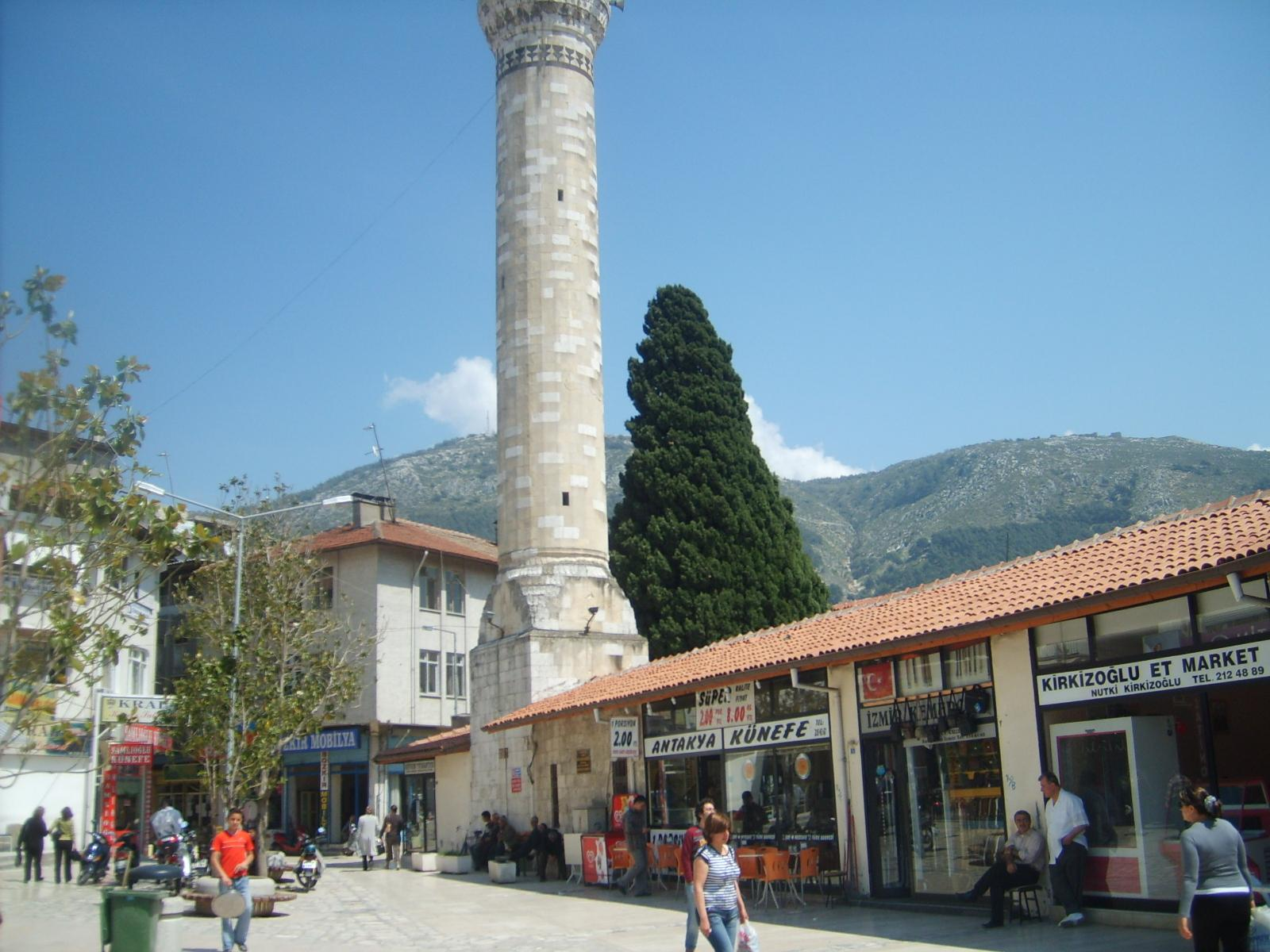
Antakya
Hatay Province

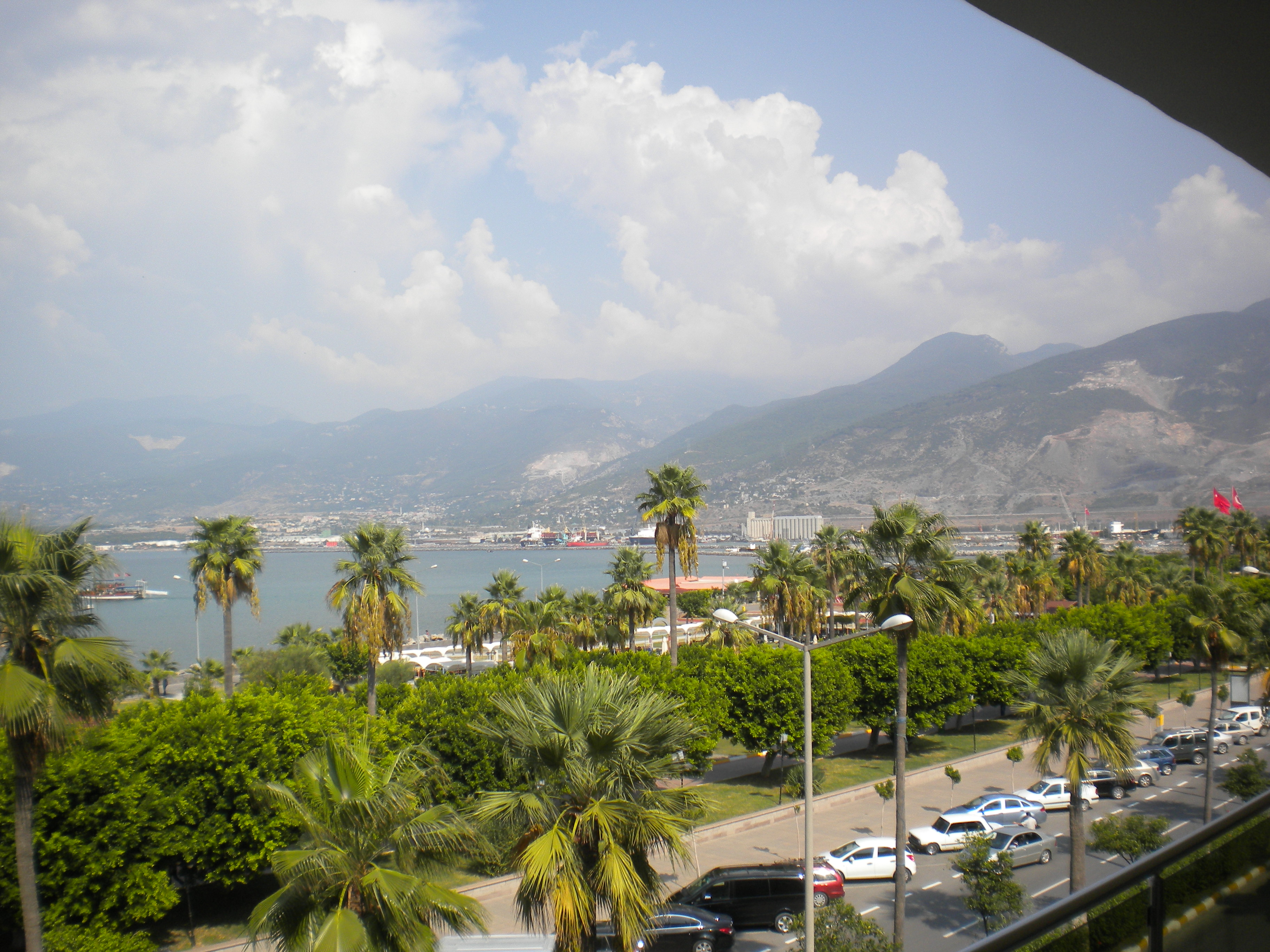
İskenderun
Hatay Province

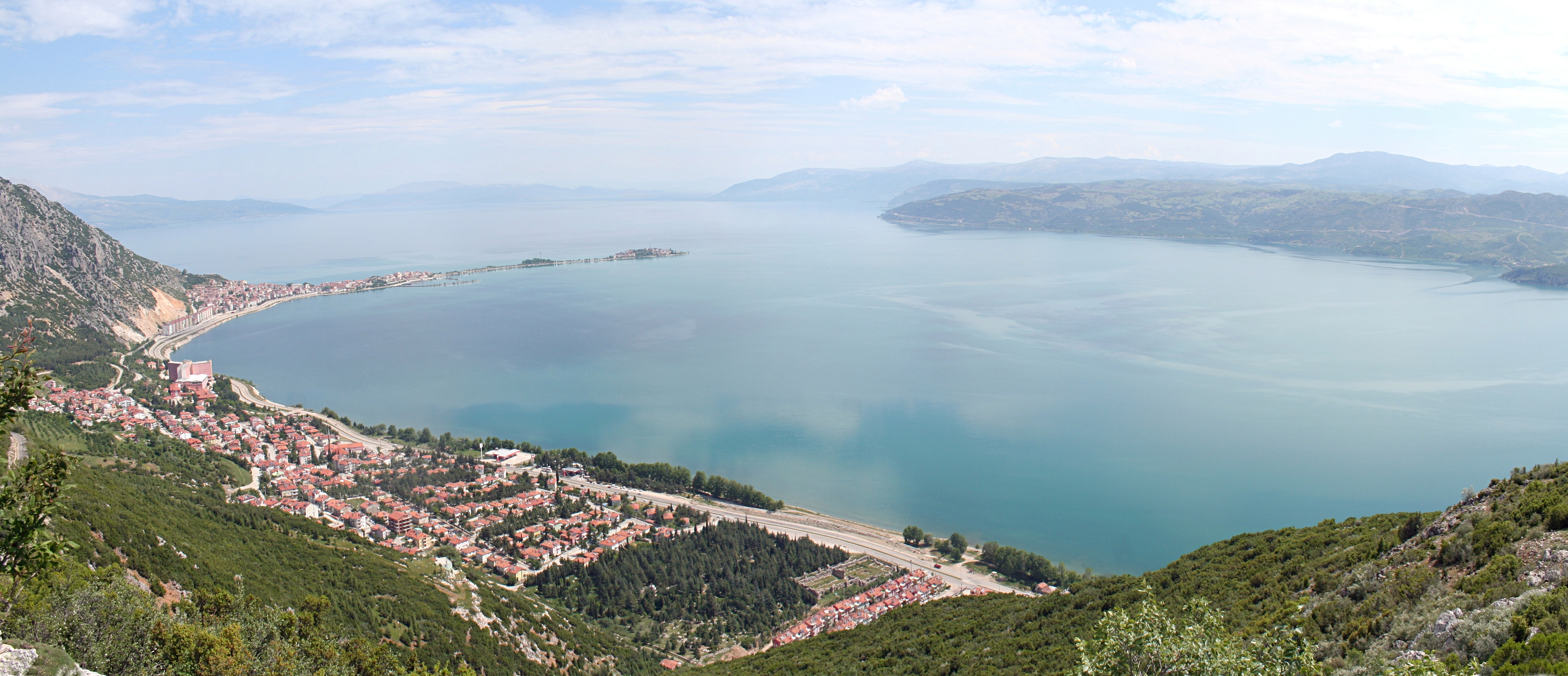
Lake Eğirdir
Isparta Province

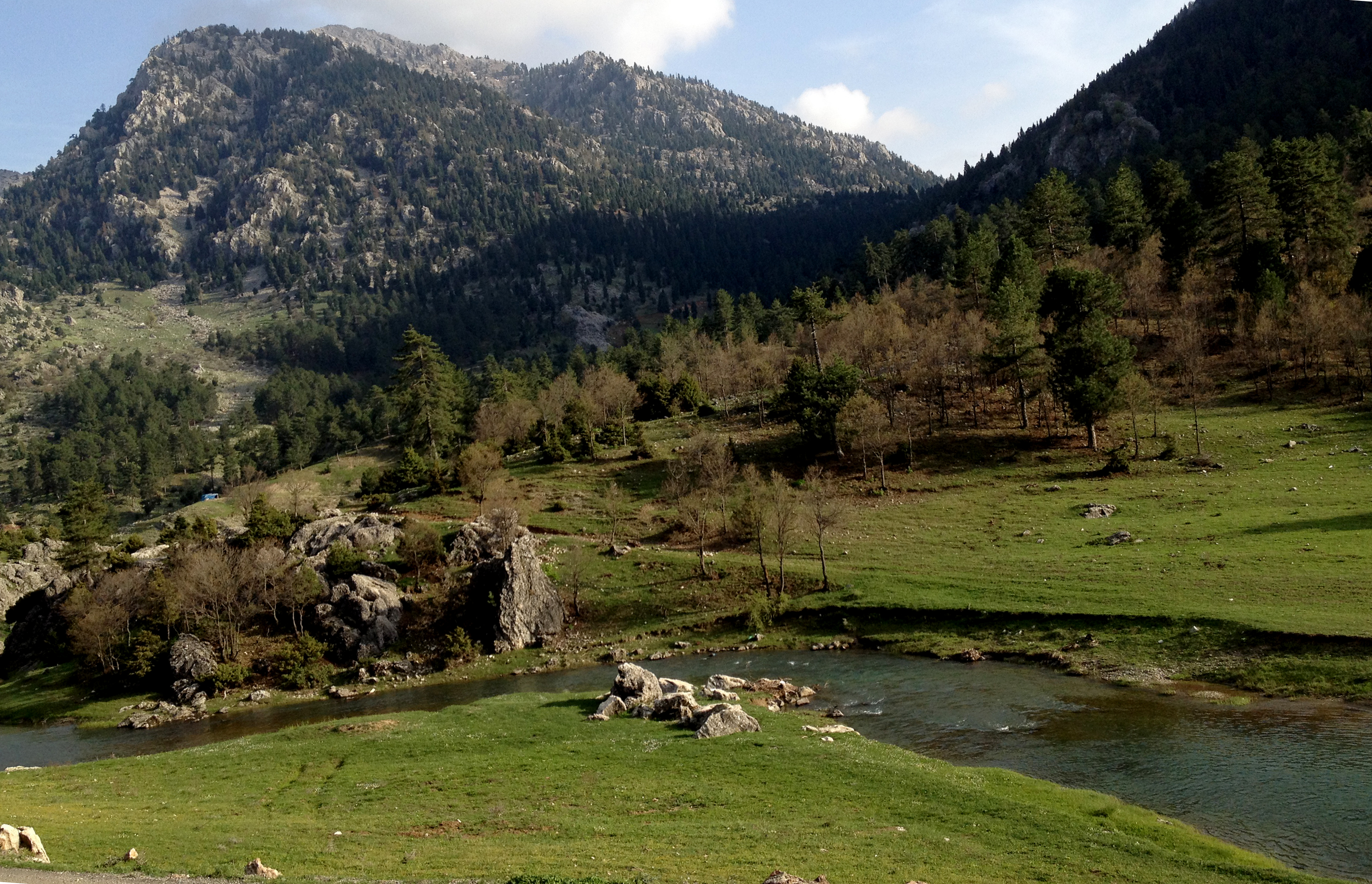
Kayaözü Creek
Kahramanmaraş Province
