= Seyhan Basin =

Seyhan Basin is a region of strategic importance for Turkey in terms of water resources, agriculture, and the economy. Geographically, it is located between the Central Anatolia and Mediterranean Regions. This basin generally has a mountainous structure, starting in the south with the flat and low Çukurova plain and continuing northward with high mountainous areas and hills after being separated by a narrow strip.

== Geographical location ==
The Seyhan Basin is situated in a wedge shape that expands northward from Çukurova. The upper part of the basin is located in Central Anatolia, while the middle and lower parts are in the Mediterranean Region. The Seyhan Basin spans between the latitudes of 36º 30' and 39º 15' north and the longitudes of 34º 45' and 37º 00' east.

== Landforms ==
The basin generally has a mountainous structure. It starts from the low and flat Çukurova plain in the south and continues northward with high mountainous areas and hilly sections. The waters of the Seyhan Basin are collected by the Göksu, Zamantı, Kürtün, Eğlence, and Çakıt rivers, along with their tributaries, which flow into the Seyhan River. The drainage area of the basin is quite extensive, covering a total area of 20,450 km^{2}. The annual water volume is estimated to be approximately 6 billion m^{3}.

== Climate ==
The climate of the basin is generally divided into three different sections. In the coastal area, summers are hot and dry, while winters are mild and rainy. In the northern regions, summers are hot and dry, but winters are cold and rainy. In the part where the Taurus Mountains extend, a wetter and colder climate is observed. The area with the highest rainfall is the upper middle section of the basin.

== Vegetation ==
The vegetation of the basin varies according to climate, geology, soil, and landforms. In the arid northern areas, grass and meadows can be found, along with occasional wild pear and oak shrubs. As one moves southward, Mediterranean climate-specific shrub and maquis communities are
