= Çatalan Dam =

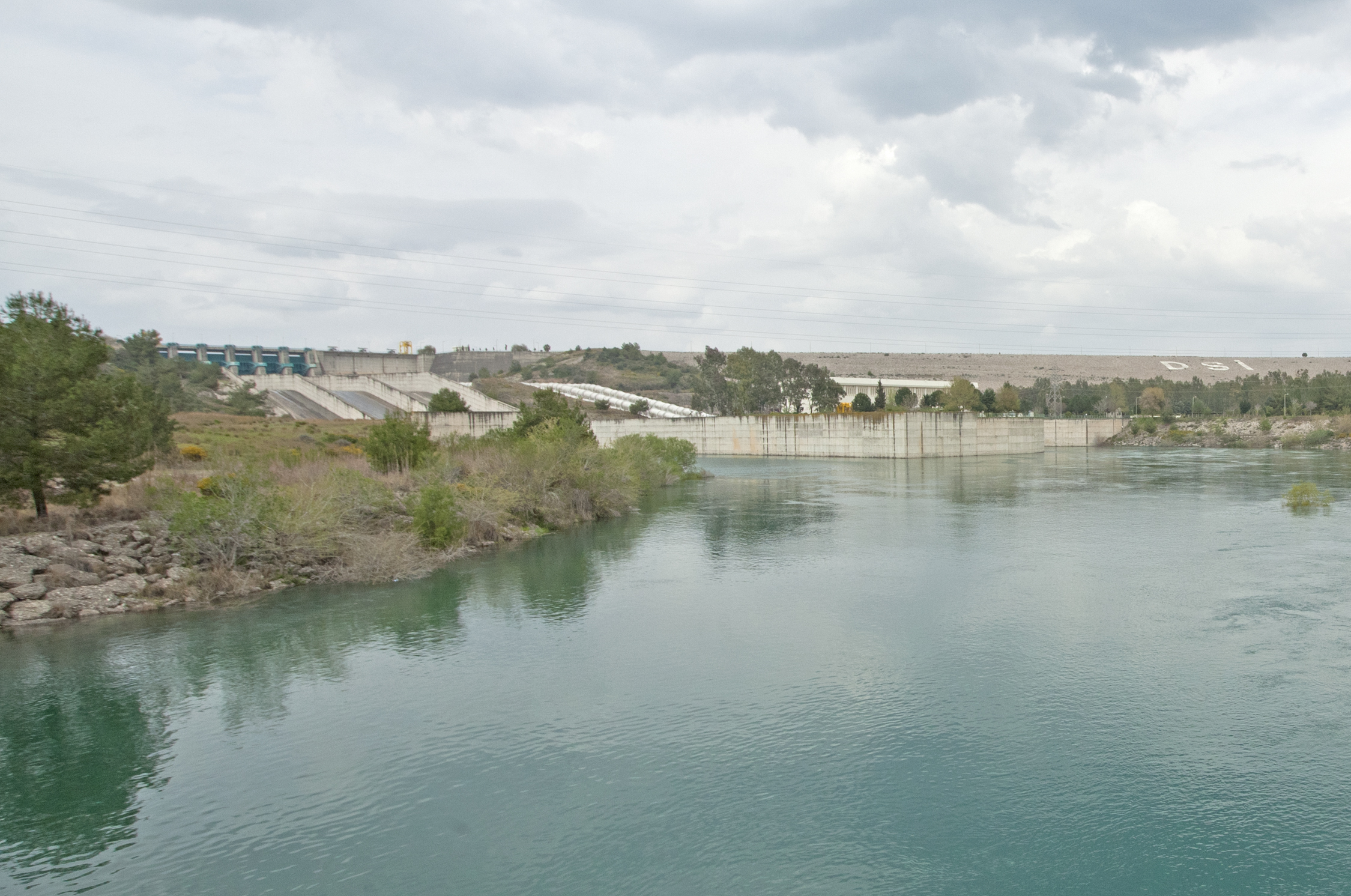

- Location within Turkey
- Location: Turkey
- Coordinates: 37°11′54″N 35°16′57″E
- Construction began: 1982
- Opening date: 1997

Dam and spillways
- Impounds: Seyhan River
- Height: 70 m (230 ft)
- Dam volume: 14,500,000 m^{3} (18,965,284 cu yd)

Reservoir
- Total capacity: 2,126,000,000 m^{3} (1,723,576 acre⋅ft)
- Surface area: 82 km^{2} (32 mi^{2})

Power Station
- Installed capacity: 169 MW
- Annual generation: 596 GWh

Çatalan Dam is an embankment dam on the Seyhan River dam in Adana Province, Turkey. It is 22 km (14 mi) north of the city of Adana. Constructed between 1982 and 1997, the development was backed by the Turkish State Hydraulic Works.

== See also ==
- Yedigöze Dam – upstream
- Seyhan Dam – downstream
- List of dams and reservoirs in Turkey
