= Seyhan River =

River in Cilicia, Turkey

Coordinates: 36°59′18″N 35°20′5″E

Seyhan Sarus
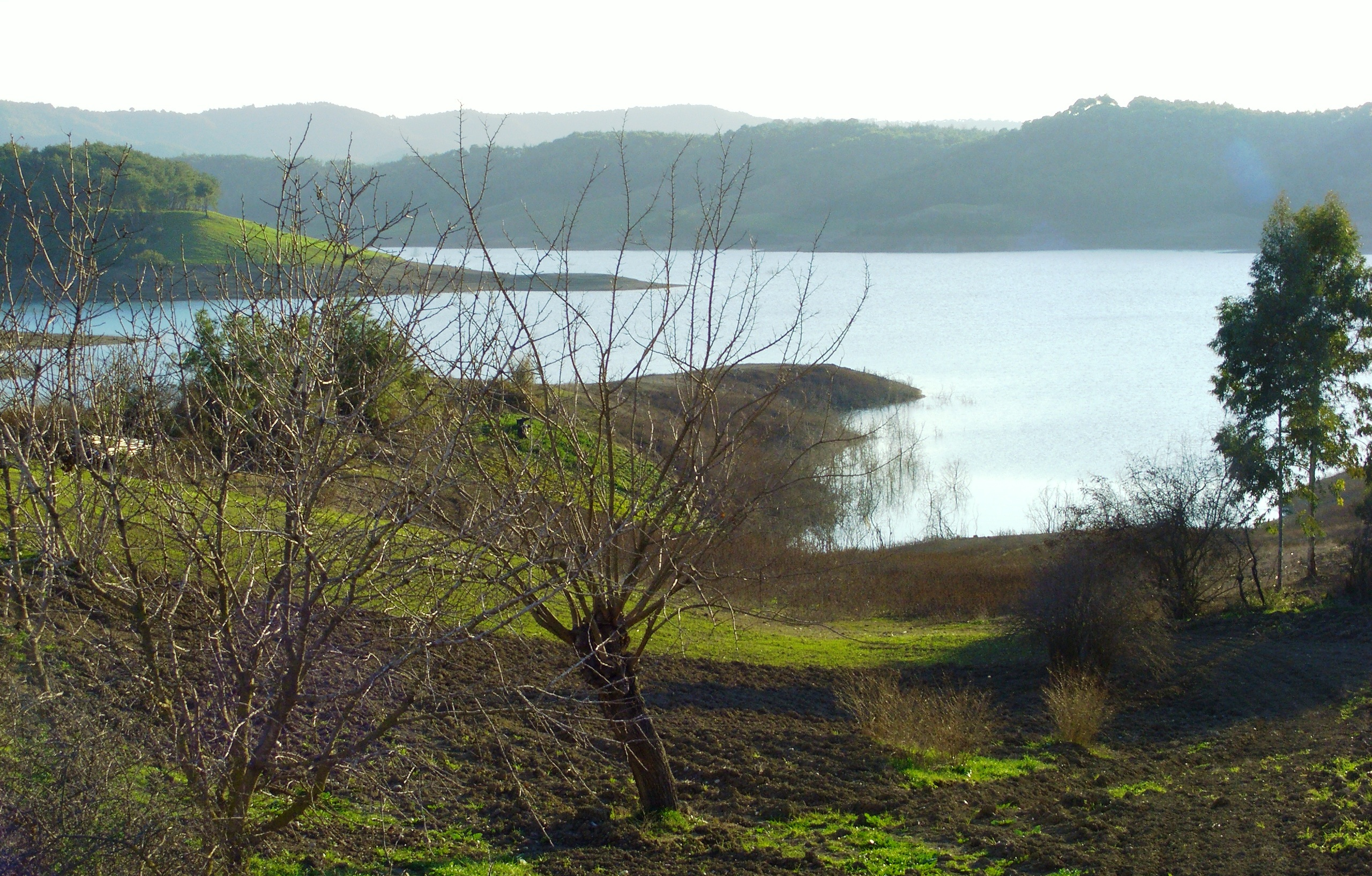
- Seyhan River flowing through Adana

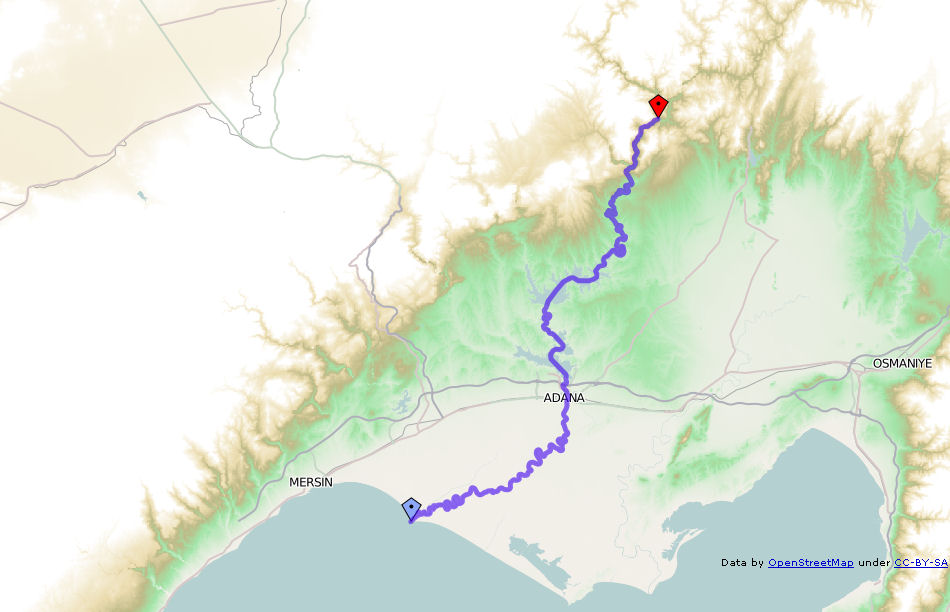
- Native name: Σάρος (Ancient Greek); Saros (Cuneiform Luwian)

Location
- Country: Turkey
- Provinces: Kayseri, Adana, Mersin
- Districts: Aladağ, Karaisalı, Çukurova, Sarıçam, Seyhan, Yüreğir, Tarsus
- Towns/Cities: Adana, ancient Augusta

Physical characteristics
- Source: Akinek Dağı
  - location: Aladağ, Adana, Turkey
  - elevation: 1,500 m (4,900 ft)
- Mouth: Cape Deli, Mediterranean Sea
  - location: Tarsus, Mersin, Turkey
- Length: 560 km (350 mi)
- Basin size: 20,450 km^{2} (7,900 sq mi)

Basin features
- Tributaries
  - left: Zamantı

The Seyhan River (formerly written Seihan, Sihun; ancient name: Ancient Greek: Σάρος, Sáros), alternatively known as Sarus (or in Turkish as Sarus Su), is the longest river of Cilicia and the longest of Turkey that flows into the Mediterranean Sea. The river is 560 kilometres (350 mi) long and flows southwest from its headwaters in the Tahtalı-Mountains (in Sivas and Kayseri provinces) in the Anti-Taurus Mountains to the Mediterranean Sea via a broad delta. Its main tributaries are Zamantı and Göksu, which unite in Aladağ, Adana to form the Seyhan River. The Zamantı River originates from the Uzun Plateau in Pınarbaşı, Kayseri and crosses Tomarza, Develi and Yahyalı districts in Kayseri.

Its sources were reported being in the Taurus Mountains in Cataonia. It flowed through Cappadocia by the town of Comana, then through Cilicia. It is noted by numerous ancient authors including Livy, Xenophon, Procopius, Strabo, Ptolemy, Appian, Pliny the Elder, and Eustathius of Thessalonica who erroneously calls it Sinarus.

At 50 kilometres (31 mi) from its mouth, Seyhan River flows through the city of Adana, the only settlement situated on the river. Several bridges and footbridges cross the river in Adana including the Stone Bridge, a 2nd-century Roman bridge. Ancient city of Augusta was also situated on the river, corresponding today to the east side of the Çatalan reservoir. The river meets the Mediterranean Sea at Cape Deli. Its basin is the mountainous Seyhan Basin.

== History ==
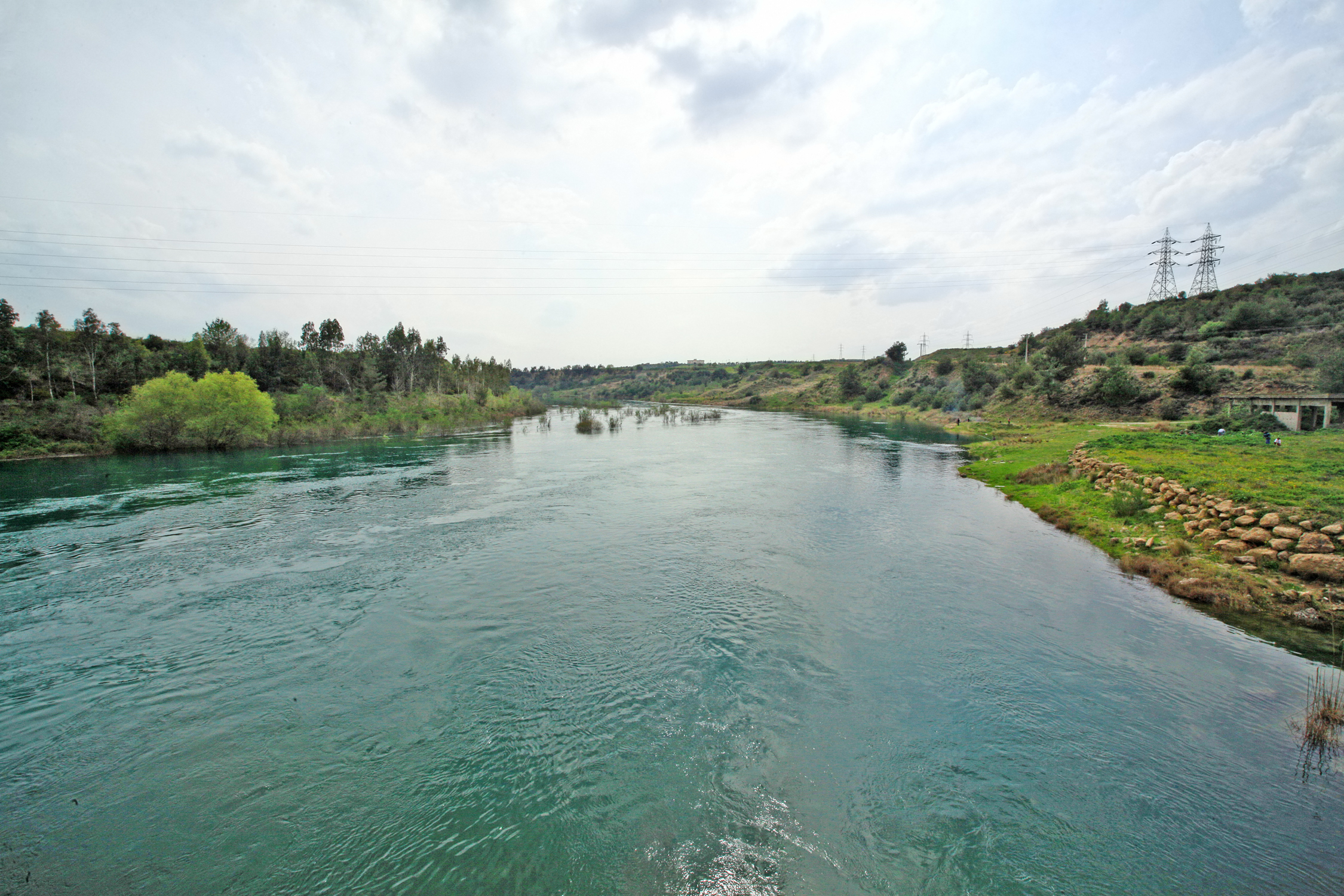
River Seyhan seen from Çatalan Bridge

An ancient Greco-Roman legend mentions that the name of the city of Adana originates from Adanus, the son of the Greek god Uranus and Gaea, who founded the city next to the river Sarus, or Sihon.

Originally, the River Sarus flowed from the mountains, became the Seyhan River whilst passing through Cilicia and then onwards to the Mediterranean Sea.

In 2009, a total of 33 fish species were listed as being found in the Seyhan River, including 29 native, 3 introduced and 4 endemic species. Eight amphibians were listed and two of them (Rana holtzi and Triturus vittatus cilicensis) are known to be endemic to the river.

The major Seyhan Dam upstream of Adana serves for irrigation, hydroelectric power, and flood control. Yedigöze, Çatalan and Kavşak Bendi are the other dams on Seyhan River which also serve the same purposes. The river is currently under extensive development for hydroelectric power and irrigation.

== See also ==
- Stone Bridge (Adana)
