= Seyhan Dam =

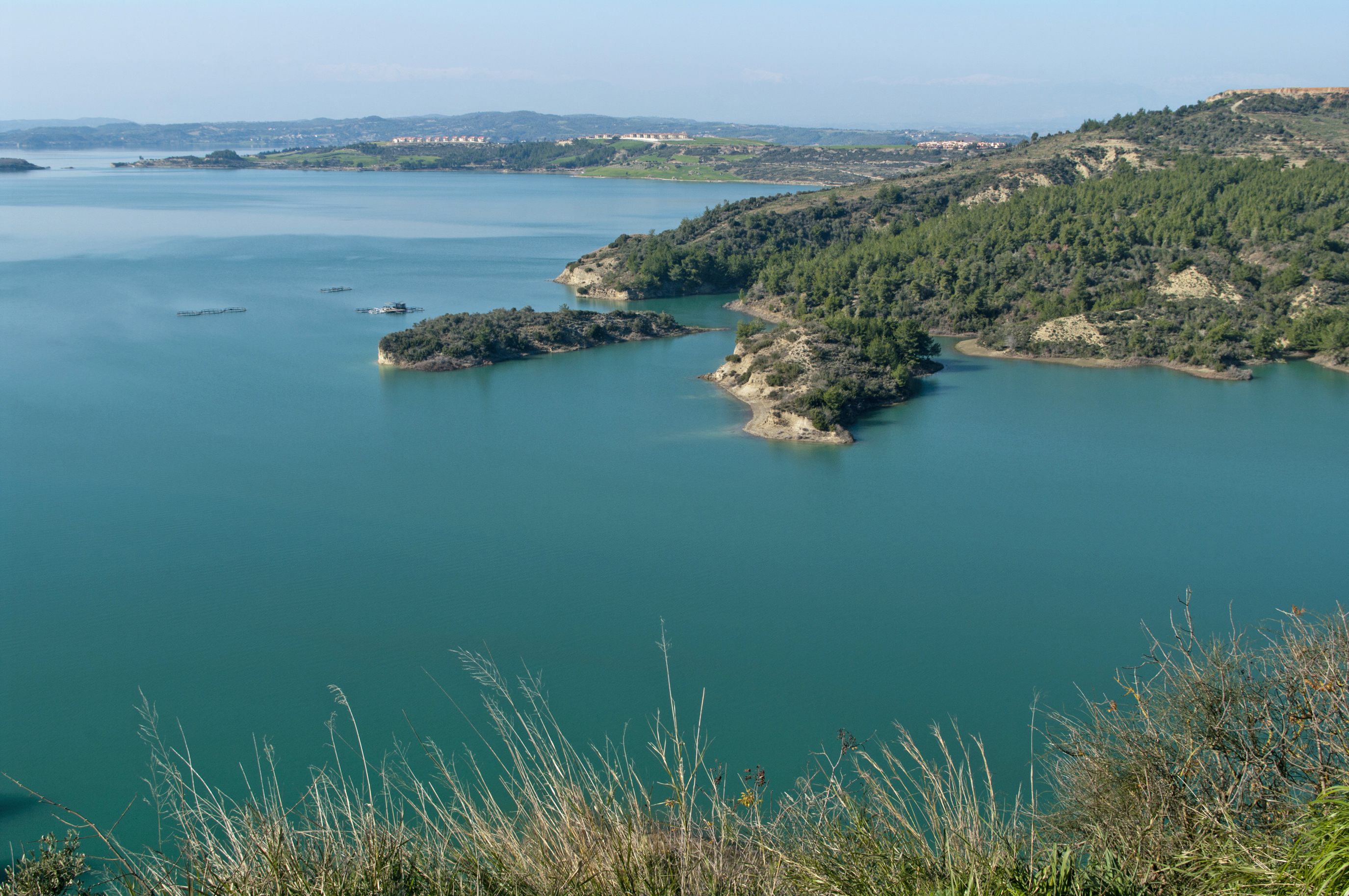

- Location within Turkey
- Country: Turkey
- Location: Adana
- Coordinates: 37°02′24″N 35°19′55″E
- Status: Operational
- Construction began: 1953
- Opening date: 1956

Dam and spillways
- Type of dam: Embankment
- Impounds: Seyhan River
- Height: 53 m (174 ft)
- Dam volume: 7,500,000 m^{3} (9,809,630 cu yd)

Reservoir
- Total capacity: 750,000,000 m^{3} (608,035 acre⋅ft)
- Surface area: 68 km^{2} (26 mi^{2})

Power Station
- Installed capacity: 59 MW
- Annual generation: 350 GWh

The Seyhan Dam is a hydroelectric dam on the Seyhan River north of Adana, Turkey.

The dam was constructed in the 1950s as the first in a series of hydroelectric projects funded by the World Bank. The project was authorized by Prime Minister Adnan Menderes. The project manager was Süleyman Demirel, who later became prime minister and the ninth president of Turkey.

In 1955, the Roman city of Augusta was discovered during the construction of the dam. It was partially excavated before being flooded by the dam's lake. Parts of the city are visible when the water level in the lake is low.

== See also ==
- Çatalan Dam – upstream
