= Kavşak Bendi Dam =

- Location within Turkey
- Official name: Kavşak Bendi Barajı ve HES
- Country: Turkey
- Location: Kozan/Aladağ
- Coordinates: 37°33′45.28″N 35°31′45.84″E
- Status: Operational
- Construction began: 2008
- Opening date: 2013
- Owner: Enerjisa Power Generation Inc.

Dam and spillways
- Type of dam: Embankment, concrete-face rock-fill
- Impounds: Seyhan River
- Height (foundation): 88 m (289 ft)
- Height (thalweg): 73 m (240 ft)
- Length: 186 m (610 ft)
- Elevation at crest: 323 m (1,060 ft)
- Width (crest): 8 m (26 ft)
- Dam volume: 1,215,000 m^{3} (1,589,160 cu yd)
- Spillway type: Controlled
- Spillway capacity: 5,053 m^{3}/s (178,400 cu ft/s)

Reservoir
- Creates: Kavşak Bendi Reservoir
- Total capacity: 30,000,000 m^{3} (24,321 acre⋅ft)
- Active capacity: 7,560,000 m^{3} (6,129 acre⋅ft)
- Catchment area: 13,200 km^{2} (5,097 mi^{2})
- Surface area: 1.42 km^{2} (1 mi^{2})
- Maximum length: 11 km (7 mi)
- Normal elevation: 318 m (1,043 ft)

Kavşak Bendi Hydroelectric Station
- Coordinates: 37°32′19.83″N 35°31′29.90″E
- Commission date: 2013-2014
- Type: Conventional, diversion
- Hydraulic head: 84.81 m (278 ft) (net)
- Turbines: 3 x 59 MW Francis-type
- Installed capacity: 177 MW
- Annual generation: 741 Gwh

The Kavşak Bendi Dam is a concrete-face rock-fill dam on the Seyhan River bordering Kozan and Aladağ districts in Adana Province, Turkey. Construction on the dam began in 2008 and the first generator was commissioned in 2013. The two remaining generators were commissioned by April 2014. The primary purpose of the dam is hydroelectric power generation. Water is sent about 2.5 km (1.6 mi) downstream where it meets the power station which contains three 59 MW Francis turbine-generators.

== See also ==
- Köprü Dam – upstream on the Göksu River
- Yedigöze Dam – downstream
