= Yedigöze Dam =

- Location within Turkey
- Official name: Yedigöze Barajı ve HES
- Country: Turkey
- Location: İmamoğlu/Aladağ, Adana Province
- Coordinates: 37°24′05.42″N 35°26′43.07″E
- Purpose: Power, irrigation
- Status: Operational
- Construction began: 2007
- Opening date: 2010
- Owners: Yedigöze Electricity Production and Trading Co., Ltd. (Sanko Holding)

Dam and spillways
- Type of dam: Embankment, concrete-face rock-fill
- Impounds: Seyhan River
- Height (foundation): 131 m (430 ft)
- Height (thalweg): 105 m (344 ft)
- Spillway type: Controlled chute

Reservoir
- Creates: Yedigöze Reservoir
- Total capacity: 642,800,000 m^{3} (521,126 acre⋅ft)
- Surface area: 14.9 km^{2} (6 mi^{2})

Power Station
- Commission date: 2011
- Turbines: 2 x 160 MW Francis-type
- Installed capacity: 320 MW
- Annual generation: 1000 Gwh

The Yedigöze Dam, also known as Sani Bey Dam, is a concrete-face rock-fill dam on the Seyhan River bordering İmamoğlu and Aladağ districts in Adana Province, Turkey. The primary purpose of the dam is hydroelectric power generation and irrigation. The dam's power station has an installed capacity of 320 MW and the reservoir will help irrigate 75,000 ha (190,000 acres). Construction began in 2007 and the river was diverted by 2008. In the same year construction on the actual dam began and the reservoir began to fill on 15 June 2010. By November 2010 the remaining construction work was complete and the generators were commissioned in 2011. Construction on the irrigation works is ongoing.

== See also ==
- Kavşak Bendi Dam – upstream
- Çatalan Dam – downstream
