= Zamantı River =

Coordinates: 37°36′23″N 35°35′07″E

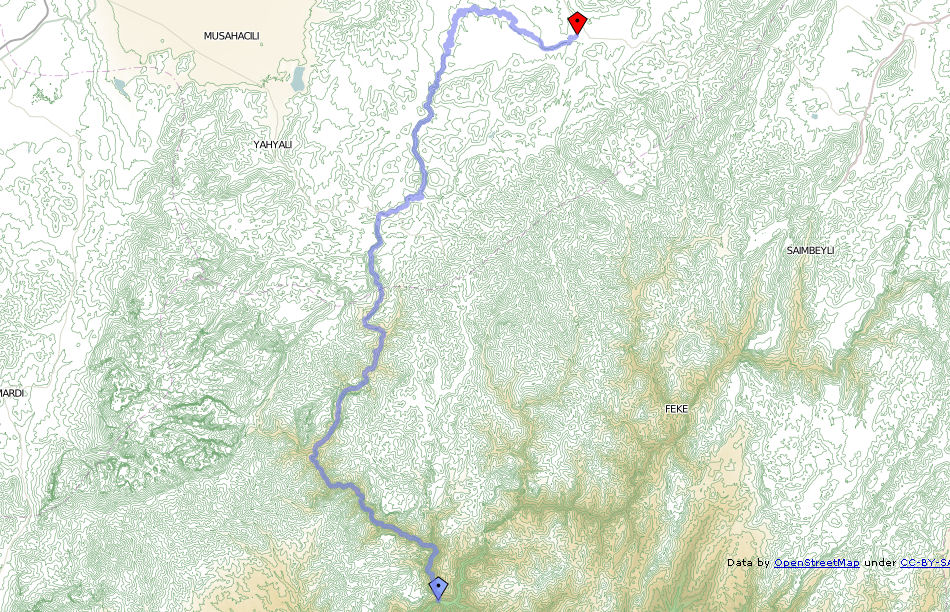
- Zamantı River

Location
- Country: Turkey

Physical characteristics
- Source
  - location: Pınarbaşı near Kayseri
- Mouth
  - location: Central Anatolia, Turkey
  - elevation: 0 m (0 ft)
- Length: 308 km (191 mi)

Zamantı River is a river in Central Anatolia, Turkey, crossing Kayseri Province in practically its whole course to join Seyhan River further south, of which it is the western, the longest and the most important tributary. Zamantı and Göksu join 80 km north of Adana to form Seyhan River.

== Etymology ==
According to Ramsay, the modern name of the river derives from the town of Tzamandos and translates to "the water that comes from Tzamandos". Through the Classical Antiquity until Byzantine times, the river was called Karmalas. In Byzantine times, the river was known as Onopniktes.

== Geography ==
Tracing a curvy course through the narrow valleys and cascades of the Taurus Mountains (called Aladağlar in this section), the river is one of the most favorite rafting spots in Turkey, particularly in its section around the town of Yahyalı, rated 3 in the international scale from 1 to 6 .

A 500 km^{2} area along the river basin corresponds to Aladağlar National Park, mostly covered in forests and extending within Yahyalı (Kayseri Province), Çamardı (Niğde Province) and Aladağ (Adana Province) districts. A dozen peaks exceeding 3,000 meters also surround the river, making a prized destination among alpinists.
