= Stone Bridge (Adana) =

Taşköprü
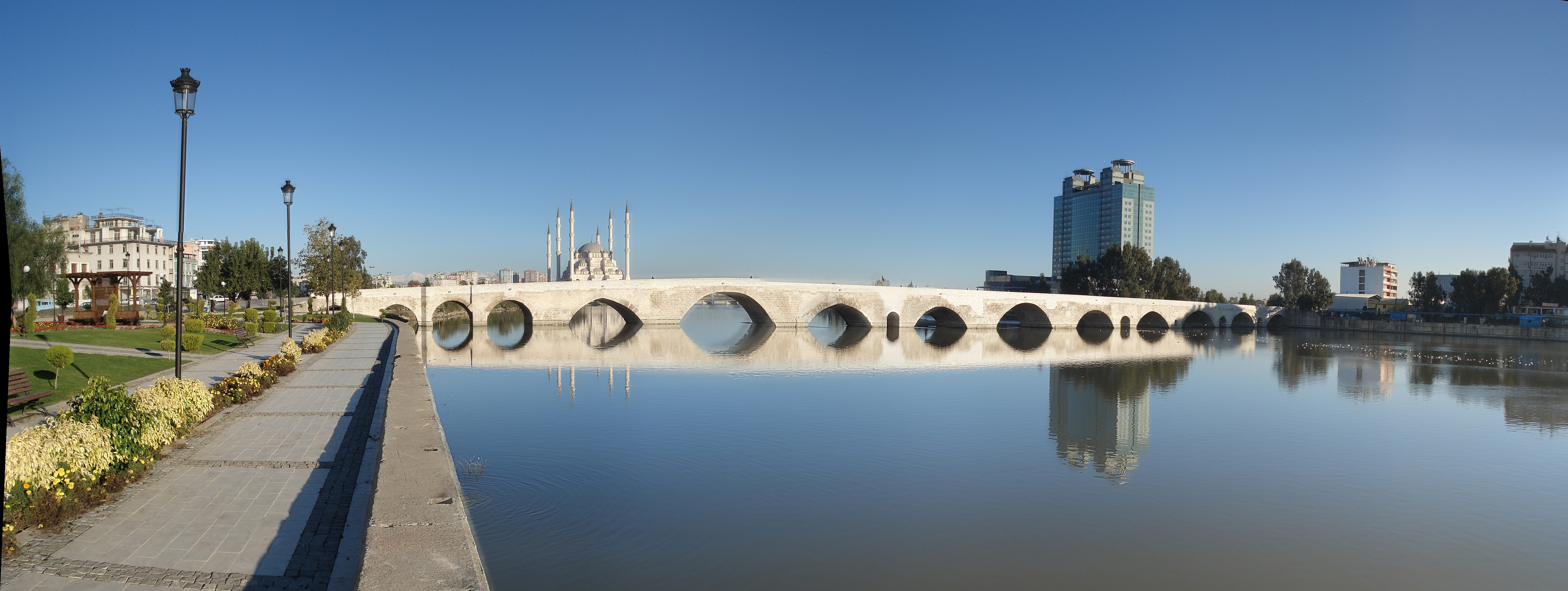
- Coordinates: 36.986111°N 35.335278°E
- Crosses: Seyhan River
- Locale: Adana, Cilicia region, Turkey
- Official name: Taşköprü

Characteristics
- Design: arch bridge
- Material: Tufa, marble, spolia
- Total length: 310 m (1,020 ft)
- Width: 11.4 m (37 ft)
- No. of spans: originally 21 arches

History
- Construction end: AD 120–135?

Statistics
- Daily traffic: pedestrians (previously also vehicles, until 2007)

Taşköprü (Italian: Ponte in pietra, English: Stone bridge), historically known as Ponte Sarus, is a Roman bridge spanning the Seyhan River in Adana that was probably built in the first half of the second century AD. The bridge was a key link in ancient trade routes from the Mediterranean Sea to Anatolia and Persia. Until its closure in 2007, it was one of the oldest bridges in the world open to motorized vehicles. Since 2007 it has only carried foot traffic, and now hosts social and cultural events.

Among the names used for the bridge during its history are the Saros Bridge, the Bridge of Justinian, the al-Walid Bridge and Taşköprü ("Stone Bridge" in Turkish).

== History ==
Taşköprü carries traces of additions and restorations by several civilizations. The Hittite king Hattusili I is reported to have built a bridge in Adana en route to a military campaign in Syria, although it is not clear whether this was Adana's first bridge across the Seyhan River (then known as the Sarus).

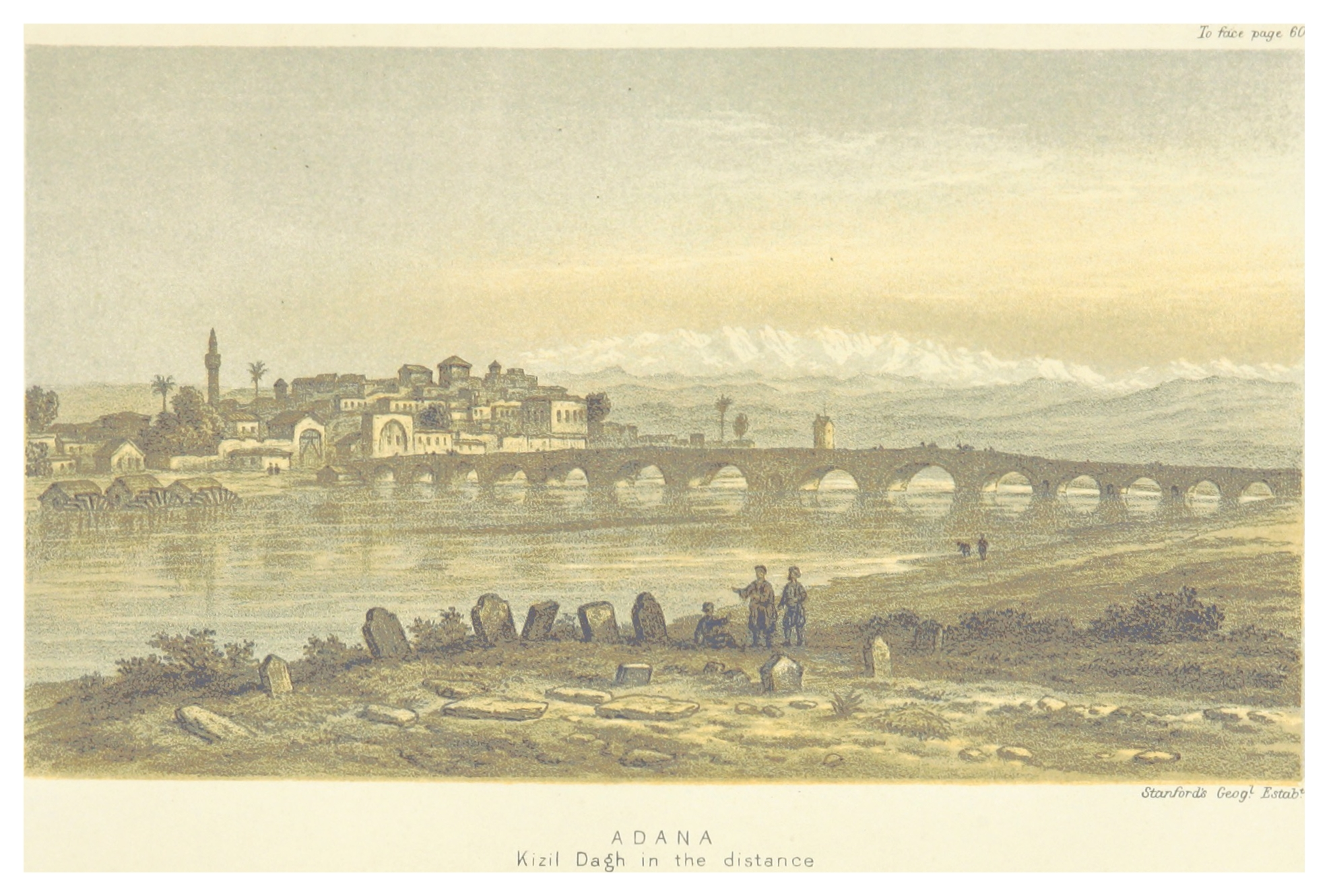
Taşköprü, with Adana and the Kizildag mountains, from a view by Edwin John Davis published in Life in Asiatic Turkey in 1879.

Victor Langlois, who visited Adana in 1852–1853, attributes the current bridge to the Emperor Hadrian, who ruled from AD 117 to 138 and traveled through Anatolia between 120 and 135, commissioning buildings in many places. Langlois reported that the bridge had borne an inscription with Hadrian's name until about twenty years before his visit.

Some accounts trace the construction to a late 4th-century Roman architect named Auxentius, who also built a bridge in Rome in 384. This attribution is based on an inscription in Greek that served for a while as the altar of Adana's Greek church and is now in the Adana Archeological Museum collection of stone carvings. The 12-line inscription is written on a slab 122 cm (48 in) high, 93 cm (37 in) wide and 12 cm (5 in) thick. However, a full reading appears to link this inscription to an aqueduct feeding waterwheels and not to the construction of the bridge.

The historian Procopius of Caesarea records in the Buildings of Justinian, written in about 557, that Justinian I, who ruled 527–565, ordered the rebuilding of the bridge:

The portion of this masonry [of the piers] which chanced to be below the water and so was constantly battered by its powerful current had, in a space of time beyond reckoning, come to be mostly destroyed. So the whole bridge appeared likely after no long time to fall into the river. It had come to be always the prayer of each man who crossed the bridge that it might remain firm if only during the moment of his crossing. But the Emperor Justinian dug another channel for the river and forced it to change its course temporarily; and then getting the masonry which I have just mentioned free from the water and removing the damaged portions, he rebuilt them without any delay and then returned the river to its former path, which they call the "bed". Thus then were these things done.

The bridge has been restored many times over the centuries. After a restoration in 742, during the Umayyad period, it was renamed Jisr al-Walid after the ruling caliph, al-Walid II. There was another restoration in 840, during the reign of Caliph al-Mu'tasim. Other sources report work undertaken under caliphs Harun al-Rashid and al-Ma'mun. There is no written record of another restoration until the 17th century.

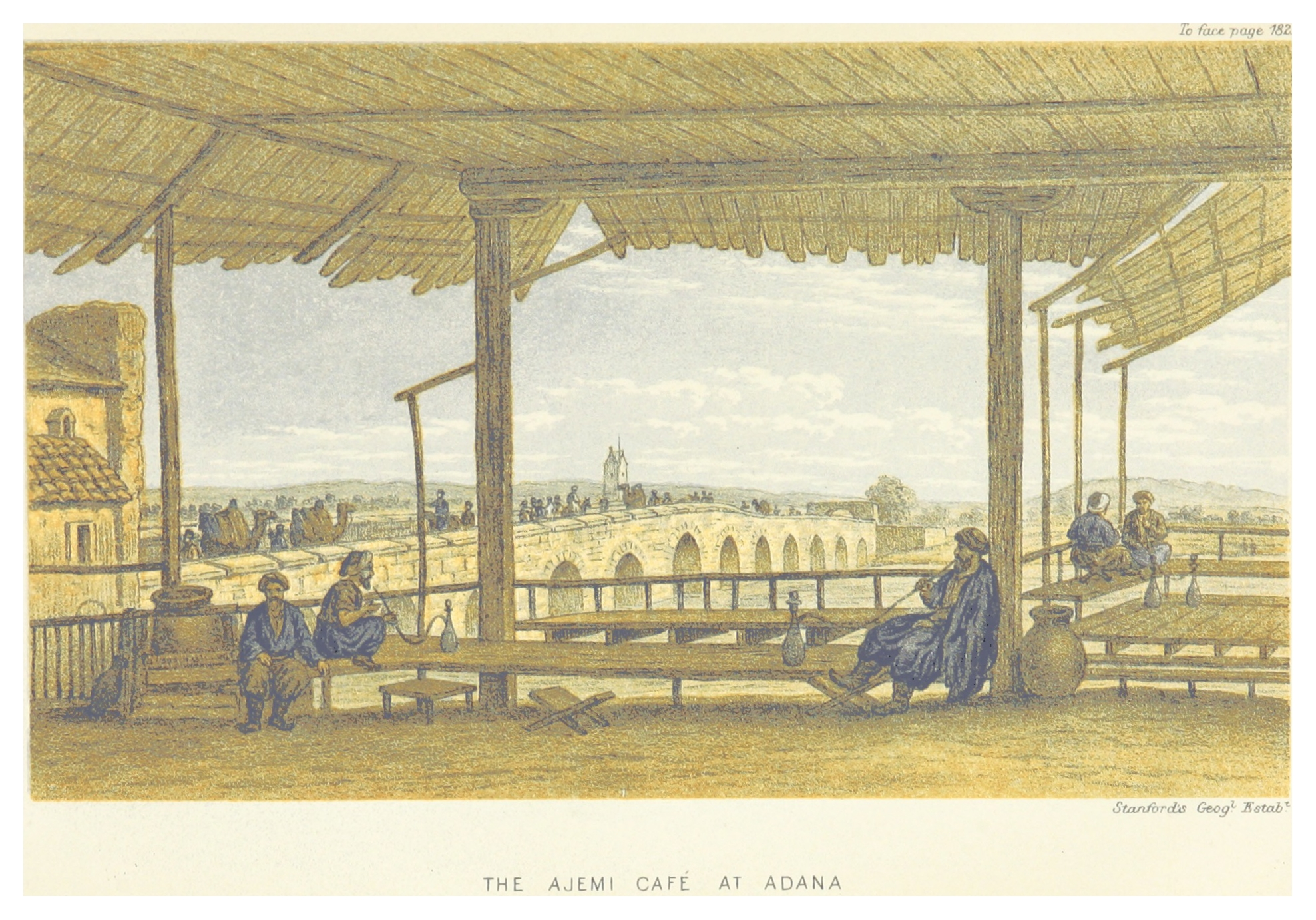
The Ajemi café with Taşköprü in the background, also by Edwin John Davis.

The bridge was repaired several times during the Ottoman period. The oldest recorded Ottoman repair was during the reign of Ahmet III in 1713. An edict issued by Osman Pasha, the governor of Adana under Ahmet III, commanding the repair of the older parts of the bridge survives in the records of the Adana Shari'a Court.

Adana Ethnography Museum houses an inscription (Inventory Nos. 505 and 506) placed on the bridge after restoration work in 1847, during the reign of Ottoman Sultan Abdülmecid I. This states that the bridge needed rebuilding after being in bad condition for a long while. Further restoration work was commissioned by Governor Osman Pasha during the reign of Sultan Abdul Hamid II, as recorded by an inscription at the Adana Archeological Museum (Inventory No. 2469). A salname (official yearbook) from the reign of Abdülhamid II explains the status of the bridge and the restorations:

On the mentioned Seyhan River, there is a large, solidly built, orderly bridge of 22 arches. This bridge is a rare sample of elegance and over the course of time had its sidewalks and some of its arches worn out, thus a neat sidewalk with walls has been built to prevent people and animals from falling and being killed. The arches have also been carefully renovated.

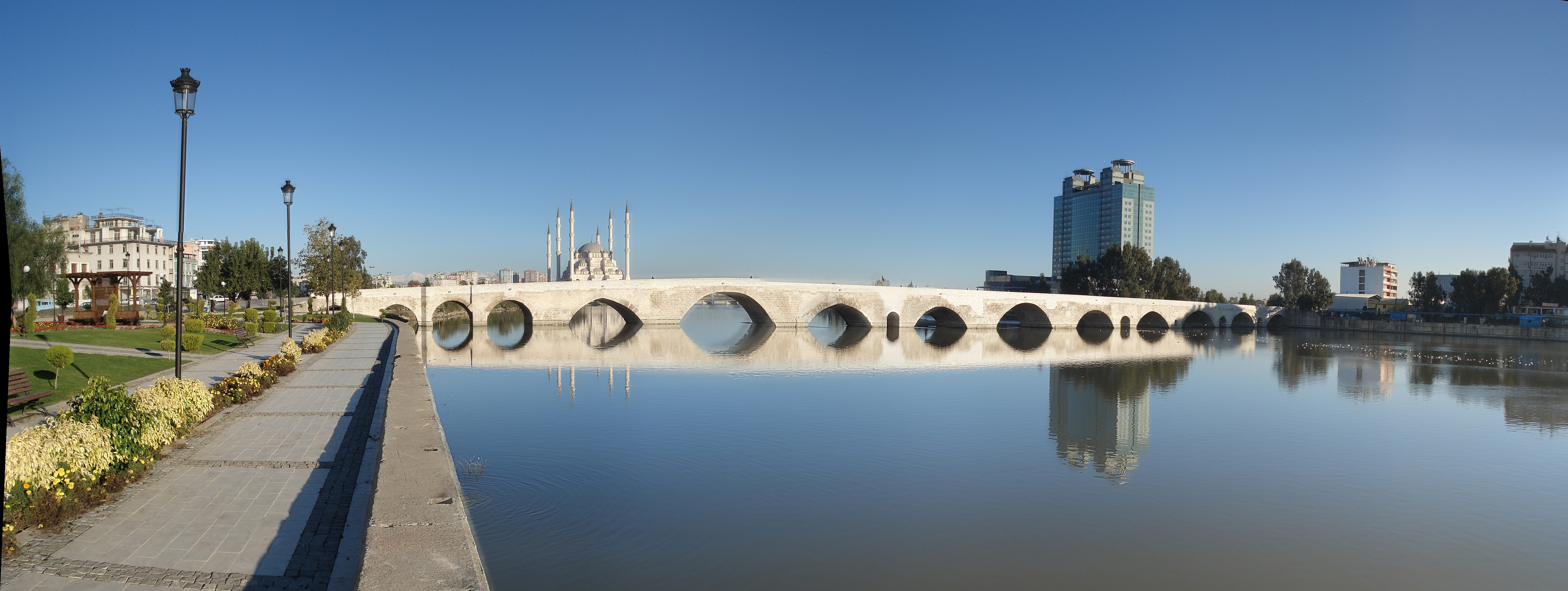
Panoramic view of Taşköprü.

When cotton cultivation expanded following Ibrahim Pasha of Egypt's rule over Cilicia in the mid 19th-century, migrant workers would gather on Taşköprü for a weekly labor market during the spring months to be hired by overseers for casual labor in the region's fields. This made the bridge so crowded that Adana residents were unable to cross it.

== Architecture ==
Although a variety of materials have been used throughout the many periods of construction and restoration, the bridge was generally built of tufa, marble and spolia. The eastern section of the bridge in particular bears many marks of the original construction. The bridge was constructed using the wall-filling technique.

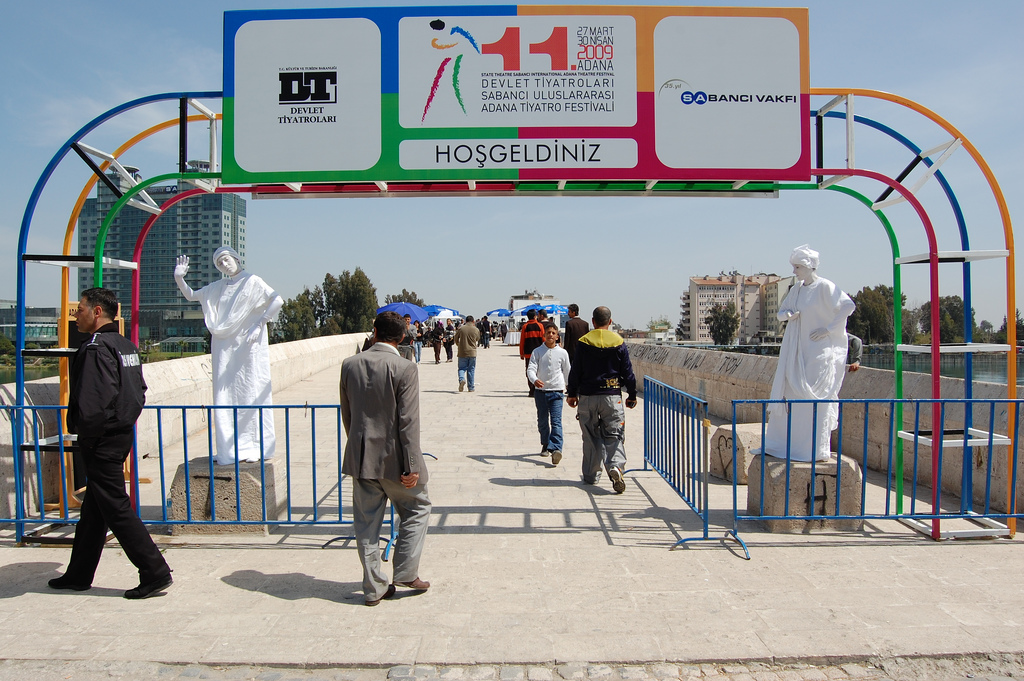
Taşköprü hosting the opening ceremony of the Sabancı Theater Festival in spring 2009

The current length of the bridge is 310 metres (1,020 ft). The Ottoman traveler Evliya Çelebi recorded a length of 550 feet (170 m) at the time of his visit. The bridge has 21 arches: 15 primary arches to carry the deck across the river and six small relieving arches within the larger piers. The bridge was shortened as portions of the approach at either end were buried during work to stabilize the river banks. The roadway is paved with cobblestones and is 11.4 metres (37 ft) wide, including the sidewalks. The bridge's sculptural decoration includes a lion relief on the north side of the 11th arch, and various star-and-crescent artwork.

Engravings published in the accounts of travelers to the Ottoman Empire depict the roadway as too narrow to accommodate two horse carriages side by side. It is thought that the deck was originally no more than 3 metres (10 ft) across and was widened in the early 20th century. As a result of the widening work, new arches were added to the downstream side of the bridge. It is unclear when these additions are made, but there are records of an extensive restoration by the State Highway Agency in 1948. After the additions, the width of the roadway was extended to about 8–8.5 metres (26–28 ft).

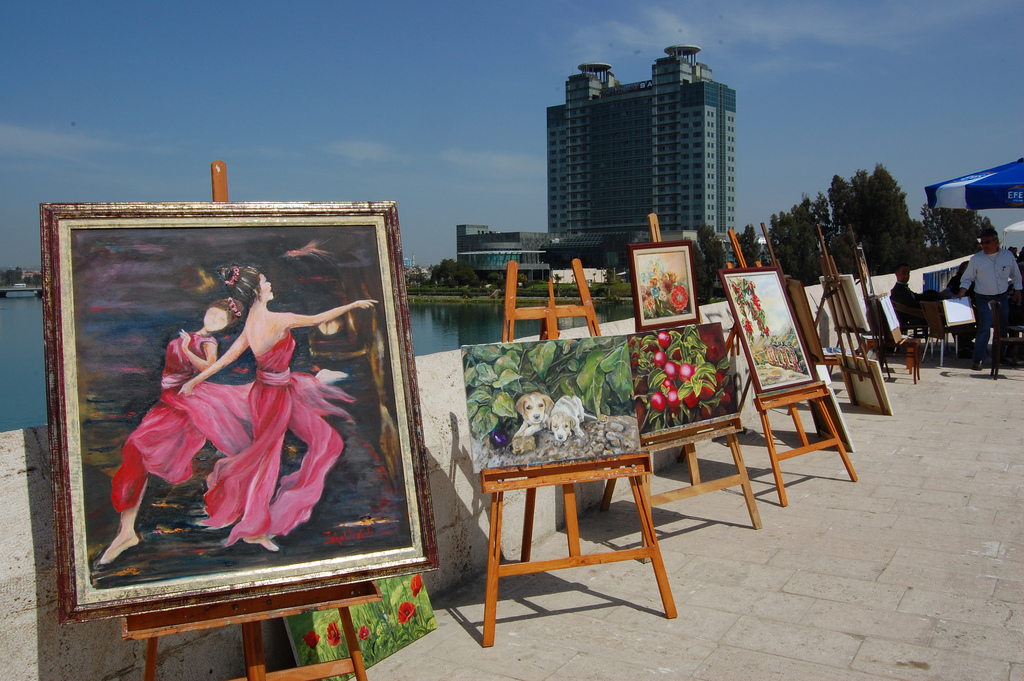
An art exhibition on Taşköprü during the Sabancı Theatre Festival

The cobblestone pavement—the subject of many folk songs—was built by Adana Governor Süleyman Bahri Paşa (1899–1908). A pavilion supported on four columns was built midway across the bridge by the Governor Mahmut Paşa but was later demolished.

The piers supporting the arches have become quite worn over time. They show several interesting architectural techniques. The bossage technique is visible on the downstream side of the eastern piers. The upstream faces of the piers show stepped cutwaters and footings. These stepped piers are a feature typical of Roman construction. Two of the relieving arches (the fifth and seventh arches from the western end) have their upstream side open but have been filled on the downstream side. The dimensions of the arches all differ due to the complex history of its construction. The upstream faces of the piers now have triangular cutwaters. These were all rebuilt during one of the Ottoman restorations, which accounts for their uniform appearance today.

== Present day ==
In 2007 the bridge was closed to motorized vehicles. Since then, it has become a site for social and cultural events. Surveys in 1996 and 2008 identified the bridge as the location most commonly associated with Adana by its residents. The researchers conjecture that this is more due to its function as a landmark than to widespread knowledge of its history. They propose using the bridge as "a starting point for reclamation of the city's identity".

== See also ==
- List of Roman bridges
- Roman architecture
- Roman engineering

== Sources ==
- "Adana Köprüsü taştan..." [Stone-built Adana Bridge...] (in Turkish). Adanadan.biz.
- Gratien, Chris (August 2014). "Migrant Workers in Ottoman Anatolia" (Podcast).
- Langlois, Victor (1861), Voyage dans la Cilicie et dans les montagnes du Taurus [Travels in Cilicia and the Taurus Mountains] (in French), Duprat
- O’Connor, Colin (1993), Roman Bridges, Cambridge University Press, p. 127 (E28), ISBN 0-521-39326-4
- Saban Ökesli, Duygu; Gürçınar, Yusuf (2012). "An Investigation of Urban Image and Identity: Findings from Adana". Çukurova Üniversitesi Sosyal Bilimler Enstitüsü Dergisi. 21 (1): 37–52.
- Procopius (1940), "Chapter 5: Buildings in Asia", De Aedificiis [Buildings of Justinian, Book V], Loeb Classical Library edition of Procopius (Volume VII) (in Latin), translated by Henry Bronson Dewing, Loeb, p. 339
