= Augusta (Cilicia) =

Town in the interior of ancient Cilicia

Coordinates: 37°14′43″N 35°20′39″E

Augusta (Ancient Greek: Αὔγουστα or Αὐγοῦστα) was a town in the interior of ancient Cilicia, inhabited during Roman and Byzantine times. It was founded in 20 AD and named after Livia, the widow of the Emperor Augustus. Ptolemy places this town in a district named Bryelice. The town also bore the name Augustopolis, and possibly Thebae.

The city probably lost its position as an important center after the Muslim invasion of Cilicia in the 7th century.

Its site is located near Gübe in Asiatic Turkey.

In 431 Tarianus, Bishop of Augusta represented the town at the Council of Ephesus.

The ancient city was flooded due to the Seyhan Dam in 1955. Before it disappeared under the waters of the dam the researchers managed to partially survey the site and record some buildings of the city. Among these were the foundations of a triumphal arch, two colonnaded streets crossing each other, a theater, a civic basilica, some shops, a bath building and a dam on the river.
