= List of hydroelectric power stations in Turkey =

The following is a list of hydroelectric power stations in Turkey with a nameplate capacity of 100 MW or more.

There are about 60 power plants of 100 MW and over operating as hydroelectricity in Turkey. Total installed capacity is 32 GW. A few plants are under construction.

== Hydroelectric power stations ==
Name	River (basin)	Capacity (MW)	Notes
Akköprü	Dalaman	115	
Alkumru	Botan	265	
Altınkaya	Kızılırmak	700	
Artvin	Çoruh	340	
Aslantaş	Ceyhan	138	
Atatürk	Euphrat	2400	
Batman	Batman	198	
Berke	Ceyhan	510	
Borçka	Çoruh	300	
Boyabat	Kızılırmak	513	
Birecik	Euphrat	672	
Çatalan	Seyhan	169	
Çınarcık	Orhaneli	100	
Deriner	Çoruh	670	
Dicle	Tigris	110	
Ermenek	Ermenek	300	
Gezende	Ermenek	159	
Gökçekaya	Sakarya	278	
Hasan-Uğurlu	Yeşilırmak	500	
Hirfanlı	Kızılırmak	128	
Ilısu	Tigris	1200	
Karakaya	Euphrat	1800	
Karıca	Melet	112	
Karkamış	Euphrat	189	
Keban	Euphrat	1330	
Kığı	Peri	180	
Kılıçkaya	Kelkit	124	
Köprü	Göksu	148	
Menzelet	Ceyhan	248	
Muratlı	Çoruh	115	
Obruk	Kızılırmak	202	
Oymapınar	Manavgat	540	
Özlüce	Peri	200	
Sarıyar	Sakarya	160	
Silvan	Kulp	160	Under Construction
Sır	Ceyhan	284	
Torul	Harşit	105	
Yamula	Kızılırmak	104	
Yedigöze	Seyhan	320	
Yusufeli	Çoruh	540	

== See also ==
- List of power stations in Turkey
