= Uğurlu =

Uğurlu may refer to:

== People ==
- Berk Uğurlu (born 1996), Turkish basketball player
- Enes Uğurlu (born 1989), archer from Turkey
- Mehmet Erdem Uğurlu (born 1988), Turkish footballer
- Mustafa Uğurlu (born 1955), Turkish actor
- Mustafa Zeki Uğurlu, admiral in the Turkish Navy
- Sami Uğurlu (born 1978), Turkish football manager and former player

== Places ==
- Uğurlu, Akçakoca, a village in Düzce Province in Turkey.
- Uğurlu, Alanya, a neighbourhood in Antalya Province, Turkey
- Uğurlu, Bismil, a neighbourhood in Diyarbakır Province in Turkey
- Uğurlu, Bucak, a village in Burdur Province in Turkey
- Uğurlu, Gökçeada, a village in Çanakkale Province in Turkey
- Uğurlu, Kızılcahamam, a neighbourhood in Kızılcahamam, Ankara Province, Turkey
- Uğurlu, Kurucaşile, a village in Bartın Province, Turkey
- Uğurlu, Şenkaya, in Erzurum Province, Turkey
- Uğurlu, Sincik, a village in Adıyaman Province, Turkey
- Hasan Uğurlu Dam, on the River Yeşilırmak 23 km south of Çarşamba town
- Suat Uğurlu Dam, 24 km downstream of Hasan Uğurlu Dam on the River Yeşilırmak 13 km south of Çarşamba town
