= Sırımtaş Dam =

- Location within Turkey
- Official name: Sırımtaş Baraji
- Location: Alancık, Adıyaman Province, Turkey
- Coordinates: 38°01′48.3″N 38°33′23.3″E
- Purpose: Power
- Status: Operational
- Construction began: 2009
- Opening date: 2013

Dam and spillways
- Type of dam: Gravity, roller-compacted concrete
- Impounds: Birimşe River
- Height: 92 m (302 ft)

Reservoir
- Creates: Sırımtaş Reservoir

Sırımtaş HES
- Coordinates: 37°59′50.3″N 38°32′43.1″E
- Operators: Tektuğ Electric Manufacturing Co., Ltd
- Installed capacity: 28 MW
- Annual generation: 87 GWh

The Sırımtaş Dam is a gravity dam and one of the 22 dams of the Southeastern Anatolia Project. It is located on the Birimşe River near the town of Alancık in Adıyaman Province, Turkey. Construction on the 92 m (302 ft) tall dam began in 2009 and was completed in May 2013. The primary purpose of the dam is hydroelectric power production and its power station has a 28 MW installed capacity.
