= Cizre Dam =

- Location within Turkey
- Official name: Cizre Baraji
- Location: Cizre, Şırnak Province, Turkey
- Coordinates: 37°21′47″N 42°09′17″E
- Purpose: Power, irrigation
- Status: Under construction
- Owner: State Hydraulic Works

Dam and spillways
- Type of dam: Embankment, earth-fill
- Impounds: Tigris River
- Height: 46 m (151 ft)
- Length: 740 m (2,428 ft)
- Elevation at crest: 409 m (1,342 ft)
- Width (crest): 15 m (49 ft)
- Width (base): 190 m (623 ft)
- Dam volume: 3,300,000 m^{3} (2,675 acre⋅ft)
- Spillway type: Service overflow, controlled-chute
- Spillway capacity: 18,700 m^{3}/s (660,384 cu ft/s)

Reservoir
- Creates: Cizre Reservoir
- Total capacity: 360,000,000 m^{3} (290,000 acre⋅ft)
- Active capacity: 208,000,000 m^{3} (169,000 acre⋅ft)
- Inactive capacity: 152,000,000 m^{3} (123,000 acre⋅ft)
- Catchment area: 38,295 km^{2} (14,786 sq mi)
- Surface area: 21 km^{2} (8.1 mi^{2})
- Maximum length: 40 km (25 mi)
- Normal elevation: 404.4 m (1,327 ft)

Power Station
- Hydraulic head: 36 m (118 ft) (gross)
- Turbines: 3 x 80 MW Francis-type
- Installed capacity: 240 MW
- Website

The Cizre Dam is a dam being constructed on the Tigris River north of Cizre, Turkey. The Cizre Dam is to be built in conjunction and downstream of the Ilisu Dam. The Cizre Dam is also one of the planned dams of Turkey's Southeastern Anatolia Project (GAP). The purpose of the Cizre Dam is irrigation, hydro-power and to control the tailwaters of the Ilisu Dam.

A tender for the Cizre Dam was unsuccessfully issued in May 2008 but another issue on 15 May 2014 left Zorlu Energy as the winning bidder. The Cizre Dam will have a hydro-power capacity of 240 MW and will provide irrigation for 121,000 hectares. It was approved by the government in 2023 and is planned to be completed by 2027.

A 2023 study predicted that this and other dams would have considerable sociological impact downstream in Iraq.

Cizre Dam construction started as of September 2024
