= Silvan Dam =

- Location within Turkey
- Official name: Silvan Barajı
- Location: Silvan, Turkey
- Coordinates: 38°17′38″N 41°01′18″E
- Purpose: Irrigation, power
- Status: Under construction
- Construction began: 2011
- Owner: State Hydraulic Works

Dam and spillways
- Type of dam: Embankment, concrete-face rock-fill
- Impounds: Batman River
- Height: 174.5 m (573 ft)
- Length: 440 m (1,444 ft)
- Dam volume: 8,500,000 m^{3} (6,891 acre⋅ft)

Reservoir
- Creates: Silvan Reservoir
- Total capacity: 7,300,000,000 m^{3} (5,900,000 acre⋅ft)
- Surface area: 178 square kilometres (69 mi^{2})

Power Station
- Commission date: 2022
- Turbines: 4 x 40 MW Francis-type
- Installed capacity: 160 MW

Silvan Dam is an embankment concrete-face rock-fill currently under construction on the Batman River in the district of Silvan, Diyarbakır Province in southeastern Turkey. It is part of the Southeastern Anatolia Project and located upstream of the Batman Dam. Construction began on 26 July 2011. The purpose of the dam is hydroelectric power production and irrigation. It is designed to irrigate an area of 245,000 ha (610,000 acres). The power station will have an installed capacity of 160 MW.

In 2014, the dam, as well as other in southeast Turkey such as the Ilisu Dam, became a prime target of Kurdistan Workers' Party (PKK) militants after peace talks collapsed with the government. Attacks on the dam, supporting structures and workers are part of the PKK's efforts to stop construction. These attacks delayed construction by 2 years.

The construction of the Silvan Tunnel which brings the water from the dam to the surrounding plains started in June 2019. The dam body was completed in January 2021 and some sources say the entire project was completed in the end of 2022. As of 2024 other sources say it is still under construction.
