= Taşkale =

Taşkale may refer to the following places in Turkey:

- Taşkale, Karaman, a village and caves complex in Karaman District, Karaman Province
- Taşkale, Sincik, a village and caves complex in Sincik District, Adıyaman Province
