= Dicle Dam =

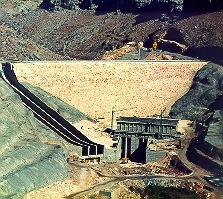

- Location within Turkey
- Interactive map of Dicle Dam
- Official name: Dicle Baraji
- Location: Diyarbakır, Turkey
- Coordinates: 38°13′51.02″N 40°10′35.59″E
- Purpose: Power, irrigation
- Status: Operational
- Construction began: 1986
- Opening date: 1997
- Owner: State Hydraulic Works

Dam and spillways
- Type of dam: Embankment, earth-fill
- Impounds: Tigris River
- Height: 75 m (246 ft)
- Length: 307 m (1,007 ft)
- Elevation at crest: 718 m (2,356 ft)
- Width (crest): 10 m (33 ft)
- Width (base): 328 m (1,076 ft)
- Dam volume: 3,100,000 m^{3} (2,513 acre⋅ft)
- Spillway type: Service overflow, controlled-chute
- Spillway capacity: 5,000 m^{3}/s (176,573 cu ft/s)

Reservoir
- Creates: Dicle Reservoir
- Total capacity: 595,000,000 m^{3} (482,000 acre⋅ft)
- Active capacity: 255,000,000 m^{3} (207,000 acre⋅ft)
- Inactive capacity: 340,000,000 m^{3} (280,000 acre⋅ft)
- Catchment area: 3,216 km^{2} (1,242 sq mi)
- Surface area: 24 km^{2} (9.3 mi^{2})
- Maximum length: 20 km (12 mi)
- Normal elevation: 710 m (2,330 ft)

Power Station
- Hydraulic head: 67 m (220 ft) (gross)
- Turbines: 3 x 55 MW Francis-type
- Installed capacity: 110 MW
- Annual generation: 298 GWh

Dicle Dam (Turkish: Dicle Barajı, lit. 'Tigris Dam') is one of the 21 dams of the Southeastern Anatolia Project of Turkey. These facilities are located within the provincial territory of Diyarbakır, at a distance of 50 kilometres to Diyarbakır city centre. More specifically, the dam and the hydroelectric power plant are located in Eğil district, at a distance of 800 metres from the point of junction of the streams of Maden Stream and Dibni to form the Tigris, and 22 kilometres downstream of the Kralkızı Dam. Construction works were started in 1986 and the dam was completed in 1997. The dam has an installed hydroelectric capacity of 110 MW and is designed to ultimately irrigate 128,080 hectares. In 2001 a water transmission line and a water treatment plant were commissioned that provided about 85% of the drinking water for the city of Diyarbakir in 2010. In 2018, a gate of the dam broke, and the subsequent decrease of the water level caused a part of a village in Eğil district to re-emerge.
