= Ondokuzmayıs Dam =

Coordinates: 41.4591°N 36.0297°E

- Interactive map of Ondokuzmayıs Dam
- Location: Turkey

Ondokuzmayıs Dam is a dam in Samsun Province, Turkey, which began construction in 2014. The development was backed by the Turkish State Hydraulic Works.

== See also ==
- List of dams and reservoirs in Turkey
