= Serince, Sincik =

Village in Adıyaman Province, Turkey

Serince
- Village
- Location within Turkey
- Coordinates: 38.054°N 38.606°E
- Country: Turkey
- Province: Adıyaman
- District: Sincik
- Population (2021): 255
- Time zone: UTC+3 (TRT)

Serince (Kurdish: Dud) is a village in the Sincik District, Adıyaman Province, Turkey. The village is populated by Kurds of the Reşwan tribe and had a population of 255 in 2021.

The hamlets of Dut, Gülüsor, Soğanlı and Yassıkaya are attached to Serince.
