= Sincik District =

- District
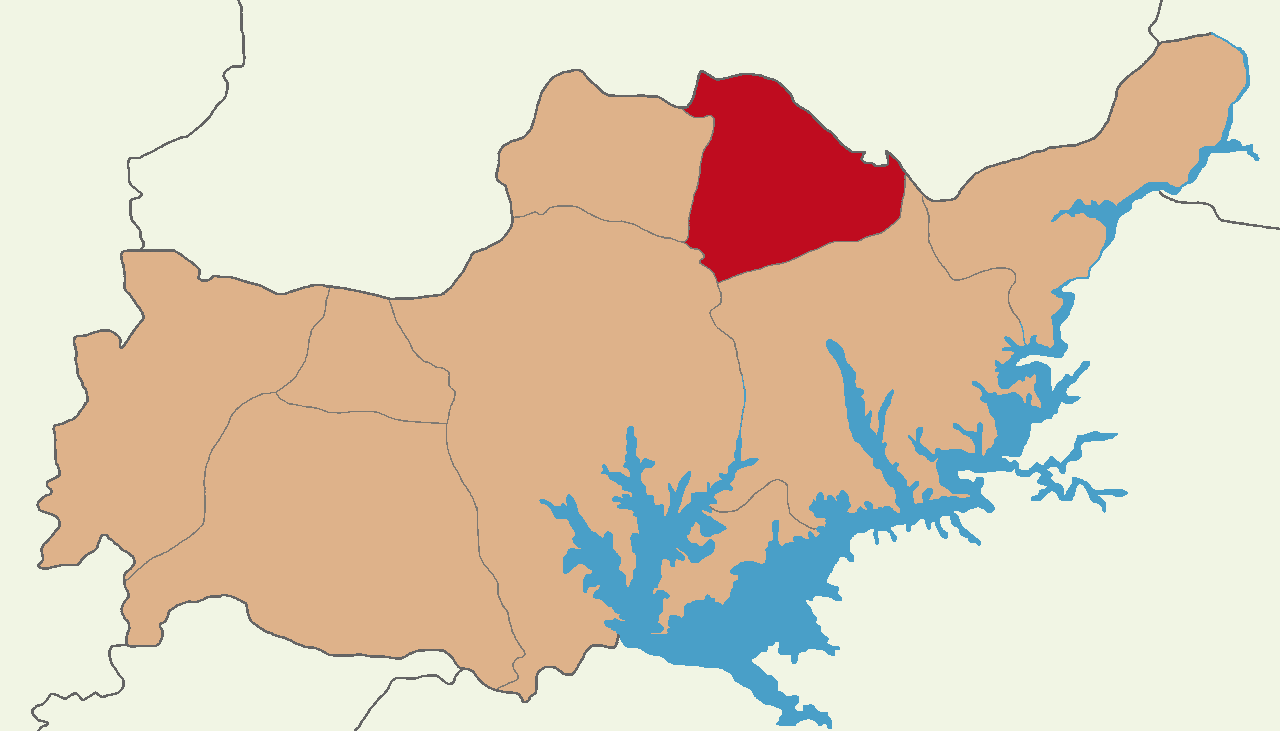
- Map showing Sincik District in Adıyaman Province

- Location within Turkey
- Coordinates: 38°02′N 38°37′E
- Country: Turkey
- Province: Adıyaman
- Seat: Sincik

Government
  - Kaymakam: İbrahim Özkan
- Area: 495 km^{2} (191 sq mi)
- Population (2021): 16,341
  - Density: 33.0/km^{2} (85.5/sq mi)
- Time zone: UTC+3 (TRT)

Sincik District is a district of Adıyaman Province of Turkey. Its seat is the town Sincik. Its area is 495 km^{2}, and its population is 16,341 (2021).

The district was established in 1990.

== Composition ==
There are two municipalities in Sincik District:

- İnlice (Geler)
- Sincik (Sinciq)

There are 24 villages in Sincik District:

- Aksu (Avêspî)
- Alancık (Lagîn)
- Arıkonak (Qomîk)
- Balkaya (Hecik)
- Çamdere (Palikan)
- Çat
- Çatbahçe (Çavcûk)
- Dilektepe(Kalikan)
- Eskiköy
- Geçitli (Zevîkerê)
- Hasanlı (Hesencûbûr)
- Hüseyinli (Hopan)
- Karaköse (Qereqose)
- Narlı (Pamlî)
- Pınarbaşı (Kiran)
- Sakız (Seqiz)
- Serince (Dud)
- Söğütlübahçe (Sogûtbahçe)
- Subaşı (Serav)
- Şahinbeyler
- Şahkolu (Şahkullî)
- Taşkale (Tixinkar)
- Uğurlu
- Yarpuzlu (Bîrîmşe)

== Demography ==
The town and its villages are populated by Kurds from the Reşwan tribe.
