= Geçitli, Sincik =

Village in Adıyaman Province, Turkey

Geçitli
- Village
- Location within Turkey
- Coordinates: 38.130°N 38.529°E
- Country: Turkey
- Province: Adıyaman
- District: Sincik
- Population (2021): 94
- Time zone: UTC+3 (TRT)

Geçitli (Kurdish: Zevîkerê) is a village in the Sincik District, Adıyaman Province, Turkey. The village is populated by Kurds of the Reşwan tribe and had a population of 94 in 2021.
