= Şahinbeyler, Sincik =

Şahinbeyler
- Village
- Location within Turkey
- Coordinates: 38.051°N 38.434°E
- Country: Turkey
- Province: Adıyaman
- District: Sincik
- Population (2021): 261
- Time zone: UTC+3 (TRT)

Şahinbeyler (Kurdish: Şahînbeg) is a village in the Sincik District, Adıyaman Province, Turkey. It is populated by Kurds of the Reşwan tribe and had a population of 261 in 2021.
