= Karaköse, Sincik =

Village in Adıyaman Province, Turkey

Karaköse
- Village
- Location within Turkey
- Coordinates: 38.067°N 38.487°E
- Country: Turkey
- Province: Adıyaman
- District: Sincik
- Population (2021): 193
- Time zone: UTC+3 (TRT)

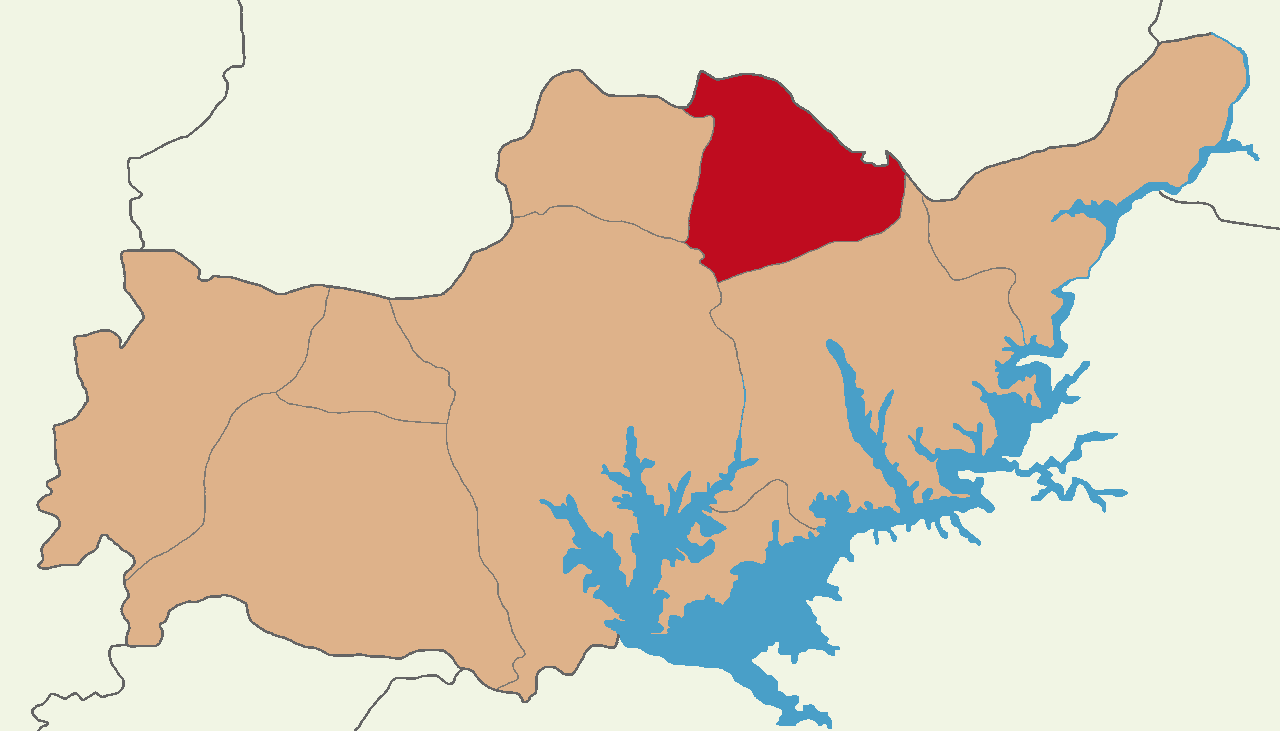

Karaköse (Kurdish: Qerekose) is a village in the Sincik District, Adıyaman Province, Turkey. The village is populated by Kurds of the Reşwan tribe and had a population of 193 in 2021.

The hamlet of Kargı is attached to Karaköse.
