= Çat, Sincik =

Village in Adıyaman Province, Turkey

Çat
- Village
- Location within Turkey
- Coordinates: 38.0438°N 38.6938°E
- Country: Turkey
- Province: Adıyaman
- District: Sincik
- Population (2021): 336
- Time zone: UTC+3 (TRT)

Çat is a village in the Sincik District, Adıyaman Province, Turkey. The village is populated by Kurds of the Reşwan tribe and had a population of 336 in 2021.

The hamlet of Kilimli is attached to the village.
