= Çamgazi Dam =

Coordinates: 37.6819°N 38.1371°E

- Location: Adıyaman, Turkey
- Purpose: Irrigation and industrial water dam
- Status: Operational
- Construction began: 1990
- Opening date: 1999

Dam and spillways
- Type of dam: Earth fill dam
- Height (foundation): 45 meters
- Dam volume: 5,512,000 m³

Reservoir
- Total capacity: 56,000,000 m³
- Surface area: 6 km²

Çamgazi Dam is a dam in Adıyaman, Turkey. The development was backed by the Turkish State Hydraulic Works. Construction began in 1990, and finished in 1999. The dam is still in use.

== See also ==
- List of dams and reservoirs in Turkey
