= Southeastern Anatolia Project =

Project led by the Government of Türkiye

The Southeastern Anatolia Project (Turkish: Güneydoğu Anadolu Projesi, GAP) is a multi-sector integrated regional development project based on the concept of sustainable development for the 9.5 million people (2025) living in the Southeastern Anatolia region of Turkey. According to the Southeastern Anatolia Project Regional Development Administration, the aim of the GAP is to eliminate regional development disparities by raising incomes and living standards and to contribute to the national development targets of social stability and economic growth by enhancing the productive and employment generating capacity of the rural sector. The Southeastern Anatolia Region extending over wide plains in the Euphrates-Tigris Basin encompass the administrative provinces of ( Adıyaman, Batman, Diyarbakır, Gaziantep, Kilis, Siirt, Şanlıurfa, Şırnak and Mardin ) which are located in the basins of the Euphrates and Tigris and in Upper Mesopotamia. The surface area of the region bordering with Syria to the south and with Iraq to the south-east is 75,193 square kilometres which corresponds to 9.7% of Turkey's total surface area. Turkey has in total 8.5 million hectares of irrigable land and GAP's share in this total is 20 per cent. The total cost of the project is over 190 billion Turkish lira (TL) (2020 adjusted price).

Current activities under GAP include sectors like agriculture and irrigation, hydroelectric power production, urban and rural infrastructure, forestry, education and health. Water resources development envisaged the construction of 22 dams and 19 power plants.

== History ==
Logo of GAP

The initial idea and decision to utilize the waters of the Euphrates and Tigris rivers came from Atatürk, the founder of the Republic. During the one party era, the need for electrical energy was a priority issue. The Electricity Studies Administration was founded in 1936 to investigate how rivers in the country could be utilized for energy production. The Administration began its detailed studies with the "Keban Dam Project" and established observation stations to assess the flow and other characteristics of the Euphrates. The GAP as it is structured today, was planned in the 1970s consisting of projects for irrigation and hydraulic energy production on the Euphrates and Tigris, but transformed into a multi-sector social and economic development program for the region in the early 80s. The development program encompassed such sectors as irrigation, hydraulic energy, agriculture, rural and urban infrastructure, forestry, education and health. With the development of new GAP Administrative structure in 1988–1989, its basic objectives included the improvement of living standards and income levels of people so as to eliminate regional development disparities (economic inequality) and contributing to national goals such as social stability and economic growth by enhancing productivity and employment opportunities in the rural sector.

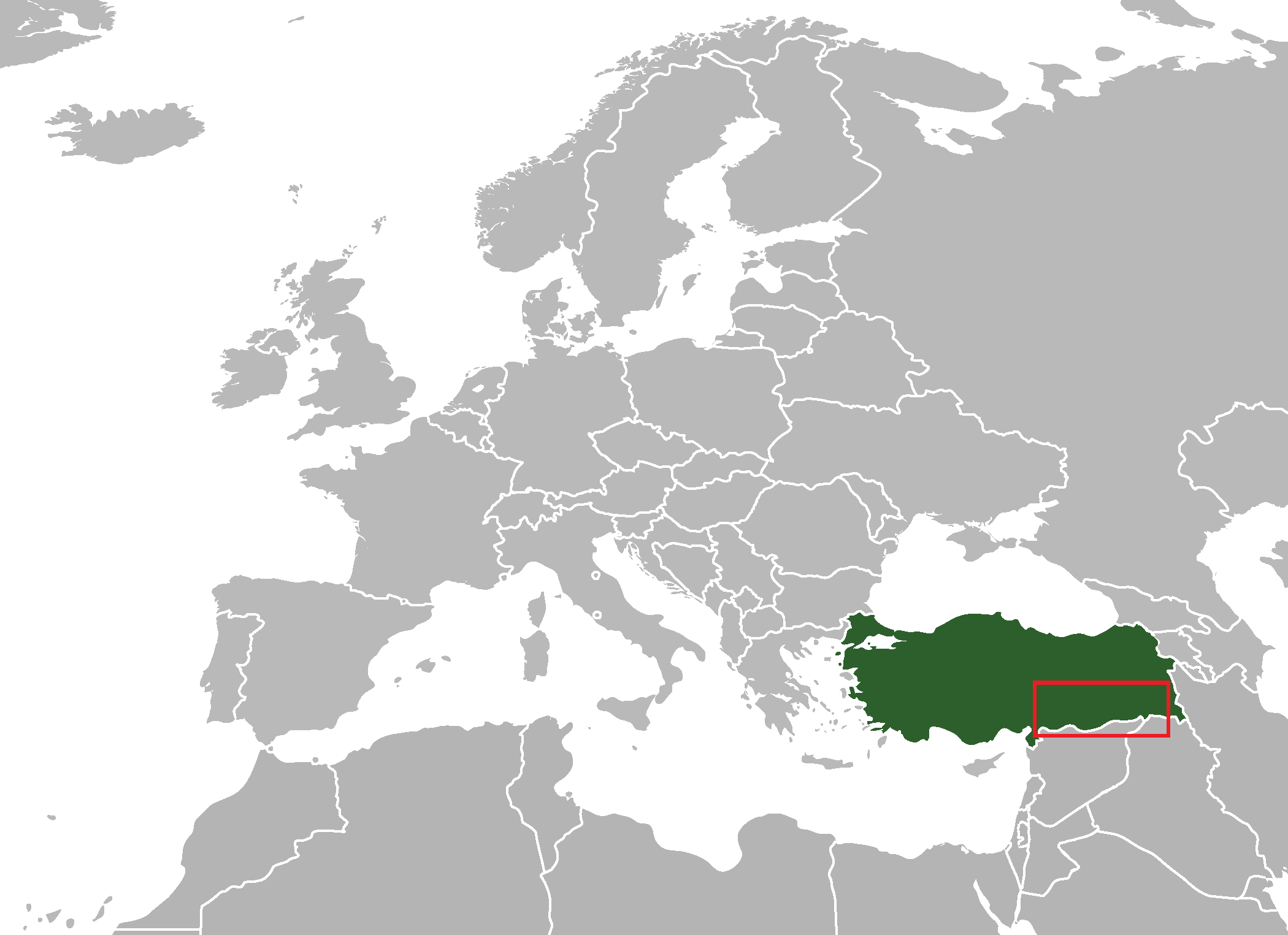
Location of GAP

Tensions between Turkey, Syria and Iraq have risen from time to time due to GAP. Syria and Iraq have demanded that more water be released, while Turkey has declined so as to form the dam reservoirs. Because of this GAP is one of the world's most well protected dam projects, especially against aerial attacks. GAP also almost came to a complete halt in the early 1990s due to the high level of Kurdish (PKK) activities in the region. The PKK is not only blamed for a number of funding cuts, as funds were diverted to support the counter-terrorism effort, but also for damaging several dams and canals, as well as killing engineers working at the dams. A number of economic crises also played a very important part in delaying the completion of GAP.

The UN embargo on Iraq (which was lifted after the Second Gulf War) had negative effects on development efforts and the region's trade with Middle Eastern countries, which are its natural economic partners. Furthermore, imbalances in public financing delayed the financing needs of the project. Finally, a number of judicial questions needed clearing over the flooding of several historical sites as well as local residences, which are described in the "social effect" section.

== Strategic goal ==
Historically, Southeastern Anatolia was located on the trading route between East and West. The region had been an important source of cultural diversity. However the changes in the trading routes and the agricultural methods ended the old importance of the region.

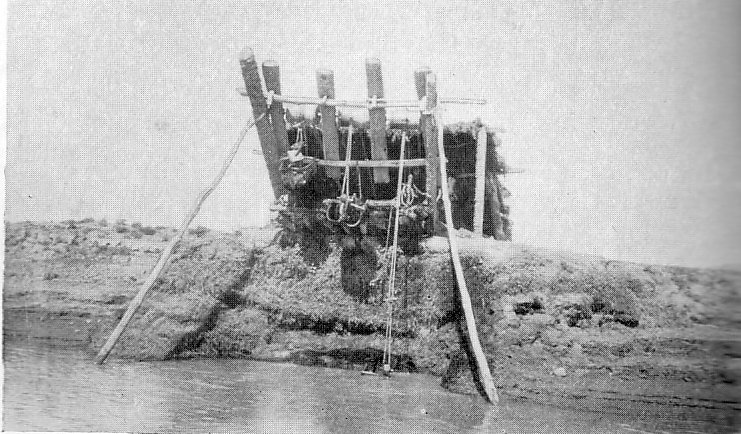
Irrigation in Harran

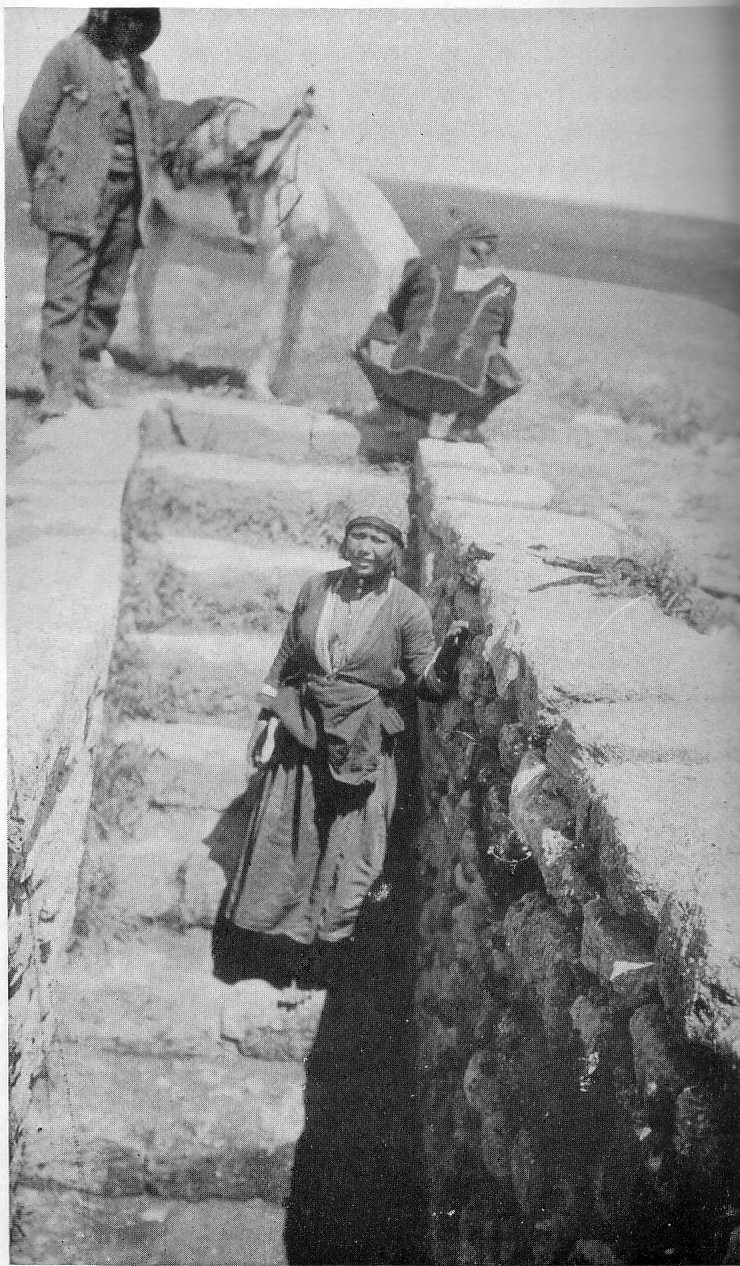
Well and a girl

The 1989 Master Plan had aimed to initiate the revitalization of the economic, social and cultural life in the region through an "integrated regional development project". The rise in the income of the region was directly transferred to restoration and revitalization of the cultural activities in the region, instead of moving into the national budget. This master plan did not reach its goals because of the issues stated under the introduction section. However, for this negative perspective, with the international community involvement, project added new dimensions and concepts to the definitions.

The concerns and concepts of the environment, sustainability and participation, which were either overlooked or totally absent in the original plan has been added with the UNDP support. The revised "GAP Regional Development Plan" with a new understanding is currently in place. The macro frame of the GAP Regional Development Plan (GAP-RDP) is drawn by 8th Five-Year Development Plan coordinated with the efforts under the "Program for Transition to a Strengthened Economy" prepared as a part of the process for Turkey's accession to the European Union.

== Social effect ==
The project rests upon the philosophy of sustainable human development, which aims to create an environment in which future generations can benefit and develop. The basic strategies of the project include fairness in development, participation, environmental protection, jobs creation, spatial planning and infrastructure development. In reaching these goals the primary objective of GAP is to normalize levels of development, income, and living standards between the southeastern region and other regions of Turkey. GAP is transforming the region completely by creating economic and social opportunities and promoting business. Critical infrastructure, such as airports and highways, is being constructed to support the development of the region. GAP will provide jobs to an estimated 3.5 million people directly.

== Economic development ==
=== Irrigation ===
GAP is estimated to double Turkey's irrigable farmland. The increase of agricultural activity of GAP in its incomplete state is visible clearly on the USDA graph below. Cotton production increased from 150,000 metric tons to 400,000 metric tons, making the region the top cotton producer. But at the same time other regions declined, which means that Turkey's overall output stayed relatively steady.

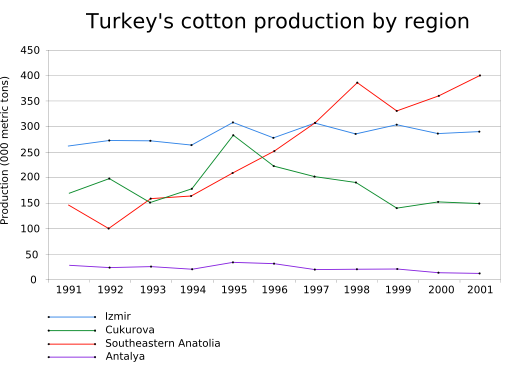
Cotton production

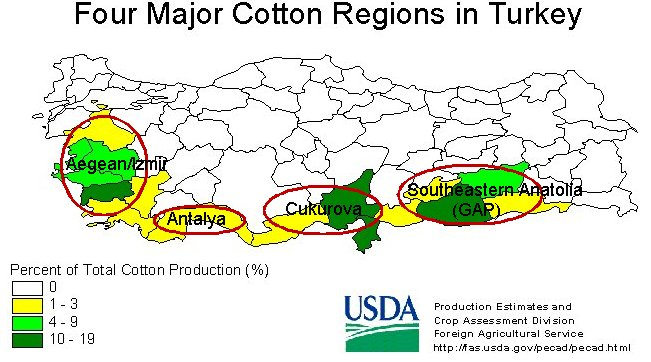
Cotton regions

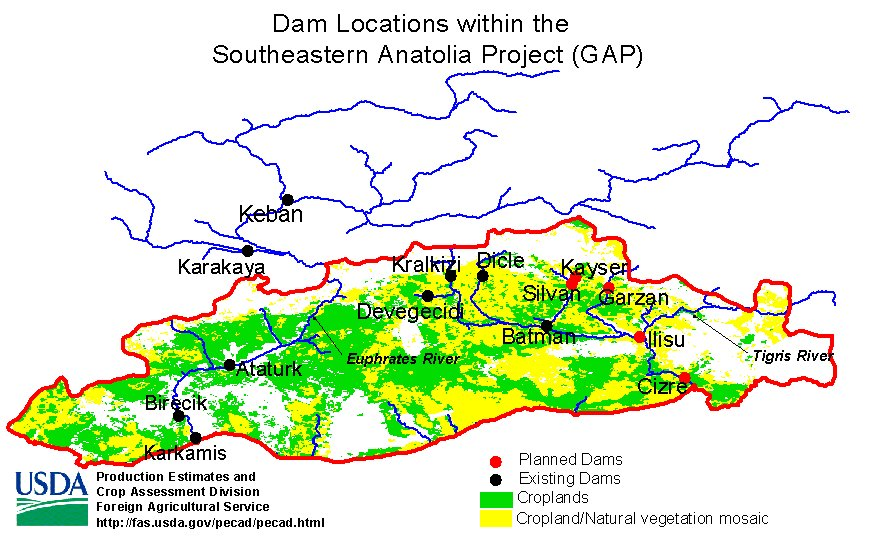
Locations of Dams

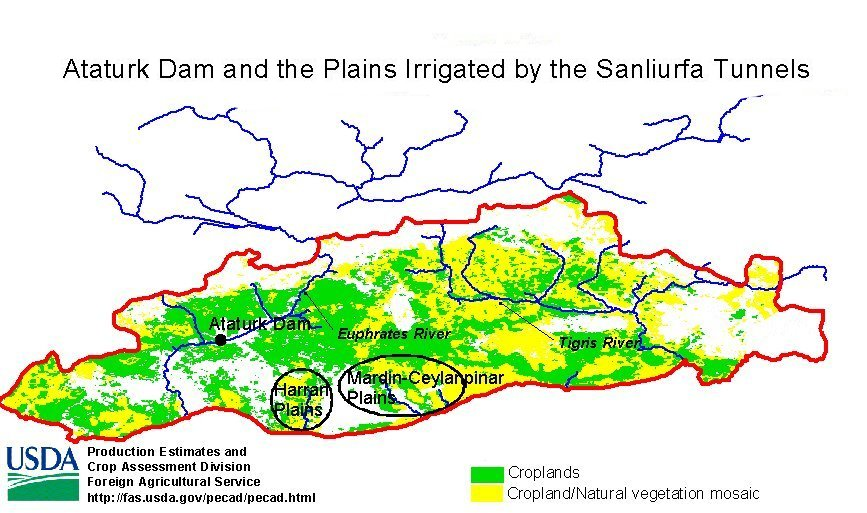
Plains irrigated by the tunnels

GAP is supposed to create 17,000 square kilometres (4.2 million acres) of farmland in the Harran plain alone, as visible on two USDA maps above.

Reports indicate that, due to irrigation from the Atatürk Dam, harvest yields of cotton, wheat, barley, lentils, and other grains in the Harran plain have tripled. A number of Agriculture Department backed initiatives are encouraging farmers to experiment with new varieties of fruits, vegetables, and nuts that did not exist in the region prior.

=== Imports and exports ===
The amount of foreign trade of the region is continuously rising since 2002. In 2002, total export from the region was 689 million $ and total imports stood at 773 million $. According to TÜİK data, GAP's total exports are In 2023, total reached 13.657 billion $, while imports reached 9.330 billion $. Since 2004 the G.A.P. region is net exporter.

=== Fishing ===
GAP is being built in a region where water used to be a scarcity. With the vast number of lakes being formed, plans to use them as breeding spaces for commercial fishing are also underway. In the case of the Atatürk Dam the fishing industry in the region is already developing.

=== Power ===
The GAP also consists of 19 hydroelectric power plants. These will supply the energy equivalent of 22% of the anticipated total nationwide energy consumption in 2010. Providing 8,900 gigawatt hours (32 PJ), it is one of the largest series of hydroelectric power plants in the world.

Physical Realization of Energy Projects as of March 2026
Name	Inst Capacity (MW)	Energy Prod (GWh/yr)	Status
Karakaya Dam & HEPP	1,800	7,354	In operation since 1987
Atatürk Dam & HEPP	2,400	8,900	In operation since 1993
Karkamış Dam & HEPP	189	652	In operation since 1999
Birecik Dam & HEPP	672	2,516	In operation since 2000
Şanlıurfa HEPP	51	124	In operation since 2006
Erkenek HEPP	13	52	In operation since 2010
Sırımtaş Dam & HEPP	27	80	In operation since 2013
Koçali Dam & HEPP	39	136	Under construction
Büyükçay Dam & HEPP	30	84	Master Plan
Kahta Dam & HEPP	75	71	Master Plan
Fatopaşa HEPP	22	32	Master Plan
Çağçağ HEPP	14	42	In operation since 1968
Bulam HEPP	7	33	In operation since 2010
Euphrates Basin	5,339	20,076	
Dicle Dam & HEPP	110	298	In operation since 1999
Kralkızı Dam & HEPP	94	146	In operation since 1998
Batman Dam & HEPP	198	483	In operation since 2003
Garzan Dam & HEPP	52	158	In operation since 2013
Ilısu Dam & HEPP	1,200	3,833	In operation since 2020
Silvan Dam & HEPP	160	623	Under construction
Cizre Dam & HEPP	240	1,208	Under construction
Kayser Dam & HEPP	90	341	Final Project
Tigris Basin	2,144	7,090	
Total	7,483	27,166	

== Infrastructure ==
=== Dams ===
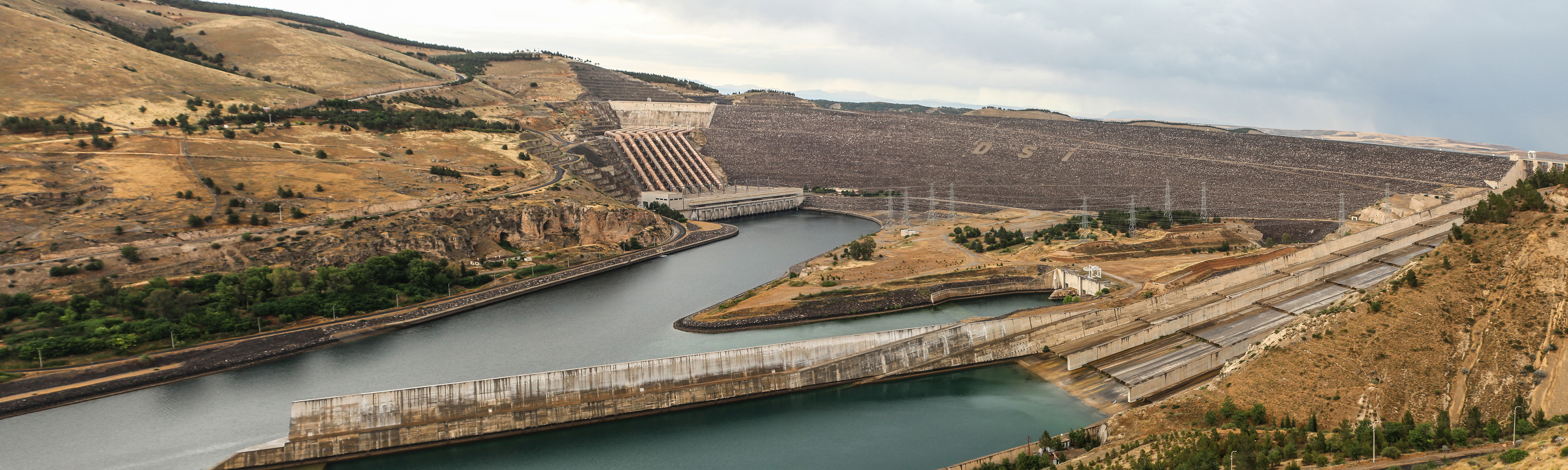
Centerpiece of the project: Atatürk Dam

Southeastern Anatolia Project consists of 22 Dams (year of completion):

Euphrates Basin

1. Atatürk Dam (1992)
2. Birecik Dam (2000)
3. Büyükçay Dam
4. Çamgazi Dam (1998)
5. Çetintepe Dam (2026)
6. Gömükan Dam (2026)
7. Hancağız Dam (1988)
8. Kahta Dam
9. Karakaya Dam (1987)
10. Karkamış Dam (1999)
11. Kayacık Dam (2005)
12. Kemlin Dam
13. Koçali Dam
14. Sırımtaş Dam (2013)

Tigris Basin

1. Batman Dam (1998)
2. Cizre Dam
3. Dicle Dam (1997)
4. Garzan Dam (2012)
5. Kayser Dam
6. Kralkızı Dam (1997)
7. Ilısu Dam (2020)
8. Silvan Dam (2027est.)

=== Maintenance ===
The reason for the sheer number of dams in the project, more than would at first appear needed, is maintenance. Dams need to be cleaned from the debris carried with the water flow. After a while the dam becomes obsolete as water flow slows down to inadequate levels. The dams will be shut down every 5 to 10 years for fall maintenance (also called fall cleanup). Water levels are normally lowest in fall. The extra dams are placed in service during this maintenance period.

In cases of natural disasters such as floods, the maintenance may be performed earlier. The plan is to have one or two dams spare in case an emergency shutdown of any dam is necessary. While shutting down a dam also shuts down irrigation channels linked to it, it can nevertheless continue providing power.

=== Engineering behind the project ===
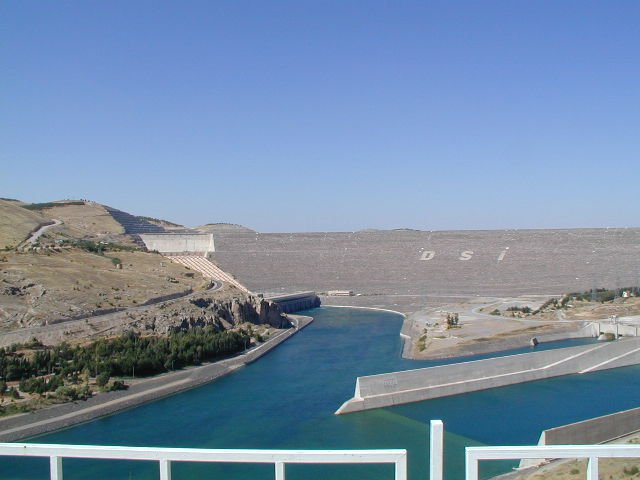
Atatürk Dam

Providing electricity and irrigation is challenging in a region as large as the one targeted by GAP. A constant flow of water is imperative.

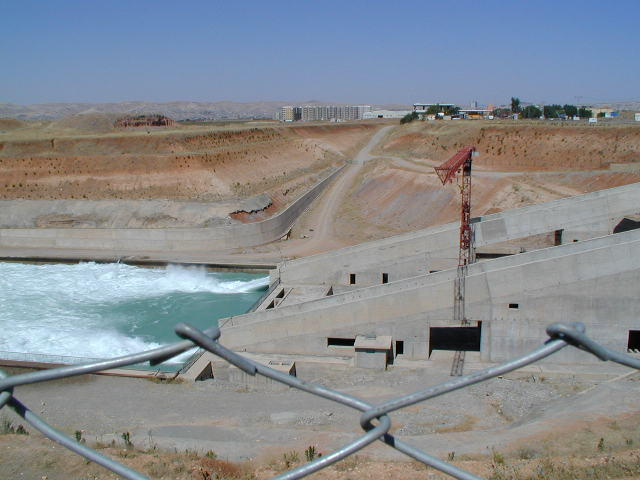
Energy dissipator

After a large body of water is collected behind the dam a constant flow of water is then available. The height of the dam allows the water to go at a high velocity through the turbines thus generating electricity. After the fast flowing water exits the dam it is slowed down by a concrete energy dissipator (pictured). Creation of electricity is only part of the usage of the tons of water collected at the dam.

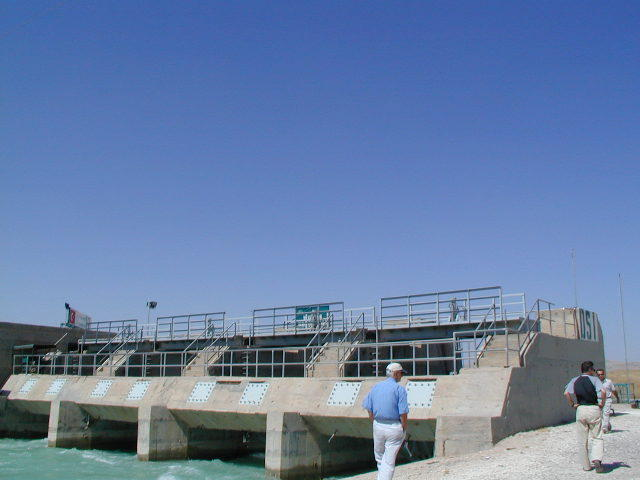
Radial floodgates

When dealing with tons of water, it has to be distributed evenly and slowly. Occasionally main channels will need maintenance, or may be damaged due to external reasons. In order to even assess the problem, tons of water need to be removed from the main channel. The best way to do this is to slow the overall flow from the main dam and redirect all water flowing originally through the damaged channel to backup channels. Radial gates serve this purpose, they regulate the flow of water. It is imperative to keep water flowing. Lack of the flow will not only compromise all irrigation linked to that channel but also all cities linked will experience a power outage.

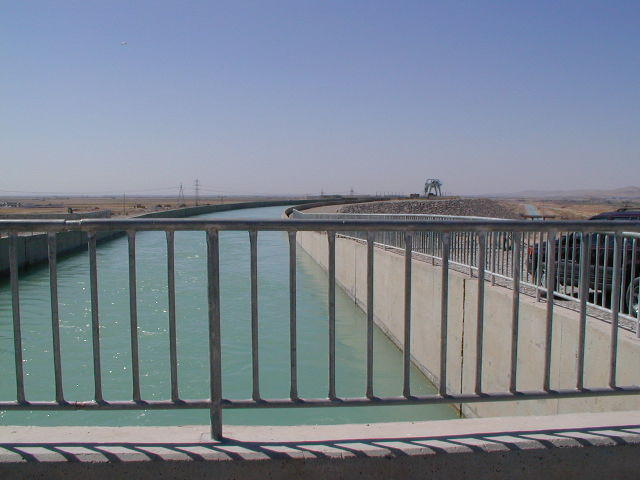
Harran main channel

After leaving the energy dissipator, water flows into a set of main channels, which flow in different directions supplying water to a greater area. They are the most critical part of a dam project aside from the dam itself. This is as critical as high-voltage transmission lines in power grids.

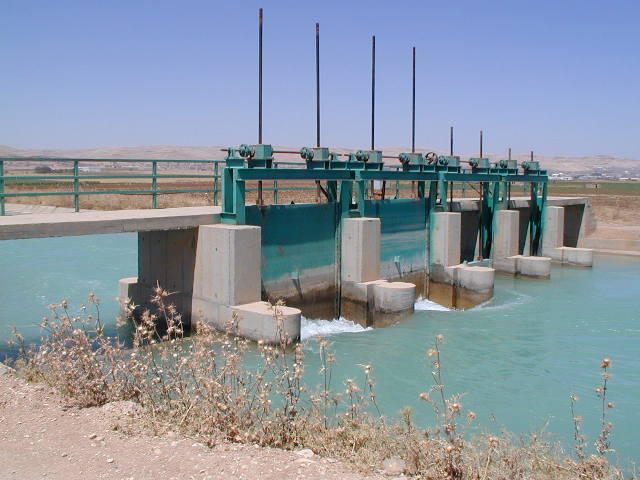
Sluice gates

Sluice gates regulate the flow of water. If water flows too fast it will overflow and probably damage one or more of the channels, or flood irrigation fields. Multiple sluice gates regulate the speed of the flow on different sections of the channel. They can also be used like radial gates to cut water in channels.

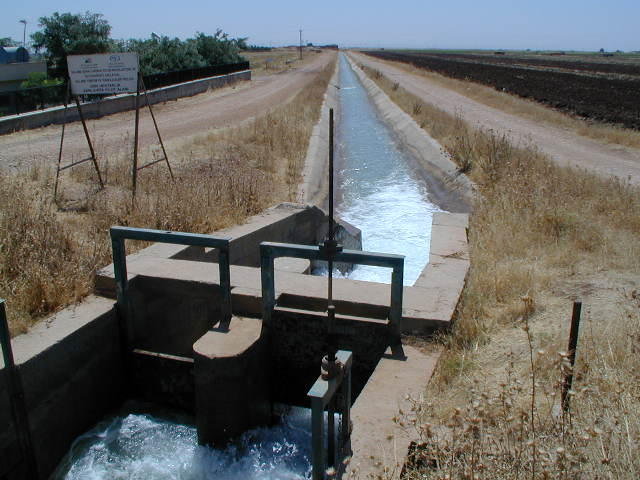
Harran canal

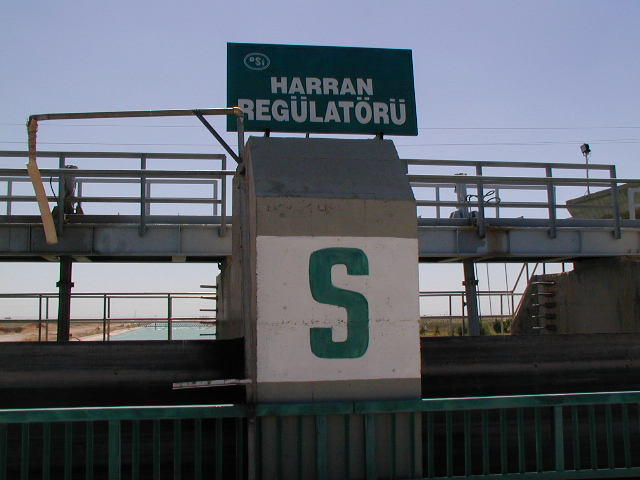
Flow regulator

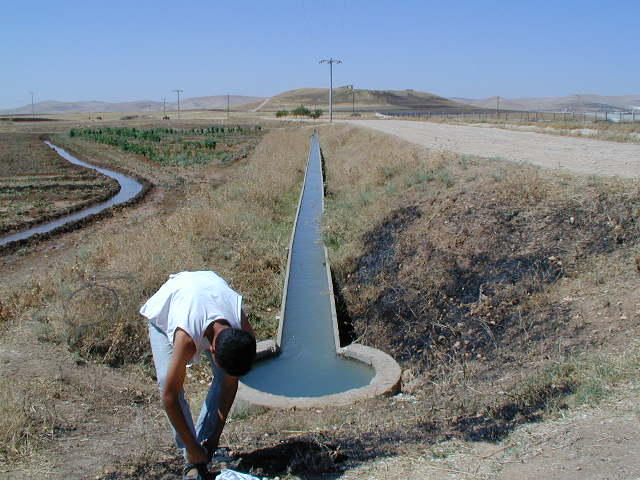
Distribution canals

After leaving the radial gates on the main channel, water flows to canals which are smaller and can carry less water. Flow regulators divert water on canals to distribution canals. Just like radial gates and sluice gates, flow generators can stop water flow if necessary. Distribution canals are the last step as far as engineers are concerned. It delivers water to different sections of large fields, pretty much an artificial river.

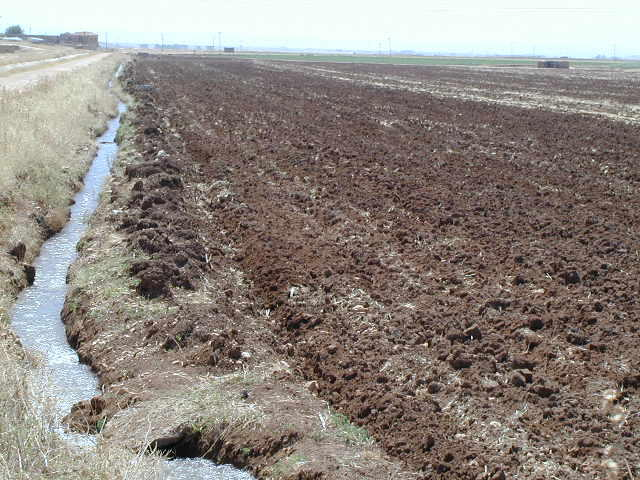
Earth distribution channel

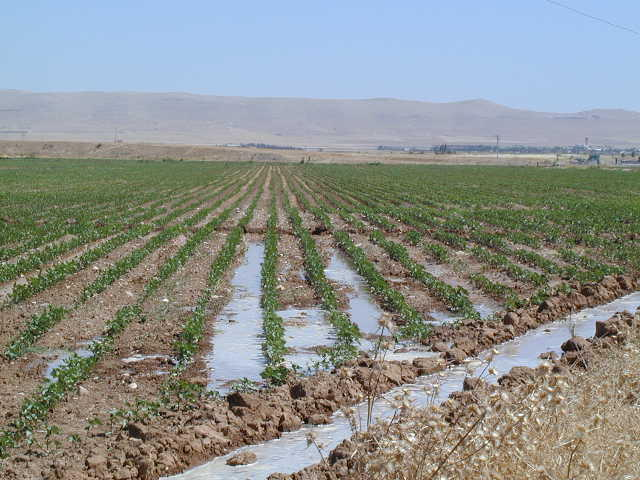
Furrow

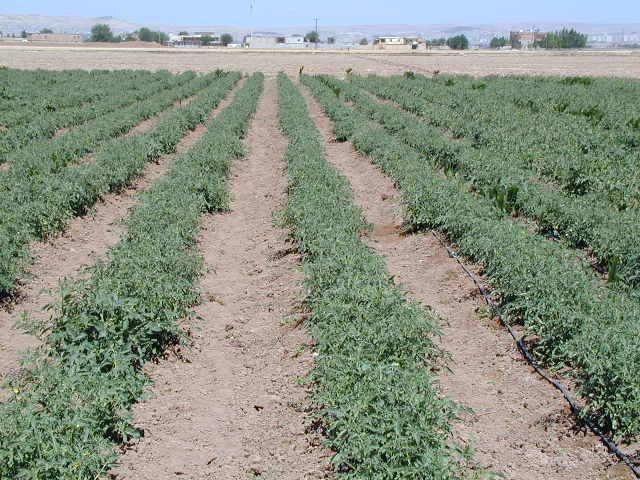
Drip tubes

It is up to farmers to get the water from distribution channels to their crops for irrigation. There are different methods to do this; any one or a combination of earth distribution channel, furrow, and drip tubes can be used.

== Sub-projects ==
The latest design of the project divides the GAP into smaller projects. Each project generates its own annual reports and activity sheets.

- Management, Operation and Maintenance of GAP Irrigation Systems (GAP-MOM),
- Regulation of Water in Irrigation Canals and Methods and Technologies for Water Saving,
- Treatment of Urban Waste Water,
- Re-use of Irrigation Discharge Water,
- Protection of Biological Diversity,
- Environmental Work in the GAP Region,
- Environmental Work in the GAP Region — Tigris Basin,
- Assessment of Climatic Conditions in the Region for Present Day and Future,
- Adıyaman-Kuyulu Region Erosion Control Project,
- Adıyaman-Diran Micro-Catchment Rehabilitation Project,
- GAP Afforestation Project,
- Participation in urban planning and zoning,
- Resettlement and employment of people affected by dam lakes,
- Atatürk Dam Lake Sub-Regional Development Plan,
- Eco-city and eco-village planning and development in pilot localities.
- Establishment of Multi-Purpose Community Centers (ÇATOM) for Women,
- Improving the Income Level of People in Non-Irrigated Areas,
- GAP Entrepreneur Support and Guidance Centers (GAP-GIDEM),
- Project for On-Contract Animal Husbandry (GAP Rings Model),
- Project for Joint Machinery Use (GAP OMAK),
- Sub-Regional Development Plan Comprising Return to Villages and Rehabilitation,
- Project for the Rehabilitation of Children Working in Streets.
- Institutional Capacity Building,
- Training and Extension Services for Farmers,
- Land Consolidation,
- Social Progress for Youth,
- GAP Region Public Health Project.

== Status of GAP ==
The water resources development component of the program envisages the construction of 22 dams and 19 hydraulic power plants and irrigation of 17,000 square kilometres of land. The total cost of the project is estimated at $34 billion USD. The total installed capacity of power plants is 7483 MW and projected annual energy production reaches 27 billion kWh.

Status of the project
	Completed	Ongoing	Planned	Total
Power capacity as of December 2025; MW	6,827	400	256	7,483
Power production as of December 2025; GWh/yr	24,671	1,831	664	27,166
Irrigation area as of December 2025 km^{2}	678,322	90,096	342,937	1,111,355
Number of dams	18	2	2	22
Number of hydropower plants	14	2	3	19

GAP contributes to the country's hydroelectric energy production. As of 2025, 91.2% physical realization of energy investments was achieved.The amount of government investment for 2025 was around 166 billion TL, which corresponds to 11.5% of Turkey's total investment for same year.

== Criticism of the project ==
=== Ilısu Dam ===
Completion of the Ilısu Dam would cause the flooding of the ancient city of Hasankeyf whose history stretches back over 10,000 years. Between 50 and 68 hamlets and villages will be flooded affecting approximately 25,000 local people. An additional 57 villages will have their land partially flooded.

Construction began on August 5, 2006, after a ceremony led by Prime Minister Recep Tayyip Erdoğan. The dam entered into service in 2018.

=== Archeological losses ===
Critics of the project say that the dam could effectively destroy the artifacts of ancient Kurdish, Armenian, and Assyrian habitation in the region.

=== Environmental justice concerns ===
The environmental justice lens of the human-environment geography should determine a fair distribution of environmental benefits and burdens, especially with regard to vulnerable communities. In context of the Ilisu Dam environmental justice focuses attention on the fair treatment of different social groups and the potentially disproportionate impact of these projects on specific communities.

Environmental justice, for example, would highlight how dam construction can disproportionately affect certain communities, perhaps leading to the displacement of indigenous or economically disadvantaged groups as occurred recently in Hasankeyf. It prompts us to ask whether the benefits of hydropower and economic development are distributed fairly to all communities or whether certain groups are hit hardest by the negative impacts, such as loss of land, cultural heritage or livelihoods.

== TRT GAP ==
TRT GAP
- Country: Turkey
- Broadcast area: Turkey
- Affiliates: Radyo GAP
- Headquarters: Ankara

Programming
- Language: Turkish
- Picture format: 576i (4:3 SDTV)
- Timeshift service: TRT 3

Ownership
- Owner: Turkish Radio and Television Corporation

History
- Launched: 2 October 1989; 37 years ago
- Closed: 17 February 2015; 11 years ago

Links
- Website: http://www.trt.net.tr/

TRT GAP, belonging to the Turkish Radio and Television Corporation, was established in 1989 to promote the Southeastern Anatolia Project in the region. In 1991, TRT GAP was put under the jurisdiction of TRT's Ankara facilities. From 1989 to 2001 TRT GAP was broadcasting on TRT 2 before being revamped as a 24-hour news and culturally-oriented channel. TRT GAP's transmissions are realized through the same channel with the TRT 3 since 2001 (which broadcasts live footage of TBMM TV) on a time-share basis.

== See also ==
- Baku-Tbilisi-Ceyhan pipeline
- Ilısu Dam Campaign
- Water politics
