= İnlice, Sincik =

İnlice
- Municipality
- Location in Turkey
- Coordinates: 37.983°N 38.456°E
- Country: Turkey
- Province: Adıyaman
- District: Sincik
- Population (2021): 2,192
- Time zone: UTC+3 (TRT)

İnlice (Kurdish: Geler, Arnût) is a town (belde) and municipality in the Sincik District, Adıyaman Province, Turkey. It is populated by Kurds of the Reşwan tribe and had a population of 2,192 in 2021.
