= Hasanlı, Sincik =

Village in Adıyaman Province, Turkey

Hasanlı
- Village
- Location within Turkey
- Coordinates: 37.974°N 38.521°E
- Country: Turkey
- Province: Adıyaman
- District: Sincik
- Population (2021): 550
- Time zone: UTC+3 (TRT)

Hasanlı (Kurdish: Hesencobar) is a village in the Sincik District, Adıyaman Province, Turkey. The village is populated by Kurds of the Reşwan tribe and had a population of 550 in 2021.

The hamlets of Aksoy, Ayrancı, Çökek, Karadut and Kaymaklı are attached to the village.
