= Söğütlübahçe, Sincik =

Village in Adıyaman Province, Turkey

Söğütlübahçe
- Village
- Location within Turkey
- Coordinates: 37.971°N 38.621°E
- Country: Turkey
- Province: Adıyaman
- District: Sincik
- Population (2021): 350
- Time zone: UTC+3 (TRT)

Söğütlübahçe (Kurdish: Sogûtbahçe, Kunidanim) is a village in the Sincik District, Adıyaman Province, Turkey. The village is populated by Kurds of the Reşwan tribe and had a population of 350 in 2021.

The hamlet of Yassıkaya is attached to the village.
