= Sakız, Sincik =

Village in Adıyaman Province, Turkey

Sakız
- Village
- Location within Turkey
- Coordinates: 38.072°N 38.612°E
- Country: Turkey
- Province: Adıyaman
- District: Sincik
- Population (2021): 301
- Time zone: UTC+3 (TRT)

Sakız (Kurdish: Seqiz) is a village in the Sincik District, Adıyaman Province, Turkey. The village is populated by Kurds of the Reşwan tribe and had a population of 301 in 2021.

The hamlets of Gündoğan, Güvercinler and Ocakbaşı are attached to Sakız.
