= Garzan Dam =

- Location within Turkey
- Interactive map of Garzan Dam
- Official name: Garzan Baraji
- Location: Kozluk, Turkey
- Coordinates: 38°15′06.80″N 41°33′23.31″E
- Purpose: Power, irrigation
- Status: Operational
- Construction began: 2009
- Opening date: 2012

Dam and spillways
- Type of dam: Embankment, rock-fill
- Impounds: Garzan River
- Height: 113 m (371 ft)
- Length: 360 m (1,181 ft)
- Elevation at crest: 779 m (2,556 ft)
- Dam volume: 4,200,000 m^{3} (3,405 acre⋅ft)
- Spillway type: Service, controlled overflow
- Spillway capacity: 2,400 m^{3}/s (84,755 cu ft/s)

Reservoir
- Creates: Garzan Reservoir
- Total capacity: 165,000,000 m^{3} (134,000 acre⋅ft)
- Active capacity: 145,000,000 m^{3} (118,000 acre⋅ft)
- Inactive capacity: 20,000,000 m^{3} (16,000 acre⋅ft)
- Catchment area: 1,266 km^{2} (489 sq mi)
- Surface area: 4 km^{2} (1.5 mi^{2})
- Maximum length: 20 km (12 mi)
- Normal elevation: 776 m (2,546 ft)

Power Station
- Operator: FERNAS Energy Electricity Generation Co. Inc.
- Installed capacity: 49 MW

Garzan Dam is an embankment dam on the Garzan River 9 km (5.6 mi) northeast of Kozluk in Batman Province, Turkey. It is part of the Southeastern Anatolia Project and has a primary purpose of hydroelectric power generation and irrigation. Surveys for the dam were completed in 2008, construction began in 2009 and the dam began to impound its reservoir in October 2012. The power plant has an installed capacity of 49 MW. The irrigation works remain under construction and are expected to irrigate an area of 40,000 ha (99,000 acres) when complete. The dam was awarded to FERNAS Energy Electricity Generation Co. Inc. in 2011 under a build–operate–transfer basis.
