= Suat Uğurlu Dam =

- Location within Turkey
- Official name: Suat Uğurlu Dam
- Location: Samsun, Turkey
- Coordinates: 41°01′47″N 36°38′51″E
- Construction began: 1975
- Opening date: 1982
- Operator: State Hydraulic Works (DSİ)

Dam and spillways
- Impounds: Yeşilırmak
- Height: 51 m (167 ft)

Reservoir
- Creates: Lake Suat Uğurlu Dam

The Suat Uğurlu Dam is a rock-fill dam for irrigation and hydro power purposes, located 24 km downstream of Hasan Uğurlu Dam on the River Yeşilırmak 13 km south of Çarşamba town and 25 km east of Samsun in northern Turkey. Originally, it was named the Bolahor Dam.

Suat Uğurlu died following an accident at the construction site of a dam project 24 km upstream together with her husband, an engineer at that site. While Ayvacık Dam was renamed after her husband's name Hasan Uğurlu, this dam was renamed in her memory.

Having a dam volume of 2,151,000 m³, Suat Uğurlu Dam and hydro-electric power plant went in service in 1982. The dam has a storage volume of 182 billion m³ in a reservoir area at normal water surface elevation of 9.7 km^{2}. The storage of Suat Uğurlu Dam is little but controlled by Hasan Uğurlu Hydro Power Plant. The area irrigated by the dam is 83,312 ha. The power plant generates 46 MW electricity, for annual total generation of 273 GWh.
