= Karkamış Dam =

Dam in Gaziantep, Turkey

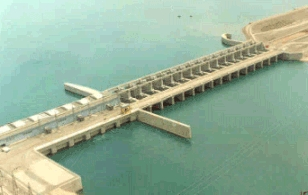

- Location within Turkey
- Official name: Karkamış Baraji
- Location: Gaziantep, Turkey
- Coordinates: 36°52′13″N 38°1′48″E
- Construction began: 1996
- Opening date: 2000
- Owner: State Hydraulic Works

Dam and spillways
- Type of dam: Embankment, concrete section
- Impounds: Euphrates River
- Height: 21.2 m (70 ft)
- Dam volume: 210,000 m^{3} (7,400,000 ft^{3})

Reservoir
- Creates: Karkamış Reservoir
- Total capacity: 157,000,000 m^{3} (5.5×10^{9} ft^{3})
- Surface area: 28.4 km^{2} (11.0 mi^{2})

Power Station
- Installed capacity: 189 MW (max)

Karkamış Dam is one of the 21 dams of the Southeastern Anatolia Project of Turkey. It is on the Euphrates River. The foundation of the dam was laid in 1996, and is 4.5 kilometres (2.8 mi) from the Syria border. The hydroelectric power plant has a total installed power capacity of 189 megawatts (253,000 hp).

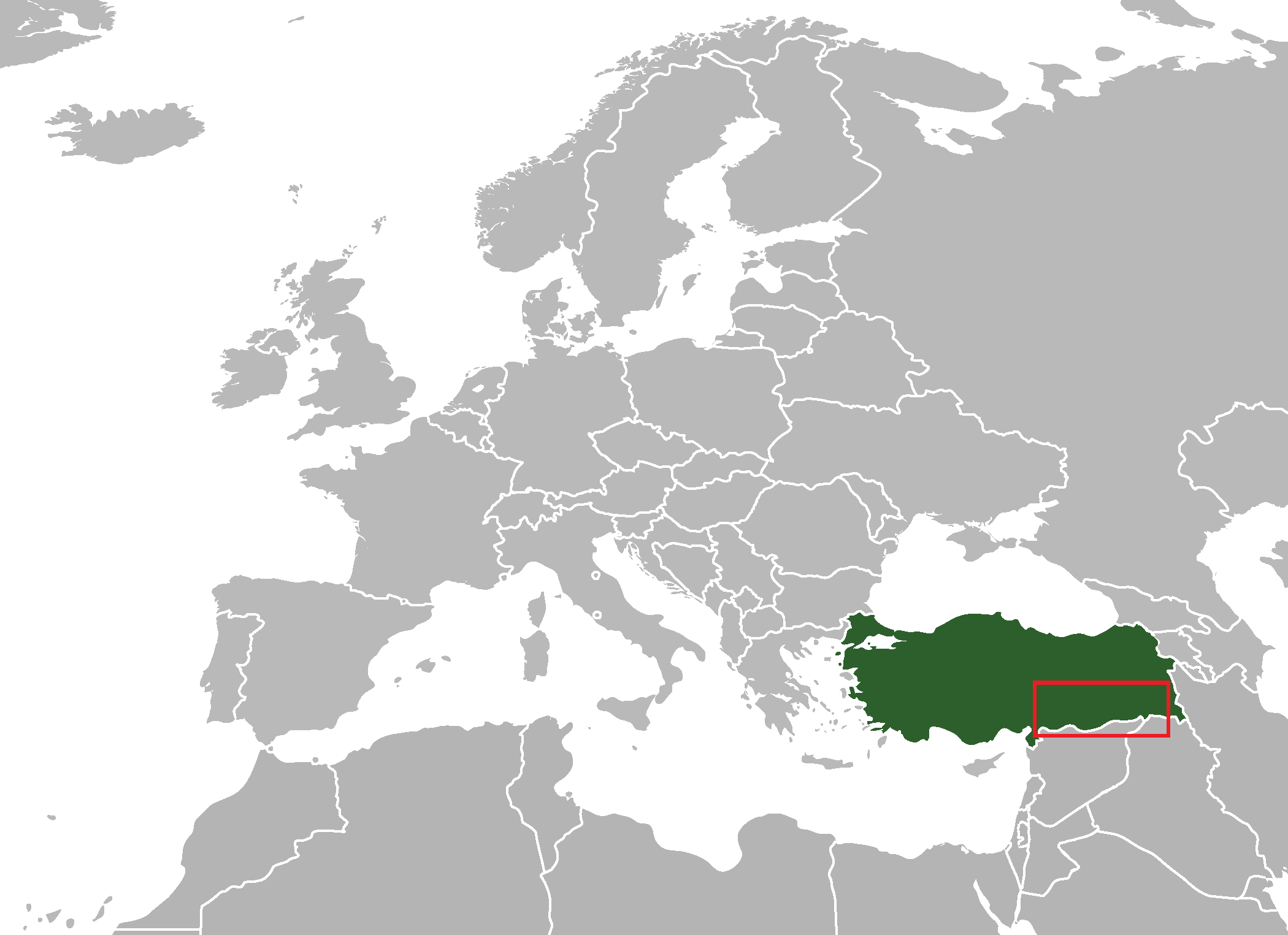
