= Arıkonak, Sincik =

Village in Adıyaman Province, Turkey

Arıkonak
- Village
- Location within Turkey
- Coordinates: 38.115°N 38.585°E
- Country: Turkey
- Province: Adıyaman
- District: Sincik
- Population (2021): 174
- Time zone: UTC+3 (TRT)

Arıkonak (Kurdish: Qomîk) is a village in the Sincik District, Adıyaman Province, Turkey. It is populated by Kurds of the Reşwan tribe and had a population of 174 in 2021.

The hamlets of Budak, Karaca, Küpeli, Örenbaşı and Yamaçlı are attached to Arıkonak.
