= Kralkızı Dam =

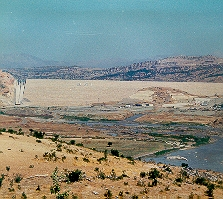

- Location within Turkey
- Official name: Kralkızı Barajı
- Location: Diyarbakır, Turkey
- Coordinates: 38°20′57″N 40°01′15″E
- Purpose: Power
- Status: Operational
- Construction began: 1985
- Opening date: 1997
- Owner: State Hydraulic Works

Dam and spillways
- Type of dam: Embankment, rock-fill
- Impounds: Maden River
- Height: 113 m (371 ft)
- Length: 1,030 m (3,379 ft)
- Elevation at crest: 819 m (2,687 ft)
- Width (crest): 12 m (39 ft)
- Width (base): 550 m (1,804 ft)
- Dam volume: 14,500,000 m^{3} (11,755 acre⋅ft)
- Spillway type: Service overflow, controlled-chute
- Spillway capacity: 2,300 m^{3}/s (81,224 cu ft/s)

Reservoir
- Creates: Kralkızı Reservoir
- Total capacity: 1,919,000,000 m^{3} (1,556,000 acre⋅ft)
- Active capacity: 1,711,000,000 m^{3} (1,387,000 acre⋅ft)
- Inactive capacity: 208,000,000 m^{3} (169,000 acre⋅ft)
- Catchment area: 1,300 km^{2} (502 sq mi)
- Surface area: 58 km^{2} (22 mi^{2})
- Maximum length: 26 km (16 mi)
- Normal elevation: 815.75 m (2,676.3 ft)

Power Station
- Hydraulic head: 71 m (233 ft) (gross)
- Turbines: 3 x 47 MW Francis-type
- Installed capacity: 94 MW
- Annual generation: 146 GWh

Kralkızı Dam is one of the 21 dams of the Southeastern Anatolia Project of Turkey in Batman. The hydroelectric power plant has a total installed power capacity of 94 MW. The dam was constructed between 1985 and 1997.

The amount of water in the Kralkızı Dam, which should have 2 billion cubic meters of water in its lake for electricity generation, dropped to 520 million cubic meters due to drought. Due to the decrease in the water level, electricity production was suspended for 46 days in January 2007, and it was reported that the water level should be at least 700 million cubic meters for energy production. These facilities are located on the Maden Stream, one of the important tributaries of the Tigris River, at a distance of 81 kilometres to Diyarbakır and 6 kilometres to the township of Dicle.
