= Çamdere, Sincik =

Village in Adıyaman Province, Turkey

Çamdere
- Village
- Location within Turkey
- Coordinates: 37.952°N 38.526°E
- Country: Turkey
- Province: Adıyaman
- District: Sincik
- Population (2021): 1,771
- Time zone: UTC+3 (TRT)

Çamdere (Kurdish: Palikan) is a village in the Sincik District, Adıyaman Province, Turkey. The village is populated by Kurds of the Reşwan tribe and had a population of 1,771 in 2021.

The hamlets of Ağaçlı, Deliyusuf, Küllüce, Tepecik and Toptaş are attached to Çamdere.
