= Çınarcık Dam =

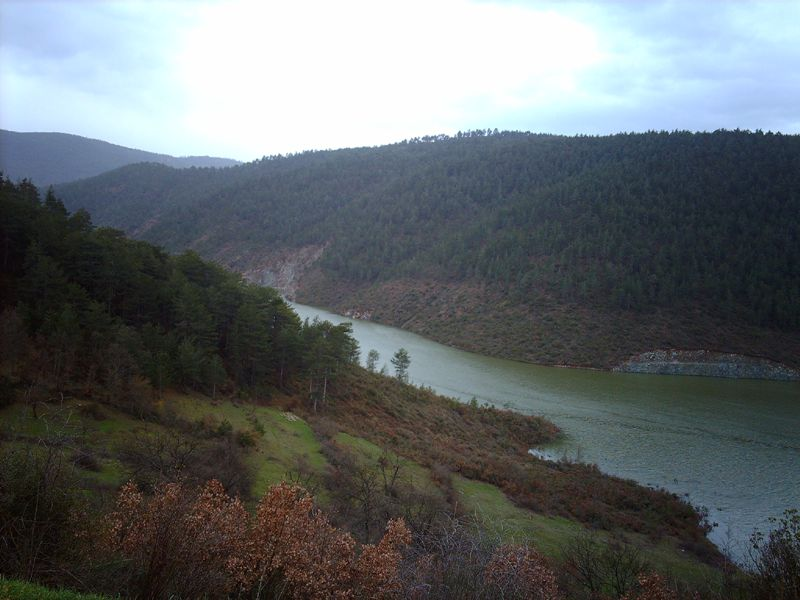
- Çınarcık reservoir begins to fill

- Location within Turkey
- Country: Turkey
- Location: Mustafakemalpaşa, Bursa Province
- Coordinates: 40°00′59.39″N 28°46′21.44″E
- Purpose: Power, irrigation, flood control
- Status: Operational
- Construction began: 1996
- Opening date: 2002
- Owner: Turkish State Hydraulic Works

Dam and spillways
- Type of dam: Embankment, rock-fill
- Impounds: Orhaneli River
- Height: 125 m (410 ft)
- Length: 325 m (1,066 ft)
- Elevation at crest: 333 m (1,093 ft)
- Width (crest): 12 m (39 ft)
- Spillway type: Service chute, five radial gates
- Spillway capacity: 5,191.8 m^{3}/s (183,347 cu ft/s)

Reservoir
- Total capacity: 373,000,000 m^{3} (302,396 acre⋅ft)
- Active capacity: 187,000,000 m^{3} (151,603 acre⋅ft)
- Surface area: 10 km^{2} (4 mi^{2})
- Normal elevation: 330 m (1,083 ft)

Uluabat Hydroelectric Station
- Coordinates: 40°9′10.96″N 28°43′25.25″E
- Commission date: 2010
- Type: Conventional, diversion
- Turbines: 2 x 50 MW vertical Francis-type
- Installed capacity: 100 MW
- Annual generation: 548 GWh

Çınarcık Dam is a rock-fill dam on the Orhaneli River about 30 km (19 mi) east of Mustafakemalpaşa in Bursa Province, Turkey. It serves several purposes to include power, irrigation, flood control and municipal water supply to the city of Bursa. The dam was constructed between 1996 and 2002. Construction of the Uluabat Hydroelectric Station, which the dam supplies water to, began in 2006 and it was commissioned in 2010. The 125 m (410 ft) tall dam diverts water north through an 11.27 km (7.00 mi) long tunnel where it reaches the power station on the southern bank of Lake Uluabat. Water discharged from the 100 MW power station then enters the lake. The dam and power station are owned by the Turkish State Hydraulic Works.

== See also ==
- List of dams and reservoirs in Turkey
