= Çatbahçe, Sincik =

Village in Adıyaman Province, Turkey

Çatbahçe
- Village
- Location within Turkey
- Coordinates: 37.972°N 38.605°E
- Country: Turkey
- Province: Adıyaman
- District: Sincik
- Population (2021): 965
- Time zone: UTC+3 (TRT)

Çatbahçe (Kurdish: Bêxce) is a village in the Sincik District, Adıyaman Province, Turkey. The village is populated by Kurds of the Reşwan tribe and had a population of 965 in 2021.

The hamlets of Akyazı (Çerxenek), Tandoğdu and Tepebaşı are attached to the village.
