= Aksu, Sincik =

Village in Adıyaman Province, Turkey

Aksu
- Village
- Location within Turkey
- Coordinates: 38.142°N 38.500°E
- Country: Turkey
- Province: Adıyaman
- District: Sincik
- Population (2021): 257
- Time zone: UTC+3 (TRT)

Aksu (Kurdish: Avaspî) is a village in the Sincik District, Adıyaman Province, Turkey. The village is populated by Kurds of the Reşwan tribe and had a population of 257.
