= Balkaya, Sincik =

Village in Adıyaman Province, Turkey

Balkaya
- Village
- Location within Turkey
- Coordinates: 38.0683°N 38.5853°E
- Country: Turkey
- Province: Adıyaman
- District: Sincik
- Population (2021): 268
- Time zone: UTC+3 (TRT)

Balkaya (Kurdish: Hecik) is a village in the Sincik District, Adıyaman Province, Turkey. The village is populated by Kurds of the Reşwan tribe and had a population of 268 in 2021.

The hamlets of Tokluca and Yaylabaşı are attached to the village.
