= Yamula Dam and Hydroelectric Plant =

Yamula Dam
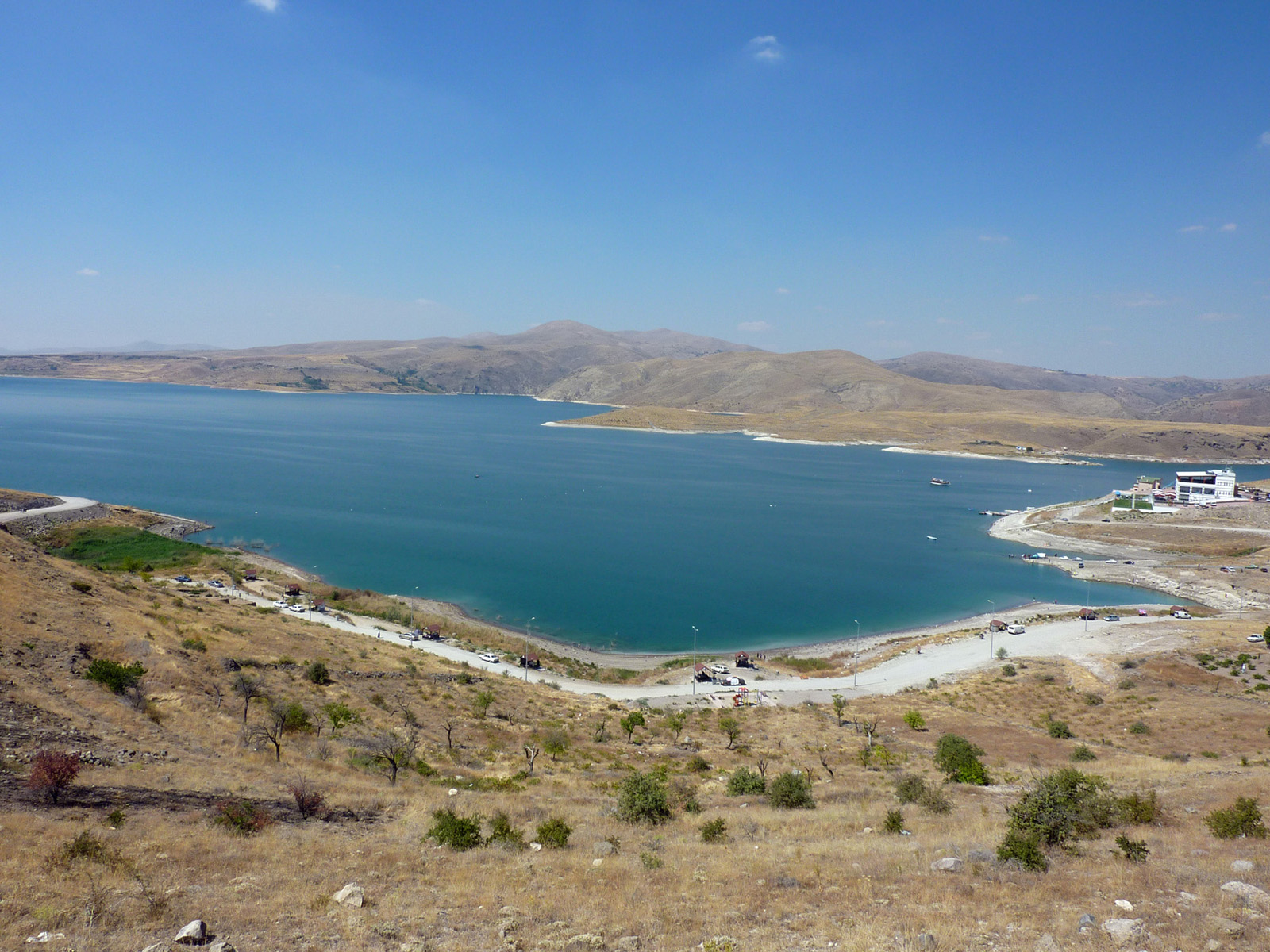
- Yamula Dam

- Location within Turkey
- Official name: Yamula Barajı
- Location: Kayseri Province, Turkey
- Coordinates: 38°53′33″N 35°15′59″E
- Owner: Turkish State Hydraulic Works

Dam and spillways
- Type of dam: High embankment
- Impounds: Kızılırmak River
- Height: 115 metres (377 ft)

Reservoir
- Creates: Yamula Reservoir
- Total capacity: 3,476 cubic hectometres (1.228×10^{11} cu ft)

Power Station
- Type: Conventional
- Installed capacity: 52 MW
- Annual generation: 309 GWh

Yamula Dam is a dam and hydroelectric plant in Kayseri Province on Kızılırmak River, central Turkey.

The dam is in Kayseri Province on Kızılırmak (Hallys of the Antiquity). The power production facility is at 38°53′33″N 35°15′59″E. Its waterholding phase began in 2005.

Being an artificial lake, it is home to various water sports.

According to the constructor Hidrodizayn, it is a barrage power plant located at the toe of a 115 metres (377 ft) high embankment dam with a total storage of 3,476 cubic hectometres (1.228×10^{11} cu ft). Nominal power is 52 MW and the annual energy production is 309 GW-hr. The 154 kV output connects via a 22 kilometres (14 mi) long line to the national interconnected grid system of Turkey. In addition to energy production, it is also used to irrigate agricultural land of 77,000 decares (77 km^{2}; 30 sq mi).
