= Hüseyinli, Sincik =

Village in Adıyaman Province, Turkey

Hüseyinli
- Village
- Location within Turkey
- Coordinates: 38.059°N 38.474°E
- Country: Turkey
- Province: Adıyaman
- District: Sincik
- Population (2021): 758
- Time zone: UTC+3 (TRT)

Hüseyinli (Kurdish: Husênan, Hisêncobar, Fexrikan) is a village in the Sincik District, Adıyaman Province, Turkey. The village is populated by Kurds of the Reşwan tribe and had a population of 758 in 2021.

The hamlets of Akbulut, Armutlu, Demirtepe, Kürik, Kürk, Öztaş and Taraklı are attached to Hüseyinli.
