= Ilısu Dam =

- Model of the dam

- Location within Turkey
- Official name: Ilısu Baraji
- Country: Turkey
- Location: Dargeçit, Mardin Province, Turkey
- Coordinates: 37°31′48″N 41°51′00″E
- Purpose: Power; Flood control Irrigation
- Status: Operational
- Construction began: 5 August 2006
- Opening date: February 2018
- Construction cost: US$1.7 billion
- Owner: State Hydraulic Works

Dam and spillways
- Type of dam: Embankment, concrete-face rock-fill
- Impounds: Tigris
- Height (thalweg): 135 m (443 ft)
- Length: 1,820 m (5,971 ft)
- Elevation at crest: 530 m (1,739 ft)
- Width (crest): 15 m (49 ft)
- Width (base): 610 m (2,001 ft)
- Dam volume: 43,800,000 m^{3} (35,509 acre⋅ft)
- Spillway type: Service overflow, controlled-chute
- Spillway capacity: 18,000 m^{3}/s (635,664 cu ft/s)

Reservoir
- Creates: Ilısu Reservoir
- Total capacity: 10,410,000,000 m^{3} (8,440,000 acre⋅ft)
- Active capacity: 7,460,000,000 m^{3} (6,050,000 acre⋅ft)
- Inactive capacity: 2,950,000,000 m^{3} (2,390,000 acre⋅ft)
- Catchment area: 35,517 km^{2} (13,713 sq mi)
- Surface area: 313 km^{2} (121 mi^{2})
- Maximum length: 244 km (152 mi) (combined)
- Maximum water depth: 126.8 m (416 ft)
- Normal elevation: 525 m (1,722 ft)

Power Station
- Commission date: 19 May 2020 (1st unit); Winter 2020–2021 (complete facility)
- Hydraulic head: 122.6 m (402 ft) (gross)
- Turbines: 6 x 200 MW Francis-type
- Installed capacity: 1,200 MW
- Annual generation: 3,833 GWh (est.)
- Website ilisuprojesi.com

The Ilısu Dam (Turkish pronunciation: [ɯɫɯˈsu]) is a concrete-face rock-fill dam on the Tigris near the village of Ilısu and along the border of Mardin and Şırnak Provinces in Turkey. It is one of the 22 dams of the Southeastern Anatolia Project and its purpose is hydroelectric power production, flood control and water storage. When operational, the dam will support a 1,200 MW power station and will form a 10.4 billion m^{3} reservoir. Construction of the dam began in 2006 and was originally expected to be completed by 2016. As part of the project, the much smaller Cizre Dam is to be constructed downstream for irrigation and power. The dam has drawn international controversy, because it will flood portions of ancient Hasankeyf and necessitate the relocation of people living in the region. Because of this, the dam lost international funding in 2008. Most historical structures in Hasankeyf were moved to the new Hasankeyf prior to the filling of the dam. The dam began to fill its reservoir in late July 2019. Due to rainfall, the dam has achieved water levels up to 100m above the river bed and stored 5 billion cubic meters of water. The water level had reached an elevation of 498.2m on 1 April 2020.

DSI has started testing 2 turbines for energy production after completing the spillway testing. The dam reservoir has attained a water volume of 7.6 billion cubic meters. Water storage crest level was 513m on 19 April 2020. It would need 12m rise to achieve the maximum storage level.

The first of six generators was commissioned on 19 May 2020, while its power plant is scheduled to reach full capacity by the end of 2020. Three hydro-turbines have been commissioned since 19 June 2020 and the remaining three are being tested. So far the dam has contributed 51M$ energy towards economy.

== Design ==
The Ilısu Dam will be a 135 m (443 ft) high and 1,820 m (5,971 ft) wide rock-fill embankment dam with a structural volume of 43,900,000 m^{3} (35,590 acre⋅ft). It will be 15 m (49 ft) wide at its crest and 610 m (2,001 ft) wide at its base. The dam will have an overflow spillway on its right bank which will be controlled by eight radial gates which will pour into four chutes before the water reaches a plunge pool. Its power station will be above ground and will contain 6 x 200 MW Francis turbine-generators with an expected annual generation of 3,833 GWh and gross hydraulic head of 122.6 m (402 ft). The dam's reservoir will have a capacity of 10,400,000,000 m^{3} (8,431,417 acre⋅ft), of which 7,460,000,000 m^{3} (6,050,000 acre⋅ft) will be active (or live, useful) storage and 2,950,000,000 m^{3} (2,390,000 acre⋅ft) will be inactive (dead) storage. At a normal elevation of 525 m (1,722 ft) above sea level, the reservoir surface area will cover 313 km^{2} (121 sq mi).

== Background ==
Beginning in 1954 the Turkish government surveyed 53 kilometres (33 miles) of the Tigris river downstream of Diyarbakır with the aim of identifying suitable locations for a hydroelectric power plant at an elevation below 550 metres (1,800 ft). Turkey's Electric Power Resources Survey and Development Administration (EIE) included 10 potential sites in its 1971 Tigris River Pre-Investigation Report. By 1975, the EIE had completed a technical and economic evaluation of the sites. Ilısu was selected as the preferred site for geological reasons. A feasibility study and final design by international consultants (1980–82) resulted in a recommendation to construct both the Ilısu Dam and the Cizre Dam downstream.

There was little movement on the project for more than 15 years until the dam was added to the State Hydraulic Works' formal construction program in 1997 or 1998.

On 5 August 2006, the foundation stone for the dam was laid and initial construction began.

=== Funding issues ===
To avoid inflation and other economic repercussions, the Turkish Government has often sought outside assistance to fund the Ilısu Dam Project. However, pressure from environmental and human rights groups have often halted this process. In 2000, the British Government declined $236 million in funding for the Ilısu Dam. Before the 2006 ground-breaking ceremony, German, Swiss and Austrian export credit agencies had agreed to fund $610 million of the project. In December 2008, the European firms suspended funds for the dam and gave Turkey a 180-day period to comply with over 150 international standards. In June 2009, after failing to meet the standards, the European firms officially cut the funding for the Ilısu Dam Project. Shortly after the announcement of the funding loss, Turkey's Environment Minister Veysel Eroğlu said, "Let me tell you this, these power plants will be built. No one can stop it. This is the decision of the state and the government." Turkey's Prime Minister Recep Tayyip Erdoğan is also committed to the Ilısu Dam Project as well and claims Turkey will use internal or other international funding. Turkey stated that construction would start again in July 2009. In February 2010, it was announced that loans had been granted and the project would continue. On 15 July 2010, Andritz Hydro lifted a temporary suspension on supplying parts to the project and announced it would provide the six 200 MW Francis turbines for the power plant.

== Construction ==
As part of early and ongoing construction, 52 km (32 mi) of roads are subject to raising and repairing work. A 110 m (361 ft) long temporary bridge was constructed upstream of the dam site which is supported by 30 sections of steel pipe. Additionally, a 250 m (820 ft) permanent steel-girder bridge with concrete supports was constructed just downstream of the dam. Construction of new Ilısu and Koçtepe villages were underway as well as the relocation of major portions of Hasankeyf. Excavations for the main body of the dam began in May 2011 and the first loads of fill were laid in January 2012. Diversion of the Tigris River began during a ceremony on 29 August 2012. As of April 2014, the project is 60% complete while the resettlement of Hasankeyf is 73% complete. All works are expected to be completed in 2015.

In 2014, the dam, as well as others in southeast Turkey such as the Silvan Dam, became a prime target of Kurdistan Workers' Party (PKK) militants after peace talks collapsed with the government. Attacks on the dam, supporting structures and workers are part of the PKK's efforts to stop construction. Construction of the dam was suspended temporarily late in the year. On 3 February 2015, a convoy of supplies for the dam was attacked, injuring three. Several days later a worker was killed in his home by suspected PKK militants.

The construction reached 96% in June 2017. In February 2018, construction on the dam was completed. On 1 June 2018, the reservoir was to begin impoundment but was delayed until November then 2019 following another detail due to water shortages in Iraq. Impoundment began in late July 2019. As of November 2019, the hydroelectric power generation would start in February 2020.

Due to rainfalls dam has achieved the water elevation level of 498.2m as of 1 April 2020.

Ilisu Dam has attained water level of 513m on 19 April 2020, and it is less than 12m from the maximum conservation level of 525m, according to CNN Türk citing the State Hydraulic Works (DSI) by an AA correspondent.

== Controversy ==
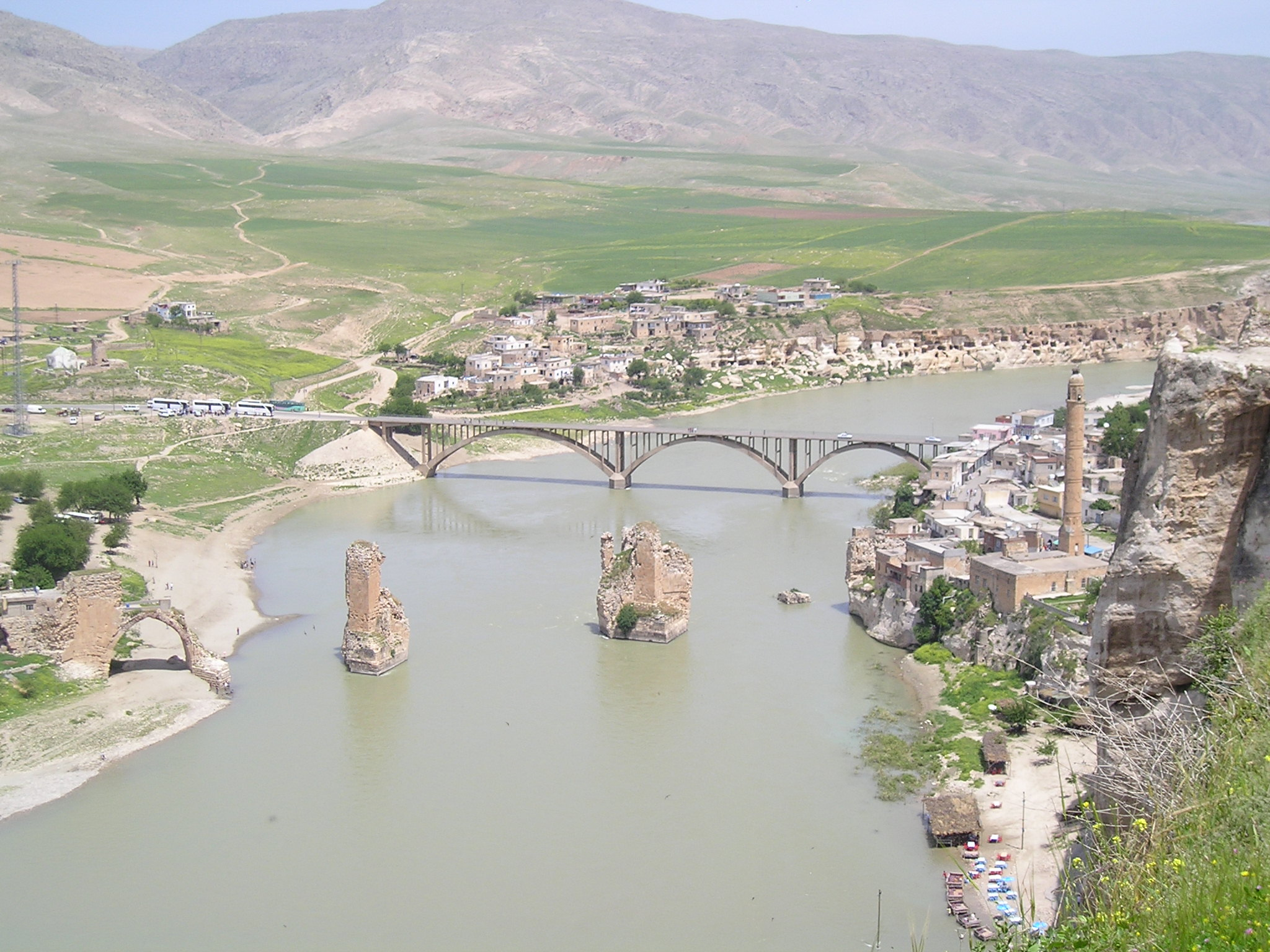
The Tigris flowing past the town of Hasankeyf, much of which was flooded by the filling of the dam

Completion of the Ilısu Dam caused the flooding of the majority of the ancient city of Hasankeyf, whose history stretches back over 10,000 years. About 199 settlements (villages and hamlets) will be fully or partially affected by flooding as well. This figure excludes vacant settlements, which will also be inundated. Three decades of conflict between the Turkish government and the PKK has resulted in the depopulation of many hamlets in the area, and so now their original inhabitants will never be able to return home either, in addition to the others who still live in the region. In 2006, the Turkish government estimated that 61,620 people would be "physically or economically displaced". Using 1990 census data, it had previously estimated that 55,127 people would be affected; updating these calculations using 2000 survey data produced a figure of 71,186.

The official Turkish government line was expressed by then-Prime Minister Recep Tayyip Erdoğan at the ground-breaking ceremony in 2006: "The step that we are taking today demonstrates that the south-east is no longer neglected. This dam will bring big gains to the local people." The government says the project will generate 10,000 jobs, spur agricultural production through irrigation and boost tourism, although others argue that the tourism industry will be ruined due to the loss of Hasankeyf and that the local people will be forced to move to cities because the amount of money they were given to buy new homes in the region is insufficient.

== Impact on downstream countries ==
After the completion of the dam's construction in early spring 2018, the Iraqi government approached the Turkish authorities to postpone filling of the proposed Ilısu reservoir until the end of June in the same year, due to the fact that the Tigris river has its highest levels during spring time. However, water shortages were witnessed in the Mosul dam, where water in the reservoir had more than 3 billion cubic meters compared with its levels of more than 8 billion cubic meters in the same period of the previous year. Moreover, the southern governorates of Iraq had the lowest portions of the river in years, in which the total Tigris water share in Iraq fell from 21 billion cubic metres to only 9.7 billion cubic metres instead. Such impacts which might lead to the drainage of the Mesopotamian Marshes and destruction of its ecology system, were part of the reasons to the emergence of a new wave of Iraqi protests, along with several other issues, especially in Basra Governorate.

In addition, water shortages, lack of rainfall and depleted soils led nearly to a halt in farming rice, corn, sesame, sunflower seeds and cotton; and a decrease in the area planted for wheat and barley by half for the 2018–19 season.

== See also ==
- Ilısu Dam Campaign
- List of power stations in Turkey
- Southeastern Anatolia Project

== Sources ==
- Ilısu Dam and HEPP: Environmental Impact Assessment Report (PDF), Ankara: Ilısu Consortium, 31 July 2005, archived from the original (PDF) on 26 September 2015
- Ilısu Dam and HEPP Project: Amendments on Updated Resettlement Action Plan (URAP) (PDF), Ankara: Ilısu Consortium, May 2006, archived from the original (PDF) on 2015-11-12
- "Description and History". Ilisu Baraji.
- "Turkey begins controversial dam". BBC News. 5 August 2006.
- Harte, Julia (August 22, 2013). "Rare Footage of Ilısu: The Dam That Will Flood Homes and History Across Southern Turkey". National Geographic. Archived from the original on April 11, 2015.
