= Batman Dam =

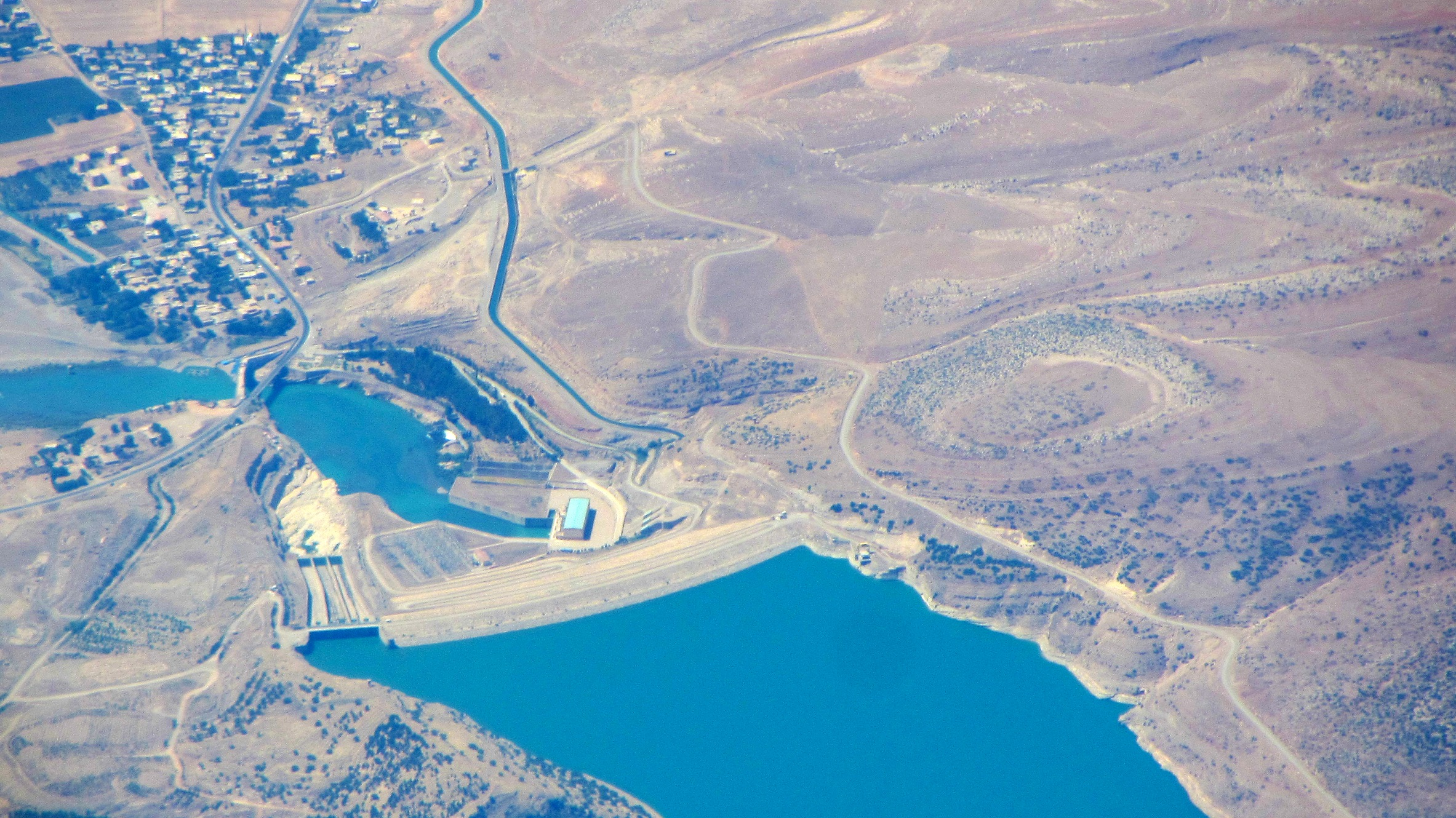

- Location within Turkey
- Interactive map of Batman Dam
- Official name: Batman Baraji
- Location: Batman, Turkey in Batman Province
- Coordinates: 38°17′28.47″N 41°01′24.84″E
- Purpose: Power, irrigation
- Status: Operational
- Construction began: 1986
- Opening date: 1999
- Owner: State Hydraulic Works

Dam and spillways
- Type of dam: Embankment, earth and rock-fill
- Impounds: Batman River
- Height: 74 m (243 ft)
- Length: 510 m (1,673 ft)
- Elevation at crest: 670 m (2,198 ft)
- Width (crest): 12 m (39 ft)
- Width (base): 300 m (984 ft)
- Dam volume: 4,000,000 m^{3} (3,243 acre⋅ft)
- Spillway type: Service, controlled-chute
- Spillway capacity: 8,200 m^{3}/s (289,580 cu ft/s)

Reservoir
- Creates: Batman Reservoir
- Total capacity: 1,175,000,000 m^{3} (953,000 acre⋅ft)
- Active capacity: 738,000,000 m^{3} (598,000 acre⋅ft)
- Inactive capacity: 447,000,000 m^{3} (362,000 acre⋅ft)
- Catchment area: 4,105 km^{2} (1,585 sq mi)
- Surface area: 49 km^{2} (19 mi^{2})
- Maximum length: 15 km (9.3 mi)
- Normal elevation: 665 m (2,182 ft)

Power Station
- Commission date: 1998 est.
- Hydraulic head: 61.8 m (203 ft) (gross)
- Turbines: 3 x 62 MW, 1 x 5.7 MW Francis-type
- Installed capacity: 160 MW

Batman Dam is one of the 22 dams of the Southeastern Anatolia Project of Turkey, built on the Batman River, north of Batman, in southeastern of Turkey. It was constructed between 1986 and 1999. There is a hydroelectric power plant, established in 1998, at the dam, with a power output of 191.7 MW. The dam is designed to service an irrigation area of 37,744 ha (93,270 acres). The Silvan Dam is located upstream.
