= Eskiköy, Sincik =

Village in Adıyaman Province, Turkey

Eskiköy
- Village
- Location within Turkey
- Coordinates: 38.039°N 38.537°E
- Country: Turkey
- Province: Adıyaman
- District: Sincik
- Population (2021): 307
- Time zone: UTC+3 (TRT)

Eskiköy is a village in the Sincik District, Adıyaman Province, Turkey. Its population is 307 (2021).
