= Obruk Dam =

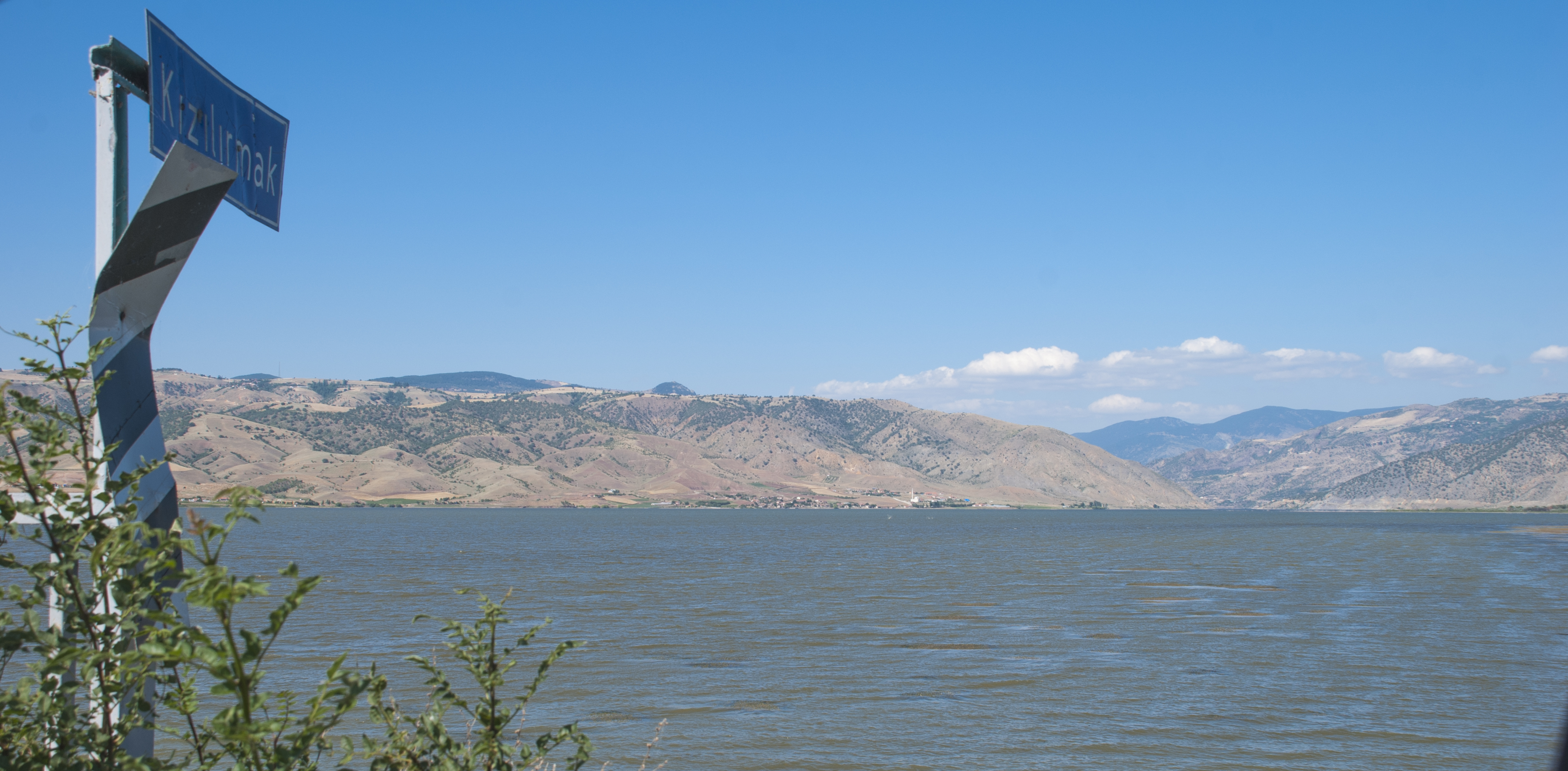

- Location within Turkey
- Location: Turkey
- Coordinates: 40°46′13″N 34°47′17″E
- Construction began: 1996
- Opening date: 2007

Dam and spillways
- Impounds: Kızılırmak River
- Height: 67 m (220 ft)

Reservoir
- Total capacity: 661,000,000 m^{3} (535,881 acre⋅ft)

Power Station
- Commission date: 2009
- Turbines: 4 x 50.5 MW Francis-type
- Installed capacity: 202 MW
- Annual generation: 473 GWh

Obruk Dam is an embankment dam on the Kızılırmak River in Çorum Province, Turkey. Constructed between 1996 and 2007, the development was backed by the Turkish State Hydraulic Works. The dam supports a 203 MW power station.

== See also ==
- List of dams and reservoirs in Turkey
