= Pınarbaşı, Sincik =

Village in Adıyaman Province, Turkey

Pınarbaşı
- Village
- Location within Turkey
- Coordinates: 37.988°N 38.691°E
- Country: Turkey
- Province: Adıyaman
- District: Sincik
- Population (2021): 230
- Time zone: UTC+3 (TRT)

Pınarbaşı (Kurdish: Kiran) is a village in the Sincik District, Adıyaman Province, Turkey. The village is populated by Kurds of the Reşwan and had a population of 230 in 2021.

The hamlets of Akçalı, Çakoli, Revrişe and Şahkolu are attached to the village.
