= Dilektepe, Sincik =

Village in Adıyaman Province, Turkey

Dilektepe
- Village
- Location within Turkey
- Coordinates: 37.966°N 38.542°E
- Country: Turkey
- Province: Adıyaman
- District: Sincik
- Population (2021): 743
- Time zone: UTC+3 (TRT)

Dilektepe (Kurdish: Kalikan) is a village in the Sincik District, Adıyaman Province, Turkey. The village is populated by Kurds of the Reşwan tribe and had a population of 743 in 2021.

The hamlets of Güveçli, Güvendik, Kasnaklı and Yolcular are attached to the village.
