= Yarpuzlu, Sincik =

Village in Adıyaman Province, Turkey

Yarpuzlu
- Village
- Location within Turkey
- Coordinates: 38.057°N 38.520°E
- Country: Turkey
- Province: Adıyaman
- District: Sincik
- Population (2021): 571
- Time zone: UTC+3 (TRT)

Yarpuzlu (Kurdish: Birimşe) is a village in the Sincik District, Adıyaman Province, Turkey. The village is populated by Kurds of the Reşwan tribe and had a population of 571 in 2021.
