= Narlı, Sincik =

Village in Adıyaman Province, Turkey

Narlı
- Village
- Location within Turkey
- Coordinates: 38.064°N 38.548°E
- Country: Turkey
- Province: Adıyaman
- District: Sincik
- Population (2021): 214
- Time zone: UTC+3 (TRT)

Narlı (Kurdish: Pamli) is a village in the Sincik District, Adıyaman Province, Turkey. The village is populated by Kurds of the Reşwan tribe and had a population of 214 in 2021.

The hamlet of Akdağ is attached to Narlı.
