= Hasan Uğurlu Dam =

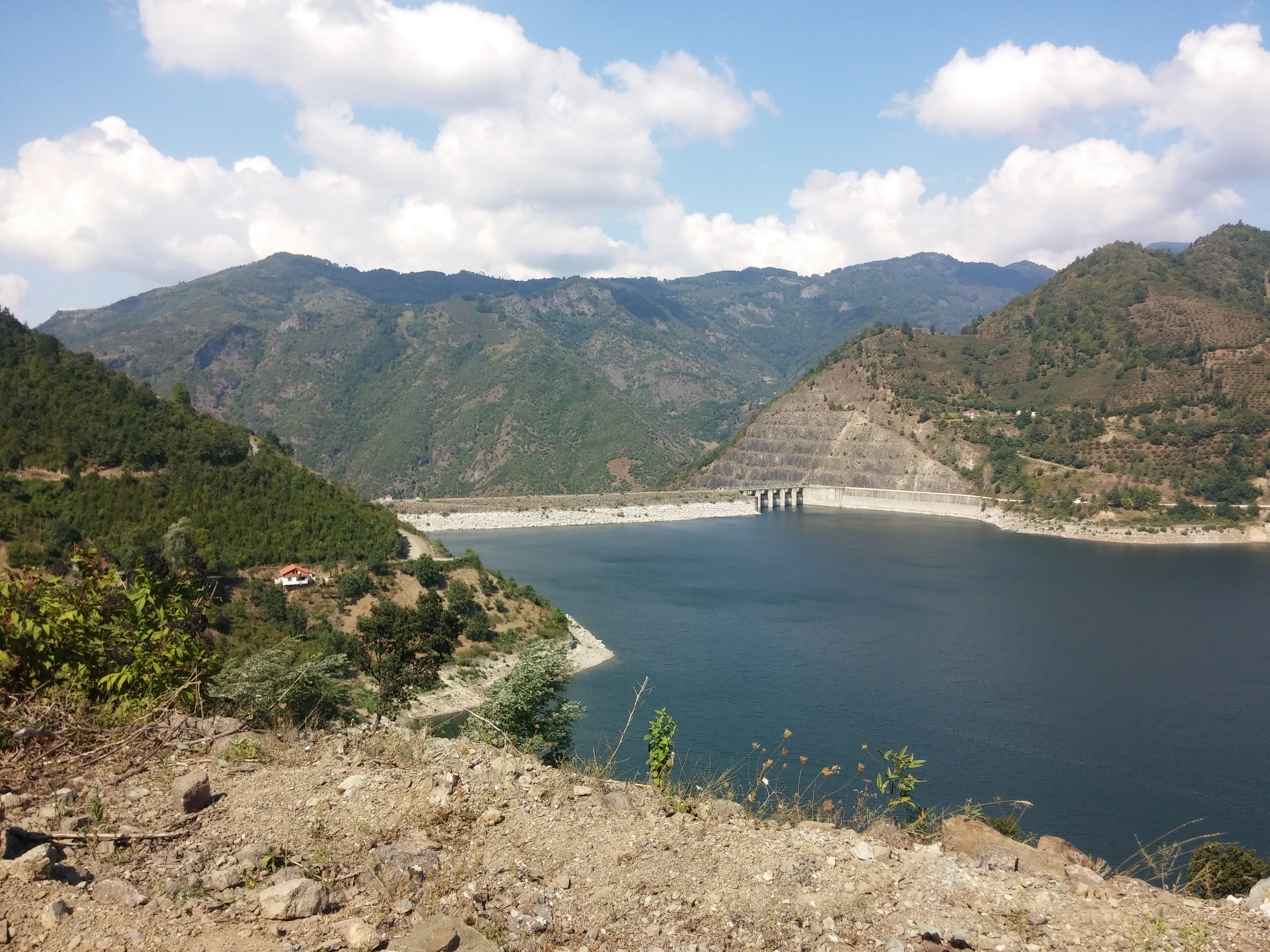
- Hasan Uğurlu Dam
- Official name: Hasan Uğurlu Dam
- Location: Samsun, Turkey
- Coordinates: 40°56′12″N 36°38′48″E
- Construction began: 1971
- Opening date: 1981
- Operator(s): State Hydraulic Works (DSİ)

Dam and spillways
- Impounds: Yeşilırmak
- Height: 175 m (574 ft)

Reservoir
- Creates: Lake Hasan Uğurlu Dam

The Hasan Uğurlu Dam is a rock-fill dam for hydro power purposes, located on the River Yeşilırmak 23 km south of Çarşamba town and 25 km east of Samsun in northern Turkey. Originally, it was named the Ayvacık Dam. Completed in 1979, it generates 4x125=500 MW of power giving an annual electricity production of 1,217 GWh.

Hasan Uğurlu was an engineer, who died together with his wife following an accident while working at this dam's project. His wife's name Suat Uğurlu is given to another dam project 24 km downstream of Hasan Uğurlu Dam at the same times.

Having a dam volume of 9,600,000 m³, Hasan Uğurlu Dam was completed in 1979. It has a storage volume of 1,074 billion m³ in a reservoir area at normal water surface elevation of 22.7 km^{2}.
