= Uğurlu, Sincik =

Village in Adıyaman Province, Turkey

Uğurlu
- Village
- Location within Turkey
- Coordinates: 38.056°N 38.457°E
- Country: Turkey
- Province: Adıyaman
- District: Sincik
- Population (2021): 129
- Time zone: UTC+3 (TRT)

Uğurlu is a village in the Sincik District of Adıyaman Province in Turkey. The village had a population of 129 in 2021.

The hamlets of Çal, Eliaçık, Eskisu, Işık, Kolbaşı, Tosunkaya and Ürünlü are attached to the village.
