= Alancık, Sincik =

Village in Adıyaman Province, Turkey

Alancık
- Village
- Location within Turkey
- Coordinates: 38.0394°N 38.5584°E
- Country: Turkey
- Province: Adıyaman
- District: Sincik
- Population (2021): 578
- Time zone: UTC+3 (TRT)

Alancık (Kurdish: Lagin) is a village in the Sincik District, Adıyaman Province, Turkey. The village is populated by Kurds of the Reşwan tribe and had a population of 578 in 2021.

The hamlet of Küsran is attached to the village.
