= Taşkale, Sincik =

Village in Adıyaman Province, Turkey

Taşkale
- Village
- Location within Turkey
- Coordinates: 38.038°N 38.721°E
- Country: Turkey
- Province: Adıyaman
- District: Sincik
- Population (2021): 225
- Time zone: UTC+3 (TRT)

Taşkale (Kurdish: Tixînkar) is a village in the Sincik District, Adıyaman Province, Turkey. The village is populated by Kurds of the Îzol tribe and had a population of 225 in 2021.

The hamlets of Damlı, Ekinci, Kalımlı and Sağlam are attached to the village.
