= Batman River =

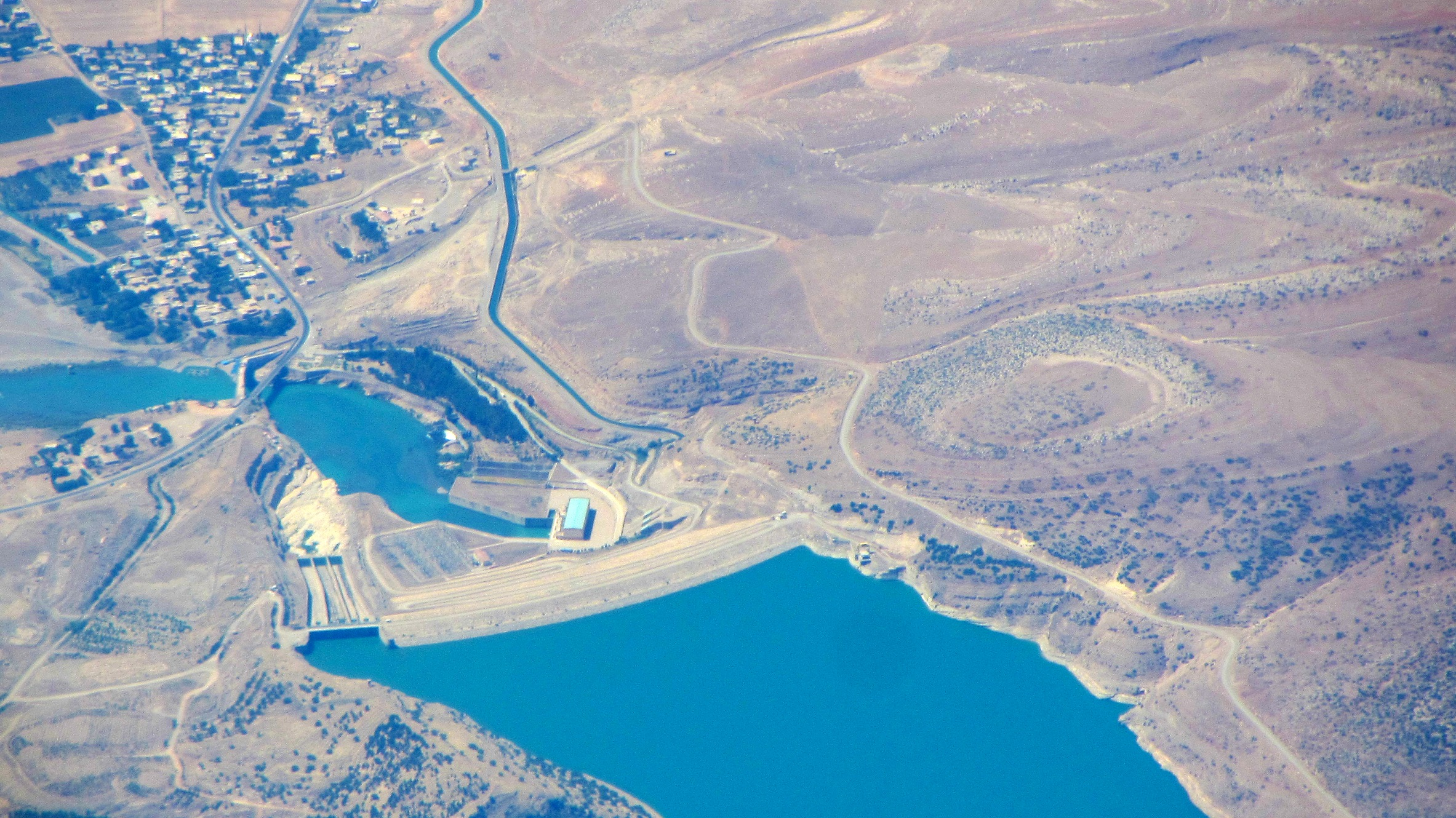
- Batman River Dam

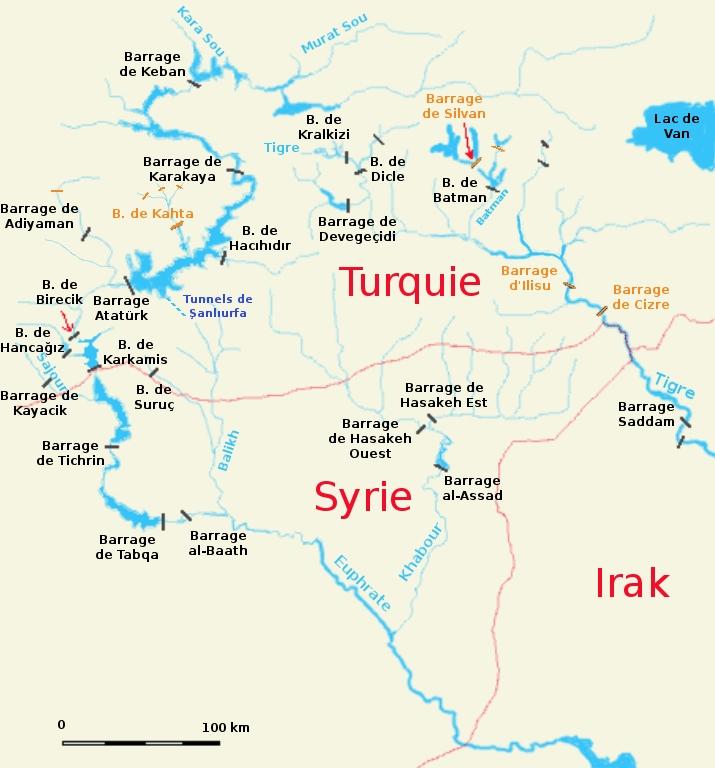

Location
- Country: Turkey

Physical characteristics
- Mouth
  - location: Tigris (Dicle)
- Length: 115 km (71 mi)

The Batman River is a major tributary of the Tigris in southeast Turkey. The region along the Batman River is known for its oil fields.

== Course ==
The river originates in Turkey's Anti-Taurus Mountains (at the Sason and Genç mountains) and flows approximately from north to south, passing near the city of Batman and forming a natural border between the Batman Province and Diyarbakır Province. The historic Malabadi Bridge (built in 1146–1147) crosses the river near the town of Silvan.

The river is widest at about 100 metres (330 ft) right after exiting the dam, but then narrows to about 50 metres (160 ft) and forms numerous splits along its way to the Tigris. Its riverbed is irregular in many places, promoting flooding. A tributary of Batman, the Iluh River, originates in the Raman Mountain on the south of the Batman city and flows north-west through the city into the Batman River. Despite being a small river, absent on most maps, Iluh plays an important role for the province because its spring floods affect the provincial capital. The floods of Iluh and Batman rivers occur between March and May and sometimes in October or November. Major floods occurred in 1969 (April, 60 buildings damaged), 1972 (April and May, 210 buildings damaged), 1991 (November, 500 buildings flooded), 1995 (March, nearly 1000 buildings submerged and 450 damaged) and 2006 (October, 11 people died and 20 injured).

== Name ==
In Antiquity, the Batman River was known as Kalat. This name meant "bride" to the Syriac people who populated the area, and was translated into Greek as Nymphios (Νυμφίος, Latinized Nymphius) and Nymphaios (Νυμφαῖος, Latinized Nymphaeus). Among Arabs it was known as Satidama, meaning "the bloody" reflecting the battles fought near it.

In international literature, the name Batman came into use in the 19th century, whereas in the 18th century and before it was mostly referred to as Nymphius, among other names. The origin of the name "Batman" is unclear: it might be a shortening of the name of the 1,228-metre (4,029 ft) tall Bati Raman mountain located nearby or refer to the unit of weight used in the Ottoman Empire.

== History ==
The river served as a natural border between the Byzantine Empire and Sassanid Persia and saw major battles in 583 and 591 AD. The main citadel on the river was Martyropolis, modern-day Silvan.

The Batman Dam (Turkish: Batman Barajı, B. de Batman on the map) was built in 1999 in the upstream (38°09′36″N 41°12′06″E), together with the associated reservoir and hydroelectric power plant.

== Wildlife ==
The Batman River loach (Paraschistura chrysicristinae) is a critically endangered fish native to the Batman and Ambar rivers. The fish is endangered by drought, habitat destruction, and habitat fragmentation from construction of the Batman Dam. It had not been observed since 1974 and was feared to be extinct until a 2021 expedition netted 14 fish living above the Batman Dam.
