= State Hydraulic Works =

Government agency of Turkey

- Devlet Su İşleri (DSİ)

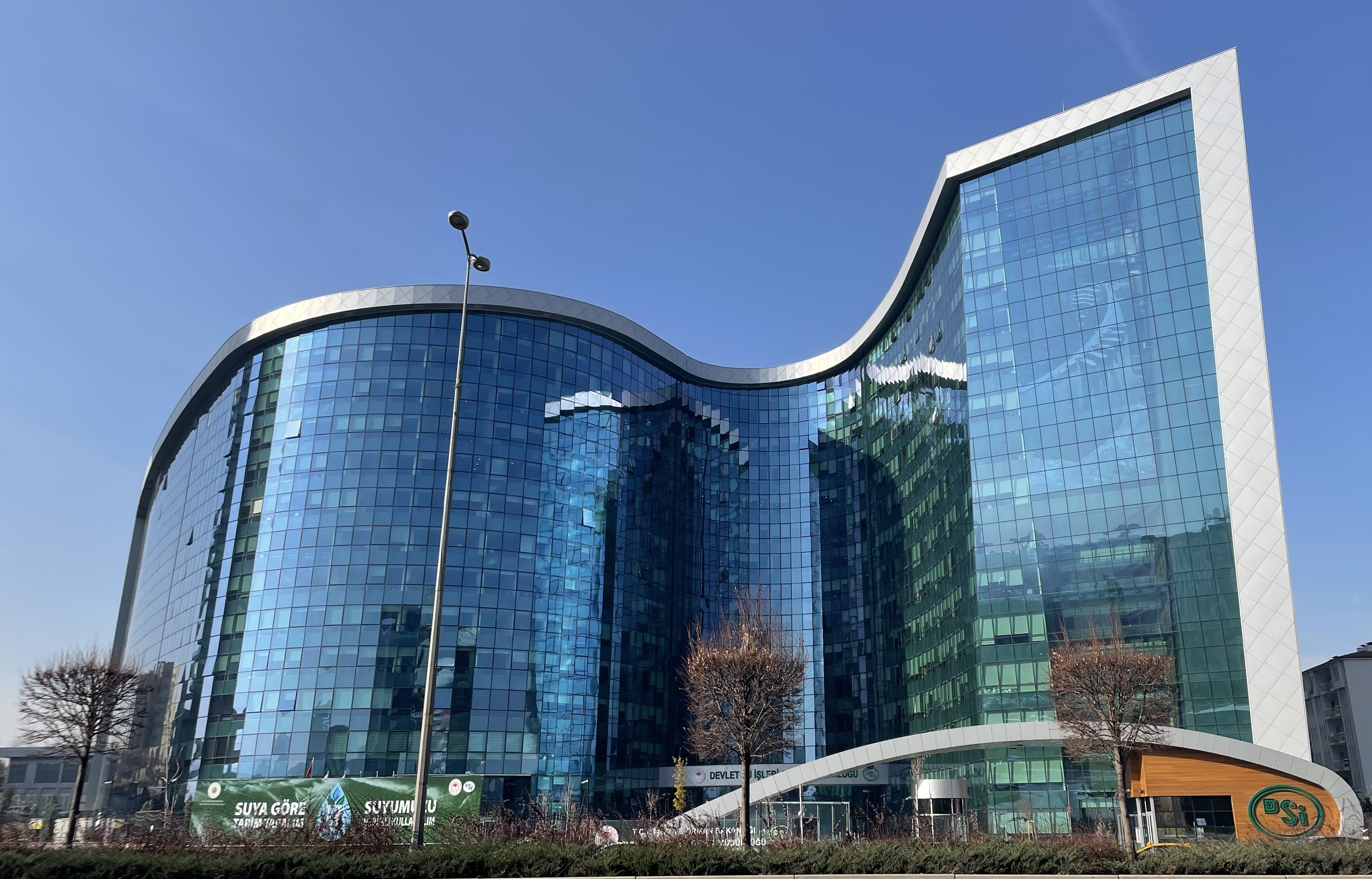

Agency overview
- Formed: 1954
- Jurisdiction: Government of Turkey
- Headquarters: Ankara
- Employees: 20,184
- Annual budget: 8,873,363,000 TL
- Agency executive: Director-General, Murat Acu
- Parent agency: Ministry of Forest and Water Management
- Website: www.dsi.gov.tr

The State Hydraulic Works (Turkish: Devlet Su İşleri) is a state agency, under the Ministry of Environment and Forestry of Turkey, responsible for the utilization of all the country's water resources. The institution's four major functions are energy, agriculture, services and environment. The General Manager of DSI is Kaya Yıldız.

== History ==
Development of water resources in Turkey began with the establishment of the "General Directorate of Public Works" (Ottoman Turkish: Umur-u Nafia Müdüriyet-i Umumiyesi) by the Ottoman Government in 1914. The institution started to undertake continuous and systematical studies on irrigation, reclamation, flood control, navigation, water storage and distribution.

in 1925, soon after the foundation of the Turkish Republic, regional offices were opened in Adana, Ankara, Bursa, Edirne and İzmir under the "Waters Directorate". Due to insufficient financial resources and field observations data available, water projects could not be expedited as planned. Severe drought, occurred in 1929, led to the establishment of the more comprehensive institution of "Waters General Directorate". In 1939, it was reorganized in "Water Works General Directorate". The agency conducted studies on feasibility, planning, gauging and water level recording.

Finally in 1954, the institution was named "General Directorate of State Hydraulic Works" and assigned to the Ministry of Public Works. State Hydraulic Works was reassigned later to the Ministry of Energy and Natural Resources. Since not a long time, the agency reports to the minister of environment and forestry.

== Organization ==
The State Hydraulic Works is organized in three levels: The management, the department offices and the regional offices. While the first two levels are located in Ankara, the 25 regional offices are dispersed throughout Turkey.

Major functions of the regional offices are primarily collection of data in the field of mapping, conducting hydrometric measurements, surveying agricultural economy, land classification, drainage, groundwater and geology, and secondly to evaluate them for the planning, construction and operation of water structures.

== Projects ==
Since its establishment in 1954, State Hydraulic Works has made investments in the sector of energy for US$30.0 billion, agriculture for US$39.0 billion and services for US$12.0 billion, totaling up to US$81.0 billion.

=== Energy ===
Of the 135 hydroelectric power plants in Turkey, State Hydraulic Works operates 53, which have a total installed capacity of 10,215 MW (29% of the country's total electric power capacity) and generated in 2003 electricity of 35,329 GWh (25.1% of the total).

State Hydraulic Works has currently 24 HEPPs throughout the country under construction with a total installed capacity of 2,722 MW and annual generation of 8,920 GWh.

=== Agriculture ===
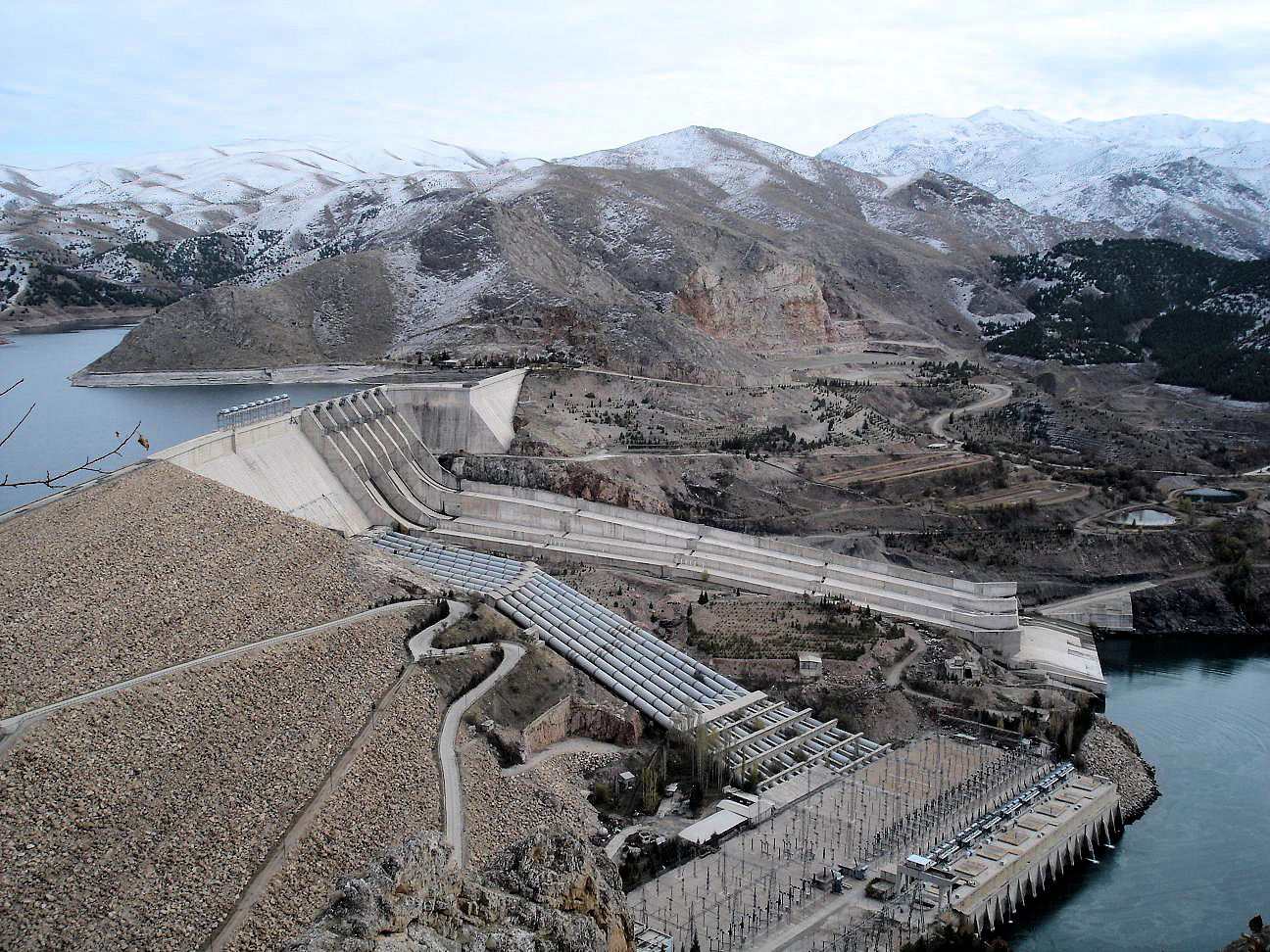
Keban Dam: the first and uppermost of several big dams built on the Euphrates.

Turkey has a total of 280,000 square kilometres of agricultural area, of which 85,000 km^{2} is economically irrigable and 49,000 km^{2} is currently being irrigated. As of 2005, an area of 28,000 km^{2} is equipped with facilities of State Hydraulic Works's irrigation projects, making 10% of the total agricultural area and 57% of the irrigated area in Turkey.

==== Southeastern Anatolia Project (GAP) ====
The Southeastern Anatolia Project (Turkish: Güneydoğu Anadolu Projesi or GAP), a very important integrated project for the economic and social development of the Southeastern Anatolia Region, includes active farming with extensive irrigation systems and electricity generation. The project area covers the lower parts of the Euphrates and Tigris rivers in the 9 provinces of the region (Gaziantep, Adıyaman, Kilis, Şanlıurfa, Diyarbakır, Mardin, Siirt, Batman, and Şırnak), where a total of 6.5 million people live as of the 2000 census.

The project is one of the biggest investments of the last century undertaken by State Hydraulic Works and contains 13 sub-projects, 7 of which are in the Euphrates Basin and 6 of which are in the Tigris Basin. Within the scope of these 13 projects, 27,000 GWh hydroelectric energy will be produced annually with 7.5 GW installed capacity and 18,200 km^{2} of land will be irrigated with the construction of 22 dams and 19 HEPPs.

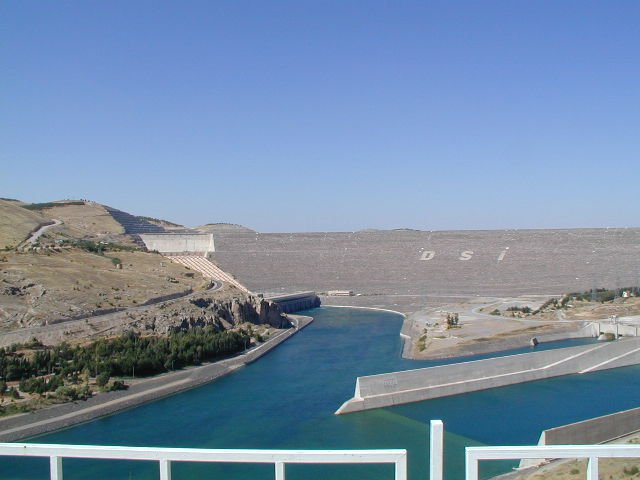
Atatürk Dam

The Atatürk Dam, the largest in Turkey and among the world's largest dams, is the centerpiece of the project.

=== Services ===
State Hydraulic Works is partly responsible for water supply and sanitation in Turkey and is responsible by law for the supply of domestic and industrial water to settlements having population of more than 100,000. As of the 2000 census, there are 55 cities and towns in Turkey with populations over 100,000. State Hydraulic Works supply water to 26 million people in 45 cities at different regions.

As of the beginning of 2005, State Hydraulic Works supplied annually a total of around 2.5 km^{3} domestic water complying with drinking water standards. This figure will reach 5.3 km^{3} with completion of the projects which are under construction, or at the final design and planning stages. Water supply projects developed by State Hydraulic Works meet one third of the requirements for domestic and industrial water consumption.

=== Environment ===
Climate change in Turkey is putting pressure on water resources. The protection of nature and wildlife is of great importance for State Hydraulic Works. It conducts activities on development of sustainable water resources, both independently and in collaboration with other related governmental and non-governmental organizations. State Hydraulic Works also provides financial and technical support to protect archaeological and historical sites for the next generations.

One of the basic duties and responsibilities of State Hydraulic Works is building and operating protective structures against floods. It takes the necessary precautions and warns the relevant organizations in the event of flood emergencies.

State Hydraulic Works conducts afforestation work and establishes recreation areas and facilities aiming at prevention of erosion, decreasing the sediment amount deposited in dams through rivers, restoring the environment of dam basins and their catchments. Tree planted areas also serve as picnic areas and public promenades.

State Hydraulic Works needs to obtain land properties (real estates) for its development projects of water and land resources. Up to now, around 5,200 km^{2} of private land was expropriated. 70,000 families and 350,000 people were relocated by dam projects. It is estimated that 50,000 families and 250,000 people more will be affected in the future.

== Notable executives ==
- Süleyman Demirel, former prime minister and the 9th president of Turkey. Served as director general of DSI between 1955-1960.
- Veysel Eroğlu, current minister of environment and forestry. Served as State Hydraulic Works's director general from 2003 to 2007.
