= Yusufeli Dam =

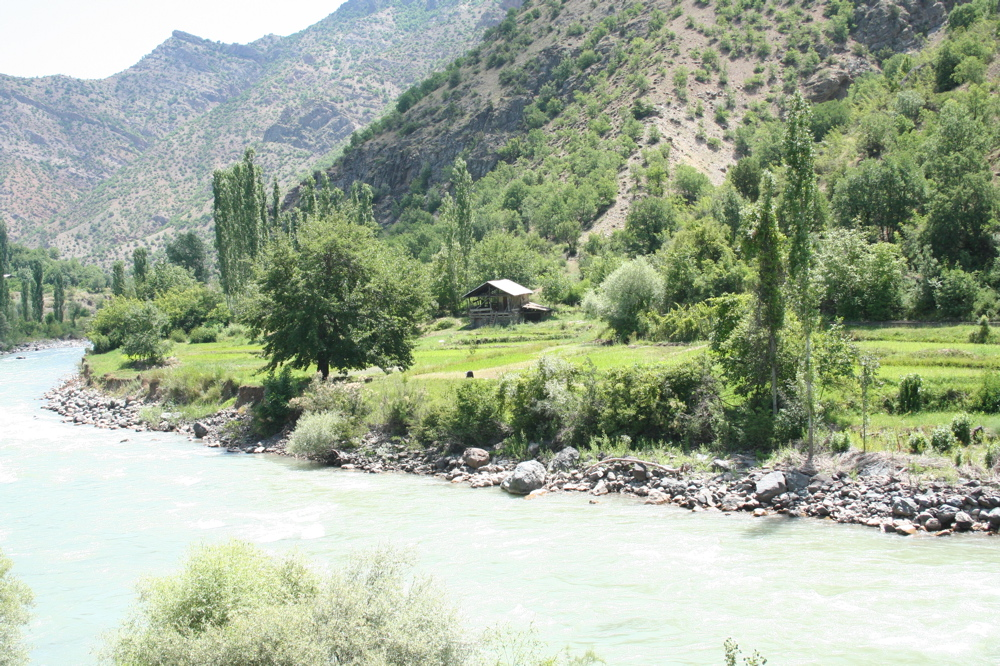

- Location within Turkey
- Official name: Yusufeli Barajı
- Country: Turkey
- Location: Yusufeli, Artvin Province
- Coordinates: 40°49′02″N 41°38′43″E
- Status: Operational
- Construction began: February 26, 2013
- Opening date: 22 Nov 2022
- Construction cost: ₺487 million (approx. US$270 million)
- Owner: State Hydraulic Works

Dam and spillways
- Type of dam: Arch, double-curvature
- Impounds: Çoruh River
- Height: 270 m (886 ft)
- Length: 490 m (1,608 ft)
- Width (crest): 15 m (49 ft)
- Dam volume: 2,900,000 m^{3} (102,412,533 ft^{3})
- Spillway type: Service, controlled chute
- Spillway capacity: 8,000 m^{3}/s (282,517 cu ft/s)

Reservoir
- Creates: Yusufeli Reservoir
- Total capacity: 2,130,000,000 m^{3} (1,726,819 acre⋅ft)
- Surface area: 33.63 km^{2} (13 sq mi)

Power Station
- Turbines: 3 x 180 MW Francis turbines
- Installed capacity: 540 MW
- Annual generation: 1,705 GWh (est.)

The Yusufeli Dam is an arch dam on the Çoruh River near Yusufeli in Artvin Province within the eastern Black Sea region of Turkey. The Yusufeli Dam will be the second largest dam within the larger Çoruh River Development Plan, which plans to build 13 dams, of which two are operational and another two are under construction. The dam's main purpose is hydroelectric power production and it will support a 540 MW power station. The dam is controversial because of its projected impact on the biodiversity within its reservoir area along with the relocation of the locals.

On February 26, 2013, the foundation stone was laid in a ceremony attended by Minister of Forestry and Waterworks Veysel Eroğlu and Minister of Labor and Social Security Faruk Çelik. It is expected that the construction of the dam will cost ₺487 million (approx. US$270 million). The dam's opening date was initially set to May 29, 2018. In 2018, the expected opening date was pushed back to 2021, and the dam finally became operational at the end of 2022. As of 2023, Yusufeli Dam is the highest dam in Turkey and the 9th tallest dam in the world.

== History ==
The first studies on the Yusufeli Dam were carried out in the 1970s and it was included in the Coruh River Hydropower Development Master Plan in 1982. The feasibility report was completed in 1986 and the project was added to the national plan in 1997.

== Design ==
Situated 70 km (43 mi) southwest of Artvin, the Yusufeli will be a double-curvature arch dam with a height of 270 m (886 ft) from its foundation and 223 m (732 ft) from the river's thalweg (lowest point of river bed). It will have a crest length of 490 m (1,608 ft) and crest width of 15 m (49 ft) while being composed of 2,900,000 m^{3} (102,412,533 ft^{3}) of concrete.

The dam's crest will sit at an altitude of 715 m (2,346 ft) above sea level while the normal operating level of its reservoir will be 710 m (2,329 ft), maximum will be 712 m (2,336 ft) and the minimum 670 m (2,198 ft). The reservoir surface area of 33 km^{2} (13 sq mi) will have a total storage capacity of 2,130,000,000 m^{3} (1,726,819 acre⋅ft) and an active or "useful" storage of 1,080,000,000 m^{3} (875,570 acre⋅ft). The dam's spillway will be a service controlled chute type with a maximum discharge capacity of 8,000 m^{3}/s (282,517 cu ft/s).

The dam will have an underground power station that is 110 m (361 ft) long, 21.4 m (70 ft) wide and 45.2 m (148 ft) high. Within the power station will be 3 x 180 MW vertical shaft Francis turbines.

Design activities will be carried out by Su-Yapi Engineering and Consulting Inc.

Construction is to be carried out by a Limak Holding-Cengiz Holding-Kolin consortium.

== Relocation of residents ==
In April 2023, the reservoir behind the dam began filling, thus submerging the town of Yusufeli, population 7,000. The residents were relocated by the government to newly built apartment blocks nearby.

== Projected biological impacts ==
If built, Yusufeli Dam is expected to have significant biological impacts including:

- Adversely affecting 21 nationally listed threatened plant species, (including Iris taochia) of which all except one are endemic to Turkey. Of these threatened species 2 taxa are limited to Yusufeli and its surroundings, 8 are limited to the Çoruh Valley, and 6 to the Artvin-Erzurum area. Turkish Red Book for Plants shows that of these, 7 species are critically endangered, 5 are endangered and 9 are vulnerable.
- Adversely affecting 12 nationally listed threatened mammal species including the; wild goat (Capra aegagrus), chamois (Rupicapra rupicapra), Persian squirrel (Sciurus anomalus), forest dormouse (Dryomys nitedula), brown bear (Ursus arctos), Eurasian badger (Meles meles), gray wolf (Canis lupus), Mediterranean horseshoe bat (Rhinolophus euryale), lesser horseshoe bat (Rhinolophus hipposideros), greater mouse-eared bat (Myotis myotis), Schreibers’ bat (Miniopterus schreibersii) and pipistrelle bat (Pipistrellus pipistrellus). Of these species the Mediterranean bat and wild goat are internationally listed on the IUCN Red List of Threatened Species.
- Adversely affecting 2 nationally threatened fish species, the Black Sea salmon (Salmo trutta labrax) and brown trout (Salmo trutta macrostigma). The Black Sea salmon's migration will be blocked because of this and the other planned and built dams. Existing populations of fish will be adversely affected by the construction of the dam and another 6 species populations may not recover due to the reduction of creek and river habitat needed for breeding.
- Potentially adversely affecting 5 butterfly and 1 dragonfly regionally rare species (Polyommatus poseidon, Pseudophilotes vicrama, Pyrgus cirsii, Scolitantides orion, Thymelicus acteon, and Onychogomphus assimilis) of which 2 (Pyrgus cirsii and Onychogomphus assimilis) are listed in the IUCN Red List.

Nationally rare plants threatened by the Yusufeli Dam
Species	Endemic	Threat level	Distribution in Turkey
Reseda globosa	No	Critically endangered	Coruh Valley
Lathyrus woronowii	Endemic	Critically endangered	Coruh Valley
Ferula mervinii	Endemic	Critically endangered	Yusufeli & its vicinity
Anthemis calcarea var calcarea	Endemic	Critically endangered	Artvin-Erzurum
Anthemis calcarea var discoidea	Endemic	Critically endangered	Artvin-Erzurum
Centaurea straminicephala	Endemic	Critically endangered	Coruh Valley
Centaurea leptophylla	Endemic	Critically endangered	Yusufeli & its vicinity
Clypeola raddeana	Endemic	Endangered	Coruh Valley
Morina persica var decussatifolia	Endemic	Endangered	Artvin-Erzurum
Campanula troegeraeƒ	Endemic	Endangered	Artvin-Erzurum
Verbascum gracilescens	Endemic	Endangered	Coruh Valley
Asperula virgata	Endemic	Endangered	Coruh Valley
Acer divergens var divergens	Endemic	Vulnerable	Coruh Valley
Sempervivum staintonii	Endemic	Vulnerable	Coruh Valley
Seseli andronakii	Endemic	Vulnerable	Artvin-Erzurum
Bupleurum brachiatum	Endemic	Vulnerable	Middle & East Blacksea
Bupleurum schistosum	Endemic	Vulnerable	Coruh Valley
Centaurea pecho	Endemic	Vulnerable	East Blacksea
Centaurea hedgei	Endemic	Vulnerable	Artvin-Erzurum
Linaria genistifolia subsp artivinensis	Endemic	Vulnerable	Coruh Valley
Iris taochia	Endemic	Vulnerable	East Blacksea

== See also ==
- Arkun Dam – upstream
- Artvin Dam – downstream
