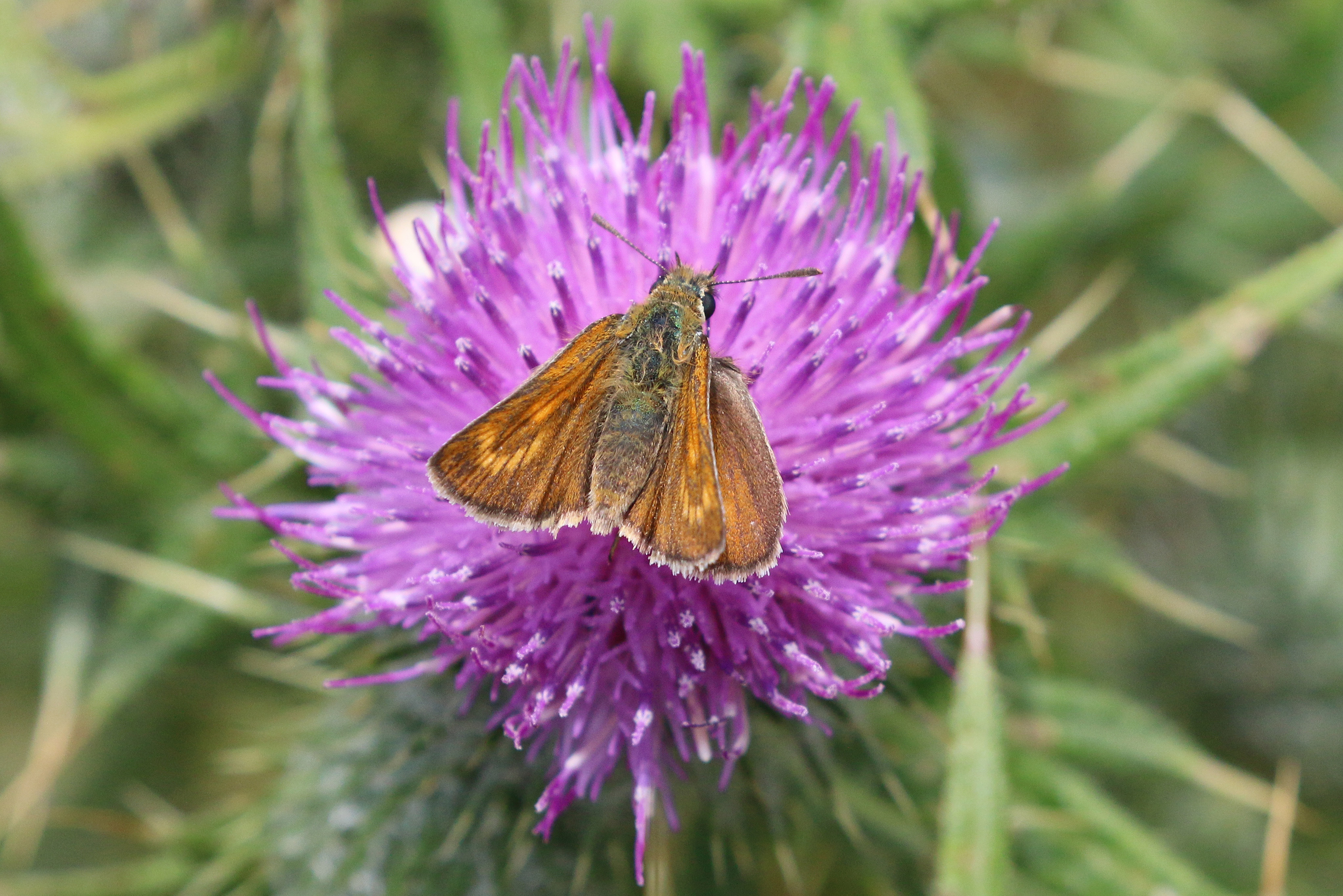

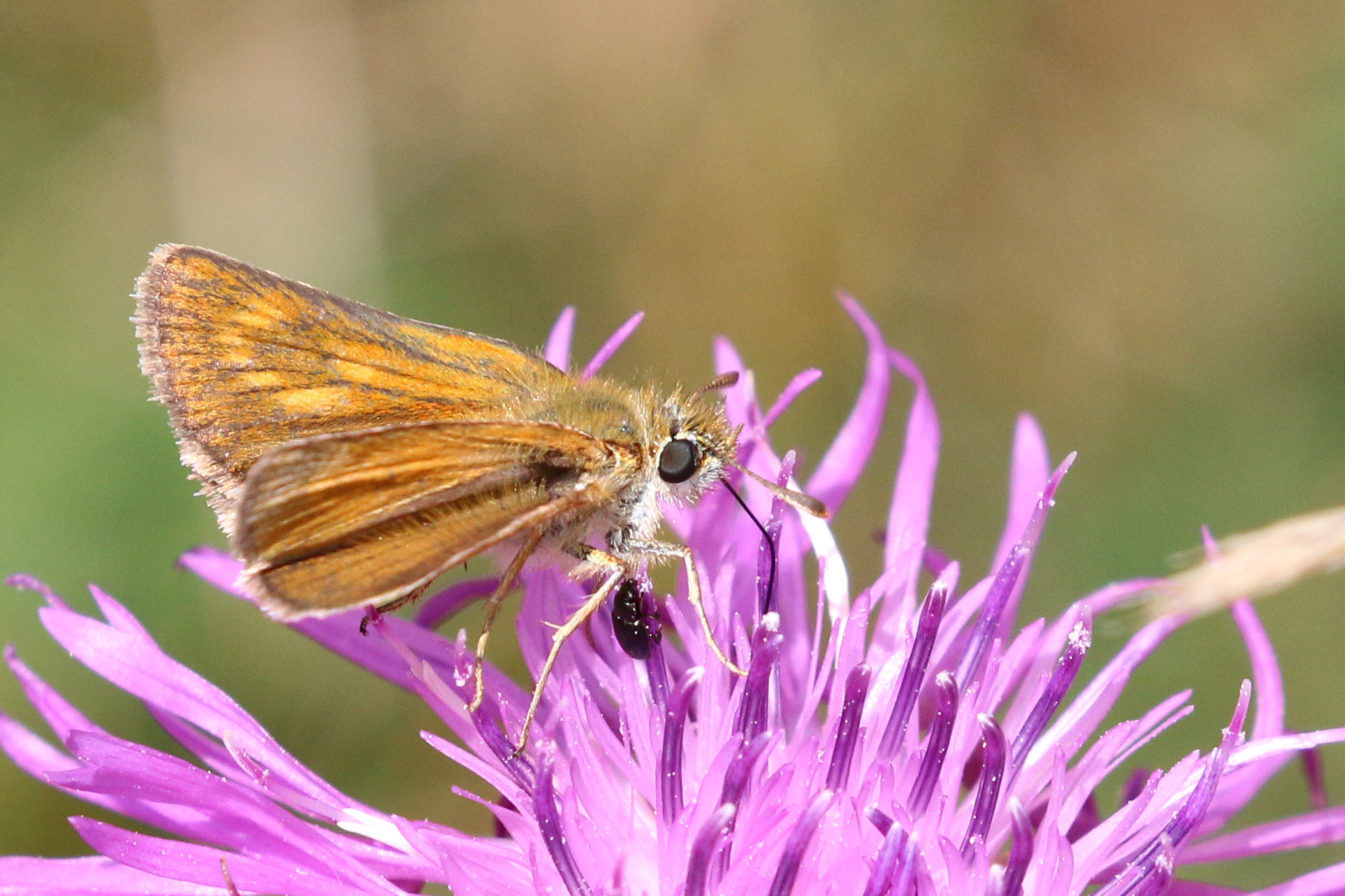
- Both females Lulworth Cove, Dorset

Conservation status
- Vulnerable (NatureServe)

Scientific classification
- Domain: Eukaryota
- Kingdom: Animalia
- Phylum: Arthropoda
- Class: Insecta
- Order: Lepidoptera
- Family: Hesperiidae
- Genus: Thymelicus
- Species: T. acteon

Binomial name
- Thymelicus acteon (Rottemburg, 1775)
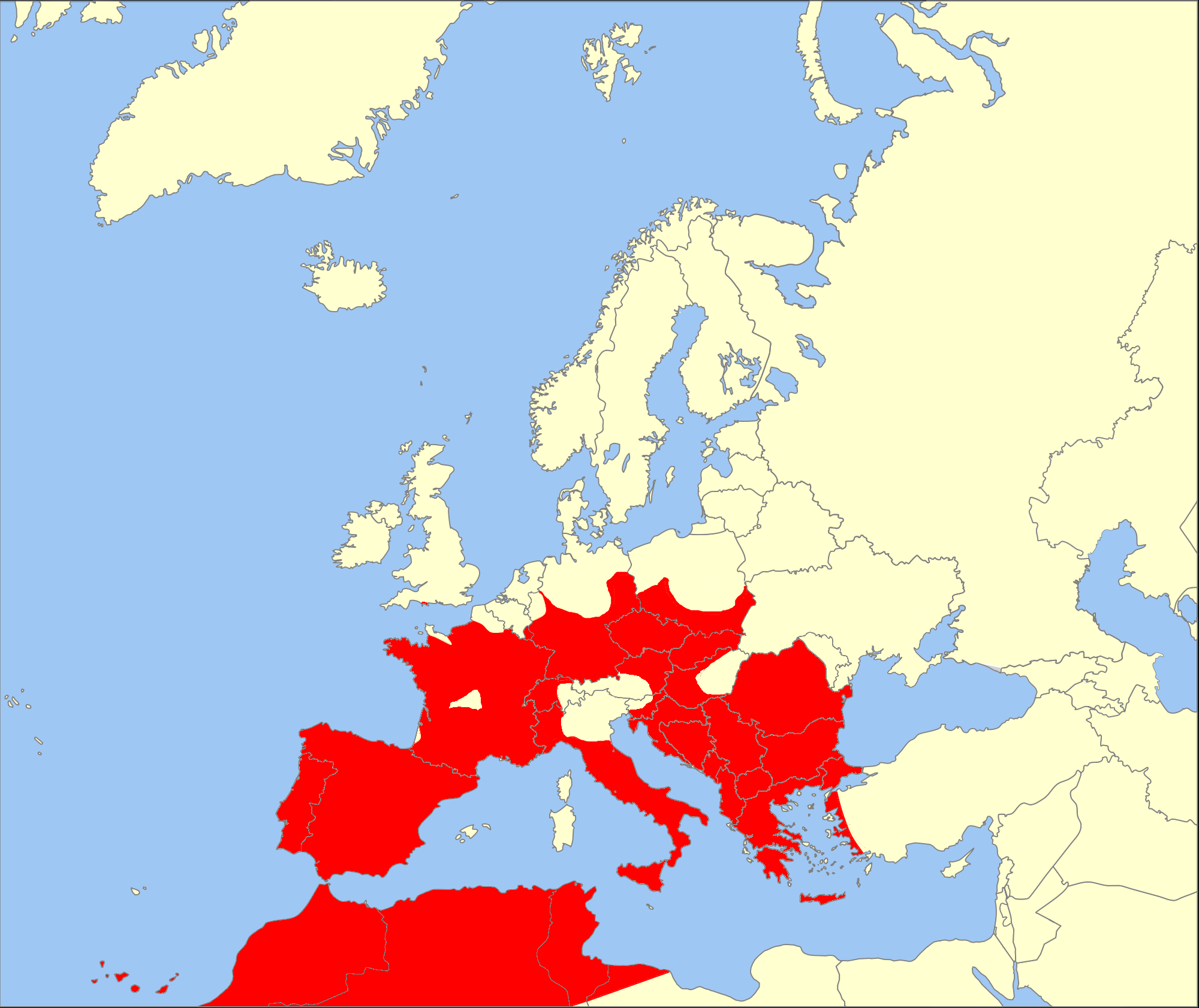
- Occurs locally in Central & Northern Europe, Asia Minor and North Africa

= Lulworth skipper =

Species of butterfly

The Lulworth skipper (Thymelicus acteon) is a butterfly of the family Hesperiidae. Its name is derived from Lulworth Cove in the county of Dorset, England, where the first specimens in Great Britain were collected in 1832 by English naturalist James Charles Dale.

The species occurs locally across Central Europe, Asia Minor and North Africa, where its population is considered stable. Its numbers have declined in Northern Europe, leading to its European status of "vulnerable". Its range in Britain is restricted to the south coast of Dorset, however it is locally abundant and its numbers currently are perhaps at their greatest since its discovery there.

With a wingspan of 24 to 28 millimetres, females being larger than males, the Lulworth skipper is a small butterfly, the smallest member of the genus Thymelicus in Europe and among the smallest butterflies in Britain. Aside from the size difference, the sexes are distinguished by females having a distinct circle of golden marks on each forewing. Due to their likeness to the rays around the eye of a peacock's feather, these are often known as "sun-ray" markings, and they can faintly appear on males.

== Taxonomy ==
The Lulworth skipper was first described by German entomologist S. A. von Rottemburg in 1775. The butterfly was first discovered in Britain on 15 August 1832, when specimens were taken from Lulworth Cove in Dorset by English naturalist James Charles Dale. It was introduced the following year as the Lulworth skipper (Thymelicus acteon), a name that has remained unchanged; it is the only one of Britain's vernacular butterfly names for which there has never been a proposed substitute.

== Description ==
The male Lulworth skipper has a wingspan of 24 to 27 millimetres (0.94 to 1.06 in), and the female 25 to 28 mm. This makes it one of Britain's smallest butterflies and, in Europe, the smallest member of the Thymelicus genus. Of Britain's five "golden" skippers—the others being the silver-spotted skipper (Hesperia comma), large skipper (Ochlodes sylvanus), small skipper (Thymelicus sylvestris) and Essex skipper (Thymelicus lineola)—the Lulworth is both the smallest and darkest. Beyond its small size, it is distinguished particularly by its dark, dun-coloured wings that appear with tinges of olive-brown; this darkening especially apparent in males.

Variations are known to occur; in north-west Africa, the uppersides of the forewing and hindwing are darker, with hints of greenish or greyish brown. Similarly-coloured races occur in Spain, Elba, Crete, and other eastern Mediterranean islands. T. acteon christi, endemic to the Canary Islands, displays colour variations, with the uppersides of the forewing showing defined yellow–orange markings.

The butterfly is sexually dimorphic; females have a distinct circle of golden marks on each forewing, often called "sun-ray" markings due to their likeness to the rays around the eye of a peacock's feather. Males sometimes have these markings, though they are noticeably fainter (see Illustration 1).

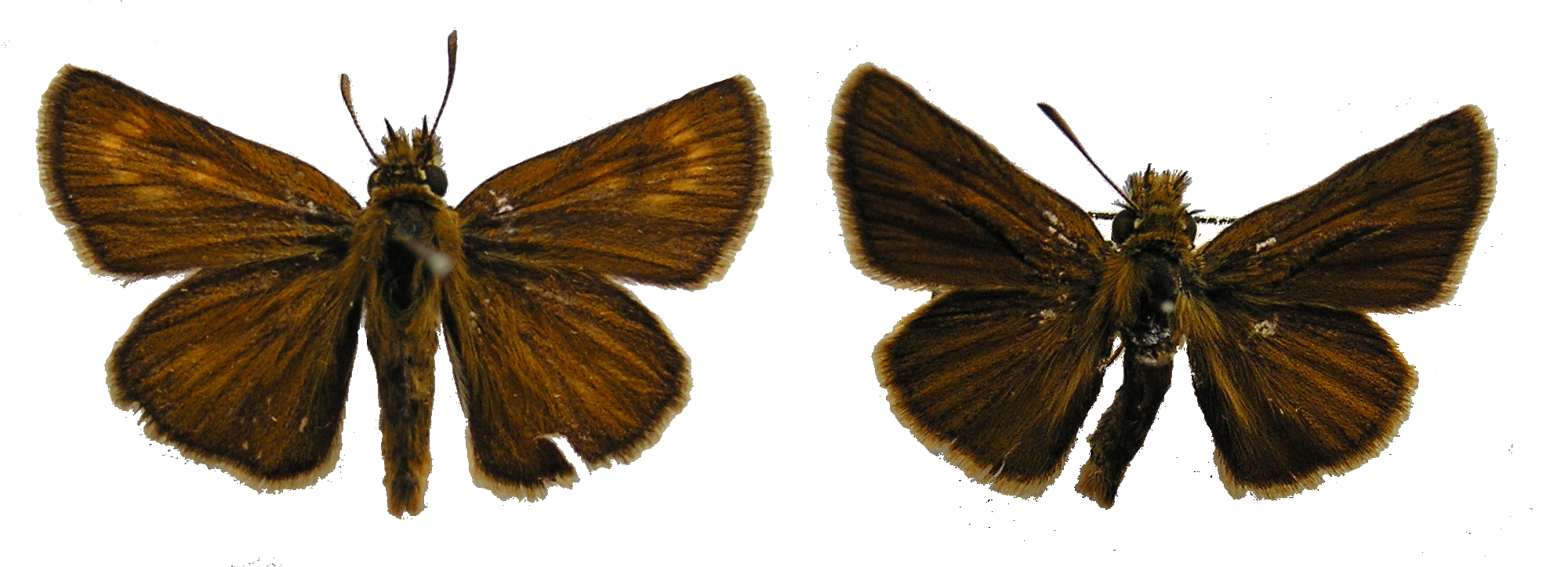
Illustration 1: Female (left) and Male (right) Lulworth skipper specimens

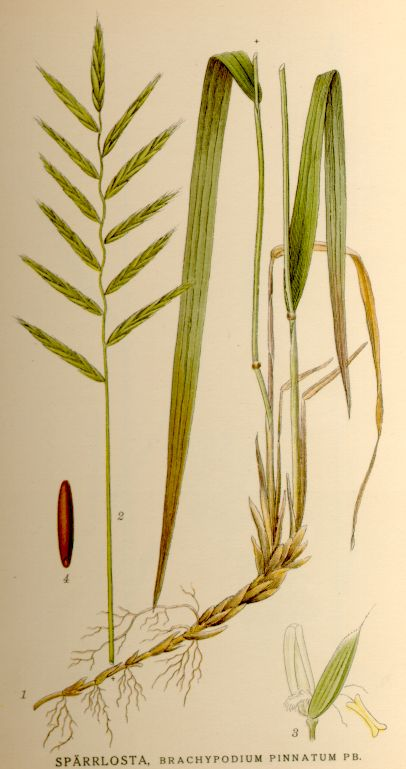
Illustration 2: Tor-grass is the sole food plant of the Lulworth skipper, and plays an important role in its life cycle

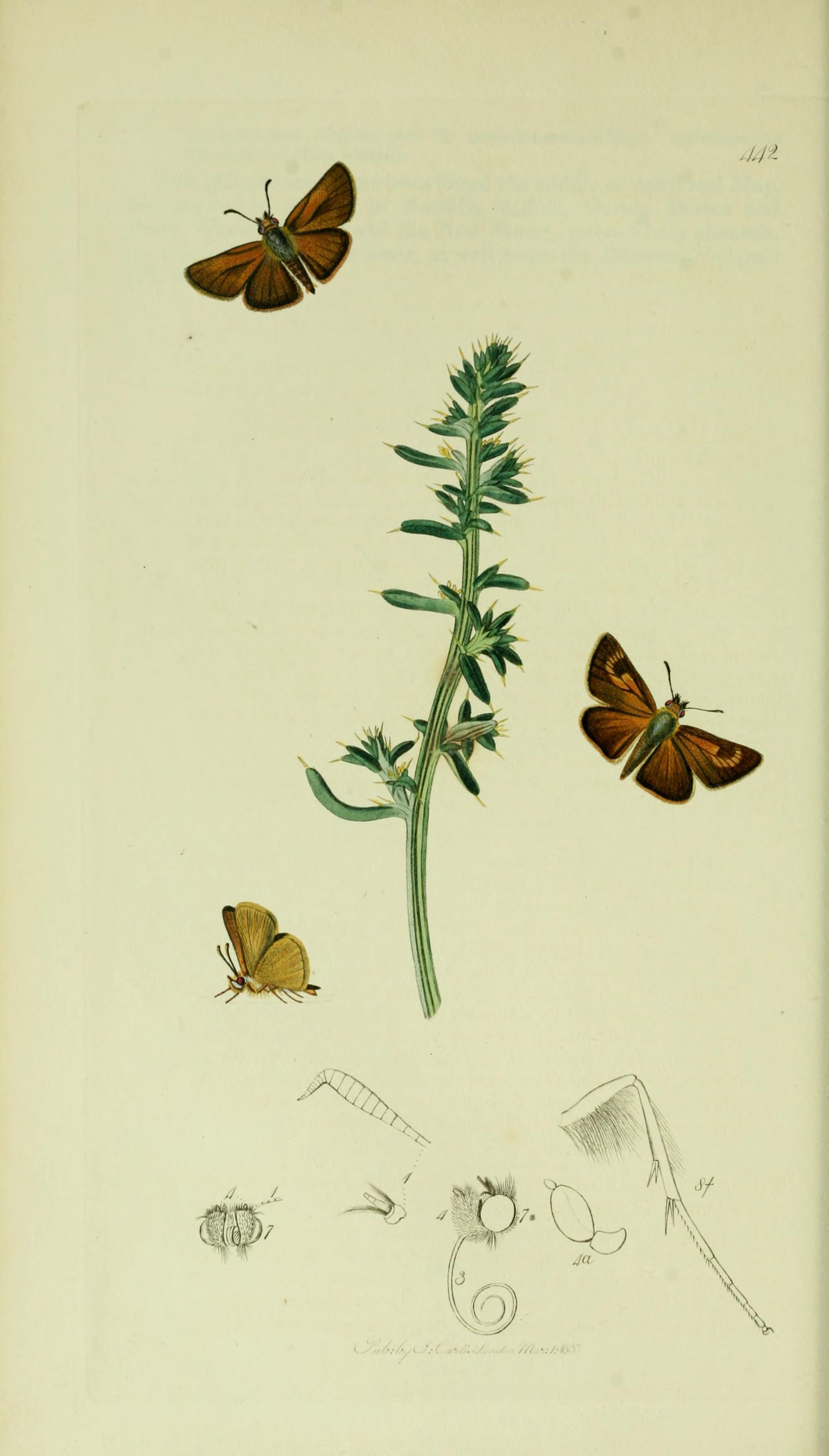
Illustration from John Curtis's British Entomology Vol. 5

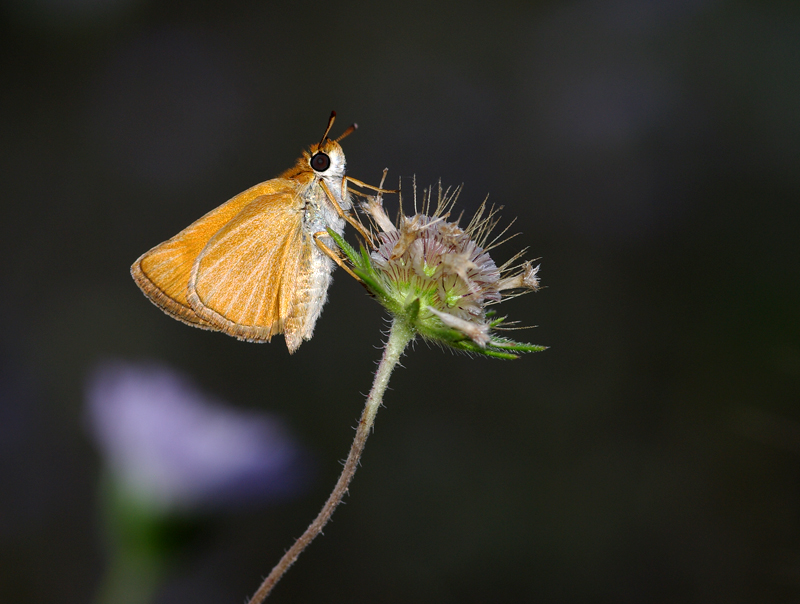
underside

== Distribution and habitat ==
The Lulworth skipper is found locally across southern and central Europe, Asia Minor and North Africa, where its population is considered stable. In northern Europe, its numbers and range have severely declined, most notably in the Netherlands where it is now extinct. This decline has led to the butterfly's European status of "vulnerable". Isolated populations of the species in Armenia are also threatened, although not yet included in the National Red List. It is also listed as threatened under the United Kingdom Biodiversity Action Plan.

In Great Britain, where the butterfly reaches the northern limit of its range, its distribution is restricted to the southern coastline of the county of Dorset. Here, both the population and range have changed little in recent decades; it is locally abundant, with the majority of colonies found on the coast between Weymouth and Swanage and on the Purbeck Ridge, a line of inland chalk hills. Two outlying colonies also exist, at Burton Bradstock and on the Isle of Portland; the cause of the colony on Portland is unknown, but has been put down to either natural colonisation or released specimens.^{[b]} There is evidence to suggest that the Lulworth skipper is now more abundant in Dorset than at any other time since its discovery in 1832.

Although colonies of Lulworth skippers existed in Devon, the species has, beyond single records, not be seen in the county since the 1930s. Similarly, records of occurrences exist for Cornwall, but they have not been verified as native colonies.

Habitats are primarily on unfertilised calcareous grassland; this includes chalk download, coastal grassland and undercliffs in Britain. In all of these habits Tor-grass (Illustration 2), the butterfly's sole food plant and that on which it lays eggs, is widespread. Tall, ungrazed grass is a favoured habitat due to oviposition and larval development; Lulworth skippers have benefited from the move away from tight grazing by sheep in the last century and recently outbreaks of myxomatosis among rabbit populations, which otherwise maintain a lower grass height. However, there is evidence to suggest that minimal grazing is not detrimental to the species, and may in fact be beneficial in that it encourages the growth of flowers that act as adult nectar sources.

== Behaviour ==
=== Life cycle ===
The females lay their eggs in rows of 5 to 6 (although as many as 15 have been recorded) on the flower-sheath of Tor-grass (Brachypodium pinnatum), preferring the dead sheaths of tall plants. The care taken by females over where to lay their eggs is considered the only remarkable part of the Lulworth skipper breeding process, otherwise it is considered common.

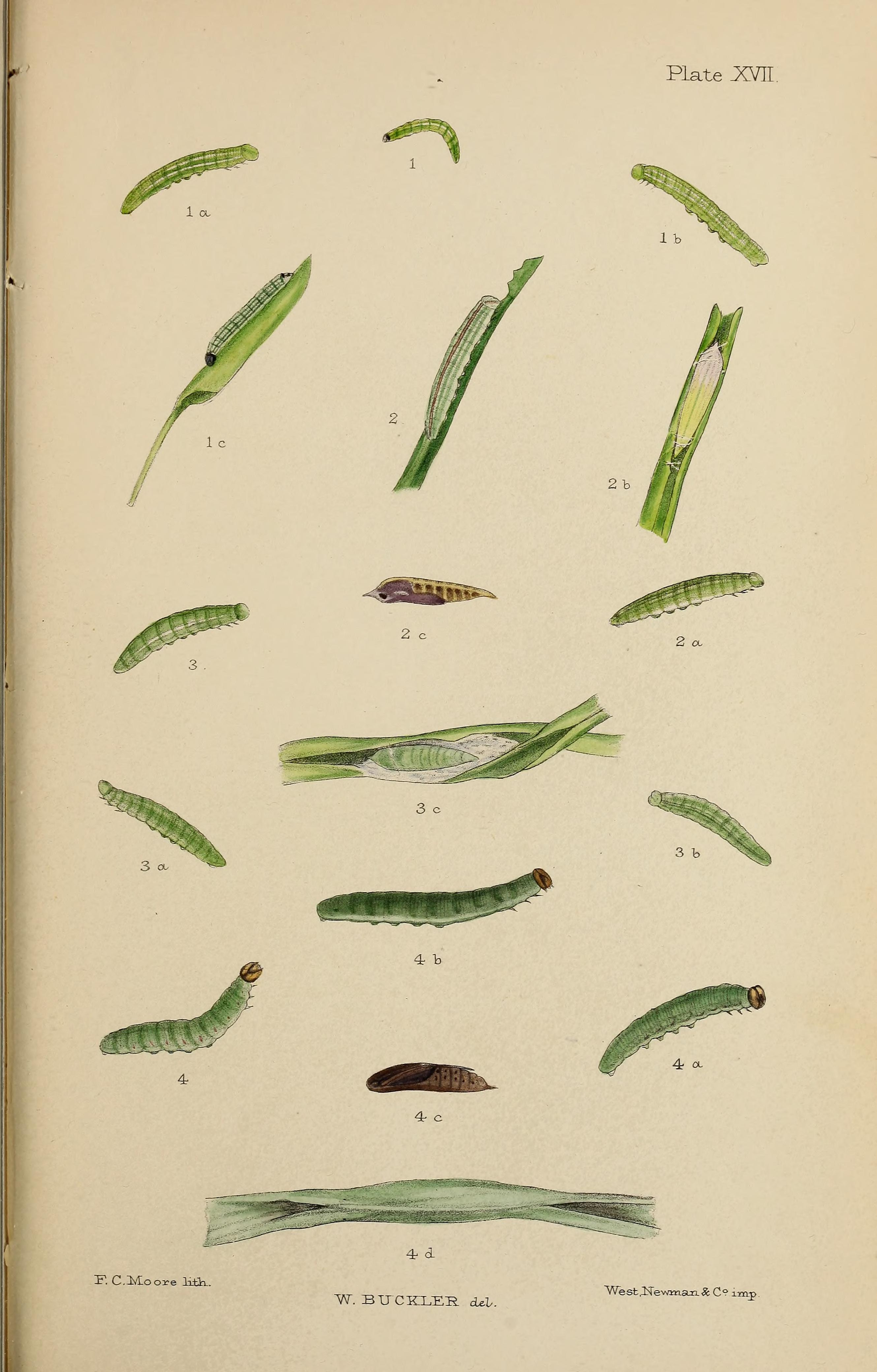
Figs 2, 2a larvae after last moult 2b, 2c pupa

Upon hatching, the 2.5 cm (1 in) long larva spins a compact cocoon on the site of the eggshell. In this, it will overwinter until around the third week of April, at which point it will eat its way out by making a small hole in the side of the sheath. The caterpillar will then search for tender Tor-grass blades and feed upon them by chewing out notches from the margin. During this time, it will live separately, within a tube composed of the two edges of a blade bound by cords of silk. Fresh tubes will be made as the caterpillar grows larger. Lulworth skipper caterpillars live in the warmest zone of a grass clump, at a height of 20 to 40 centimetres (8 to 16 in).

The pupal stage lasts for about two weeks, from the beginning of June onwards, until late July. It is formed inside a loose "nest" of silk and grass that is spun deep inside a tussock of tor grass. Imago begin to emerge in the early middle of July and finish emerging in the middle of September. Typically, they will live for five to ten days—the normal lifespan for a non-hibernating butterfly of the Lulworth's seasonal stage. They fly only in strong sunshine and tend to form discrete colonies, with the largest containing up to 100,000 individuals.

A graph illustrating the life cycle of the Lulworth skipper in Great Britain; in other parts of the world, the life cycle varies, with adults usually emerging earlier in the season.

== See also ==
- List of butterflies of Great Britain

== Notes and references ==
=== Notes ===
1. Lulworth skipper adults rarely stray from their favoured breeding areas and are considered poor migrants. This is demonstrated by other regions of Britain, containing tor-grass in abundance, where there are no recorded colonies. Any migration to and natural colonisation of Portland would have meant travel across open water, casting further doubt upon the idea. Dispersal must occur, however, as sites such as restored grassland at Durlston and the area between Burton Bradstock and Weymouth have been colonised.
