= Artvin Dam =

- Location within Turkey
- Country: Turkey
- Location: Artvin
- Coordinates: 40°56′01.8″N 41°46′11.10″E
- Purpose: Power
- Status: Operational
- Construction began: 2010
- Opening date: 2016
- Owner: State Hydraulic Works

Dam and spillways
- Type of dam: Arch-gravity
- Impounds: Çoruh River
- Height (foundation): 180 m (591 ft)
- Height (thalweg): 135 m (443 ft)
- Length: 277.90 m (912 ft)
- Elevation at crest: 515 m (1,690 ft)
- Dam volume: 950,000 m^{3} (1,242,553 cu yd)
- Spillway type: Uncontrolled overflow
- Spillway capacity: 8,200 m^{3}/s (289,580 cu ft/s)

Reservoir
- Total capacity: 167,000,000 m^{3} (135,389 acre⋅ft)
- Catchment area: 15,540 km^{2} (6,000 mi^{2})
- Surface area: 4.1 km^{2} (2 mi^{2})

Power Station
- Commission date: 2016
- Hydraulic head: 116 m (381 ft) (gross)
- Turbines: 2 x 170 MW Francis-type
- Installed capacity: 340 MW
- Annual generation: 1026 GWh (estimate)

The Artvin Dam is an arch-gravity dam on the Çoruh River in Artvin Province, Turkey. Preliminary construction on the dam began in December 2010 and the river diversion tunnels were complete in July 2012 at which time construction on the dam foundation started. The purpose of the dam is hydroelectric power generation and its power station has an installed capacity of 340 MW when completed. The dam is part of the Çoruh Development Plan and its construction was supervised by Turkey's State Hydraulic Works. The dam began to impound its reservoir in October 2015 and the power station was commissioned beginning in January 2016.

== See also ==
- Yusufeli Dam – under construction upstream
- Deriner Dam – downstream
