= Çoruh =

River in Turkey and Georgia

Çoruh Chorokh, Ch'orokhi, Acampsis
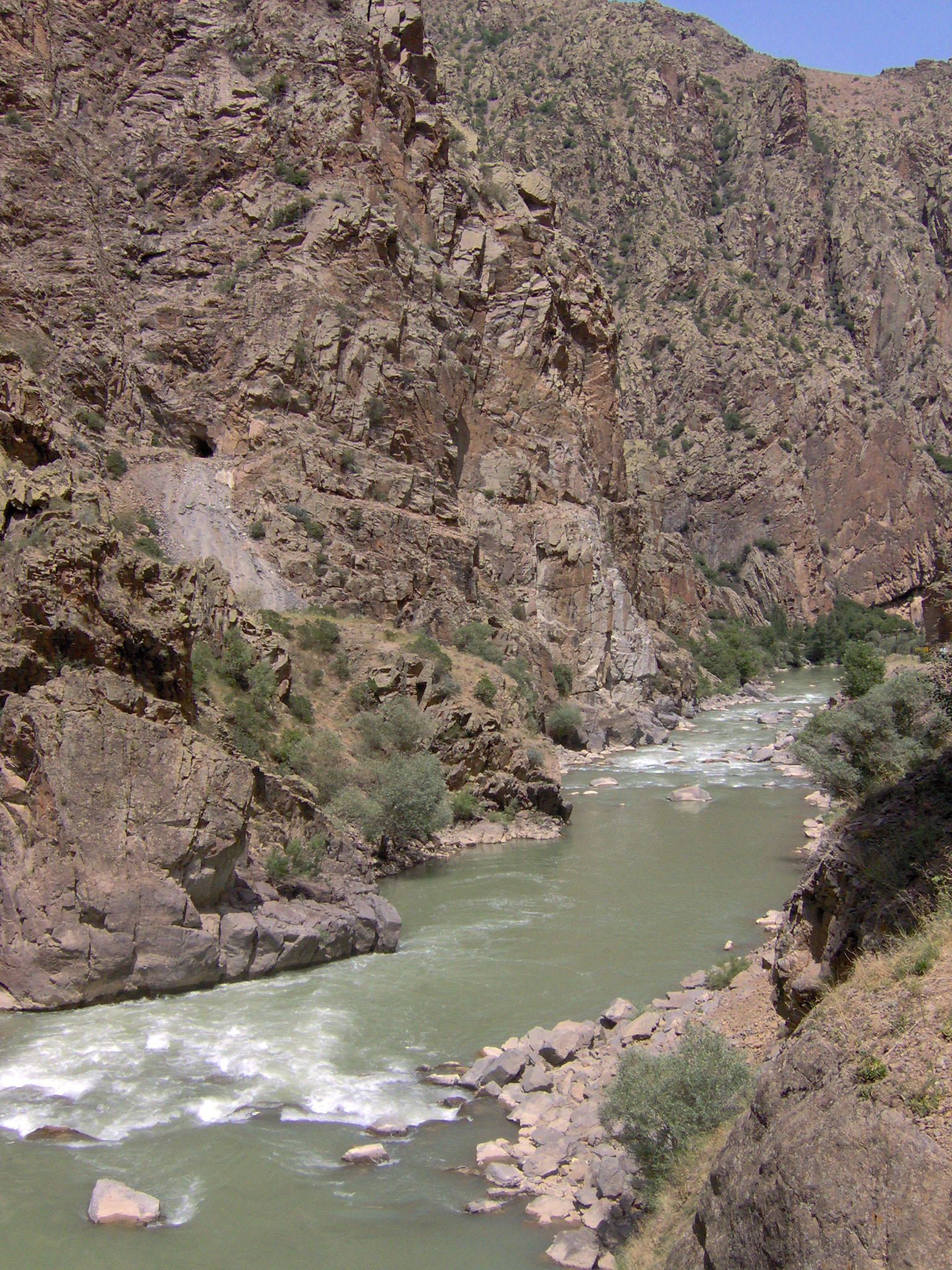

Location
- Countries: Turkey and Georgia

Physical characteristics
- Source
  - location: Mescit Mountains
- Mouth: Black Sea
  - coordinates: 41.6047°N 41.5742°E
- Length: 438 km (272 mi)
- Basin size: 22,100 km^{2} (8,500 sq mi)
- Discharge
  - average: 278 m^{3}/s (9,800 cu ft/s)

Basin features
- Tributaries
  - left: Barhal, Balakor
  - right: Oltu, Berta, Machakhelistsqali, Acharistsqali

The Chorokh (Turkish: Çoruh) (Georgian: ჭოროხი Ch'orokhi [t͡ʃʼo̞ɾo̞χi] is a river that rises in the Mescit Mountains in north-eastern Turkey, flows through the cities of Bayburt, İspir, Yusufeli, and Artvin, along the Kelkit-Çoruh Fault, before flowing into Georgia, where it reaches the Black Sea just south of Batumi and a few kilometers north of the Turkey-Georgia border.

In Arrian's Periplus Ponti Euxini, it is called the Acampsis (Greek: Άκαμψις); Pliny may have confused it with the Bathys. Procopius writes that it was called Acampsis because it was impossible to force a way through it after it has entered the sea, since it discharges its stream with such force and swiftness, causing a great disturbance of the water before it, that it goes out for a very great distance into the sea and makes it impossible to coast along at that point.

In English, it was formerly known as the Boas, the Churuk, or the Chorokh.

== Biodiversity ==
The Ch'orokhi valley lies within the Caucasus ecological zone, which is considered by the World Wide Fund for Nature and by Conservation International as a biodiversity hotspot. The Çoruh Valley is recognised by Turkish conservation organisations as an important plant area, an important bird area, a key biodiversity area and has been nominated as a high priority area for protection. This valley is rich in plants and contains 104 nationally threatened plant species of which 67 are endemic to Turkey.

== Recreation ==
The Çoruh has been called "an eco-tourism gem" and "Turkey's last remaining wild river", and is being promoted for whitewater kayaking by the Eastern Anatolia Tourism Development Project. It attracts kayakers and rafters from all over the world and was the site of the 4th World Rafting Championship in 1993 and the Coruh Extreme kayak competition in 2005.

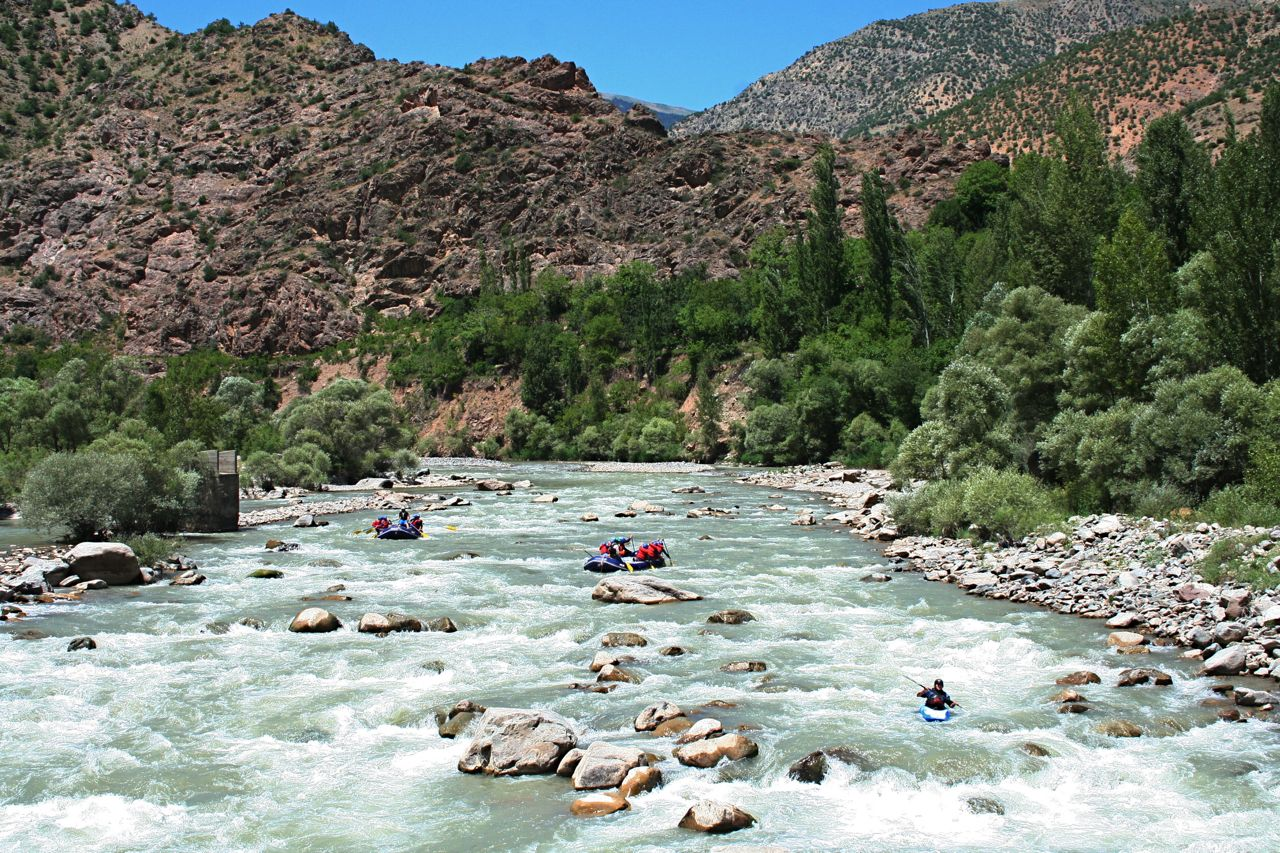

== Dams ==
A total of 17 large hydroelectric dams are planned as part of the Çoruh River Development Plan but a total of 27 are proposed for the Çoruh River Catchment. Under the Çoruh Development Plan, 8 dams have been completed (Arkun, Artvin, Borçka, Deriner, Güllübağ, Murtli, Tortum and Yusufeli Dams), another 2 are under construction.

Dam	Phase
Tortum Dam	Operational – Tortum River (Çoruh tributary)
Muratli Dam	Operational
Borçka Dam	Operational
Deriner Dam	Operational
Olur Dam	Planned
Bağlık Dam	Planned – Berta River (Çoruh tributary)
Bayram Dam	Planned – Berta River (Çoruh tributary)
Artvin Dam	Operational
Yusufeli Dam	Operational
Altiparmak Dam	Planned – Barhal River (Çoruh tributary)
Ayvali Dam	Planned – Oltu River (Çoruh tributary)
Olur Dam	Planned – Oltu River (Çoruh tributary)
Arkun Dam	Operational
Aksu Dam	Preliminary construction
Güllübağ Dam	Operational
İspir Dam	Planned
Laleli Dam	Under construction

== See also ==
- "The Yusufeli dam project". Rivernet.
- "Biological Assessment Yusufeli Dam & Hydro-Electricity Power Project's Environmental Impact Assessment" (PDF). ECA Watch. Archived from the original (PDF) on Feb 7, 2012.
- Friends of the Earth
