= Borçka Dam =

Dam in Borçka, Artvin, Turkey

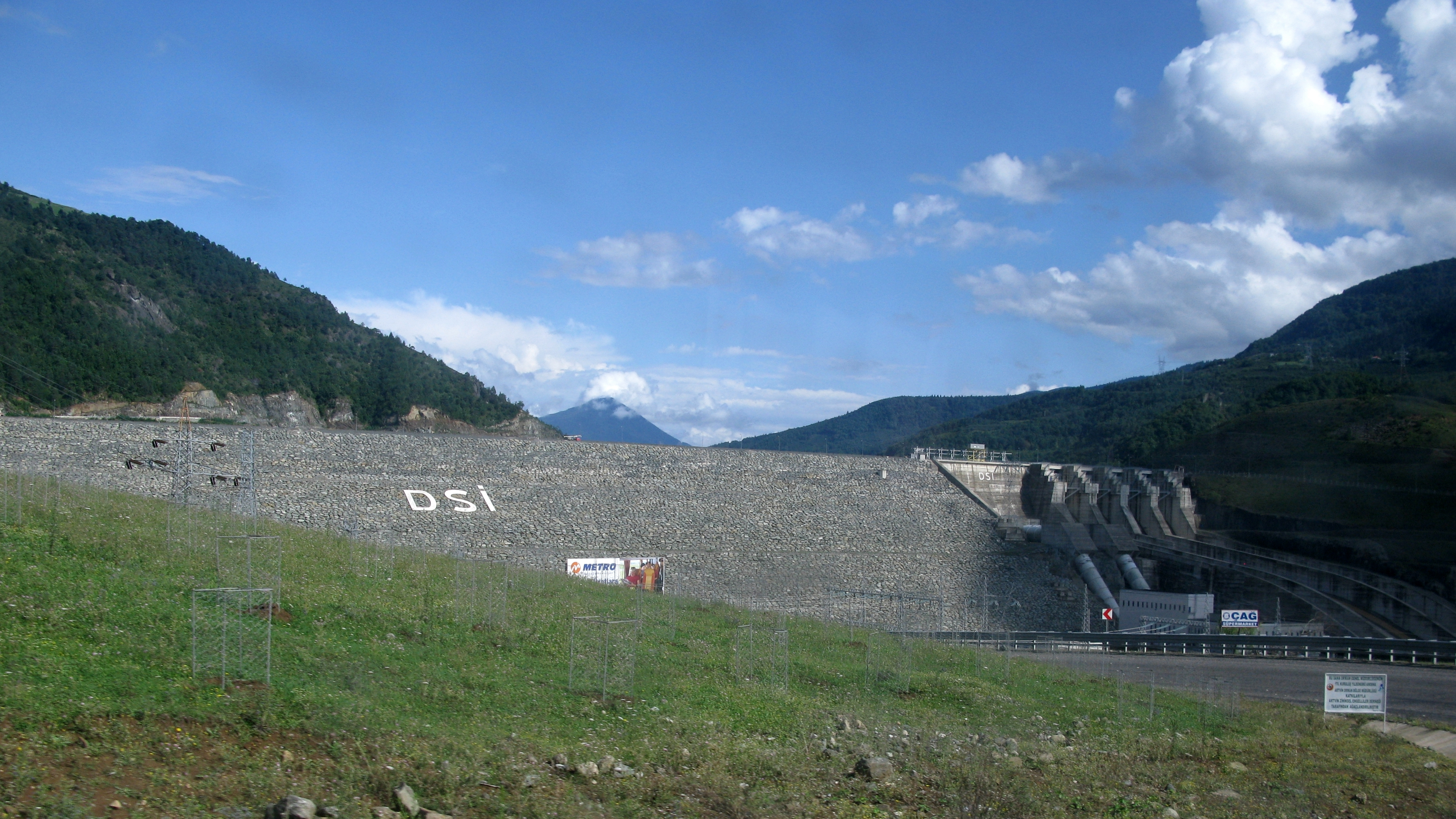

- Location within Turkey
- Official name: Borçka Barajı
- Location: Borçka, Artvin Province, Turkey
- Coordinates: 41°20′59″N 41°41′16″E
- Construction began: 1999
- Opening date: 2006

Dam and spillways
- Impounds: Çoruh River
- Height: 86 m (282 ft)

Reservoir
- Total capacity: 419 hm^{3} (340,000 acre⋅ft)
- Surface area: 11 km^{2} (4.2 sq mi)

Power Station
- Installed capacity: 300 MW
- Annual generation: 1,039 GWh
- Website www.dsi.gov.tr

Borçka Dam (Turkish: Borçka Barajı) is a dam on the Çoruh River 1.5 km (0.93 mi) south-east of Borçka (on the border with Georgia.) in Artvin Province, Turkey. It was built between 1999 and 2006.

== See also ==
- Muratlı Dam – downstream
- Deriner Dam – upstream
- List of dams and reservoirs in Turkey
