= Deriner Dam =

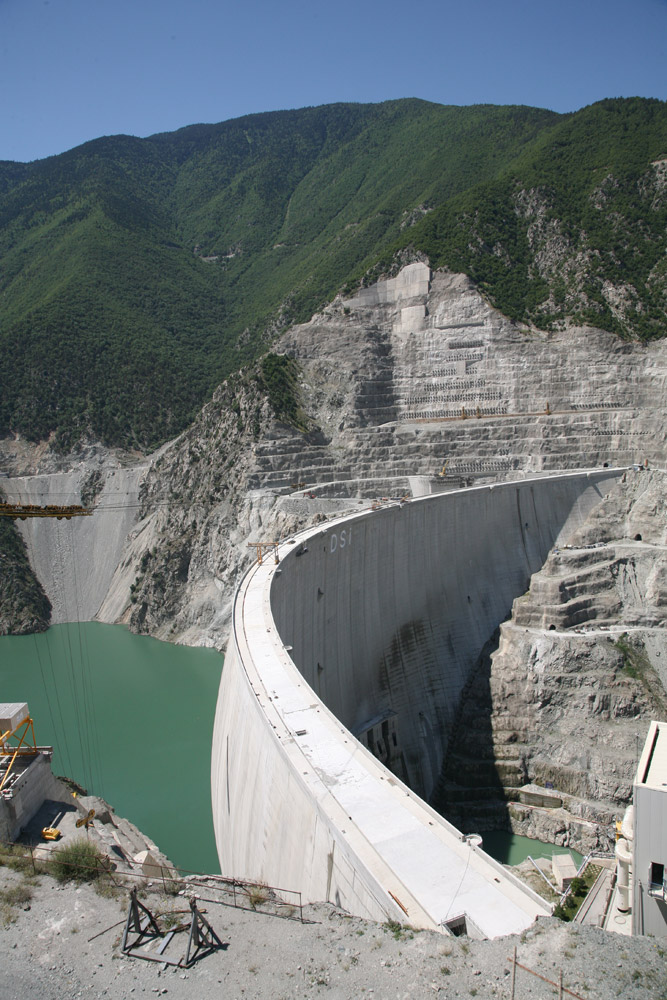

- Location within Turkey
- Official name: Deriner Barajı
- Location: Artvin, Artvin Province, Turkey
- Coordinates: 41°10′11″N 41°52′13″E
- Construction began: 1998
- Opening date: 2012
- Construction cost: ~2 billion USD
- Owner: Turkish State Hydraulic Works

Dam and spillways
- Type of dam: Concrete double curvature arch
- Impounds: Coruh River
- Height: 249 m (817 ft)
- Length: 720 m (2,360 ft)
- Width (base): 60 m (200 ft)
- Dam volume: 3,400,000 m^{3} (4,400,000 cu yd)
- Spillway type: Over-flow, gate-controlled tunnel x 2 Orifice, gate-controlled x 8
- Spillway capacity: Over-flow: 2,250 m^{3}/s (79,000 cu ft/s); Orifice:7,000 m^{3}/s (250,000 cu ft/s)

Reservoir
- Creates: Deriner Reservoir
- Total capacity: 1,970,000,000 m^{3} (1,600,000 acre⋅ft)
- Catchment area: 18,389 km^{2} (7,100 sq mi)
- Surface area: 26.4 km^{2} (10.2 sq mi)

Power Station
- Commission date: February 2013
- Type: Conventional
- Turbines: 4 x 167.5 MW Francis-type
- Installed capacity: 670 MW
- Annual generation: 2118 GWh

Deriner Dam (Turkish: Deriner Barajı) is a concrete double-curved arch dam on the Çoruh River 5 km (3.1 mi) east of Artvin in Artvin Province, Turkey. The main purpose of the dam is hydroelectric power production and additionally flood control. Construction on the dam began in 1998, the reservoir began to fill in February 2012 and the power station was completed by February 2013. It has a 670 MW powerhouse and is the tallest dam in Turkey. The dam is being implemented by Turkey's State Hydraulic Works and constructed by a consortium of Turkish, Russian and Swiss companies.

The dam is named after İbrahim Deriner, who died while the Chief Engineer of its research team.

== Background ==
In 1969, a survey of the energy potential of the Coruh River was carried out by the Electrical Power Resources Survey Administration and later potential dam foundations were investigated. Based on the studies and investigations, a master plan for the river was started in 1979 and completed in 1982. The feasibility study for the Deriner Dam was not completed until 1987 and was carried out by the Swiss branch of Poyry Energy and Turkey's Dolsar Engineering. Several factors delayed construction of the dam during this period. The cost of relocating roads in such a mountainous area would be high and the need for agricultural, not electric development was deemed a higher priority. As the demand for electricity in Turkey grew, the Çoruh Valley Project began its implementation. After negotiations and the signing of a protocol between the Turkish and Russian governments at the 1994 Turkish-Russian Mixed Economic Commission in Moscow, Turkey's State Hydraulic Works was authorized to move forward with the dam. The consortium started with the Russian company Technostroyexport and later expanded with Turkey's ERG Construction and the Swiss companies Stucky (engineering consulting), Andritz (turbines and hydromechanical works) and Alstom (generators, energy transmission and balance-of-plant). The environmental impact assessment report for the dam was completed and approved in 1995 and funding to begin the project was available in 1997. In 1998, the consortium received the site and construction commenced.

== Construction ==
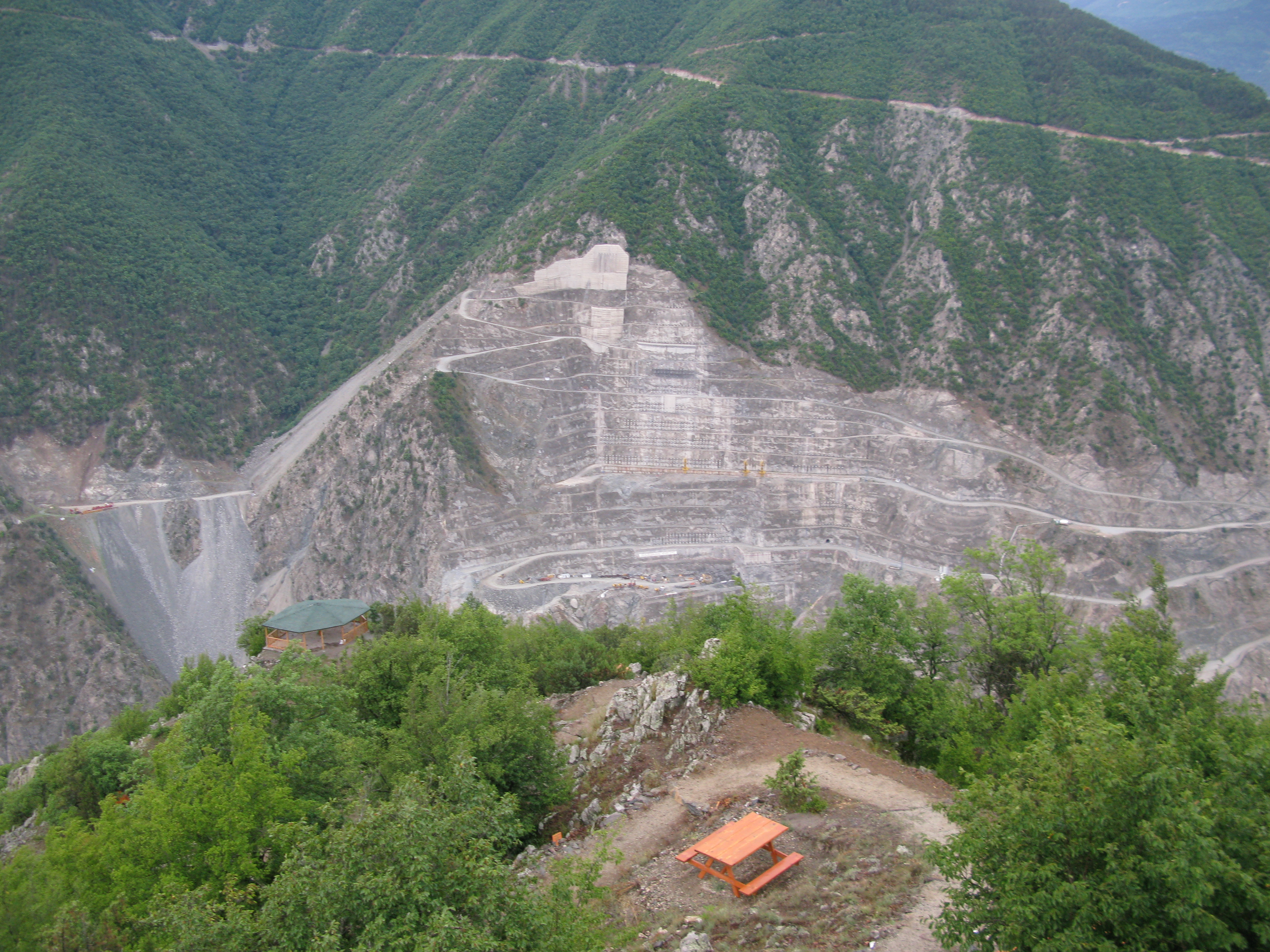
The dam under construction in 2009

Construction on the Deriner Dam began in January 1998, and by the end of 2005, the Coruh River had been diverted around the construction site and the dam's foundation was excavated and prepared. The river was diverted on the right bank by means of a 937 m (3,074 ft) horseshoe-shaped tunnel with an 11.7 m (38 ft) diameter. The foundation required extensive excavation because layers of decompressed rock existed above the sound granodiorite rock. To secure the foundation, over 2,000 re-stressable post-tensioned rock anchors were installed. At the end of 2005, workers began pouring concrete for the dam's foundation but because of funding, this was delayed between September 2006 and September 2007. By January 2008, the dam reached a height of 66 m (217 ft). By mid-2010, 2,300,000 m^{3} (3,000,000 cu yd) of the needed 3,400,000 m^{3} (4,400,000 cu yd) of concrete had been poured and 93% of the project was complete. The spillways within the dam's body were complete as well. On 24 February 2012, the dam was complete and began to impound its reservoir. The power station is expected to be operational by February 2013.

== Specifications ==
=== Dam ===
The Deriner Dam is a 249 m (817 ft) high, 720 m (2,360 ft) long double-curved arch dam. It has a base width of 60 m (200 ft) and a crest width at the top cantilever of 1 m (3.3 ft). A total of 3,400,000 m^{3} (4,400,000 cu yd) of concrete forms the dam's body which also contains its orifice spillway. This spillway consists of 8 2.8 m (9.2 ft) x 5.6 m (18 ft) flap gates that can discharge a maximum of 7,000 m^{3}/s (250,000 cu ft/s) of water. The dam's other spillway consists of two tunnels, each on opposing banks behind the dam. The right tunnel is 459 m (1,506 ft) long and the left is 472 m (1,549 ft) long. Each tunnel is controlled by a 6.5 m (21 ft) high, 24 m (79 ft) long flap gate. Each of these tunnels have the same capacity as both combined can discharge up to 2,250 m^{3}/s (79,000 cu ft/s) of water. The reservoir behind the dam has a catchment area of 18,389 km^{2} (7,100 sq mi), capacity of 1,970,000,000 m^{3} (7.0×10^{10} ft^{3}) and regulating volume of 960,000,000 m^{3} (3.4×10^{10} ft^{3}).

=== Powerhouse ===
The dam's powerhouse is located underground on its right bank and has a width of 20 m (66 ft), length of 126 m (413 ft) and height of 45 m (148 ft). Contained in the powerhouse are vertical Francis turbines that have a combined capacity of 670 MW and annual generation of 2,118 GWh. Water is transferred to the turbines by means of a 9 m (30 ft) diameter penstock. Once through the turbines, water exits the powerhouse via 74 m (243 ft) long horseshoe shaped tail-race tunnels.

== See also ==
- Borçka Dam – downstream
- Artvin Dam – upstream
- List of dams and reservoirs in Turkey
- List of tallest dams in the world
