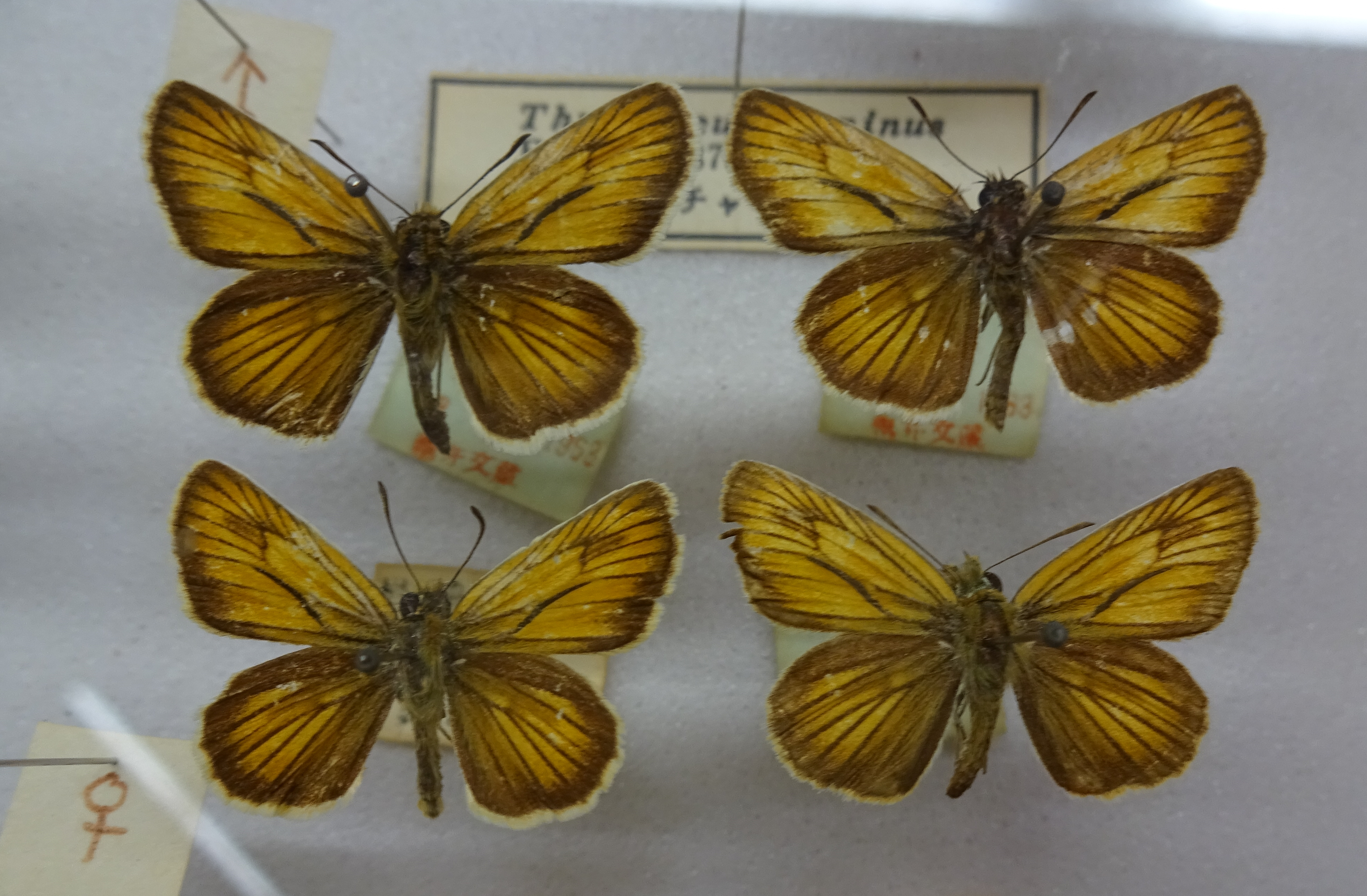

Scientific classification
- Kingdom: Animalia
- Phylum: Arthropoda
- Class: Insecta
- Order: Lepidoptera
- Family: Hesperiidae
- Genus: Thymelicus
- Species: T. leonina

Binomial name
- Thymelicus leonina (Butler, 1878)

= Thymelicus leonina =

Species of butterfly

Thymelicus leonina is a small butterfly found in the East Palearctic ( China, Amur, Ussuri, Japan) that belongs to the skippers family.

== Description from Seitz ==
Male with stigma. Wings above light reddish yellow, all the veins striped with black; border of hindwing broader. On the underside all the veins are heavily black (87 f). Amur and Japan.

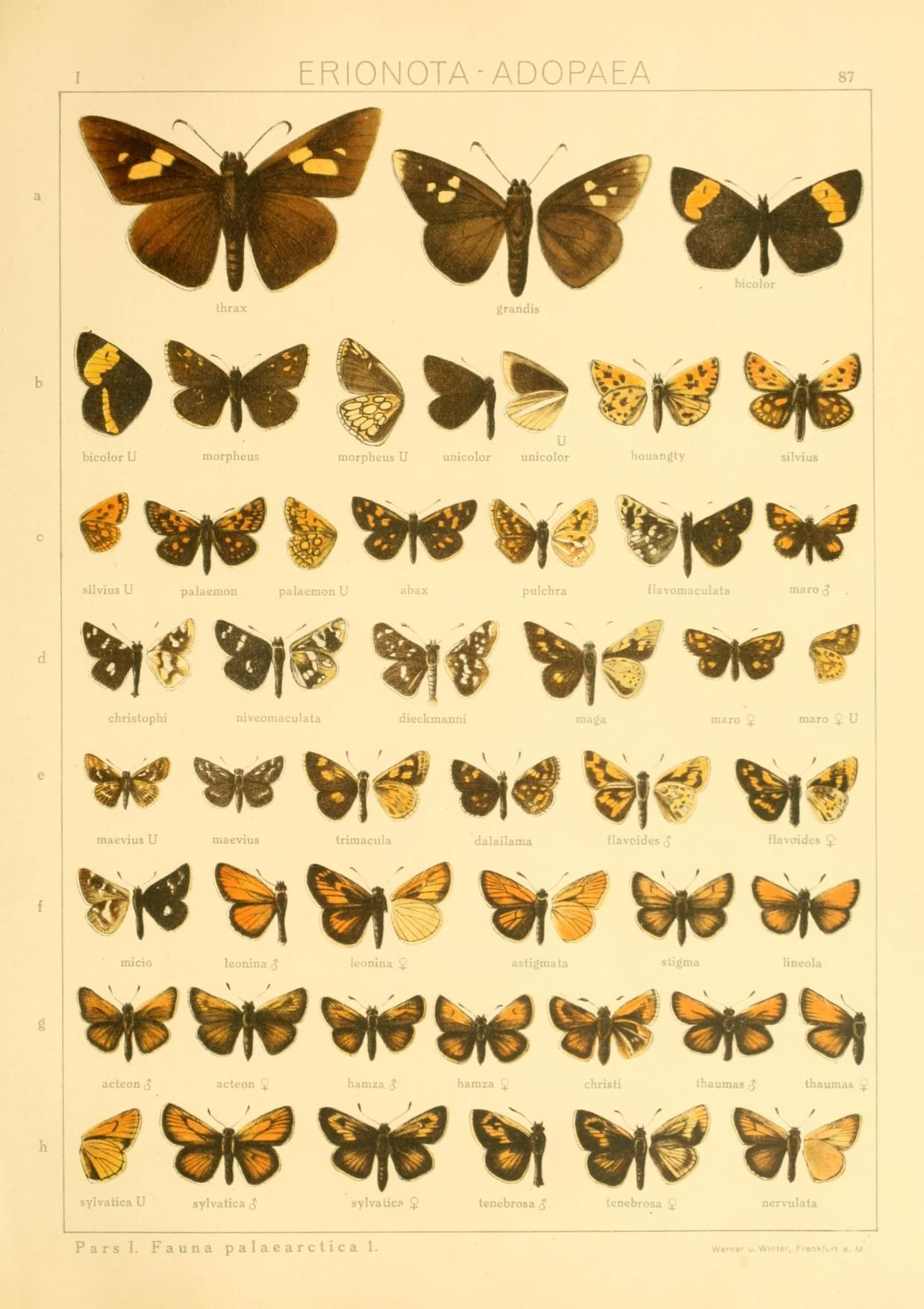
Seitz 87f

== See also ==
- List of butterflies of Russia
