= Muratlı Dam =

- Location within Turkey
- Official name: Muratlı Barajı
- Location: Muratlı village, Borçka, Artvin Province, Turkey
- Coordinates: 41°28′6″N 41°42′48″E
- Construction began: 1999
- Opening date: 2005

Dam and spillways
- Impounds: Çoruh River
- Height: 44 m (144 ft)

Reservoir
- Total capacity: 75 hm^{3} (61,000 acre⋅ft)
- Surface area: 4 km^{2} (1.5 sq mi)

Power Station
- Installed capacity: 115 MW
- Annual generation: 444 GWh
- Website www.dsi.gov.tr

Muratlı Dam (Turkish: Muratlı Barajı) is a dam on the Çoruh River in Muratlı village, 12 km (7.5 mi) north east of Borçka in Artvin Province, Turkey. The construction was backed by the Turkish State Hydraulic Works.

== See also ==
- Borçka Dam – upstream
- List of dams and reservoirs in Turkey
