= Güllübağ Dam =

- Location within Turkey
- Official name: Güllübağ Baraji ve HES
- Country: Turkey
- Location: Güllübağ, Erzurum Province
- Coordinates: 40°31′18.73″N 41°01′17.67″E
- Purpose: Power
- Status: Operational
- Construction began: 2009
- Opening date: 2012
- Owner: State Hydraulic Works

Dam and spillways
- Type of dam: Gravity, roller-compacted concrete
- Impounds: Çoruh River
- Height (thalweg): 61 m (200 ft)
- Spillway type: Controlled overflow

Reservoir
- Total capacity: 20,000,000 m^{3} (16,214 acre⋅ft)
- Catchment area: 5,915 km^{2} (2,284 mi^{2})
- Surface area: 1.21 km^{2} (0 mi^{2})

Güllübağ Hydroelectric Plant
- Coordinates: 40°32′34.82″N 41°2′44.07″E
- Commission date: 2012-2013
- Type: Conventional, diversion
- Hydraulic head: 105 m (344 ft)
- Turbines: 3 x 32 MW Francis-type
- Installed capacity: 96 MW
- Annual generation: 285 GWh (estimate)

The Güllübağ Dam is a gravity dam near the town of Güllübağ on the Çoruh River in Erzurum Province, Turkey. The primary purpose of the dam is hydroelectric power production. Construction on the river diversion tunnel began in 2009 and the dam was complete in 2012. That same year the first generator became operational and the final generator was operational in March 2013. Water from the dam is sent downstream through a 3,200 m (10,500 ft) long penstock where it reaches an 84 MW power station. The dam is part of the Çoruh Development Plan and it is owned by Turkey's State Hydraulic Works.

== See also ==
- Aksu Dam – under construction downstream
