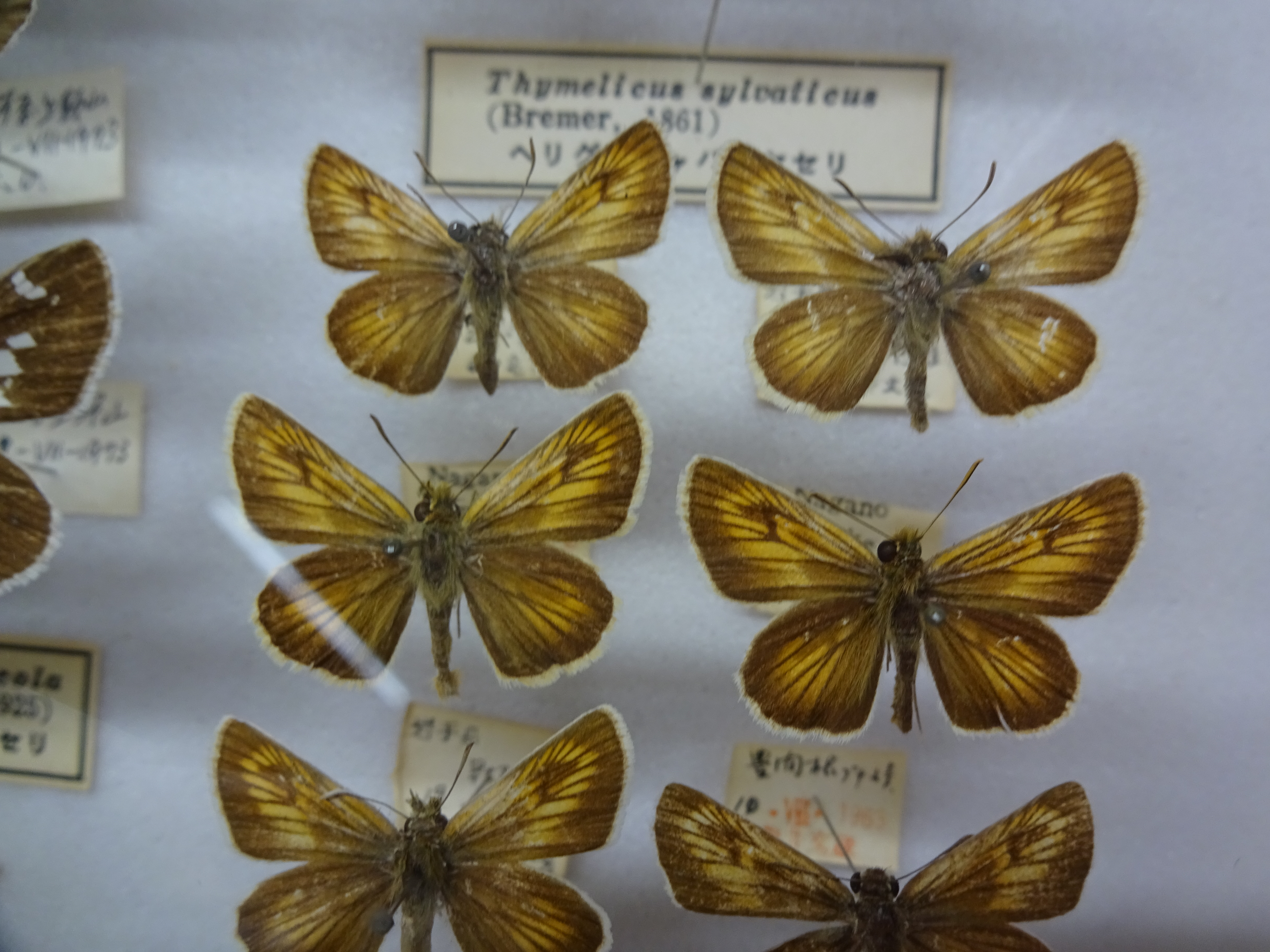

Scientific classification
- Kingdom: Animalia
- Phylum: Arthropoda
- Class: Insecta
- Order: Lepidoptera
- Family: Hesperiidae
- Genus: Thymelicus
- Species: T. sylvatica

Binomial name
- Thymelicus sylvatica (Bremer, 1861)

Synonyms
- Pamphila sylvatica Bremer, 1861; Adopaea astigmata Leech, 1894; Adopaea occidentalis Leech, 1894; Adopaea teneprosa Leech, 1894

= Thymelicus sylvatica =

Species of butterfly

Thymelicus sylvatica is an eastern Palearctic butterfly in the Hesperiidae (Hesperiinae). The species can be found in Amur, Ussuri, southwest China, Korea, and Japan.

The larva feeds on Calamagrostis, Bromus, Agropyron, Brachypodium, Carex.

== Subspecies ==
- T. s. sylvatica
- T. s. astigmatus (Leech, 1894) (Chang Yang)
- T. s. teneprosus (Leech, 1894)
- T. s. occidentalis (Leech, 1894) (Ta Chien Lou)
- T. s. nishimurai Hamada et Fujioka, 1997
