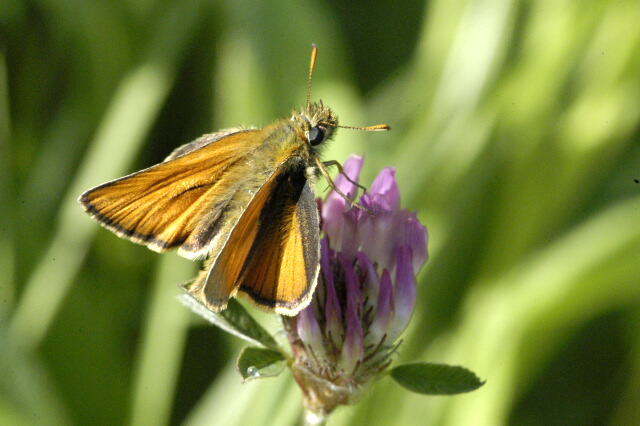
- Male small skipper (Thymelicus sylvestris)

Scientific classification
- Kingdom: Animalia
- Phylum: Arthropoda
- Clade: Pancrustacea
- Class: Insecta
- Order: Lepidoptera
- Family: Hesperiidae
- Subtribe: Thymelicina
- Genus: Thymelicus; Hubner, 1819

Species
- See text

Synonyms
- Adopoea Billberg, 1820; Pelion Kirby, 1858; Doricha Moore, 1883

= Thymelicus =

Genus of butterflies

Thymelicus is a Palearctic genus of skipper butterflies in the family Hesperiidae.

== Species ==
- Thymelicus acteon (Lulworth skipper) - (Rottemburg, 1775)
- Thymelicus alaica - (Filipjev, 1931)
- ?Thymelicus christi (Rebel, 1894) - uncertain taxonomic status
- Thymelicus flavus
- Thymelicus hamza - (Oberthür, 1876)
- Thymelicus hyrax - (Lederer, 1861)
- Thymelicus leonina (Butler, 1878)
- Thymelicus lineola - (Essex skipper)-(Ochsenheimer, 1808)
- Thymelicus nervulata
- Thymelicus novus - (Reverdin, 1916)
- Thymelicus stigma - Staudinger, 1886
- Thymelicus sylvatica - (Bremer, 1861)
- Thymelicus sylvestris (small skipper) - (Poda, 1761)

== References and external links ==
- Hesperiidae page from FaunaItalia
- Markku Savela's Lepidoptera and some other life forms: Preliminary species list. Version of 2006-DEC-31. Retrieved 2007-MAY-28.
- Thymelicus page from Russian-insects.com
- Images representing Thymelicus at Consortium for the Barcode of Life

Thymelicus Fuller distribution

- Media related to Thymelicus at Wikimedia Commons
- Data related to Thymelicus at Wikispecies
