= Laleli Dam =

- Location within Turkey
- Official name: Laleli Baraji ve HES
- Country: Turkey
- Location: Laleli, Erzurum Province
- Coordinates: 40°23′40.04″N 40°36′26.58″E
- Purpose: Power
- Status: Under construction
- Construction began: ?
- Opening date: ?
- Owner: State Hydraulic Works

Dam and spillways
- Type of dam: Embankment, rock-fill
- Impounds: Çoruh River
- Height (foundation): 127.5 m (418 ft)

Reservoir
- Total capacity: 969,000,000 m^{3} (785,581 acre⋅ft)
- Catchment area: 4,759 km^{2} (1,837 mi^{2})

Power Station
- Commission date: 2017
- Hydraulic head: 138 m (453 ft) (gross)
- Installed capacity: 99 MW
- Annual generation: 244 GWh (estimate)

The Laleli Dam is an embankment dam, currently under construction near the town of Laleli on the Çoruh River in Erzurum Province, Turkey. The primary purpose of the dam is hydroelectric power production. The dam, which will power a 99 MW power station, will also flood several settlements, including Laleli. The dam's reservoir will stretch east into Bayburt Province.
