= Arkun Dam =

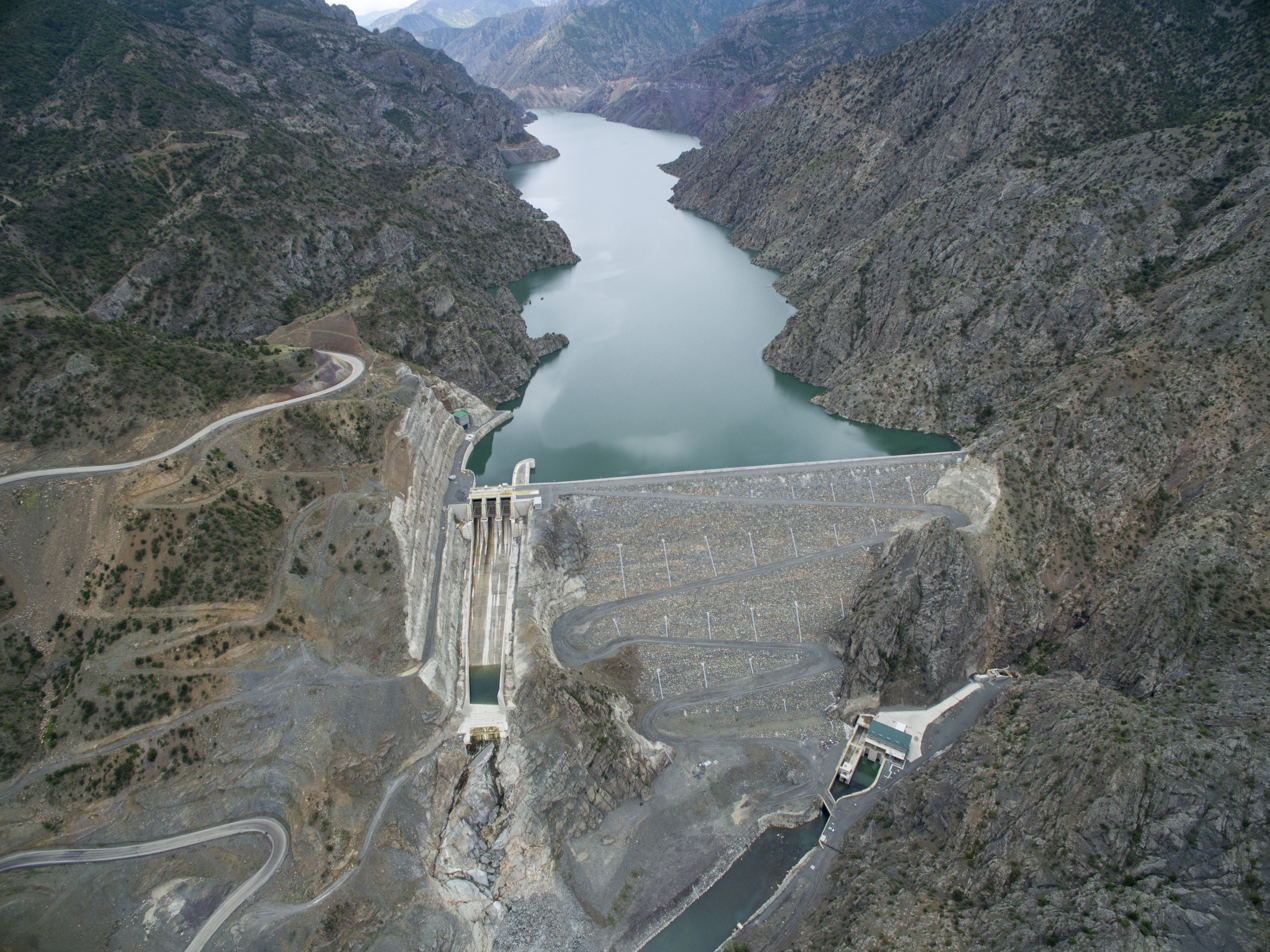

- Location within Turkey
- Country: Turkey
- Location: İspir, Erzurum Province
- Coordinates: 40°40′34.25″N 41°17′21.09″E
- Purpose: Power
- Status: Operational
- Construction began: 2011
- Opening date: 2014
- Owner: State Hydraulic Works

Dam and spillways
- Type of dam: Embankment, earth-fill
- Impounds: Çoruh River
- Height (foundation): 188 m (617 ft)
- Height (thalweg): 140 m (459 ft)
- Dam volume: 6,774,345 m^{3} (8,860,509 cu yd)

Reservoir
- Catchment area: 6,853 km^{2} (2,646 mi^{2})

Power Station
- Commission date: June 2014
- Hydraulic head: Downstream: 225 m (738 ft) (gross); Toe: 225 m (738 ft) 121 m (397 ft) (nominal)
- Turbines: Downstream: 3 x 75 MW Francis-type; Toe: 2 x 5.96 MW Francis-type
- Installed capacity: 236.92 MW
- Annual generation: 788 GWh (estimate)

The Arkun Dam is an embankment dam on the Çoruh River near İspir in Erzurum Province, Turkey. Construction began in 2011 and the primary purpose of the dam is hydroelectric power generation. It is part of the Çoruh Development Plan and its construction was supervised by Turkey's State Hydraulic Works. The dam and power plant were completed early, in June 2014. Water from the dam's reservoir supplies two power stations; one at the dam's toe (base) (11.92 MW) and the other downstream (225 MW) in Artvin Province.

== See also ==
- Yusufeli Dam – under construction downstream
