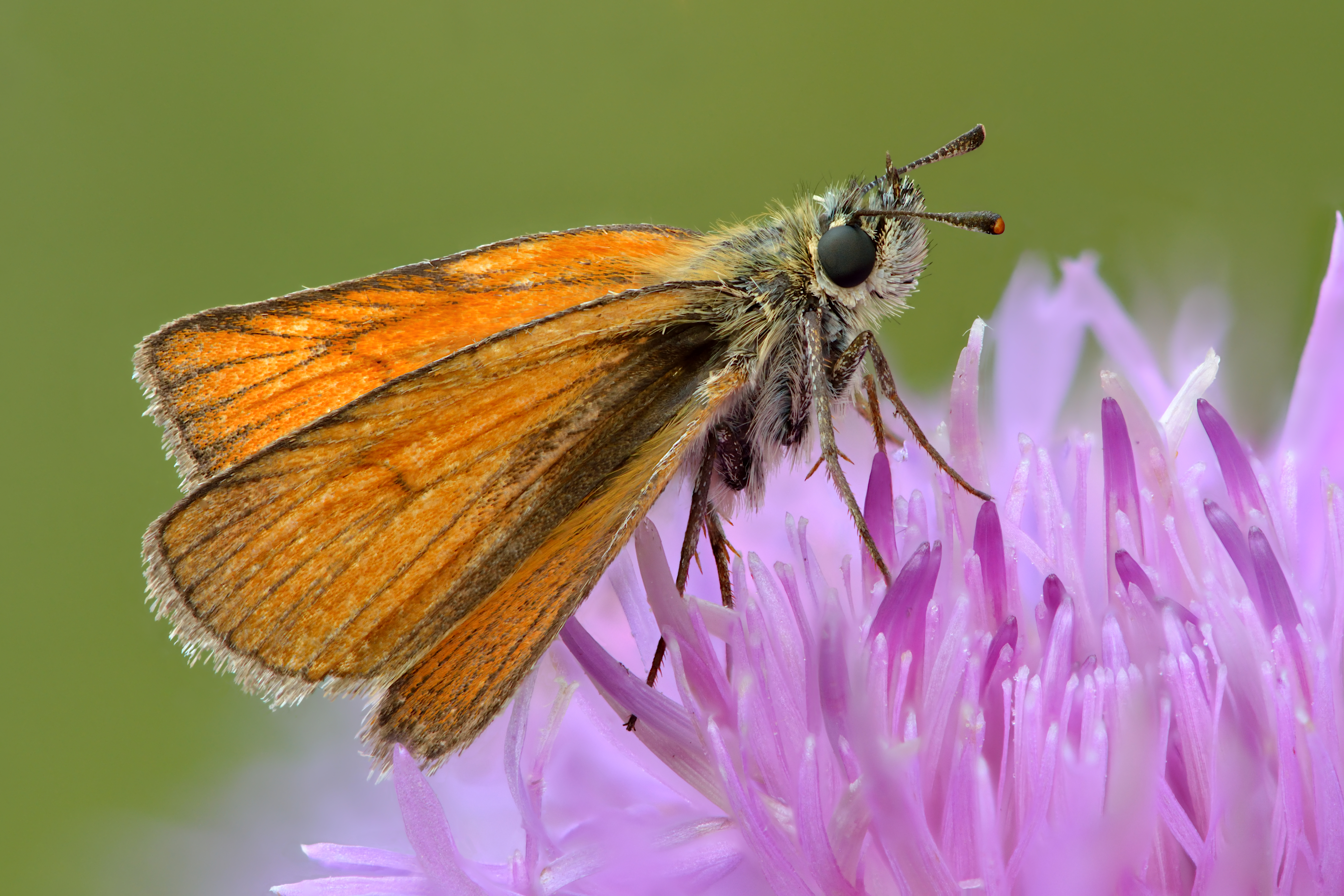
- Female

Scientific classification
- Kingdom: Animalia
- Phylum: Arthropoda
- Class: Insecta
- Order: Lepidoptera
- Family: Hesperiidae
- Genus: Thymelicus
- Species: T. sylvestris

Binomial name
- Thymelicus sylvestris (Poda, 1761)

= Small skipper =

Species of butterfly

The small skipper (Thymelicus sylvestris) is a butterfly of the family Hesperiidae.

== Appearance ==
It has a rusty orange colour to the wings, upper body, and the tips of the antennae. The body is silvery white below, and it has a wingspan of 25–30 mm (0.98–1.18 in). This butterfly is very similar in appearance to the Essex skipper (Thymelicus lineola). In the small skipper, the undersides of the tips of the antennae are yellow orange, whereas they are black in the Essex skipper. The black area on the lower edge of the upper wings also differs. Like the other orange grass skippers, the male has a distinctive black stripe made up of scent scales.

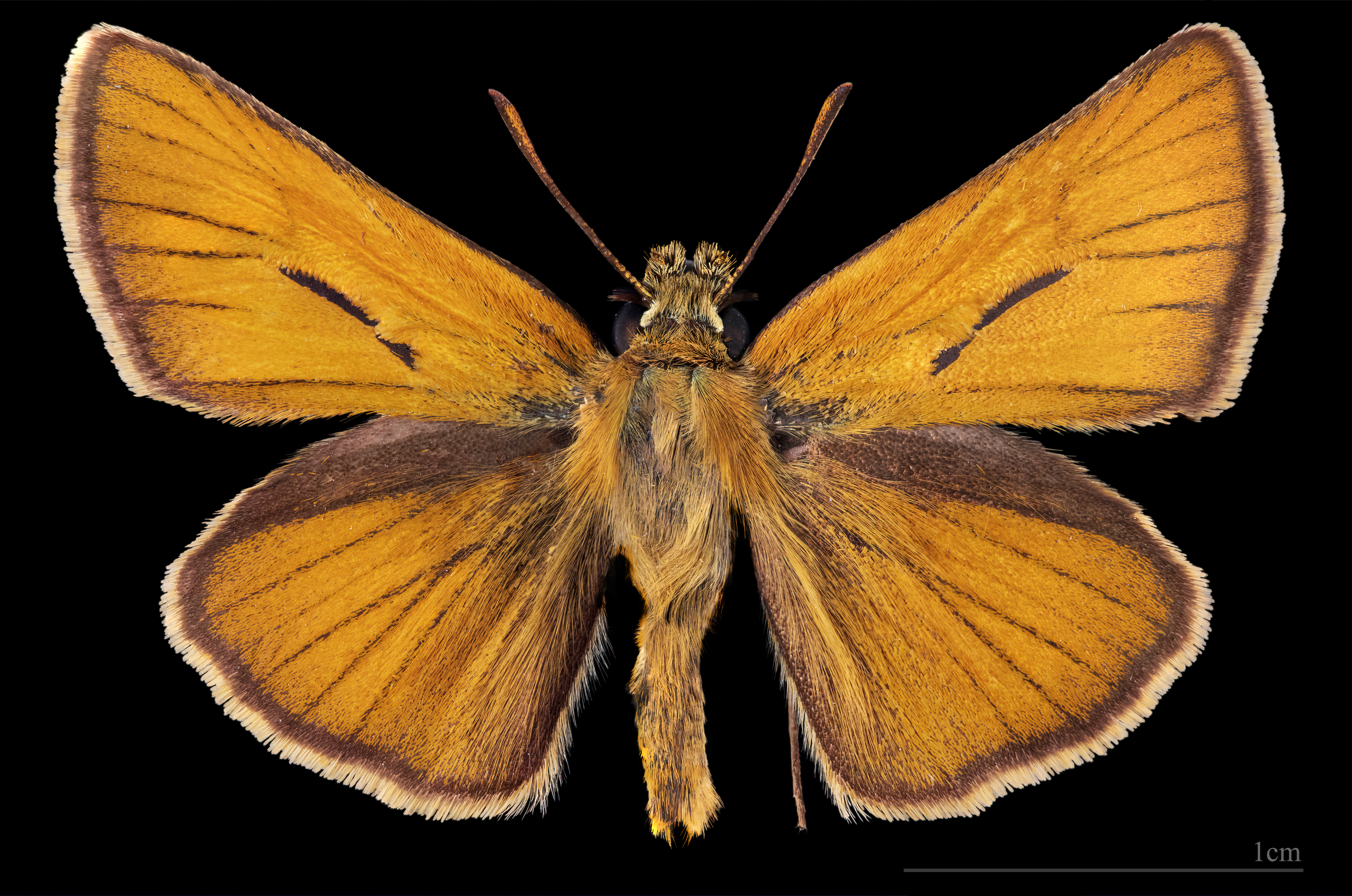
Thymelicus sylvestris ♂

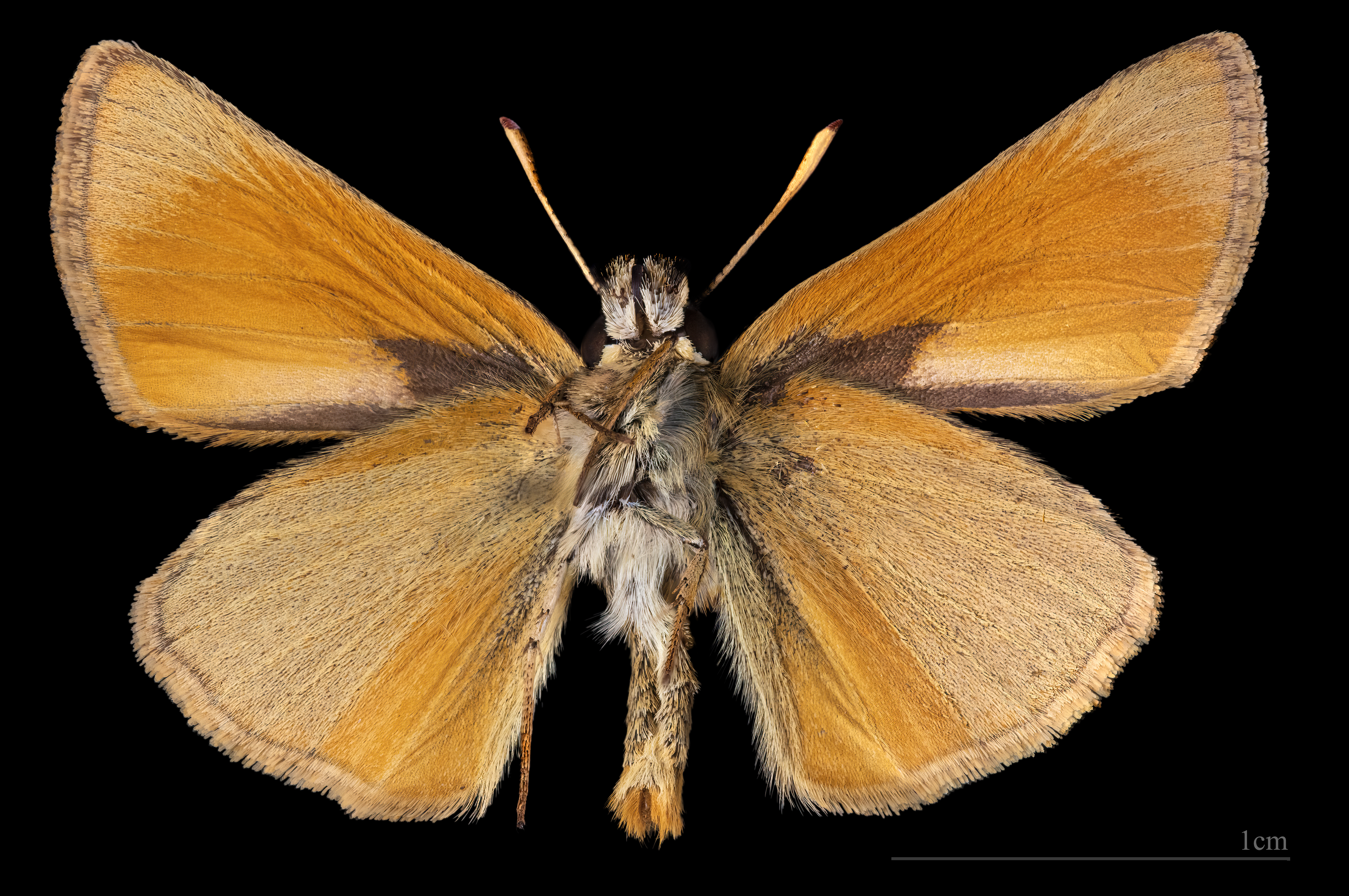
♂ △

== Distribution ==
This butterfly's range includes much of Europe (east to the Urals, including Ireland, Britain and Scandinavia), north Africa and the Middle East. It is typically occurring where grass has grown tall.

== Life cycle and food plants ==
Eggs are laid loosely inside grass sheaths of the caterpillars food plants from July to August. The newly hatched caterpillars eat their own eggshell before entering hibernation individually in a protective cocoon of a grass sheath sealed with silk. In the spring the caterpillar begins feeding. The favoured food plant is Yorkshire fog (Holcus lanatus), although other recorded food plants include timothy (Phleum pratense), creeping soft grass (Holcus mollis), false brome (Brachypodium sylvaticum), meadow foxtail (Alopecurus pratensis) and cock's foot (Dactylis glomerata). The caterpillars pupate near the base of the food plant in June with the first adults on the wing at the end of June, a week or two before the first Essex skippers. They are strongly attracted to purple flowers such as thistles and knapweeds.

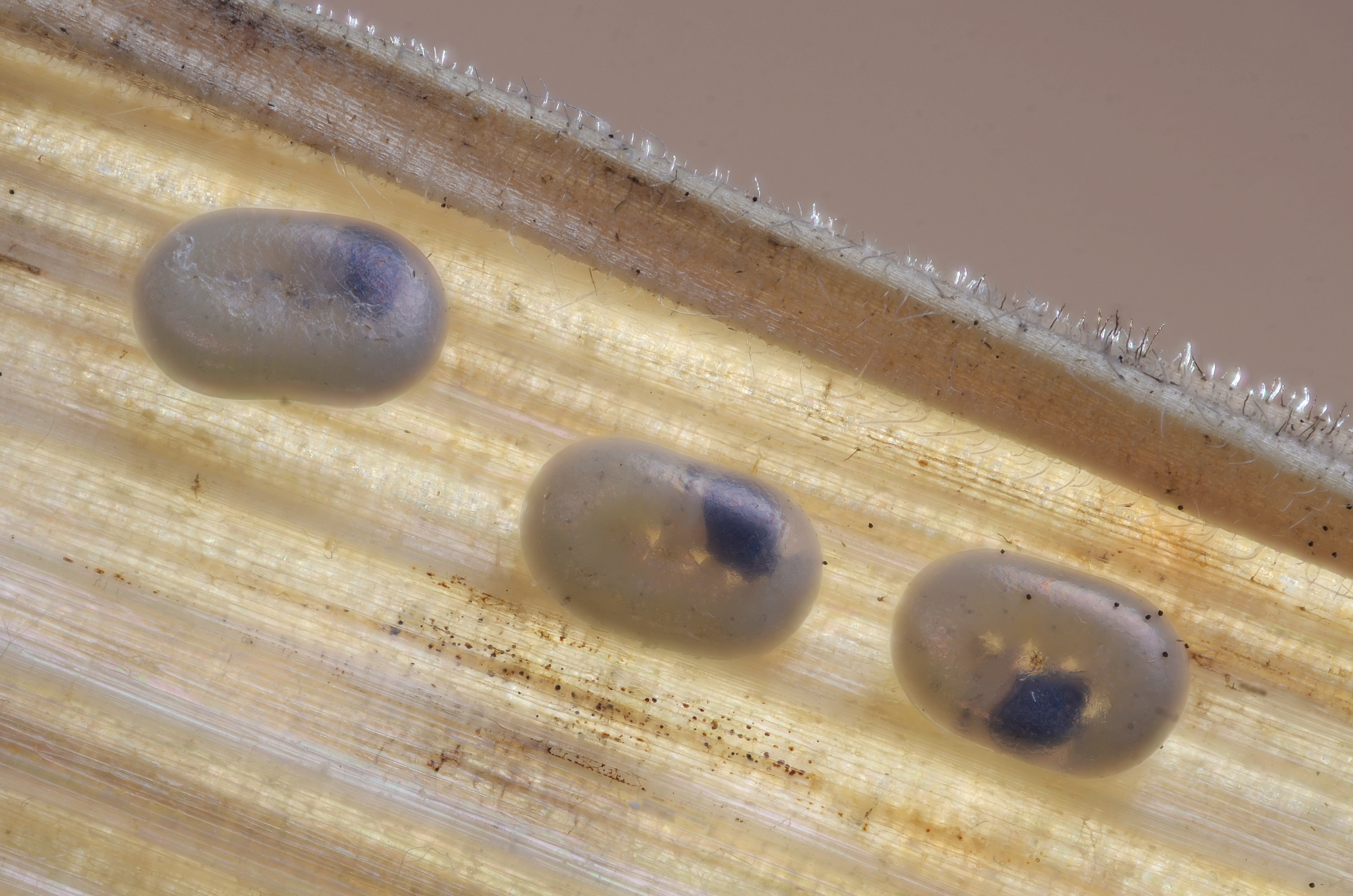
Eggs

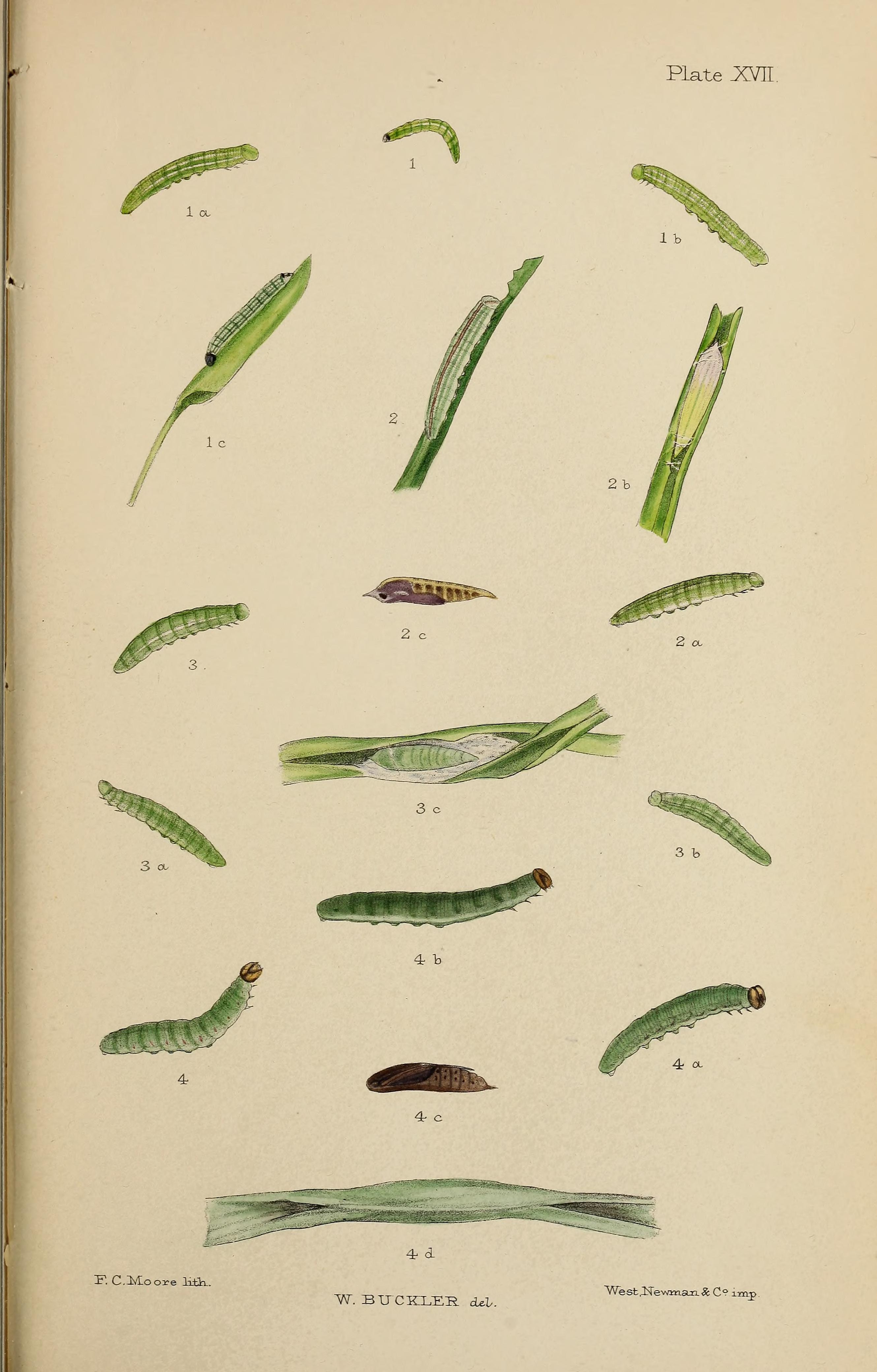
figs 3, 3a, 3b larvae after last moult;3c pupa

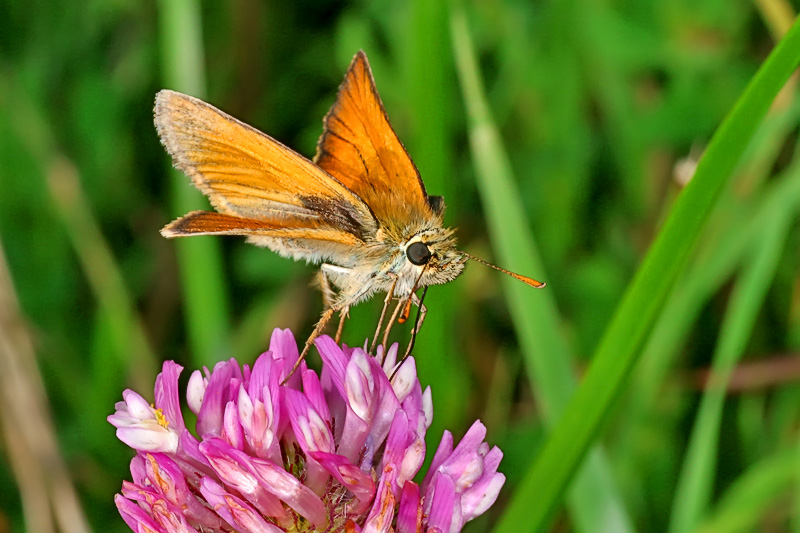
Small skipper
(Germany 2009)
