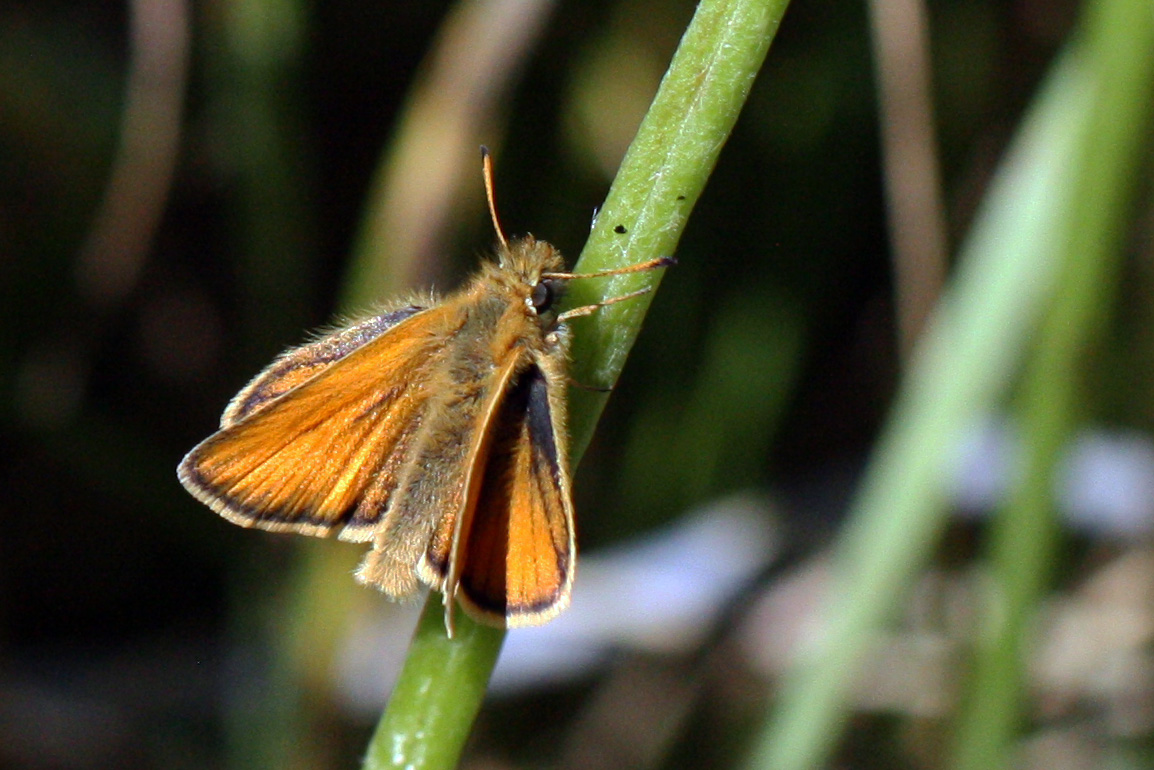

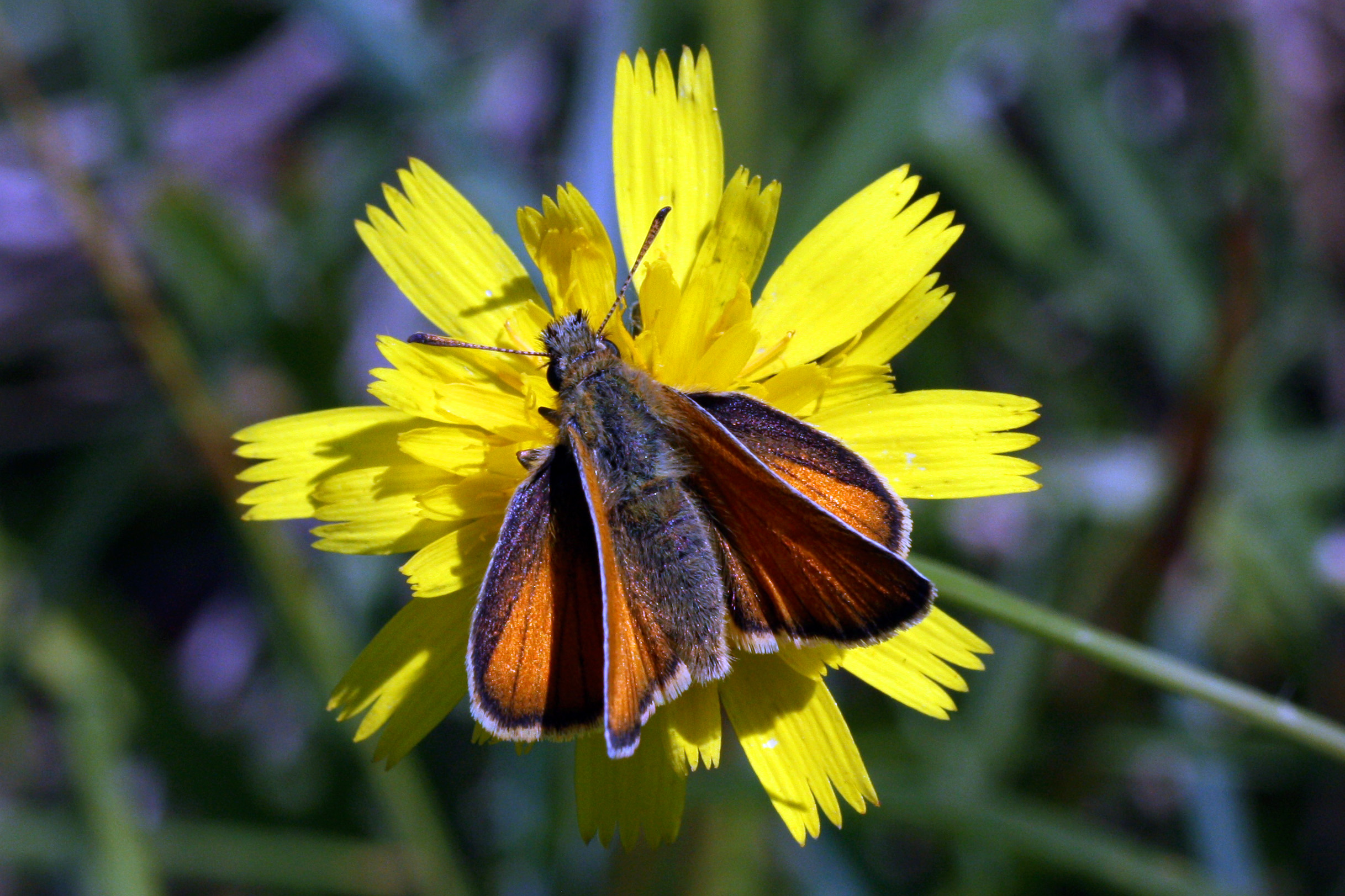
- male and female

Conservation status
- Secure (NatureServe)

Scientific classification
- Kingdom: Animalia
- Phylum: Arthropoda
- Class: Insecta
- Order: Lepidoptera
- Family: Hesperiidae
- Genus: Thymelicus
- Species: T. lineola

Binomial name
- Thymelicus lineola (Ochsenheimer, 1808)

= Essex skipper =

Essex skipper or European skipper

Species of butterfly

Thymelicus lineola, known in Europe as the Essex skipper and in North America as the European skipper, is a species of butterfly in the family Hesperiidae.

With a wingspan of 2.5 to 2.9 cm (0.98 to 1.14 in), it is very similar in appearance to the small skipper, Thymelicus sylvestris. They can be told apart by the forward-facing flattish part of the antenna tip: in the Essex Skipper this face is black, whereas in the Small Skipper it is orange or brown. In males, there is a difference in the scent mark. In Essex Skipper this is a fine, straight, short dark line on the forewing, parallel to the wing edge; in the Small Skipper males, this line is bolder and bent. This butterfly occurs throughout much of the Palaearctic region. Its range is from southern Scandinavia through Europe to North Africa and east to Central Asia. It was only identified in the UK in 1889, and its range is expanding both in England and in northern Europe. In North America, this butterfly was accidentally introduced in 1910 via London, Ontario and has spread across southern Canada and into several northern US states. In many parts of the Northeastern United States it is the most abundant skipper.

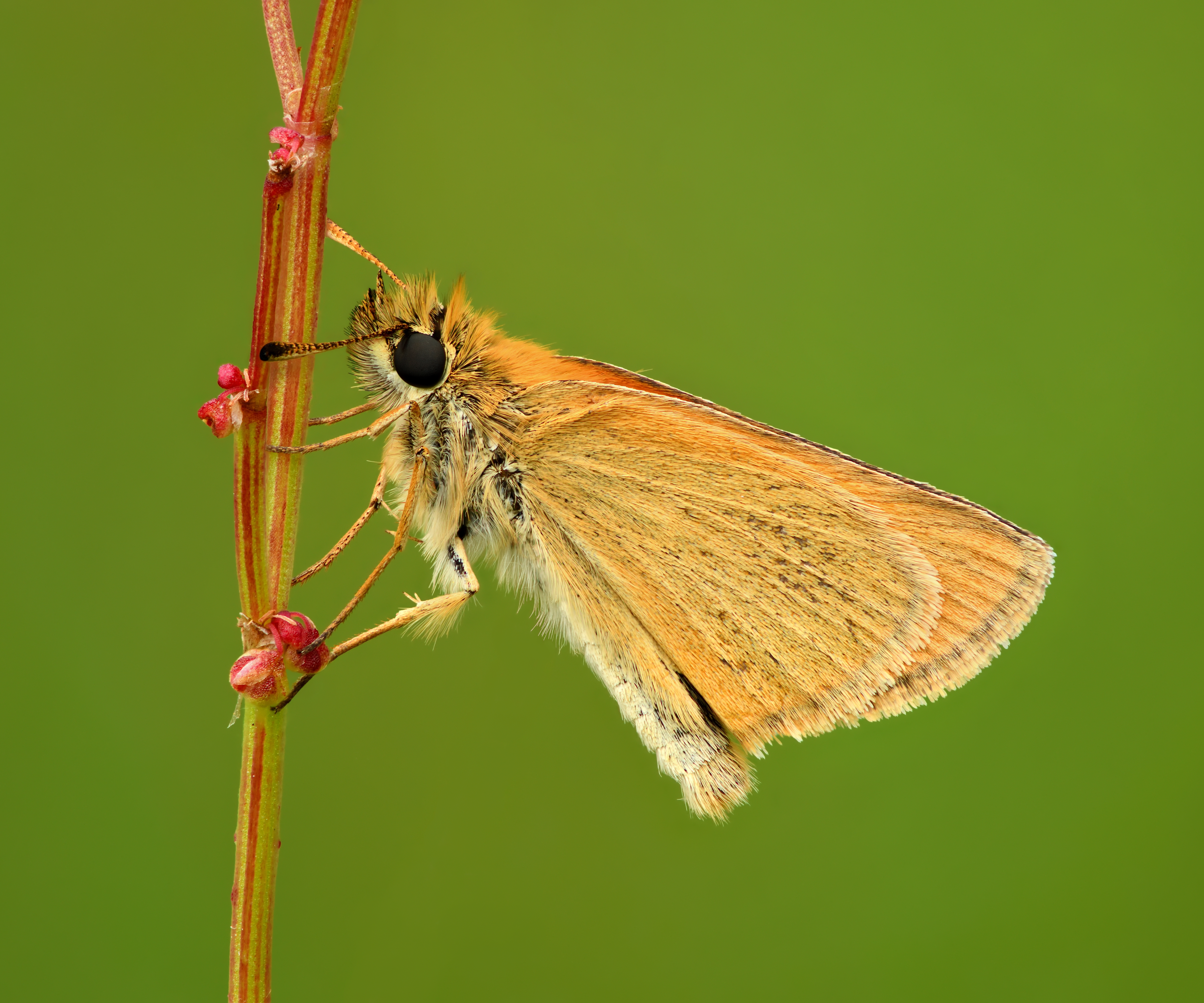
Note the black part of the antenna tip

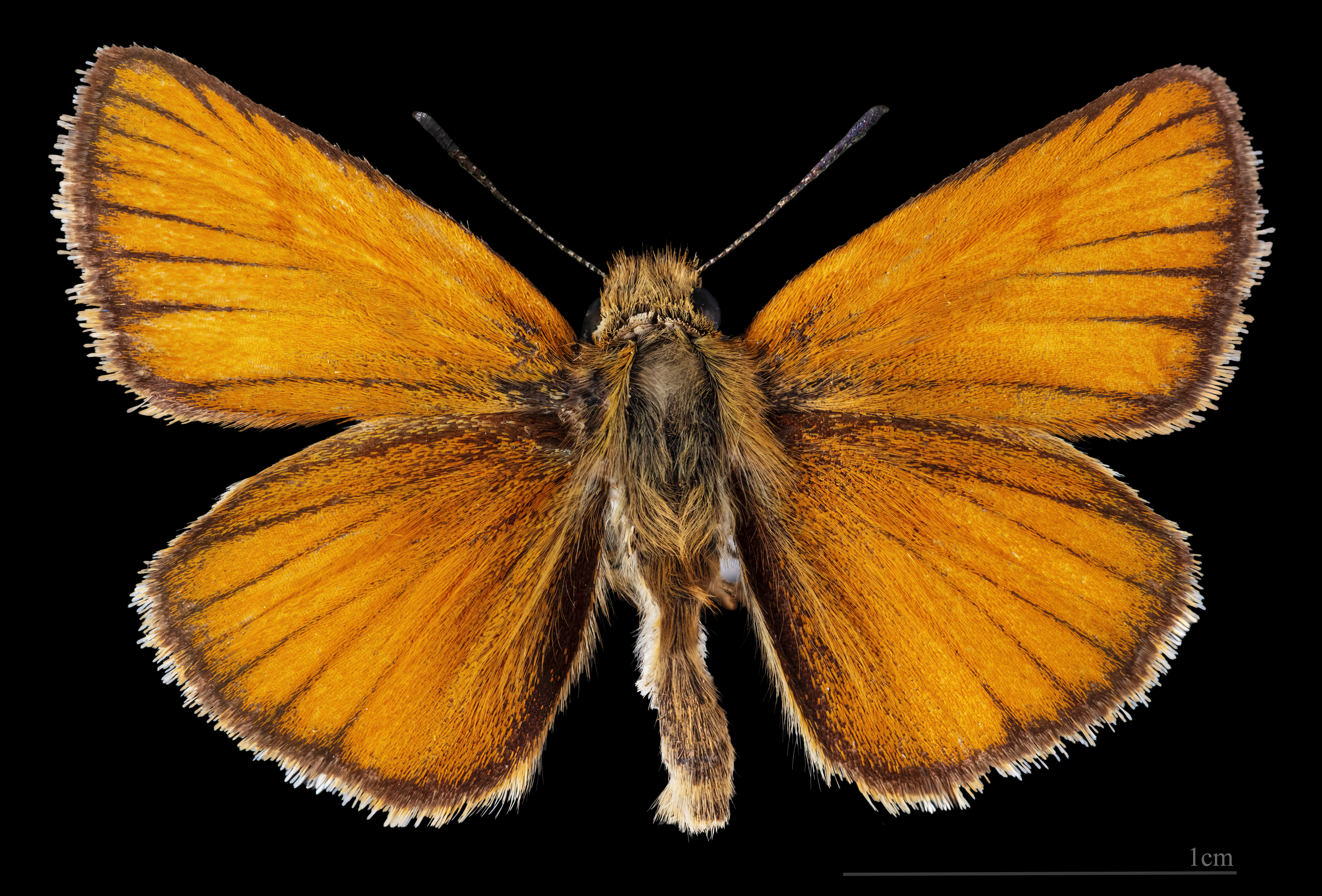
Thymelicus lineola ♂

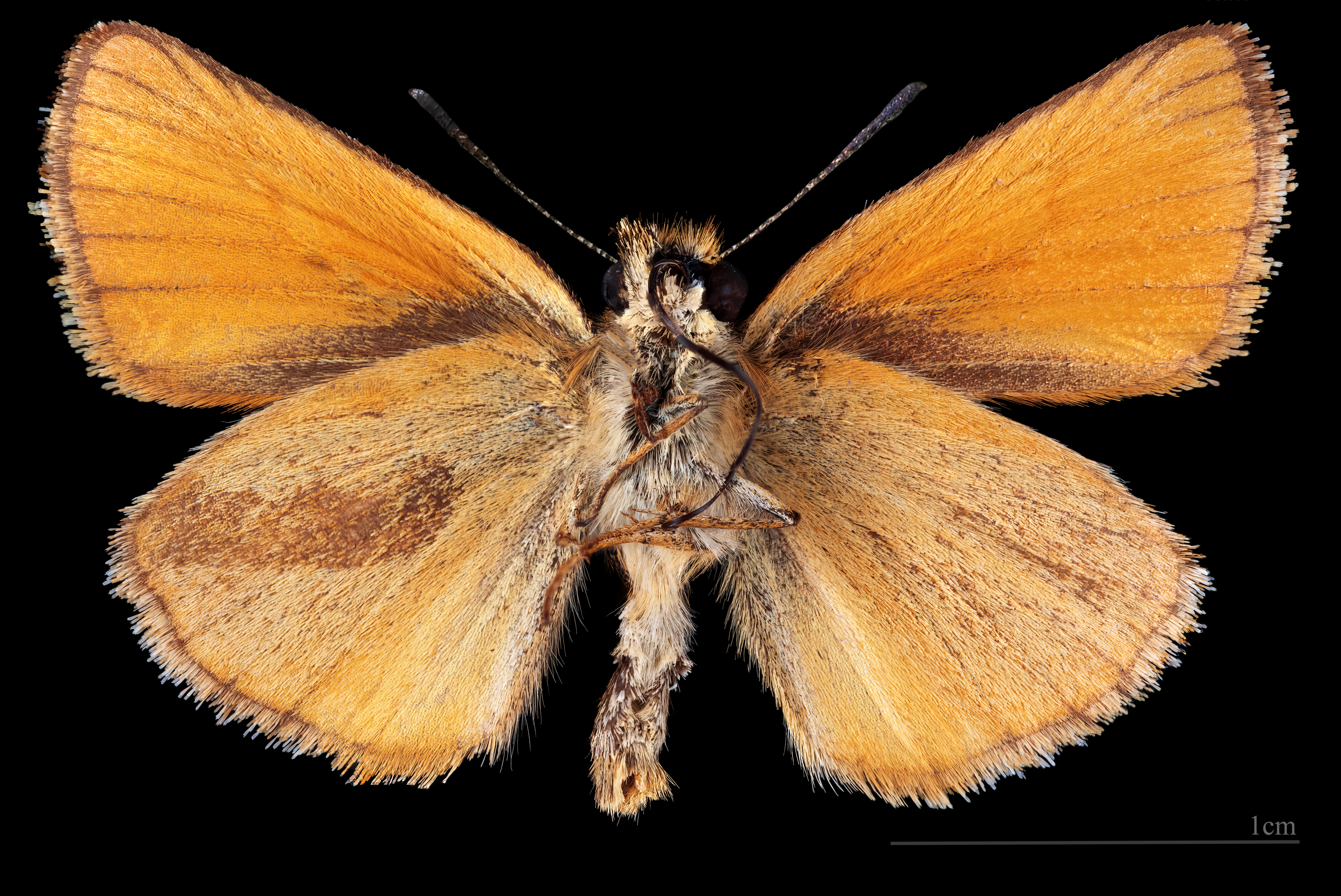
♂ ventral view

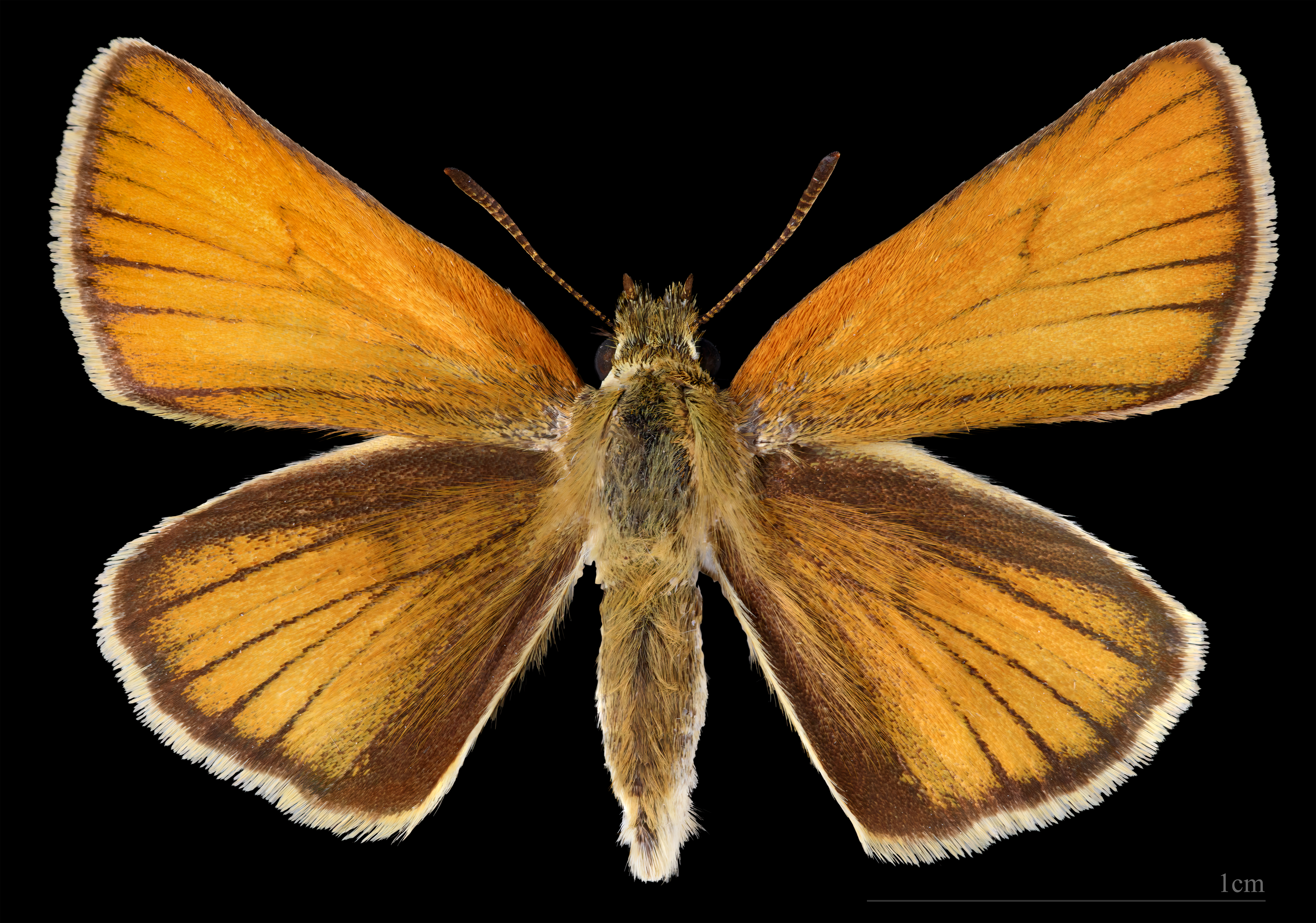
♀

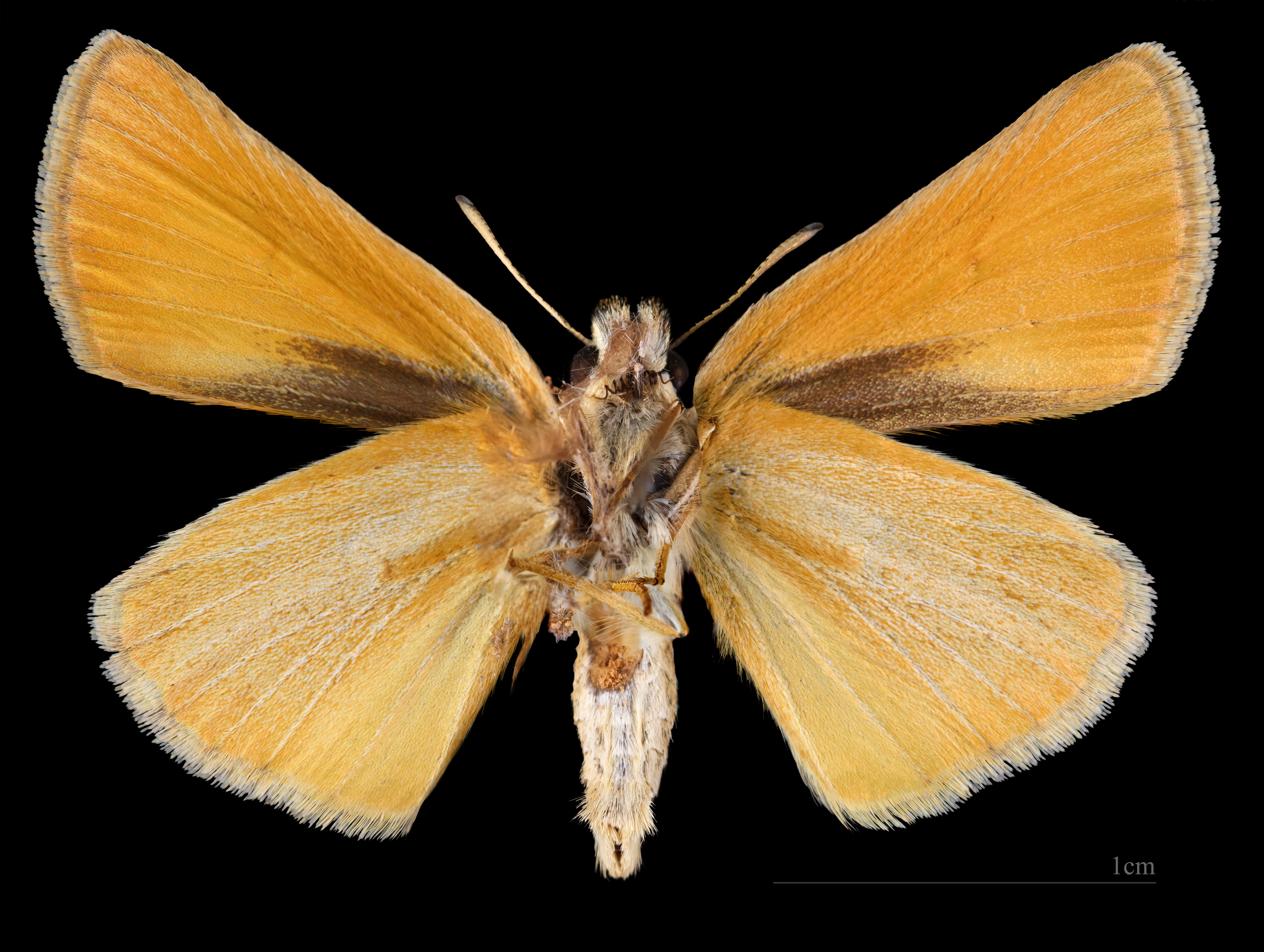
♀ ventral view

== Life cycle ==
Eggs are laid in strings on the stems of grasses where they remain over the winter. The Essex skipper's favoured foodplant is cock's-foot (Dactylis glomerata), and it rarely uses the small skipper's favoured foodplant Yorkshire fog. Essex skippers' other foods include creeping soft grass (Holcus mollis), couch grass (Elymus repens), timothy-grass (Phleum pratense), meadow foxtail (Alopecurus pratensis), false brome (Brachypodium sylvaticum) and tor-grass (Brachypodium pinnatum). This skipper's caterpillars emerge in the spring and feed until June before forming shelters from leaves tied with silk at the base of the foodplant to pupate. Adults fly from July through August. Like most skippers, they are fairly strictly diurnal, though individuals are very rarely encountered during the night.

This skipper's oval eggs are pale greenish-yellow, flattened above and below with slightly depressed tops. Caterpillars are green, with yellowish incisions between their rings; each with a dorsal, darker green stripe and yellow lateral lines. A larva's head is pale brown striped with darker brown. Their elongate chrysalids are yellowish-green, and each has a dark dorsal stripe seen in caterpillars.

== See also ==
- List of butterflies of Great Britain
