= List of municipalities in Adıyaman Province =

This is a List of municipalities in Adıyaman Province, Turkey as of January 2023.

Municipality	District	Population (2021)
Adıyaman	Adıyaman (Merkez)	267,131
Akıncılar	Kahta	1,658
Balkar	Gölbaşı	2,091
Belören	Gölbaşı	2,015
Besni	Besni	37,323
Bölükyayla	Kahta	2,141
Çakırhüyük	Besni	2,210
Çelikhan	Çelikhan	8,473
Gerger	Gerger	2,753
Gölbaşı	Gölbaşı	33,373
Harmanlı	Gölbaşı	1,585
İnlice	Sincik	2,192
Kâhta	Kâhta	86,232
Kesmetepe	Besni	1,582
Kömür	Adıyaman	3,062
Köseceli	Besni	1,948
Pınarbaşı	Çelikhan	3,193
Şambayat	Besni	3,468
Samsat	Samsat	4,210
Sincik	Sincik	4,344
Suvarlı	Besni	1,927
Tut	Tut	3,388
Yaylakonak	Adıyaman	1,736
