= Güzelyurt (disambiguation) =

Güzelyurt is a district of Aksaray Province, Turkey.

Güzelyurt means "beautiful homeland" in Turkish and may also refer to:

- Güzelyurt, Adıyaman, a village in the central district of Adıyaman Province, Turkey
- Güzelyurt, Besni, a village in Besni district of Adıyaman Province, Turkey
- Güzelyurt, Ardahan, a village in the central district of Ardahan Province, Turkey
- Güzelyurt, Borçka, a village in Borçka district of Artvin Province, Turkey
- Güzelyurt, Çameli
- Güzelyurt, Çorum
- Güzelyurt, Ergani
- Güzelyurt, Mut, a village in Mut district of Mersin Province, Turkey
- Güzelyurt, Palandöken
- Morphou, a town in Cyprus, known as Güzelyurt in Turkish
