= Aktepe =

Aktepe (literally "white hill") is a Turkic name that may refer to:

- Aktepe, Besni, a village in the district of Besni, Adıyaman Province, Turkey
- Aktepe, Çınar, a village in Diyarbakır Province, Turkey
- Aktepe, Hassa, a town in the district of Hassa, Hatay Province, Turkey
- Aktepe, Haymana, a village in the district of Haymana, Ankara Province, Turkey
- Aktepe, Kalecik, a village in the district of Kalecik, Ankara Province, Turkey
- Aktepe, Mengen, a village in the district of Mengen, Bolu Province, Turkey
- Ankara Aktepe Stadium, a multi-use stadium in Ankara Province, Turkey

== See also ==
- Aktobe
- Aq Tappeh (disambiguation)
