= Berete =

Berete could refer to:

- Berete, Besni, a village in Besni District, Adıyaman Province, Turkey
- Fanta Berete (born 1975), French politician
- Framoi Bérété (1915–1974), Guinean accountant and politician
- Sassouma Bereté (fl. 13th century), wife of the king of the Mali Empire

== See also ==
- Beret (disambiguation)
