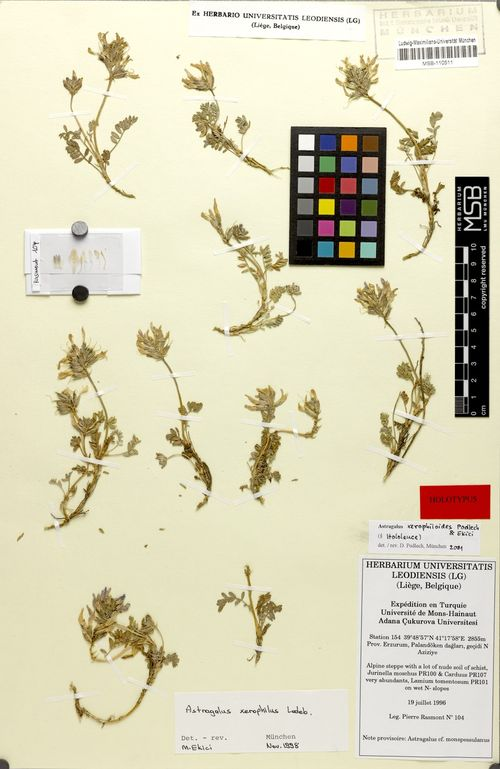

Scientific classification
- Kingdom: Plantae
- Clade: Tracheophytes
- Clade: Angiosperms
- Clade: Eudicots
- Clade: Rosids
- Order: Fabales
- Family: Fabaceae
- Subfamily: Faboideae
- Genus: Astragalus
- Species: A. xerophiloides

Binomial name
- Astragalus xerophiloides Podlech & Ekici

= Astragalus xerophiloides =

Species of flowering plant

Astragalus xerophiloides is a species of flowering plant in the family Fabaceae.

The species is native to the temperate biome of eastern Turkey and the Transcaucasus.

== Description ==
Astragalus xerophiloides is a perennial. It is similar to Astragalus xerophilus, but has longer petals, stipules, and bracts.

A. xerophiloides are 7–12 centimetres (2.8–4.7 in) tall, and have well developed stems. The plants are smooth, or they may have white hairs. The leaves are 1.5–3 centimetres (0.59–1.18 in) long. The leaflets are in 6-8 pairs, and are narrow and elliptical in shape. Leaflets are 3–7 millimetres (0.12–0.28 in) long, and 0.8–2 millimetres (0.031–0.079 in) wide. The leaflets have white hairs.

The flower stalks are 2–7 centimetres (0.79–2.76 in) long, and have black and white hairs. The calyx is 7–8 centimetres (2.8–3.1 in) long, and tube-shaped. The petals are lilac in colour, but fade to yellowish-brown. The legumes have black and white hairs.

== Taxonomy ==
A. xerophiloides was described in 2002. The holotype was collected in 1996, in Palandöken, Erzurum, Turkey.
