= Çaykaya =

Çaykaya (literally "stream boulder") is a Turkish place name that may refer to the following places in Turkey:

- Çaykaya, Besni, a village in the district of Besni, Adıyaman Province
- Çaykaya, Kalecik, a village in the district of Kalecik, Ankara Province
