= Akkaynak =

Akkaynak refers to:

- Atakan Akkaynak (born 1999), German football midfielder
- Derya Akkaynak, Turkish mechanical engineer
- Akkaynak, Kalecik, neighbourhood in the municipality and district of Kalecik, Ankara, Turkey
