= Aq Tappeh =

Aq Tappeh or Aqtappeh (Persian: اق تپه), also rendered as Aq Tepe, may refer to:

- Aq Tappeh, Hamadan
- Aq Tappeh, Kabudarahang, Hamadan Province
- Aq Tappeh, Kurdistan
- Aq Tappeh, North Khorasan
- Aq Tappeh, West Azerbaijan

== See also ==
- Aktepe
