= Kızılkaya =

Kızılkaya ("redrock") is a Turkish name that may refer to:

== Places in Turkey ==
- Kızılkaya, Burdur, a town in the district of Bucak, Burdur Province
- Kızılkaya, Besni, a village in the district of Besni, Adıyaman Province
- Kızılkaya, Gülağaç, a village in the district of Gülağaç, Aksaray Province
- Kızılkaya, Gülşehir, a village in the district of Gülşehir, Nevşehir Province
- Kızılkaya, Kalecik, a village in the district of Kalecik, Ankara Province
- Kızılkaya, Koçarlı, a village in the district of Koçarlı, Aydın Province
- Kızılkaya, Toroslar, a village in the district of Toroslar, Mersin Province

== Surname ==
- Elif Kızılkaya (born 1991), Turkish female curler
