= Kesecik =

Kesecik (literally "sachet") is a Turkish word that may refer to the following places in Turkey:

- Kesecik, Besni, a village in the district of Besni, Adıyaman Province
- Kesecik, Çamlıyayla, a village in Çamlıyayla district of Mersin Province
- Kesecik, Korgun
