= Yukarısöğütlü =

Yukarısöğütlü can refer to:

- Yukarısöğütlü, Besni
- Yukarısöğütlü, Köprüköy
