= Değirmenkaya =

Değirmenkaya can refer to:

- Değirmenkaya, Kalecik
- Değirmenkaya, Karayazı
- Değirmenkaya, Seben
