= Topkapı =

Topkapı ("cannonball gate"), sometimes spelled Topkapi outside of Turkey, is a Turkish word that may refer to:

== Places ==
- Topkapı, Besni, a village in the district of Besni, Adıyaman Province, Turkey
- Topkapı, Fatih, a neighborhood of Istanbul, Turkey, near the Roman city walls
- Topkapı, Kemaliye, a village in the district of Kemaliye, Erzincan Province, Turkey
- Topkapı Palace, a museum in Istanbul, Turkey, previously residence to sultans of the Ottoman Empire

== The Arts ==
- Topkapi (album), a 1964 jazz recording by organist Jimmy McGriff
- Topkapi (film), a 1964 caper movie adapted from the Eric Ambler novel
- The Light of Day (Eric Ambler novel), a 1962 museum-heist thriller also published as Topkapi

== Other ==
- Topkapı Scroll, a Timurid dynasty pattern scroll at the Topkapı Palace museum's collection
- Nesrin Topkapı (born 1951), Turkish belly dancer
