= Eşmedere =

Eşmedere can refer to the following villages in Turkey:

- Eşmedere, Kalecik
- Eşmedere, Sındırgı
