= Harmanardı =

Harmanardı can refer to:

- Harmanardı, Besni
- Harmanardı, Kayapınar
