= Akkuyu =

Akkuyu (literally "white well") is a Turkic word that may refer to:

- Akkuyu, Besni, village in Adıyaman Province, Turkey
- Akkuyu, Sarıçam, village in Adana Province, Turkey

== See also ==
- Akkuyu Nuclear Power Plant, a planned nuclear power plant in Mersin Province, Turkey
