= Tokar =

Tokar may refer to:

== People ==
- Eliot Tokar, American practitioner of Tibetan medicine, author and lecturer
- František Tokár (1925–1993), Slovak table tennis player
- Moishe Tokar (fl. 1905–1910), Jewish anarchist
- Norman Tokar (1919–1979), American director
- Olena Tokar (born 1987), Ukrainian opera singer

== Places ==
- Tokar, Besni, a village in the district of Besni, Adıyaman Province, Turkey
- Tokar, Sudan
