= Beşyol =

Beşyol may refer to:

- Beşyol, Besni, a village in Adıyaman Province, Turkey
- Beşyol, Eceabat, a village in Çanakkale Province, Turkey
- Beşyol, Küçükçekmece, a neighborhood of Küçükçekmece, Istanbul, Turkey
