= Sugözü =

Sugözü (literally "water eye") is a Turkish place name that may refer to the following places in Turkey:

- Sugözü, Anamur, a village in Anamur district of Mersin Province
- Sugözü, Besni, a village in the district of Besni, Adıyaman Province
- Sugözü, Gazipaşa, a village in the district of Gazipaşa, Antalya Province
- Sugözü, Yumurtalık, a village in the district of Yumurtalık, Adana Province
