= Tilki =

Tilki is a surname. In Turkish, it is a nickname meaning "fox". Notable people with the name include:

- Aleyna Tilki (2000), Turkish singer and songwriter
- Attila Tilki (1967), Hungarian jurist and politician

== See also ==
- Tilki, Kalecik, a neighborhood of Ankara, Turkey
