= Toklu =

Toklu can refer to:

- Toklu, Besni
- Toklu, Oltu
- Toklu Dede Mosque
