= Besni District =

- District
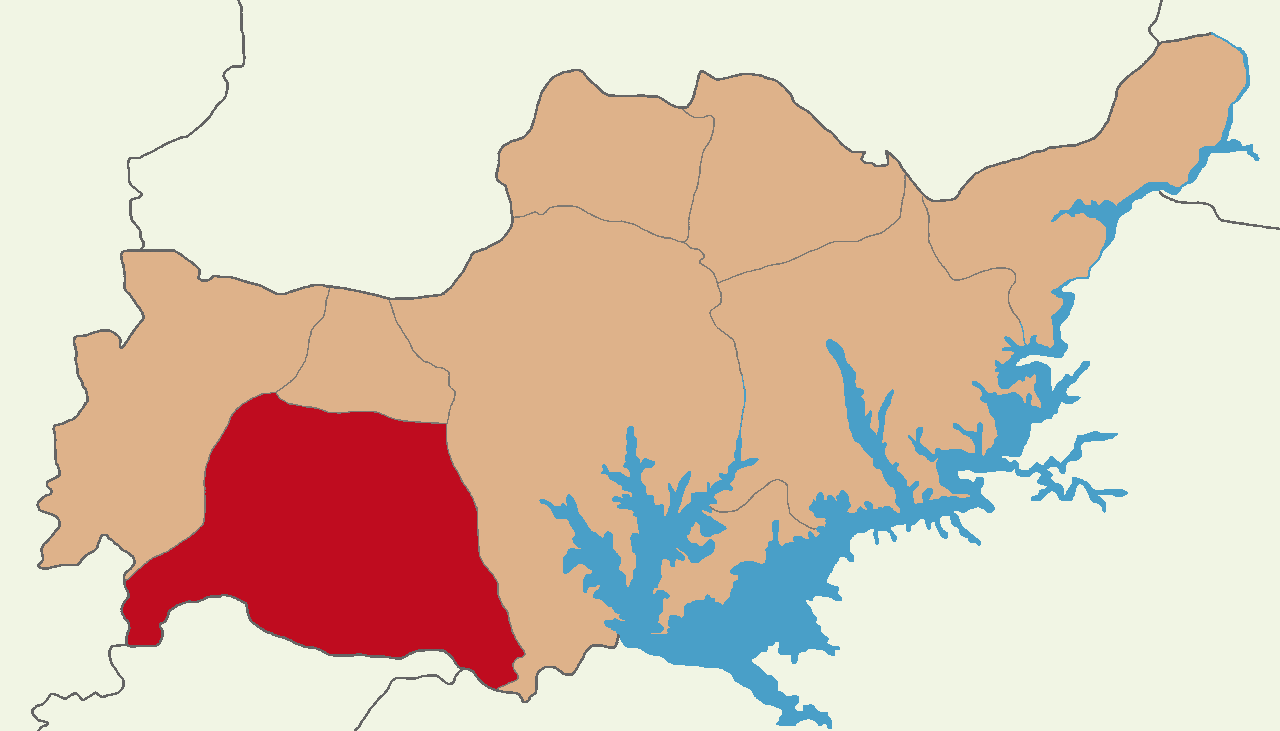
- Map showing Besni District in Adıyaman Province

- Location within Turkey
- Coordinates: 37°42′N 37°52′E
- Country: Turkey
- Province: Adıyaman
- Seat: Besni

Government
  - Kaymakam: Aytaç Akgül
- Area: 1,235 km^{2} (477 sq mi)
- Population (2021): 77,207
  - Density: 62.52/km^{2} (161.9/sq mi)
- Time zone: UTC+3 (TRT)

Besni District is a district of Adıyaman Province of Turkey. Its seat is the town of Besni. The district's area is 1,235 km^{2}, and its population was 77,207 in 2021.

== Composition ==
There are 6 municipalities in Besni District:

- Besni
- Çakırhüyük
- Kesmetepe
- Köseceli
- Şambayat
- Suvarlı

There are 67 villages in Besni District:

- Akdurak
- Akkuyu
- Akpınar
- Aktepe
- Akyazı
- Alıçlı
- Alişar
- Aşağıçöplü
- Atmalı
- Bahri
- Başlı
- Bereketli
- Berete
- Beşkoz
- Beşyol
- Boncuk
- Burunçayır
- Çamlıca
- Çamuşçu
- Çaykaya
- Çilboğaz
- Çomak
- Çorak
- Dikilitaş
- Doğankaya
- Dörtyol
- Eğerli
- Geçitli
- Gümüşlü
- Güneykaş
- Hacıhalil
- Harmanardı
- Hasanlı
- İzollu
- Karagüveç
- Karalar
- Kargalı
- Kesecik
- Kızılhisar
- Kızılin
- Kızılkaya
- Kızılpınar
- Konuklu
- Kurugöl
- Kutluca
- Kuzevleri
- Ören
- Oyratlı
- Pınarbaşı
- Sarıkaya
- Sarıyaprak
- Sayören
- Sugözü
- Taşlıyazı
- Tekağaç
- Tokar
- Toklu
- Topkapı
- Üçgöz
- Uzunkuyu
- Yayıklı
- Yazıbeydili
- Yazıkarakuyu
- Yelbastı
- Yeniköy
- Yoldüzü
- Yukarısöğütlü
