= Çataltepe =

Çataltepe (literally "fork hill") is a Turkish place name that may refer to the following places in Turkey:

- Çataltepe, Gölbaşı, a village in the district of Gölbaşı, Adıyaman Province
- Çataltepe, Kahta, a village in the district of Kahta, Adıyaman Province
- Çataltepe, Kestel
- Çataltepe, Lapseki
- Çataltepe, Manyas, a village
