= Alişar =

Alişar or Alishar or Alisar may refer to:

== People ==
- Alisar Ailabouni, Austrian fashion model

== Places ==
=== Azerbaijan ===
- Alışar, Azerbaijan, a village and municipality in the Sharur District of Nakhchivan Autonomous Republic

=== Iran ===
- Alisar, Iran, a village in Pain Taleqan Rural District of the Central District of Taleqan County, Alborz province
- Alishar Rural District, an administrative division of Zarandieh County, Markazi province

=== Turkey ===
- Alişar, Besni, a village in the district of Besni, Adıyaman Province
- Alişar Hüyük, an ancient city and archaeological site in Yozgat Province
- Alişar, Merzifon, a village in the district of Merzifon, Amasya Province
- Alişar, Sorgun, a village in the district of Sorgun, Yozgat Province
