= Dereboğazı =

Dereboğazı can refer to the following places in Turkey:

- Dereboğazı, Elâzığ
- Dereboğazı, Palandöken
