= Çamlıca, Besni =

Village in Adıyaman Province, Turkey

Çamlıca
- Village
- Location within Turkey
- Coordinates: 37.724°N 37.970°E
- Country: Turkey
- Province: Adıyaman
- District: Besni
- Population (2021): 381
- Time zone: UTC+3 (TRT)

Çamlıca is a village in the Besni District, Adıyaman Province, Turkey. Its population is 381 (2021).
