= Hacılar, Gölbaşı =

Village in Adıyaman Province, Turkey

Hacılar
- Village
- Location within Turkey
- Coordinates: 37.792°N 37.524°E
- Country: Turkey
- Province: Adıyaman
- District: Gölbaşı
- Population (2021): 182
- Time zone: UTC+3 (TRT)

Hacılar is a village in the Gölbaşı District, Adıyaman Province, Turkey. Its population is 182 (2021).
