= Aşağıkarakuyu, Gölbaşı =

Town in Adıyaman Province, Turkey

Aşağıkarakuyu
- Village
- Location within Turkey
- Coordinates: 37.648°N 37.651°E
- Country: Turkey
- Province: Adıyaman
- District: Gölbaşı
- Population (2021): 337
- Time zone: UTC+3 (TRT)

Aşağıkarakuyu (Kurdish: Hewêdî) is a village in the Gölbaşı District, Adıyaman Province, Turkey. The village is populated by Kurds of the Hevêdan tribe and had a population of 337 in 2021.
