= Yüzbey, Kalecik =

Yüzbey
- Neighbourhood
- Location in Turkey Yüzbey (Turkey Central Anatolia)
- Coordinates: 40°20′N 33°23′E
- Country: Turkey
- Province: Ankara
- District: Kalecik
- Population (2022): 61
- Time zone: UTC+3 (TRT)

Yüzbey is a neighbourhood in the municipality and district of Kalecik, Ankara Province, Turkey. Its population is 61 (2022).
