= Kargın, Kalecik =

Kargın
- Neighbourhood
- Location in Turkey Kargın (Turkey Central Anatolia)
- Coordinates: 40.2899°N 33.5515°E
- Country: Turkey
- Province: Ankara
- District: Kalecik
- Population (2022): 52
- Time zone: UTC+3 (TRT)

Kargın (also: Karkın) is a neighbourhood in the municipality and district of Kalecik, Ankara Province, Turkey. Its population is 52 (2022).
