= Sarıkaya, Besni =

Village in Adıyaman Province, Turkey

Sarıkaya
- Village
- Location within Turkey
- Coordinates: 37.536°N 38.121°E
- Country: Turkey
- Province: Adıyaman
- District: Besni
- Population (2021): 307
- Time zone: UTC+3 (TRT)

Sarıkaya is a village in the Besni District, Adıyaman Province, Turkey. Its population is 307 (2021).
