= Kösüklü, Gölbaşı =

Village in Adıyaman Province, Turkey

Kösüklü
- Village
- Location within Turkey
- Coordinates: 37.666°N 37.490°E
- Country: Turkey
- Province: Adıyaman
- District: Gölbaşı
- Population (2021): 178
- Time zone: UTC+3 (TRT)

Kösüklü (formerly Kabalar, Kurdish: Govgûr, Govgur) is a village in the Gölbaşı District, Adıyaman Province, Turkey. The village is populated by Kurds of the Atma tribe and had a population of 178 in 2021.
