= Güneykaş, Besni =

Village in Adıyaman Province, Turkey

Güneykaş
- Village
- Location within Turkey
- Coordinates: 37.752°N 37.837°E
- Country: Turkey
- Province: Adıyaman
- District: Besni
- Population (2021): 121
- Time zone: UTC+3 (TRT)

Güneykaş is a village in the Besni District, Adıyaman Province, Turkey. Its population is 121 (2021).
