= Demirtaş, Kalecik =

Demirtaş
- Neighbourhood
- Location in Turkey Demirtaş (Turkey Central Anatolia)
- Coordinates: 40.3766°N 33.3737°E
- Country: Turkey
- Province: Ankara
- District: Kalecik
- Population (2022): 197
- Time zone: UTC+3 (TRT)

Demirtaş is a neighbourhood in the municipality and district of Kalecik, Ankara Province, Turkey. Its population is 197 (2022).
