= Yukarıçöplü, Gölbaşı =

Village in Adıyaman Province, Turkey

Yukarıçöplü
- Village
- Location within Turkey
- Coordinates: 37.766°N 37.702°E
- Country: Turkey
- Province: Adıyaman
- District: Gölbaşı
- Population (2021): 238
- Time zone: UTC+3 (TRT)

Yukarıçöplü is a village in the Gölbaşı District, Adıyaman Province, Turkey. It is populated by Turks and had a population of 238 in 2021.
