= Çomak, Besni =

Village in Adıyaman Province, Turkey

Çomak
- Village
- Location within Turkey
- Coordinates: 37°31′27″N 37°59′31″E
- Country: Turkey
- Province: Adıyaman
- District: Besni
- Population (2021): 900
- Time zone: UTC+3 (TRT)

Çomak is a village in the Besni District, Adıyaman Province, Turkey. Its population is 900 (2021).

The hamlet of Hüyük is attached to the village.
