= Akpınar, Besni =

Village in Adıyaman Province, Turkey

Akpınar
- Village
- Location within Turkey
- Coordinates: 37.757°N 37.732°E
- Country: Turkey
- Province: Adıyaman
- District: Besni
- Population (2021): 340
- Time zone: UTC+3 (TRT)

Akpınar is a village in the Besni District, Adıyaman Province, Turkey. Its population is 340 (2021).

The hamlet of Aşağıburunçayır is attached to the village.
