= Yarbaşı, Gölbaşı =

Yarbaşı
- Village
- Location within Turkey
- Coordinates: 37.775°N 37.667°E
- Country: Turkey
- Province: Adıyaman
- District: Gölbaşı
- Population (2021): 494
- Time zone: UTC+3 (TRT)

Yarbaşı (Kurdish: Çelxan) is a village in the Gölbaşı District, Adıyaman Province, Turkey. The village is populated by Kurds of the Balan tribe and had a population of 494 in 2021.
