= Çorak, Besni =

Village in Adıyaman Province, Turkey

Çorak
- Village
- Location within Turkey
- Coordinates: 37.533°N 37.593°E
- Country: Turkey
- Province: Adıyaman
- District: Besni
- Population (2021): 415
- Time zone: UTC+3 (TRT)

Çorak is a village in the Besni District, Adıyaman Province, Turkey. Its population is 415 (2021).
