= Yelbastı, Besni =

Village in Adıyaman Province, Turkey

Yelbastı
- Village
- Location within Turkey
- Coordinates: 37.649°N 37.926°E
- Country: Turkey
- Province: Adıyaman
- District: Besni
- Population (2021): 64
- Time zone: UTC+3 (TRT)

Yelbastı is a village in the Besni District, Adıyaman Province, Turkey. Its population is 64 (2021).

The hamlet of Yörecik is attached to the village.
