= Akyazı, Besni =

Village in Adıyaman Province, Turkey

Akyazı
- Village
- Location within Turkey
- Coordinates: 37.517°N 38.102°E
- Country: Turkey
- Province: Adıyaman
- District: Besni
- Population (2021): 279
- Time zone: UTC+3 (TRT)

Akyazı (Kurdish: Xolxolîk) is a village in the Besni District, Adıyaman Province, Turkey. It is populated by Kurds of the Şikakî tribe and had a population of 279 in 2021.
