= Alibeyli, Kalecik =

Alibeyli
- Neighbourhood
- Location in Turkey Alibeyli (Turkey Central Anatolia)
- Coordinates: 40.1892°N 33.5672°E
- Country: Turkey
- Province: Ankara
- District: Kalecik
- Population (2022): 171
- Time zone: UTC+3 (TRT)

Alibeyli is a neighbourhood in the municipality and district of Kalecik, Ankara Province, Turkey. Its population is 171 (2022).
