= Koyunbaba, Kalecik =

Koyunbaba
- Neighbourhood
- Location in Turkey Koyunbaba (Turkey Central Anatolia)
- Coordinates: 40.3117°N 33.3213°E
- Country: Turkey
- Province: Ankara
- District: Kalecik
- Population (2022): 151
- Time zone: UTC+3 (TRT)

Koyunbaba is a neighbourhood in the municipality and district of Kalecik, Ankara Province, Turkey. Its population is 151 (2022).
