= Mahmutlar, Kalecik =

Mahmutlar
- Neighbourhood
- Location in Turkey Mahmutlar (Turkey Central Anatolia)
- Coordinates: 40.3121°N 33.5756°E
- Country: Turkey
- Province: Ankara
- District: Kalecik
- Population (2022): 180
- Time zone: UTC+3 (TRT)

Mahmutlar is a neighbourhood in the municipality and district of Kalecik, Ankara Province, Turkey. Its population is 180 (2022).
