= Konuklu, Besni =

Village in Adıyaman Province, Turkey

Konuklu
- Village
- Location within Turkey
- Coordinates: 37.598°N 37.933°E
- Country: Turkey
- Province: Adıyaman
- District: Besni
- Population (2021): 578
- Time zone: UTC+3 (TRT)

Konuklu (Kurdish: Îznik) is a village in the Besni District, Adıyaman Province, Turkey. It is populated by Kurds of the Kosan tribe and had a population of 578 in 2021.

The hamlets of Cakalı, Göndürme, İznik, Körosmanlı and Sarıçiçek are attached to the village.
