= Gökdere, Kalecik =

Gökdere
- Neighbourhood
- Location in Turkey Gökdere (Turkey Central Anatolia)
- Coordinates: 40.0622°N 33.4952°E
- Country: Turkey
- Province: Ankara
- District: Kalecik
- Population (2022): 254
- Time zone: UTC+3 (TRT)

Gökdere is a neighbourhood in the municipality and district of Kalecik, Ankara Province, Turkey. Its population is 254 (2022).
