= Yaylacık, Gölbaşı =

Village in Adıyaman Province, Turkey

Yaylacık
- Village
- Location within Turkey
- Coordinates: 37.830°N 37.811°E
- Country: Turkey
- Province: Adıyaman
- District: Gölbaşı
- Population (2021): 139
- Time zone: UTC+3 (TRT)

Yaylacık is a village in the Gölbaşı District, Adıyaman Province, Turkey. Its population is 139 (2021).
