= Tavşancık, Kalecik =

Tavşancık
- Neighbourhood
- Location in Turkey Tavşancık (Turkey Central Anatolia)
- Coordinates: 40.2805°N 33.2747°E
- Country: Turkey
- Province: Ankara
- District: Kalecik
- Population (2022): 78
- Time zone: UTC+3 (TRT)

Tavşancık is a neighbourhood in the municipality and district of Kalecik, Ankara Province, Turkey. Its population is 78 (2022).
