= Kargalı, Besni =

Village in Adıyaman Province, Turkey

Kargalı
- Village
- Location within Turkey
- Coordinates: 37.581°N 37.813°E
- Country: Turkey
- Province: Adıyaman
- District: Besni
- Population (2021): 299
- Time zone: UTC+3 (TRT)

Kargalı is a village in the Besni District, Adıyaman Province, Turkey. Its population is 299 (2021).
