= Yazıkarakuyu, Besni =

Village in Adıyaman Province, Turkey

Yazıkarakuyu
- Village
- Location within Turkey
- Coordinates: 37.559°N 38.025°E
- Country: Turkey
- Province: Adıyaman
- District: Besni
- Population (2021): 669
- Time zone: UTC+3 (TRT)

Yazıkarakuyu is a village in the Besni District, Adıyaman Province, Turkey. Its population is 669 (2021).

The hamlets of Kepirce and Yazıbademce are attached to the village.
