= Karaburun, Gölbaşı =

Village in Adıyaman Province, Turkey

Karaburun
- Village
- Location within Turkey
- Coordinates: 37.756°N 37.589°E
- Country: Turkey
- Province: Adıyaman
- District: Gölbaşı
- Population (2021): 917
- Time zone: UTC+3 (TRT)

Karaburun is a village in the Gölbaşı District, Adıyaman Province, Turkey. Its population is 917 (2021).

The hamlet of Karacaoluk is attached to the village.
