= Aşağıazaplı, Gölbaşı =

Village in Adıyaman Province, Turkey

Aşağıazaplı
- Village
- Location within Turkey
- Coordinates: 37.747°N 37.522°E
- Country: Turkey
- Province: Adıyaman
- District: Gölbaşı
- Population (2021): 383
- Time zone: UTC+3 (TRT)

Aşağıazaplı is a village in the Gölbaşı District, Adıyaman Province, Turkey. Its population is 383 (2021).

The hamlet of Örencik is attached to the village.
