= Gedikli, Gölbaşı =

Gedikli
- Village
- Location within Turkey
- Coordinates: 37.6325°N 37.6594°E
- Country: Turkey
- Province: Adıyaman
- District: Gölbaşı
- Population (2021): 595
- Time zone: UTC+3 (TRT)

Gedikli (Kurdish: Gêdûk) is a village in the Gölbaşı District, Adıyaman Province, Turkey. The village is populated by Kurds of the Hevêdan tribe and had a population of 595 in 2021.
