= Altıntaş, Kalecik =

Altıntaş
- Neighbourhood
- Location in Turkey Altıntaş (Turkey Central Anatolia)
- Coordinates: 40.2678°N 33.3850°E
- Country: Turkey
- Province: Ankara
- District: Kalecik
- Population (2022): 95
- Time zone: UTC+3 (TRT)

Altıntaş is a neighbourhood in the municipality and district of Kalecik, Ankara Province, Turkey. Its population is 95 (2022).

== Culture ==
Traditions of the Turkmen Oghuz Turks are partly alive in this village. People of this village have a patriarchal family experience.
