= Yılanlı, Kalecik =

Yılanlı
- Neighbourhood
- Location in Turkey Yılanlı (Turkey Central Anatolia)
- Coordinates: 40.2307°N 33.3058°E
- Country: Turkey
- Province: Ankara
- District: Kalecik
- Population (2022): 129
- Time zone: UTC+3 (TRT)

Yılanlı is a neighbourhood in the municipality and district of Kalecik, Ankara Province, Turkey. Its population is 129 (2022).
