= Eskiköy, Kalecik =

Eskiköy
- Neighbourhood
- Location in Turkey Eskiköy (Turkey Central Anatolia)
- Coordinates: 40.1300°N 33.3060°E
- Country: Turkey
- Province: Ankara
- District: Kalecik
- Population (2022): 245
- Time zone: UTC+3 (TRT)

Eskiköy is a neighbourhood in the municipality and district of Kalecik, Ankara Province, Turkey. Its population is 245 (2022).
