= Kuyucak, Kalecik =

Kuyucak
- Neighbourhood
- Location in Turkey Kuyucak (Turkey Central Anatolia)
- Coordinates: 40.2798°N 33.3097°E
- Country: Turkey
- Province: Ankara
- District: Kalecik
- Population (2022): 81
- Time zone: UTC+3 (TRT)

Kuyucak is a neighbourhood in the municipality and district of Kalecik, Ankara Province, Turkey. Its population is 81 (2022).
