= Dikilitaş, Besni =

Village in Adıyaman Province, Turkey

Dikilitaş
- Village
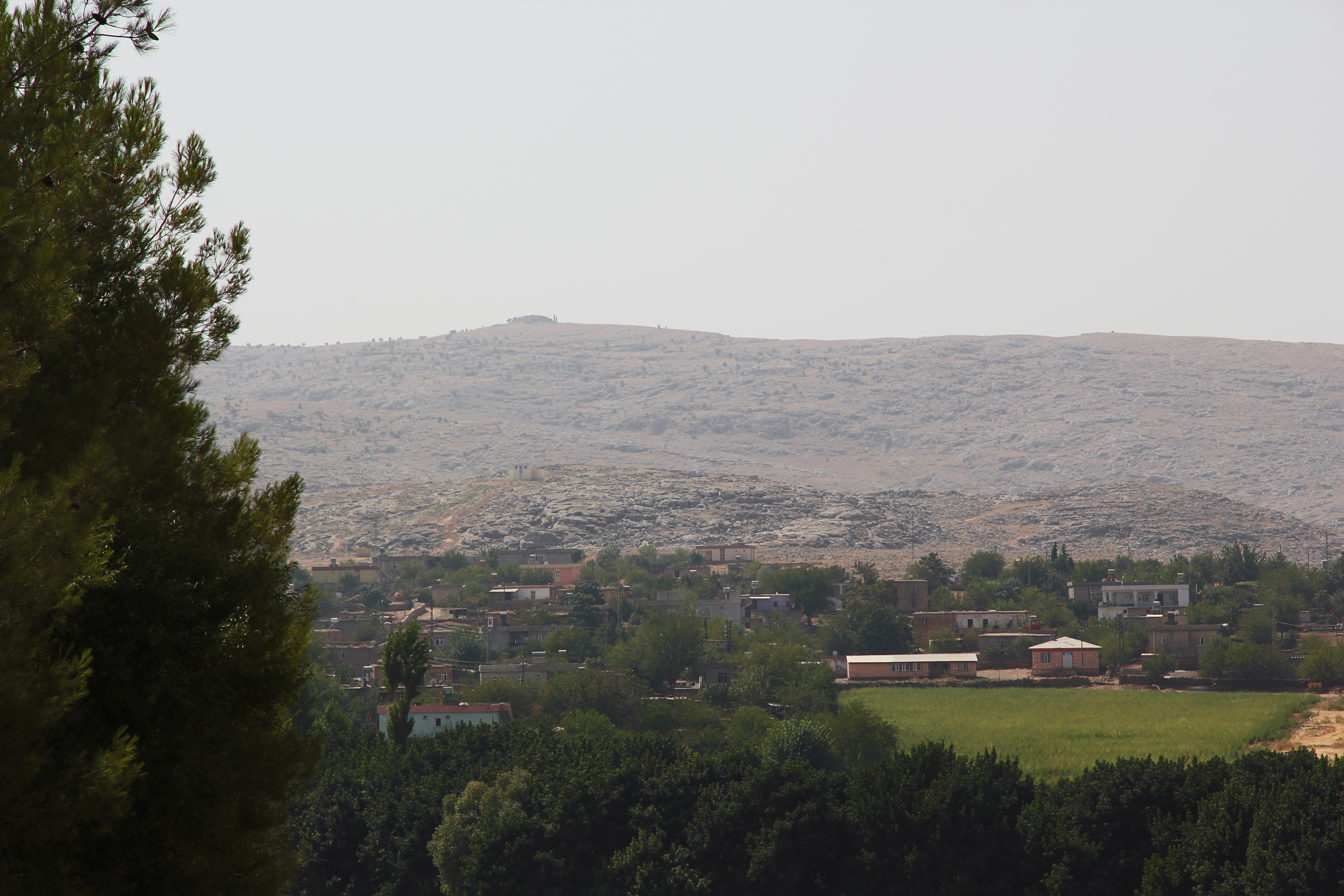

- Location within Turkey
- Coordinates: 37.505°N 38.067°E
- Country: Turkey
- Province: Adıyaman
- District: Besni
- Population (2021): 440
- Time zone: UTC+3 (TRT)

Dikilitaş is a village in the Besni District, Adıyaman Province, Turkey. Its population is 440 (2021).
