= Haydarlı, Gölbaşı =

Town in Adıyaman Province, Turkey

Haydarlı
- Village
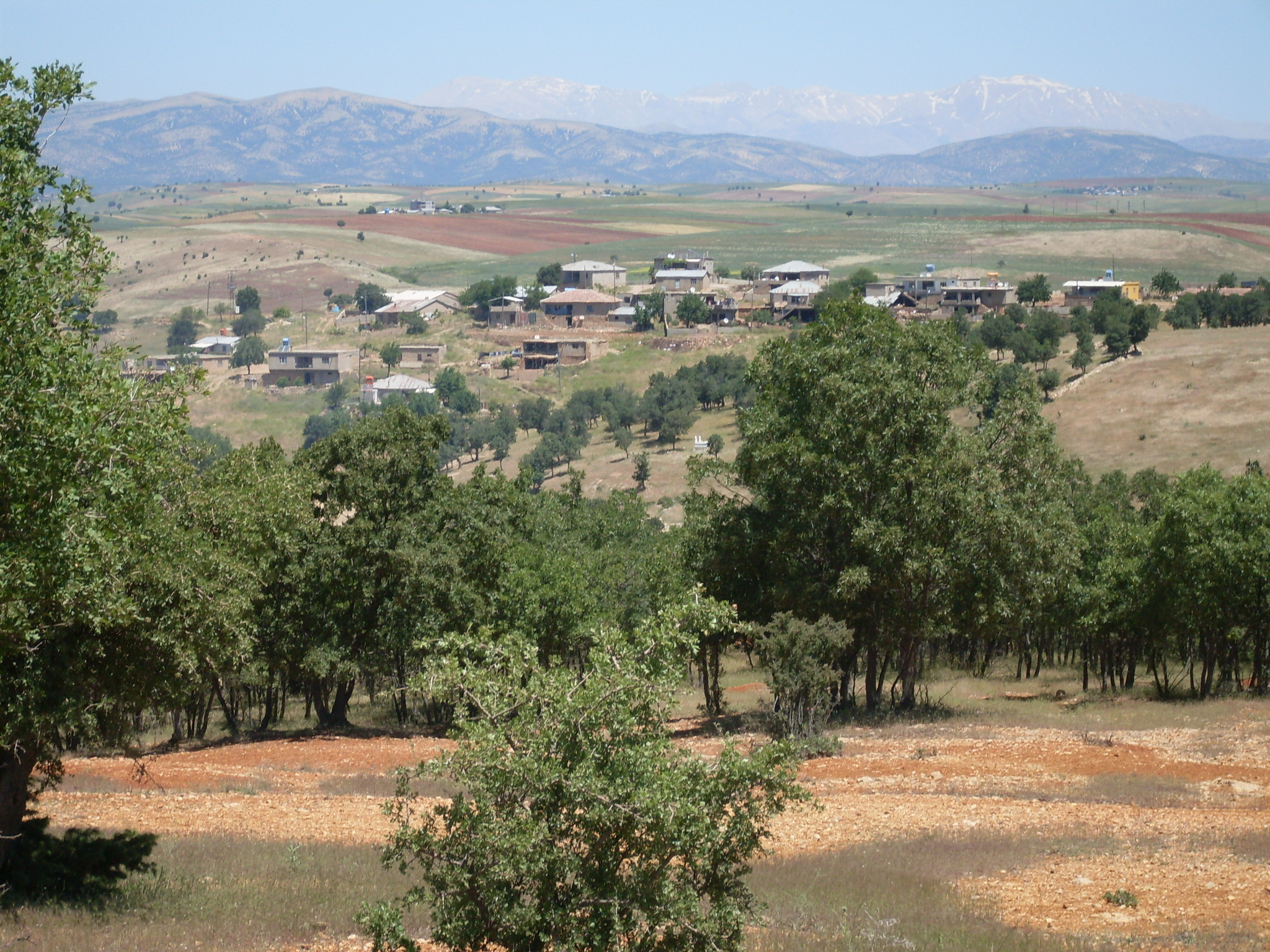

- Location within Turkey
- Coordinates: 37.595°N 37.497°E
- Country: Turkey
- Province: Adıyaman
- District: Gölbaşı
- Population (2021): 434
- Time zone: UTC+3 (TRT)

Haydarlı (Kurdish: Xalikan) is a village in the Gölbaşı District, Adıyaman Province, Turkey. The village is populated by Kurds of the Atma tribe and had a population of 434 in 2021.

The hamlets of Cerrahobası, İstasyon, Ortaoba and Sorgun are attached to the village.
