= Eğerli, Besni =

Village in Adıyaman Province, Turkey

Eğerli
- Village
- Location within Turkey
- Coordinates: 37.636°N 37.732°E
- Country: Turkey
- Province: Adıyaman
- District: Besni
- Population (2021): 613
- Time zone: UTC+3 (TRT)

Eğerli (Kurdish: Cencere) is a village in the Besni District, Adıyaman Province, Turkey. It is populated by Kurds of the Hevêdan tribe and had a population of 613 in 2021.

The hamlet of Kocapirli is attached to the village.
