= Şemsettin, Kalecik =

Şemsettin
- Neighbourhood
- Location in Turkey Şemsettin (Turkey Central Anatolia)
- Coordinates: 40°19′43″N 33°19′28″E
- Country: Turkey
- Province: Ankara
- District: Kalecik
- Population (2022): 90
- Time zone: UTC+3 (TRT)

Şemsettin is a neighbourhood in the municipality and district of Kalecik, Ankara Province, Turkey. Its population is 90 (2022).
