= Hacıhalil, Besni =

Village in Adıyaman Province, Turkey

Hacıhalil
- Village
- Location in Turkey
- Coordinates: 37.502°N 38.010°E
- Country: Turkey
- Province: Adıyaman
- District: Besni
- Population (2021): 434
- Time zone: UTC+3 (TRT)

Hacıhalil (Kurdish: Hecîxelîl) is a village in the Besni District, Adıyaman Province, Turkey. The village is populated by Kurds of the Reşwan tribe and had a population 434 in 2021.

The hamlet of Doluca is attached to the village.

== Notable people ==
- Ema Sazbend (Dengbêj singer)
