= Akkuzulu, Kalecik =

Akkuzulu
- Neighbourhood
- Location in Turkey Akkuzulu (Turkey Central Anatolia)
- Coordinates: 40.1985°N 33.5765°E
- Country: Turkey
- Province: Ankara
- District: Kalecik
- Population (2022): 129
- Time zone: UTC+3 (TRT)

Akkuzulu is a neighbourhood in the municipality and district of Kalecik, Ankara Province, Turkey. Its population is 129 (2022).
