= Ozan, Gölbaşı =

Village in Adıyaman Province, Turkey

Ozan
- Village
- Location within Turkey
- Coordinates: 37.820°N 37.678°E
- Country: Turkey
- Province: Adıyaman
- District: Gölbaşı
- Population (2021): 978
- Time zone: UTC+3 (TRT)

Ozan is a village in the Gölbaşı District, Adıyaman Province, Turkey. Its population is 978 (2021).
