= Kurugöl, Besni =

Village in Adıyaman Province, Turkey

Kurugöl
- Village
- Location within Turkey
- Coordinates: 37.644°N 37.761°E
- Country: Turkey
- Province: Adıyaman
- District: Besni
- Population (2021): 656
- Time zone: UTC+3 (TRT)

Kurugöl (Kurdish: Mamedik) is a village in the Besni District, Adıyaman Province, Turkey. The village is populated by Kurds of the Hevêdan and Kosan tribes and had a population of 656 in 2021.

The hamlet of Sumaklı Güzelevler is attached to the village.
