= Karabahşılı, Gölbaşı =

Village in Adıyaman Province, Turkey

Karabahşılı
- Village
- Location within Turkey
- Coordinates: 37.897°N 37.745°E
- Country: Turkey
- Province: Adıyaman
- District: Gölbaşı
- Population (2021): 97
- Time zone: UTC+3 (TRT)

Karabahşılı is a village in the Gölbaşı District, Adıyaman Province, Turkey. Its population is 97 (2021).

The hamlets of Arpatarlası, Çayırkom, Eskidam, İncirli, Karaçukur, Kiro, Kocameme, Köklüce and Oynatan are attached to the village.
