= Satılar, Kalecik =

Satılar
- Neighbourhood
- Location in Turkey Satılar (Turkey Central Anatolia)
- Coordinates: 40°20′N 33°27′E
- Country: Turkey
- Province: Ankara
- District: Kalecik
- Population (2022): 206
- Time zone: UTC+3 (TRT)

Satılar is a neighbourhood in the municipality and district of Kalecik, Ankara Province, Turkey. Its population is 206 (2022).
