= Gölbaşı District, Adıyaman =

Gölbaşı District
- District
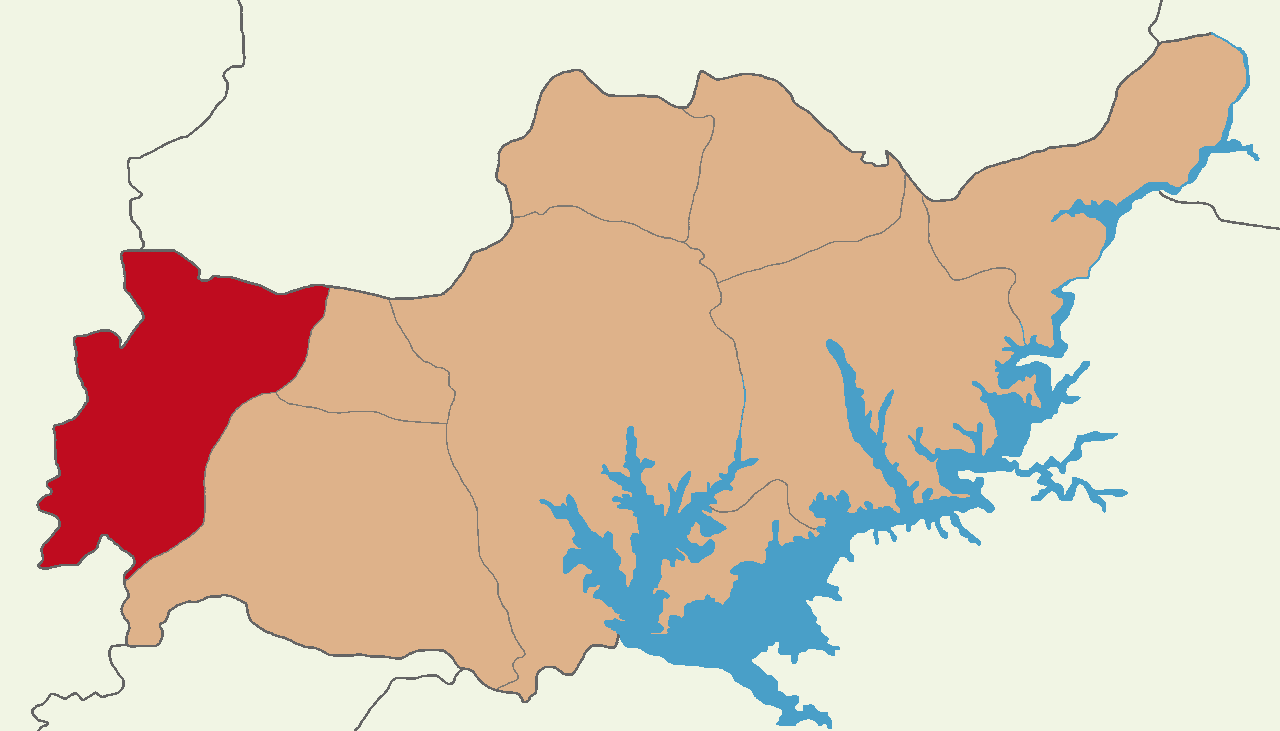
- Map showing Gölbaşı District in Adıyaman Province

- Location in Turkey
- Coordinates: 37°47′N 37°39′E
- Country: Turkey
- Province: Adıyaman
- Seat: Gölbaşı

Government
  - Kaymakam: Ihsan Ayranci
- Area: 800 km^{2} (300 sq mi)
- Population (2021): 50,150
  - Density: 63/km^{2} (160/sq mi)
- Time zone: UTC+3 (TRT)

Gölbaşı District is a district of Adıyaman Province of Turkey. Its seat is the town Gölbaşı. Its area is 800 km^{2}, and its population is 50,150 (2021). There are three lakes in the area: Lake Gölbaşı, Lake Azaplı and Lake İnekli.

The district was established in 1958.

== Geography ==
It is 62 km away from Adiyaman city center

== Composition ==
There are 4 municipalities in Gölbaşı District:

- Balkar
- Belören
- Gölbaşı
- Harmanlı

There are 30 villages in Gölbaşı District:

- Akçabel
- Akçakaya
- Aktoprak
- Aşağıazaplı
- Aşağıkarakuyu (Hewêdî)
- Aşağınasırlı
- Bağlarbaşı
- Cankara
- Çatalağaç (Dirax)
- Çataltepe
- Çelikköy
- Gedikli (Hevedi)
- Hacılar
- Hamzalar
- Haydarlı (Xalikan)
- Karabahşılı
- Karaburun
- Kösüklü (Govgûr)
- Küçükören
- Meydan
- Örenli
- Ozan
- Savran
- Yarbaşı (Çelxan)
- Yaylacık
- Yeniköy
- Yeşilova
- Yukarıçöplü
- Yukarıkarakuyu
- Yukarınasırlı
