= Hançılı, Kalecik =

Hançılı
- Neighbourhood
- Location in Turkey Hançılı (Turkey Central Anatolia)
- Coordinates: 40°23′N 33°25′E
- Country: Turkey
- Province: Ankara
- District: Kalecik
- Population (2022): 56
- Time zone: UTC+3 (TRT)

Hançılı is a neighbourhood in the municipality and district of Kalecik, Ankara Province, Turkey. Its population is 56 (2022).
