= Akdurak =

Village in Adıyaman Province, Turkey

- Village
- Location within Turkey
- Coordinates: 37.482°N 37.882°E
- Country: Turkey
- Province: Adıyaman
- District: Besni
- Population (2021): 636
- Time zone: UTC+3 (TRT)

Akdurak (Kurdish: Kosan, Komik) is a village in the Besni District, Adıyaman Province, Turkey. The village is populated by Kurds of the Kosan tribe and had a population of 636 in 2021.

The hamlets of Çakmak, Dağdibi, Güvercin, Kömkışla, Kurugöl and Türünkışla are attached to Akdurak.
