= Çiftlikköy, Kalecik =

Çiftlikköy
- Neighbourhood
- Location in Turkey Çiftlikköy (Turkey Central Anatolia)
- Coordinates: 40.1595°N 33.3358°E
- Country: Turkey
- Province: Ankara
- District: Kalecik
- Population (2022): 165
- Time zone: UTC+3 (TRT)

Çiftlikköy is a neighbourhood in the municipality and district of Kalecik, Ankara Province, Turkey. Its population is 165 (2022).
