= Akçakaya, Gölbaşı =

Village in Adıyaman Province, Turkey

Akçakaya
- Village
- Location within Turkey
- Coordinates: 37.793°N 37.690°E
- Country: Turkey
- Province: Adıyaman
- District: Gölbaşı
- Population (2021): 155
- Time zone: UTC+3 (TRT)

Akçakaya is a village in the Gölbaşı District, Adıyaman Province, Turkey. Its population is 155 (2021).
