= Örenli, Gölbaşı =

Village in Adıyaman Province, Turkey

Örenli
- Village
- Location within Turkey
- Coordinates: 37.748°N 37.634°E
- Country: Turkey
- Province: Adıyaman
- District: Gölbaşı
- Population (2021): 81
- Time zone: UTC+3 (TRT)

Örenli is a village in the Gölbaşı District, Adıyaman Province, Turkey. Its population is 81 (2021).
