= Yeşilova, Gölbaşı =

Village in Adıyaman Province, Turkey

Yeşilova
- Village
- Location within Turkey
- Coordinates: 37.720°N 37.478°E
- Country: Turkey
- Province: Adıyaman
- District: Gölbaşı
- Population (2021): 571
- Time zone: UTC+3 (TRT)

Yeşilova is a village in the Gölbaşı District, Adıyaman Province, Turkey. Its population is 571 (2021).
