= Alıçlı, Besni =

Village in Adıyaman Province, Turkey

Alıçlı
- Village
- Location within Turkey
- Coordinates: 37.507°N 37.790°E
- Country: Turkey
- Province: Adıyaman
- District: Besni
- Population (2021): 116
- Time zone: UTC+3 (TRT)

Alıçlı is a village in the Besni District, Adıyaman Province, Turkey. Its population was 116 in 2021.
