= Aşağıçöplü, Besni =

Village in Adıyaman Province, Turkey

Aşağıçöplü
- Village
- Location within Turkey
- Coordinates: 37.742°N 37.875°E
- Country: Turkey
- Province: Adıyaman
- District: Besni
- Population (2021): 173
- Time zone: UTC+3 (TRT)

Aşağıçöplü is a village in the Besni District, Adıyaman Province, Turkey. Its population is 173 (2021).
