= Beykavağı, Kalecik =

Beykavağı
- Neighbourhood
- Location in Turkey Beykavağı (Turkey Central Anatolia)
- Coordinates: 40°20′N 33°21′E
- Country: Turkey
- Province: Ankara
- District: Kalecik
- Population (2022): 115
- Time zone: UTC+3 (TRT)

Beykavağı is a neighbourhood in the municipality and district of Kalecik, Ankara Province, Turkey. Its population is 115 (2022).
