= Burunçayır, Besni =

Village in Adıyaman Province, Turkey

Burunçayır
- Village
- Location within Turkey
- Coordinates: 37.750°N 37.796°E
- Country: Turkey
- Province: Adıyaman
- District: Besni
- Population (2021): 513
- Time zone: UTC+3 (TRT)

Burunçayır is a village in the Besni District, Adıyaman Province, Turkey. Its population is 513 (2021).
