= Yayıklı, Besni =

Village in Adıyaman Province, Turkey

Yayıklı
- Village
- Location within Turkey
- Coordinates: 37.586°N 37.709°E
- Country: Turkey
- Province: Adıyaman
- District: Besni
- Population (2021): 582
- Time zone: UTC+3 (TRT)

Yayıklı (Kurdish: Zirce) is a village in the Besni District, Adıyaman Province, Turkey. The village is populated by Kurds of the Hevêdan tribe and had a population of 582 in 2021.
