= Karatepe, Kalecik =

Karatepe
- Neighbourhood
- Location in Turkey Karatepe (Turkey Central Anatolia)
- Coordinates: 40.3444°N 33.3957°E
- Country: Turkey
- Province: Ankara
- District: Kalecik
- Population (2022): 38
- Time zone: UTC+3 (TRT)

Karatepe is a neighbourhood in the municipality and district of Kalecik, Ankara Province, Turkey. Its population is 38 (2022).
