= Gümüşpınar, Kalecik =

Gümüşpınar
- Neighbourhood
- Location in Turkey Gümüşpınar (Turkey Central Anatolia)
- Coordinates: 40.1208°N 33.4550°E
- Country: Turkey
- Province: Ankara
- District: Kalecik
- Population (2022): 120
- Time zone: UTC+3 (TRT)

Gümüşpınar is a neighbourhood in the municipality and district of Kalecik, Ankara Province, Turkey. Its population is 120 (2022).
