= Geçitli, Besni =

Village in Adıyaman Province, Turkey

Geçitli
- Village
- Location within Turkey
- Coordinates: 37.563°N 38.058°E
- Country: Turkey
- Province: Adıyaman
- District: Besni
- Population (2021): 242
- Time zone: UTC+3 (TRT)

Geçitli is a village in the Besni District, Adıyaman Province, Turkey. Its population is 242 (2021).
