= Karahöyük, Kalecik =

Karahöyük
- Neighbourhood
- Location in Turkey Karahöyük (Turkey Central Anatolia)
- Coordinates: 40.1963°N 33.3370°E
- Country: Turkey
- Province: Ankara
- District: Kalecik
- Population (2022): 238
- Time zone: UTC+3 (TRT)

Karahöyük is a neighbourhood in the municipality and district of Kalecik, Ankara Province, Turkey. Its population is 238 (2022).
