= Akçabel, Gölbaşı =

Village in Adıyaman Province, Turkey

Akçabel
- Village
- Location within Turkey
- Coordinates: 37.8010°N 37.803°E
- Country: Turkey
- Province: Adıyaman
- District: Gölbaşı
- Population (2021): 518
- Time zone: UTC+3 (TRT)

Akçabel is a village in the Gölbaşı District, Adıyaman Province, Turkey. Its population is 518 (2021).
