= Yukarıkarakuyu, Gölbaşı =

Village in Adıyaman Province, Turkey

Yukarıkarakuyu
- Village
- Location within Turkey
- Coordinates: 37.701°N 37.653°E
- Country: Turkey
- Province: Adıyaman
- District: Gölbaşı
- Population (2021): 378
- Time zone: UTC+3 (TRT)

Yukarıkarakuyu (Kurdish: Hevêd) is a village in the Gölbaşı District, Adıyaman Province, Turkey. It is populated by Kurds of the Hevêdan tribe and had a population of 378 in 2021.
