= Kızılin, Besni =

Village in Adıyaman Province, Turkey

Kızılin
- Village
- Location within Turkey
- Coordinates: 37°25′44″N 38°07′30″E
- Country: Turkey
- Province: Adıyaman
- District: Besni
- Population (2021): 675
- Time zone: UTC+3 (TRT)

Kızılin is a village in the Besni District, Adıyaman Province, Turkey. As of 2021, Its population was 675.
