= Kızılhisar, Besni =

Village in Adıyaman Province, Turkey

Kızılhisar
- Village
- Location within Turkey
- Coordinates: 37.727°N 37.902°E
- Country: Turkey
- Province: Adıyaman
- District: Besni
- Population (2021): 101
- Time zone: UTC+3 (TRT)

Kızılhisar is a village in the Besni District, Adıyaman Province, Turkey. Its population is 101 (2021).
