= Boncuk, Besni =

Village in Adıyaman Province, Turkey

Boncuk
- Village
- Location within Turkey
- Coordinates: 37.640°N 37.797°E
- Country: Turkey
- Province: Adıyaman
- District: Besni
- Population (2021): 136
- Time zone: UTC+3 (TRT)

Boncuk (Kurdish: Binçûg) is a village in the Besni District, Adıyaman Province, Turkey. The village is populated by Kurds of the Hevêdan tribe and had a population of 136 in 2021.
