= Gölköy, Kalecik =

Gölköy
- Neighbourhood
- Location in Turkey Gölköy (Turkey Central Anatolia)
- Coordinates: 40.0835°N 33.3387°E
- Country: Turkey
- Province: Ankara
- District: Kalecik
- Population (2022): 215
- Time zone: UTC+3 (TRT)

Gölköy is a neighbourhood in the municipality and district of Kalecik, Ankara Province, Turkey. Its population is 215 (2022).
