= Hasayaz, Kalecik =

Hasayaz
- Neighbourhood
- Location in Turkey Hasayaz (Turkey Central Anatolia)
- Coordinates: 40°14′N 33°20′E
- Country: Turkey
- Province: Ankara
- District: Kalecik
- Population (2022): 149
- Time zone: UTC+3 (TRT)

Hasayaz is a neighbourhood in the municipality and district of Kalecik, Ankara Province, Turkey. Its population is 149 (2022).
