= Bağlarbaşı, Gölbaşı =

Village in Adıyaman Province, Turkey

Bağlarbaşı
- Village
- Location within Turkey
- Coordinates: 37.760°N 37.548°E
- Country: Turkey
- Province: Adıyaman
- District: Gölbaşı
- Population (2021): 100
- Time zone: UTC+3 (TRT)

Bağlarbaşı is a village in the Gölbaşı District, Adıyaman Province, Turkey. Its population is 100 (2021).

The hamlet of Uğurlu is attached to the village.

== Notable people ==
- Father Samuel (born 1942), Syriac Orthodox monk-priest
