= Yeşilöz, Kalecik =

Yeşilöz
- Neighbourhood
- Location in Turkey Yeşilöz (Turkey Central Anatolia)
- Coordinates: 40.2648°N 33.3313°E
- Country: Turkey
- Province: Ankara
- District: Kalecik
- Population (2022): 63
- Time zone: UTC+3 (TRT)

Yeşilöz is a neighbourhood in the municipality and district of Kalecik, Ankara Province, Turkey. Its population is 63 (2022).
