= Yazıbeydili =

Village in Adıyaman Province, Turkey

- Village
- Location within Turkey
- Coordinates: 37.541°N 37.957°E
- Country: Turkey
- Province: Adıyaman
- District: Besni
- Population (2021): 374
- Time zone: UTC+3 (TRT)

Yazıbeydili is a village in the Besni District, Adıyaman Province, Turkey. Its population is 374 (2021).

The hamlets of Karakuş and Obalı are attached to the village.
