= Karalar, Kalecik =

Karalar
- Neighbourhood
- Location in Turkey Karalar (Turkey Central Anatolia)
- Coordinates: 40°06′35″N 33°33′35″E
- Country: Turkey
- Province: Ankara
- District: Kalecik
- Population (2022): 67
- Time zone: UTC+3 (TRT)

Karalar is a neighbourhood in the municipality and district of Kalecik, Ankara Province, Turkey. Its population is 67 (2022).
