= Elmapınar, Kalecik =

Elmapınar
- Neighbourhood
- Location in Turkey Elmapınar (Turkey Central Anatolia)
- Coordinates: 40.3363°N 33.5559°E
- Country: Turkey
- Province: Ankara
- District: Kalecik
- Population (2022): 89
- Time zone: UTC+3 (TRT)

Elmapınar is a neighbourhood in the municipality and district of Kalecik, Ankara Province, Turkey. Its population is 89 (2022).
