= Savran, Gölbaşı =

Village in Adıyaman Province, Turkey

Savran
- Village
- Location within Turkey
- Coordinates: 37.806°N 37.537°E
- Country: Turkey
- Province: Adıyaman
- District: Gölbaşı
- Population (2021): 550
- Time zone: UTC+3 (TRT)

Savran is a village in the Gölbaşı District, Adıyaman Province, Turkey. Its population is 550 (2021).

The hamlets of Otluk and Tepelik are attached to the village.
