= Yukarıyenice, Palandöken =

Village in Turkey

Yukarıyenice
- Neighbourhood
- Location in Turkey
- Coordinates: 39°51′54″N 40°59′24″E
- Country: Turkey
- Province: Erzurum
- District: Palandöken
- Population (2022): 141
- Time zone: UTC+3 (TRT)

Yukarıyenice is a neighbourhood in the municipality and district of Palandöken, Erzurum Province in Turkey. Its population is 141 (2022).
