= Gümüşlü, Besni =

Village in Adıyaman Province, Turkey

Gümüşlü
- Village
- Location within Turkey
- Coordinates: 37.654°N 38.080°E
- Country: Turkey
- Province: Adıyaman
- District: Besni
- Population (2021): 50
- Time zone: UTC+3 (TRT)

Gümüşlü (Kurdish: Beşerî) is a village in the Besni District, Adıyaman Province, Turkey. The village is populated by Kurds of the Reşwan tribe and had a population of 50 in 2021.
