= Hacıköy, Kalecik =

Hacıköy
- Neighbourhood
- Location in Turkey Hacıköy (Turkey Central Anatolia)
- Coordinates: 40.2000°N 33.4167°E
- Country: Turkey
- Province: Ankara
- District: Kalecik
- Population (2022): 236
- Time zone: UTC+3 (TRT)

Hacıköy is a village in the municipality and district of Kalecik, Ankara Province, Turkey. Its population is 236 (2022).
