= Kuzevleri, Besni =

Village in Adıyaman Province, Turkey

Kuzevleri
- Village
- Location within Turkey
- Coordinates: 37.751°N 37.694°E
- Country: Turkey
- Province: Adıyaman
- District: Besni
- Population (2021): 65
- Time zone: UTC+3 (TRT)

Kuzevleri (Kurdish: Dîpevler) is a village in the Besni District, Adıyaman Province, Turkey. It is populated by Kurds of the Hevêdan tribe and had a population of 65 in 2021.
