= Aktoprak, Gölbaşı =

Village in Adıyaman Province, Turkey

Aktoprak
- Village
- Location within Turkey
- Coordinates: 37.847°N 37.692°E
- Country: Turkey
- Province: Adıyaman
- District: Gölbaşı
- Population (2021): 125
- Time zone: UTC+3 (TRT)

Aktoprak is a village in the Gölbaşı District, Adıyaman Province, Turkey. Its population is 125 (2021).

The hamlet of Kumluisdasyon is attached to the village.
