= Meydan, Gölbaşı =

Village in Adıyaman Province, Turkey

Meydan
- Village
- Location within Turkey
- Coordinates: 37.875°N 37.642°E
- Country: Turkey
- Province: Adıyaman
- District: Gölbaşı
- Population (2021): 372
- Time zone: UTC+3 (TRT)

Meydan is a village in the Gölbaşı District, Adıyaman Province, Turkey. Its population is 372 (2021).
