= Tekağaç, Besni =

Village in Adıyaman Province, Turkey

Tekağaç
- Village
- Location within Turkey
- Coordinates: 37.627°N 38.047°E
- Country: Turkey
- Province: Adıyaman
- District: Besni
- Population (2021): 289
- Time zone: UTC+3 (TRT)

Tekağaç (Kurdish: Kotur) is a village in the Besni District, Adıyaman Province, Turkey. The village is populated by Kurds of the Reşwan tribe and had a population of 289 in 2021.

The hamlets of Beşir, Bostancık and Yazıyalankoz are attached to the village.
