= Yoldüzü, Besni =

Village in Adıyaman Province, Turkey

Yoldüzü
- Village
- Location within Turkey
- Coordinates: 37.585°N 37.906°E
- Country: Turkey
- Province: Adıyaman
- District: Besni
- Population (2021): 511
- Time zone: UTC+3 (TRT)

Yoldüzü (Kurdish: Mirixtil) is a village in the Besni District, Adıyaman Province, Turkey. The village is populated by Kurds and had a population of 511 in 2021.
