= Sarıyaprak, Besni =

Village in Adıyaman Province, Turkey

Sarıyaprak
- Village
- Location within Turkey
- Coordinates: 37.588°N 37.734°E
- Country: Turkey
- Province: Adıyaman
- District: Besni
- Population (2021): 676
- Time zone: UTC+3 (TRT)

Sarıyaprak (Kurdish: Şeyînan) is a village in the Besni District, Adıyaman Province, Turkey. The village is populated by Kurds of the Hevêdan tribe and had a population of 676 in 2021. Before the 2013 reorganisation, it was a town (belde).
