= Oyratlı, Besni =

Village in Adıyaman Province, Turkey

Oyratlı
- Village
- Location within Turkey
- Coordinates: 37.631°N 37.843°E
- Country: Turkey
- Province: Adıyaman
- District: Besni
- Population (2021): 1,399
- Time zone: UTC+3 (TRT)

Oyratlı (Kurdish: Xoyratli) is a village in the Besni District, Adıyaman Province, Turkey. It is populated by Kurds of the Hevêdan tribe and has a population of 1,399 in 2021.

The hamlet of Satıluşağı is attached to the village.
