= Dörtyol, Besni =

Village in Adıyaman Province, Turkey

Dörtyol
- Village
- Location within Turkey
- Coordinates: 37.589°N 38.068°E
- Country: Turkey
- Province: Adıyaman
- District: Besni
- Population (2021): 269
- Time zone: UTC+3 (TRT)

Dörtyol or Karagöcek is a village in the Besni District, Adıyaman Province, Turkey. The village is populated by Kurds of the Şikakî tribe and had a population of 269 in 2021.
