= Afşar, Kalecik =

Afşar
- Neighbourhood
- Location in Turkey Afşar (Turkey Central Anatolia)
- Coordinates: 40.28013°N 33.50714°E
- Country: Turkey
- Province: Ankara
- District: Kalecik
- Population (2022): 109
- Time zone: UTC+3 (TRT)

Afşar is a neighbourhood in the municipality and district of Kalecik, Ankara Province, Turkey. Its population is 109 (2022).
