= Cankara, Gölbaşı =

Village in Adıyaman Province, Turkey

Cankara
- Village
- Location within Turkey
- Coordinates: 37.870°N 37.836°E
- Country: Turkey
- Province: Adıyaman
- District: Gölbaşı
- Population (2021): 96
- Time zone: UTC+3 (TRT)

Cankara is a village in the Gölbaşı District, Adıyaman Province, Turkey. Its population is 96 (2021).
