= Yeniköy, Besni =

Village in Adıyaman Province, Turkey

Yeniköy
- Village
- Location within Turkey
- Coordinates: 37.503°N 38.044°E
- Country: Turkey
- Province: Adıyaman
- District: Besni
- Population (2021): 463
- Time zone: UTC+3 (TRT)

Yeniköy is a village in the Besni District, Adıyaman Province, Turkey. Its population is 463 (2021).

The hamlets of Aşağı Erler, Yukarı Erler and Zonmağara are attached to the village.
