= Buğra, Kalecik =

Buğra
- Neighbourhood
- Location in Turkey Buğra (Turkey Central Anatolia)
- Coordinates: 40°10′N 33°34′E
- Country: Turkey
- Province: Ankara
- District: Kalecik
- Population (2022): 138
- Time zone: UTC+3 (TRT)

Buğra is a neighbourhood in the municipality and district of Kalecik, Ankara Province, Turkey. Its population is 138 (2022).
