= Yurtyenice, Kalecik =

Yurtyenice
- Neighbourhood
- Location in Turkey Yurtyenice (Turkey Central Anatolia)
- Coordinates: 40°21′N 33°26′E
- Country: Turkey
- Province: Ankara
- District: Kalecik
- Population (2022): 130
- Time zone: UTC+3 (TRT)

Yurtyenice is a neighbourhood in the municipality and district of Kalecik, Ankara Province, Turkey. Its population is 130 (2022).
