= Pınarbaşı, Besni =

Village in Adıyaman Province, Turkey

Pınarbaşı
- Village
- Location within Turkey
- Coordinates: 37.571°N 37.652°E
- Country: Turkey
- Province: Adıyaman
- District: Besni
- Population (2021): 329
- Time zone: UTC+3 (TRT)

Pınarbaşı (Kurdish: Kîlsecik, Mezraya Kortîyan) is a village in the Besni District, Adıyaman Province, Turkey. It is populated by Kurds of the Hevêdan tribe and had a population of 329 in 2021.

The hamlets of Dutlupınar and Oğulcuk are attached to the village.
