= Akcataş, Kalecik =

Akcataş
- Neighbourhood
- Location in Turkey Akcataş (Turkey Central Anatolia)
- Coordinates: 40.2019°N 33.3024°E
- Country: Turkey
- Province: Ankara
- District: Kalecik
- Population (2022): 70
- Time zone: UTC+3 (TRT)

Akcataş is a neighbourhood in the municipality and district of Kalecik, Ankara Province, Turkey. Its population is 70 (2022).
