= Beşkoz, Besni =

Village in Adıyaman Province, Turkey

Beşkoz
- Village
- Location within Turkey
- Coordinates: 37.731°N 37.770°E
- Country: Turkey
- Province: Adıyaman
- District: Besni
- Population (2021): 45
- Time zone: UTC+3 (TRT)

Beşkoz is a village in the Besni District, Adıyaman Province, Turkey. Its population is 45 (2021).
