= Taşlıyazı, Besni =

Village in Adıyaman Province, Turkey

Taşlıyazı
- Village
- Location within Turkey
- Coordinates: 37.718°N 37.949°E
- Country: Turkey
- Province: Adıyaman
- District: Besni
- Population (2021): 220
- Time zone: UTC+3 (TRT)

Taşlıyazı is a village in the Besni District, Adıyaman Province, Turkey. Its population is 220 (2021).
