= Sayören, Besni =

Village in Adıyaman Province, Turkey

Sayören
- Village
- Location within Turkey
- Coordinates: 37.487°N 38.152°E
- Country: Turkey
- Province: Adıyaman
- District: Besni
- Population (2021): 1,518
- Time zone: UTC+3 (TRT)

Sayören is a village in the Besni District, Adıyaman Province, Turkey. Its population is 1,518 (2021).
