= Çandır, Kalecik =

Çandır
- Neighbourhood
- Location in Turkey Çandır (Turkey Central Anatolia)
- Coordinates: 40.2572°N 33.4687°E
- Country: Turkey
- Province: Ankara
- District: Kalecik
- Population (2022): 301
- Time zone: UTC+3 (TRT)

Çandır is a neighbourhood in the municipality and district of Kalecik, Ankara Province, Turkey. Its population is 301 (2022).
