= Kılçak, Kalecik =

Kılçak
- Neighbourhood
- Location in Turkey Kılçak (Turkey Central Anatolia)
- Coordinates: 40.2158°N 33.4138°E
- Country: Turkey
- Province: Ankara
- District: Kalecik
- Population (2022): 208
- Time zone: UTC+3 (TRT)

Kılçak is a neighbourhood in the municipality and district of Kalecik, Ankara Province, Turkey. Its population is 208 (2022).
