= Aşağınasırlı, Gölbaşı =

Village in Adıyaman Province, Turkey

Aşağınasırlı
- Village
- Location within Turkey
- Coordinates: 37.621°N 37.636°E
- Country: Turkey
- Province: Adıyaman
- District: Gölbaşı
- Population (2021): 448
- Time zone: UTC+3 (TRT)

Aşağınasırlı is a village in the Gölbaşı District, Adıyaman Province, Turkey. Its population is 448 (2021).
