= Şeyhmahmut, Kalecik =

Şeyhmahmut
- Neighbourhood
- Location in Turkey Şeyhmahmut (Turkey Central Anatolia)
- Coordinates: 40.1000°N 33.3333°E
- Country: Turkey
- Province: Ankara
- District: Kalecik
- Population (2022): 12
- Time zone: UTC+3 (TRT)

Şeyhmahmut is a neighbourhood in the municipality and district of Kalecik, Ankara Province, Turkey. Its population is 12 (2022).
