= Yukarınasırlı, Gölbaşı =

Town in Adıyaman Province, Turkey

Yukarınasırlı
- Village
- Location within Turkey
- Coordinates: 37.653°N 37.608°E
- Country: Turkey
- Province: Adıyaman
- District: Gölbaşı
- Population (2021): 843
- Time zone: UTC+3 (TRT)

Yukarınasırlı is a village in the Gölbaşı District, Adıyaman Province, Turkey. The village is populated by Turks and had a population of 843 in 2021. Both Alevis and Sunni Muslims are present in the village.
