= Ören, Besni =

Village in Adıyaman Province, Turkey

Ören
- Village
- Location within Turkey
- Coordinates: 37.468°N 38.112°E
- Country: Turkey
- Province: Adıyaman
- District: Besni
- Population (2021): 437
- Time zone: UTC+3 (TRT)

Ören is a village in the Besni District, Adıyaman Province, Turkey. Its population is 437 (2021).

The hamlet of Yeşilova is attached to the village.
