= Arkbürk, Kalecik =

Arkbürk
- Neighbourhood
- Location in Turkey Arkbürk (Turkey Central Anatolia)
- Coordinates: 40°08′N 33°23′E
- Country: Turkey
- Province: Ankara
- District: Kalecik
- Population (2022): 98
- Time zone: UTC+3 (TRT)

Arkbürk is a neighbourhood in the municipality and district of Kalecik, Ankara Province, Turkey. Its population is 98 (2022).
