= Karagüveç, Besni =

Village in Adıyaman Province, Turkey

Karagüveç
- Village
- Location within Turkey
- Coordinates: 37.608°N 37.756°E
- Country: Turkey
- Province: Adıyaman
- District: Besni
- Population (2021): 640
- Time zone: UTC+3 (TRT)

Karagüveç (Kurdish: Kitiş) is a village in the Besni District, Adıyaman Province, Turkey. The village is populated by Kurds of the Hevêdan tribe and had a population of 640 in 2021.
