= Küçükören, Gölbaşı =

Village in Adıyaman Province, Turkey

Küçükören
- Village
- Location within Turkey
- Coordinates: 37.643°N 37.453°E
- Country: Turkey
- Province: Adıyaman
- District: Gölbaşı
- Population (2021): 192
- Time zone: UTC+3 (TRT)

Küçükören is a village in the Gölbaşı District, Adıyaman Province, Turkey. Its population is 192 (2021).

The hamlet of Söğütlü is attached to the village.
