= Uyurca, Kalecik =

Uyurca
- Neighbourhood
- Location in Turkey Uyurca (Turkey Central Anatolia)
- Coordinates: 40°15′N 33°35′E
- Country: Turkey
- Province: Ankara
- District: Kalecik
- Population (2022): 59
- Time zone: UTC+3 (TRT)

Uyurca is a neighbourhood in the municipality and district of Kalecik, Ankara Province, Turkey. Its population is 59 (2022).
