= Atmalı, Besni =

Village in Adıyaman Province, Turkey

Atmalı
- Village
- Location within Turkey
- Coordinates: 37.707°N 37.981°E
- Country: Turkey
- Province: Adıyaman
- District: Besni
- Population (2021): 1,692
- Time zone: UTC+3 (TRT)

Atmalı (Kurdish: Atma) is a village in the Besni District, Adıyaman Province, Turkey. The village is populated by Kurds of the Karalos tribe and had a population of 1,692 in 2021.

The hamlet of Akkuyu is attached to the village.
