= Yeniköy, Gölbaşı =

Village in Adıyaman Province, Turkey

Yeniköy
- Village
- Location within Turkey
- Coordinates: 37.613°N 37.489°E
- Country: Turkey
- Province: Adıyaman
- District: Gölbaşı
- Population (2021): 246
- Time zone: UTC+3 (TRT)

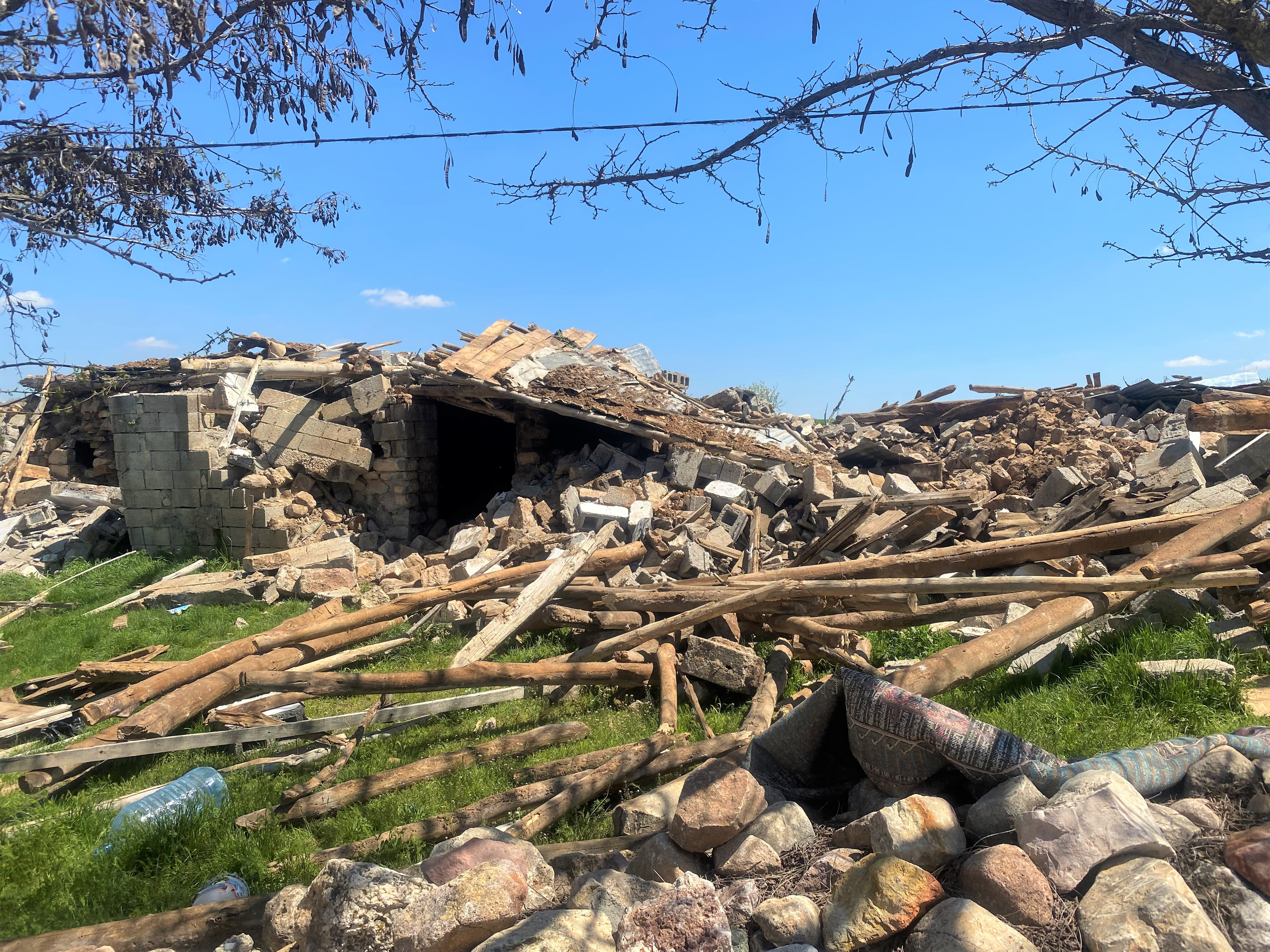

Yeniköy is a village in the Gölbaşı District, Adıyaman Province, Turkey. Its population is 246 (2021).
