= Keklicek, Kalecik =

Keklicek
- Neighbourhood
- Location in Turkey Keklicek (Turkey Central Anatolia)
- Coordinates: 40.1831°N 33.4031°E
- Country: Turkey
- Province: Ankara
- District: Kalecik
- Population (2022): 43
- Time zone: UTC+3 (TRT)

Keklicek is a neighbourhood in the municipality and district of Kalecik, Ankara Province, Turkey. Its population is 43 (2022).
