= Hamzalar, Gölbaşı =

Village in Adıyaman Province, Turkey

Hamzalar
- Village
- Location within Turkey
- Coordinates: 37.919°N 37.669°E
- Country: Turkey
- Province: Adıyaman
- District: Gölbaşı
- Population (2021): 427
- Time zone: UTC+3 (TRT)

Hamzalar is a village in the Gölbaşı District, Adıyaman Province, Turkey. Its population is 427 (2021).

The hamlets of Hasanlar, Sırıklı and Sütlüce are attached to Hamzalar.
