= Dağdemir, Kalecik =

Dağdemir
- Neighbourhood
- Location in Turkey Dağdemir (Turkey Central Anatolia)
- Coordinates: 40°14′N 33°26′E
- Country: Turkey
- Province: Ankara
- District: Kalecik
- Population (2022): 78
- Time zone: UTC+3 (TRT)

Dağdemir is a neighbourhood in the municipality and district of Kalecik, Ankara Province, Turkey. Its population is 78 (2022).
