= Kutluca, Besni =

Village in Adıyaman Province, Turkey

Kutluca
- Village
- Location within Turkey
- Coordinates: 37.592°N 37.978°E
- Country: Turkey
- Province: Adıyaman
- District: Besni
- Population (2021): 1,018
- Time zone: UTC+3 (TRT)

Kutluca is a village in the Besni District, Adıyaman Province, Turkey. Its population is 1,018 (2021).

The hamlet of Karnacık is attached to the village.
