= Yeniçöte, Kalecik =

Yeniçöte
- Neighbourhood
- Location in Turkey Yeniçöte (Turkey Central Anatolia)
- Coordinates: 40°14′N 33°15′E
- Country: Turkey
- Province: Ankara
- District: Kalecik
- Population (2022): 228
- Time zone: UTC+3 (TRT)

Yeniçöte is a neighbourhood in the municipality and district of Kalecik, Ankara Province, Turkey. Its population is 228 (2022).
