= Karalar, Besni =

Village in Adıyaman Province, Turkey

Karalar
- Village
- Location within Turkey
- Coordinates: 37.487°N 37.593°E
- Country: Turkey
- Province: Adıyaman
- District: Besni
- Population (2021): 220
- Time zone: UTC+3 (TRT)

Karalar (Kurdish: Kerikan) is a village in the Besni District, Adıyaman Province, Turkey. The village is populated by Kurds of the Çeqelan and Hevêdan tribes and had a population of 220 in 2021.
