= Camuşçu, Besni =

Village in Adıyaman Province, Turkey

Camuşçu
- Village
- Location within Turkey
- Coordinates: 37.599°N 37.845°E
- Country: Turkey
- Province: Adıyaman
- District: Besni
- Population (2021): 378
- Time zone: UTC+3 (TRT)

Camuşçu (Kurdish: Çemêçîyan) is a village in the Besni District, Adıyaman Province, Turkey. It is populated by Kurds of the Hevêdan tribe and had a population of 378 in 2021.
