= Kızılpınar, Besni =

Village in Adıyaman Province, Turkey

Kızılpınar
- Village
- Location within Turkey
- Coordinates: 37.729°N 37.779°E
- Country: Turkey
- Province: Adıyaman
- District: Besni
- Population (2021): 65
- Time zone: UTC+3 (TRT)

Kızılpınar is a village in the Besni District, Adıyaman Province, Turkey. Its population is 65 (2021).
