= Üçgöz, Besni =

Village in Adıyaman Province, Turkey

Üçgöz
- Village
- Location within Turkey
- Coordinates: 37.639°N 37.966°E
- Country: Turkey
- Province: Adıyaman
- District: Besni
- Population (2021): 1,086
- Time zone: UTC+3 (TRT)

Üçgöz (formerly known as Sofraz or Sofrazköy) is a village in the Besni District, Adıyaman Province, Turkey. Its population is 1,086 (2021). Before the 2013 reorganisation, it was a town (belde).

== Archeology ==
South of the village flows the Sofraz Çayı (also called the Değirmen Çayı), a tributary of the Göksu.

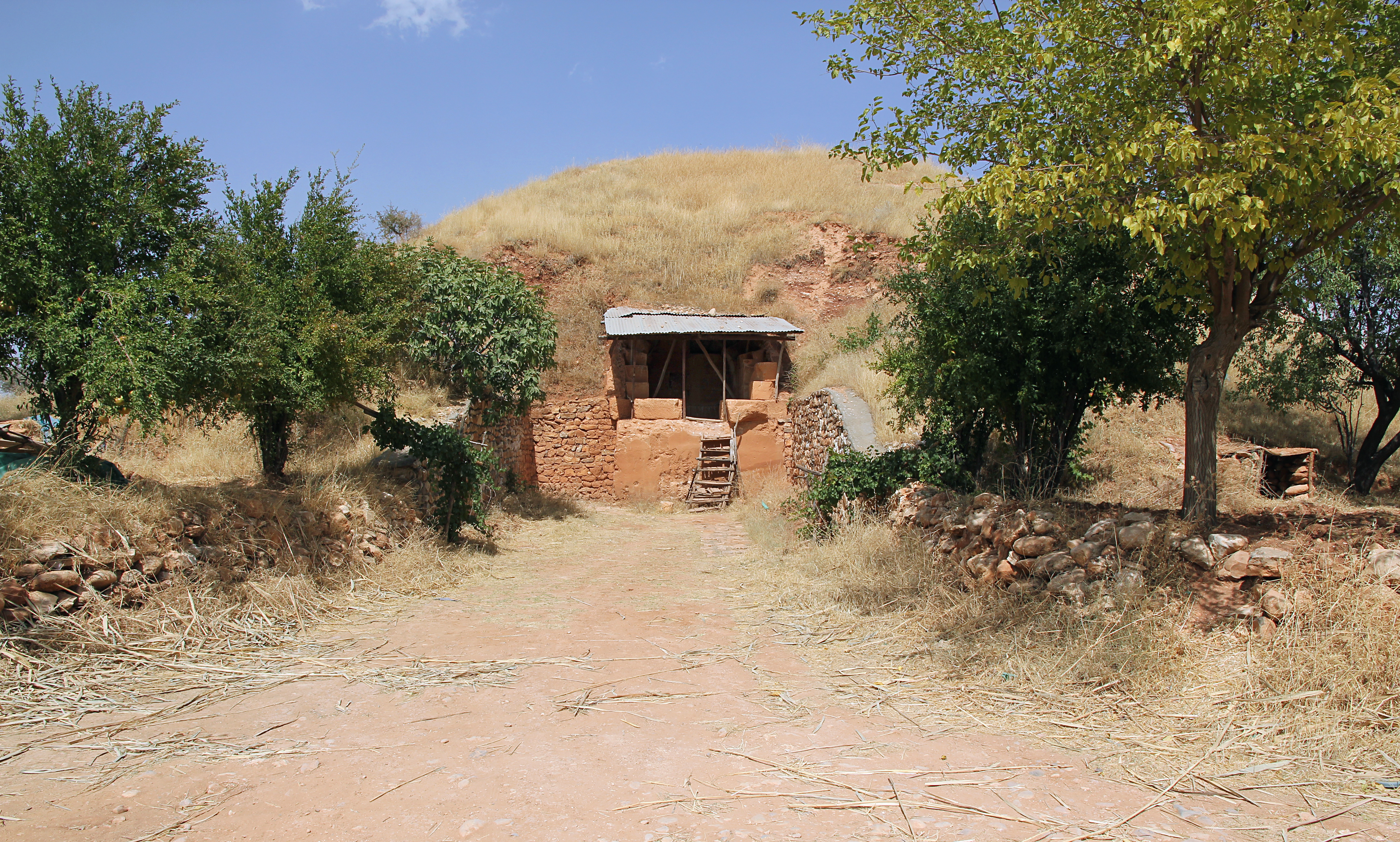
Tumulus A of Sofraz

South of the village is an ancient settlement of Hellenistic and Roman date (based on archaeological finds). In this area, a stele was found in 1973, which shows Antiochus I of Commagene and Apollo shaking hands. Another find was a funerary altar with a relief carving of a griffin on a wheel and an inscription in which the genealogy of a noble Commagenian family is described. The altar is now on display in the Adıyaman Archaeological Museum. Near the settlement are the two Tumuli of Sofraz, which contain Roman chamber tombs.
