= Başlı, Besni =

Village in Adıyaman Province, Turkey

Başlı
- Village
- Location within Turkey
- Coordinates: 37.636°N 38.070°E
- Country: Turkey
- Province: Adıyaman
- District: Besni
- Population (2021): 238
- Time zone: UTC+3 (TRT)

Başlı is a village in the Besni District, Adıyaman Province, Turkey. Its population is 238 (2021).

The hamlets of Akdere and Dereiçi are attached to the village.
