= Yalımköy, Kalecik =

Yalımköy
- Neighbourhood
- Location in Turkey Yalımköy (Turkey Central Anatolia)
- Coordinates: 40°00′N 33°25′E
- Country: Turkey
- Province: Ankara
- District: Kalecik
- Population (2022): 25
- Time zone: UTC+3 (TRT)

Yalımköy is a neighbourhood in the municipality and district of Kalecik, Ankara Province, Turkey. Its population is 25 (2022).
