= Samanlık, Kalecik =

Samanlık
- Neighbourhood
- Location in Turkey Samanlık (Turkey Central Anatolia)
- Coordinates: 40.02274°N 33.47427°E
- Country: Turkey
- Province: Ankara
- District: Kalecik
- Population (2022): 418
- Time zone: UTC+3 (TRT)

Samanlık is a neighbourhood in the municipality and district of Kalecik, Ankara Province, Turkey. Its population is 418 (2022).
