= Hasanlı, Besni =

Village in Adıyaman Province, Turkey

Hasanlı
- Village
- Location within Turkey
- Coordinates: 37.594°N 37.884°E
- Country: Turkey
- Province: Adıyaman
- District: Besni
- Population (2021): 322
- Time zone: UTC+3 (TRT)

Hasanlı is a village in the Besni District, Adıyaman Province, Turkey. Its population is 322 (2021).
