= Çilboğaz, Besni =

Village in Adıyaman Province, Turkey

Çilboğaz
- Village
- Location within Turkey
- Coordinates: 37.717°N 37.870°E
- Country: Turkey
- Province: Adıyaman
- District: Besni
- Population (2021): 90
- Time zone: UTC+3 (TRT)

Çilboğaz is a village in the Besni District, Adıyaman Province, Turkey. Its population is 90 (2021).
