= Doğankaya, Besni =

Village in Adıyaman Province, Turkey

Doğankaya
- Village
- Location in Turkey
- Coordinates: 37.702°N 38.038°E
- Country: Turkey
- Province: Adıyaman
- District: Besni
- Population (2021): 109
- Time zone: UTC+3 (TRT)

Doğankaya is a village in the Besni District, Adıyaman Province, Turkey. Its population was 109 in 2021.
