= Suvarlı, Besni =

Town in Adıyaman Province, Turkey

Suvarlı
- Municipality
- Location in Turkey
- Coordinates: 37.536°N 37.634°E
- Country: Turkey
- Province: Adıyaman
- District: Besni
- Population (2021): 1,927
- Time zone: UTC+3 (TRT)

Suvarlı (Kurdish: Hevêdî) is a town (belde) and municipality in the Besni District, Adıyaman Province, Turkey. The town is populated by Kurds of the Hevêdan tribe and had a population of 1,927 in 2021.
