= Dereboğazı, Palandöken =

Village in Turkey

Dereboğazı
- Neighbourhood
- Location in Turkey
- Coordinates: 39°49′12″N 41°01′30″E
- Country: Turkey
- Province: Erzurum
- District: Palandöken
- Population (2022): 832
- Time zone: UTC+3 (TRT)

Dereboğazı is a neighbourhood in the municipality and district of Palandöken, Erzurum Province in Turkey. Its population is 832 (2022).
