= Berete, Besni =

Village in Adıyaman Province, Turkey

Berete
- Village
- Location in Turkey
- Coordinates: 37.516°N 37.957°E
- Country: Turkey
- Province: Adıyaman
- District: Besni
- Population (2021): 352
- Time zone: UTC+3 (TRT)

Berete is a village in the Besni District, Adıyaman Province, Turkey. Its population is 352 (2021).
