= Şambayat, Besni =

Town in Adıyaman Province, Turkey

Şambayat
- Municipality
- Location in Turkey
- Coordinates: 37.683°N 38.047°E
- Country: Turkey
- Province: Adıyaman
- District: Besni
- Population (2021): 3,468
- Time zone: UTC+3 (TRT)

Şambayat (Kurdish: Şambeyad) is a town (belde) and municipality in the Besni District, Adıyaman Province, Turkey. It is populated by Kurds of the Balan and Karalos tribes and by Turks. It had a population of 3,468 in 2021.
