= Kızılkaya, Kalecik =

Kızılkaya
- Neighbourhood
- Location in Turkey Kızılkaya (Turkey Central Anatolia)
- Coordinates: 40.1550°N 33.3893°E
- Country: Turkey
- Province: Ankara
- District: Kalecik
- Population (2022): 69
- Time zone: UTC+3 (TRT)

Kızılkaya is a neighbourhood in the municipality and district of Kalecik, Ankara Province, Turkey. Its population is 69 (2022).
