= Köseceli, Besni =

Town in Adıyaman Province, Turkey

Köseceli
- Municipality
- Location in Turkey
- Coordinates: 37.557°N 37.729°E
- Country: Turkey
- Province: Adıyaman
- District: Besni
- Population (2021): 1,948
- Time zone: UTC+3 (TRT)

Köseceli (Kurdish: Kosecelî) is a town (belde) and municipality in the Besni District, Adıyaman Province, Turkey. The town is populated by Kurds of the Hevêdan and Kosan tribes had a population of 1,948 in 2021.

The settlements of Aşağı Söğütlü (Kurdish Bêkan) and Tetirli are attached to Köseceli. Tetirli (Tetrîyan) and Aşağı Söğütlü are populated by Kurds of the Hevêdan tribe.
