= Çaykaya, Besni =

Village in Adıyaman Province, Turkey

Çaykaya
- Village
- Location within Turkey
- Coordinates: 37°40′41″N 37°43′13″E
- Country: Turkey
- Province: Adıyaman
- District: Besni
- Population (2021): 393
- Time zone: UTC+3 (TRT)

Çaykaya (Kurdish: Kewcalî) is a village in the Besni District, Adıyaman Province, Turkey. The village is populated by Kurds of the Hevêdan tribe and had a population of 393 in 2021.

The hamlet of Kuzevleri is attached to the village.
