= Aktepe, Besni =

Village in Adıyaman Province, Turkey

Aktepe
- Village
- Location within Turkey
- Coordinates: 37.557°N 37.938°E
- Country: Turkey
- Province: Adıyaman
- District: Besni
- Population (2021): 295
- Time zone: UTC+3 (TRT)

Aktepe (Kurdish: Xirawe) is a village in the Besni District, Adıyaman Province, Turkey. The village is populated by Kurds of the Kosan tribe and had a population of 295 in 2021.
