= Palandöken, Erzurum =

Palandöken
- District and municipality
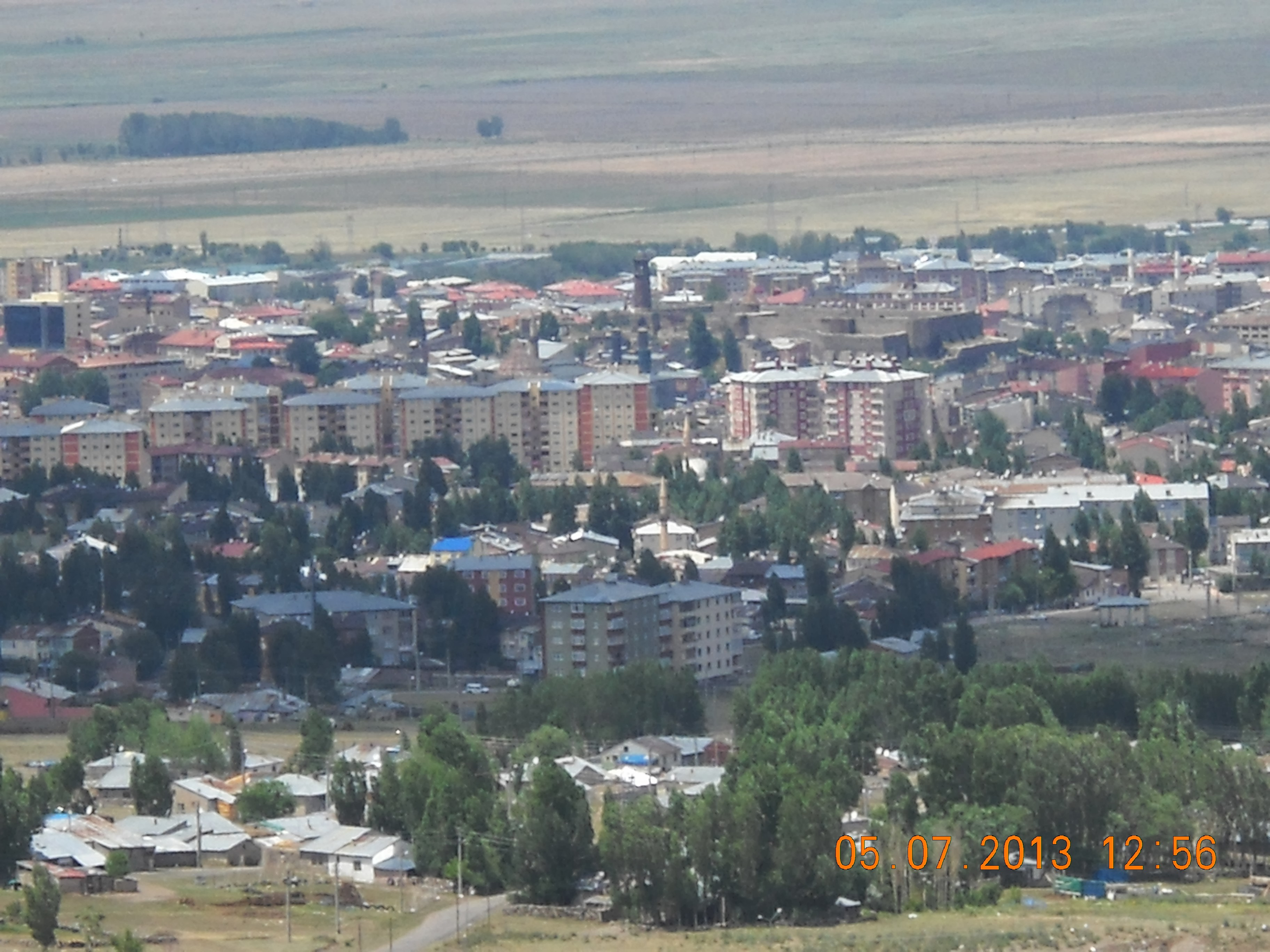

- Logo

- Location within Turkey
- Coordinates: 39°53′N 41°16′E
- Country: Turkey
- Province: Erzurum

Government
  - Mayor: Muhammet Sunar
- Area: 667 km^{2} (258 sq mi)
- Population (2022): 177,374
  - Density: 266/km^{2} (689/sq mi)
- Time zone: UTC+3 (TRT)
- Postal code: 25070, 25080, 25090
- Area code: 0442
- Website: www.palandoken.bel.tr

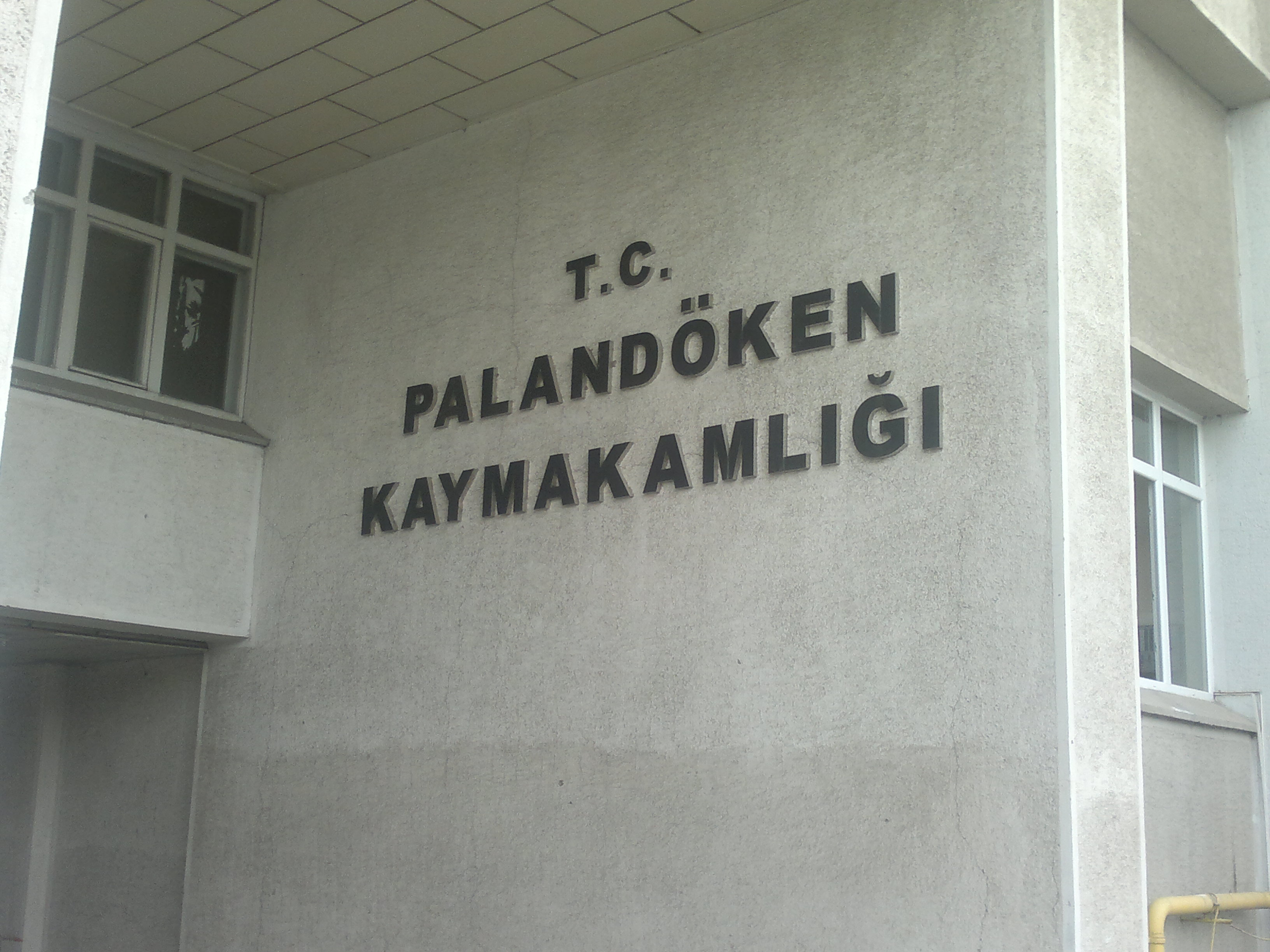
Palandöken ilçe governorate

Palandöken is a municipality and district of Erzurum Province, Turkey. Its area is 667 km^{2}, and its population is 177,374 (2022). It covers the southern part of the urban area of Erzurum. It is named after Palandöken Mountain which is a ski resort. The district was created from part of the former central district of Erzurum in 2008.

The ice hockey venue Palandöken Ice Skating Hall was opened in 2008.

== Neighbourhoods ==
Neighbourhoods (Mahalle) are small administrative units within the municipalities, and are administered by the muhtar and the Neighborhood Seniors Council consisting of 4 members. Muhtar and the Senior Council are elected for 5 years at the local elections and are not affiliated with political parties. Neighborhoods are not an incorporation therefore do not hold government status. Muhtar, although being elected by the residents, acts merely as an administrator of the district governor. Muhtar can voice the neighborhood issues to the municipal hall together with the Seniors Council.

There are 26 neighbourhoods in Palandöken District:

- A.Menderes
- Abdurrahman Gazi
- Alibezirgan
- Aziziye
- Börekli
- Çeperli
- Dereboğazı
- Güllüköy
- Güzelyurt
- Hancığaz
- Hüseyin Avni Ulaş
- Konaklı
- Kümbet
- Müftü Solakzade
- Nenehatun
- Şehitler
- Sığırlı
- Taşlıgüney
- Tekkederesi
- Tepeköy
- Toparlak
- Uzunahmet
- Yağmurcuk
- Yıkılhan
- Yukarıyenice
- Yunus Emre
