= Eşmedere, Kalecik =

Eşmedere
- Neighbourhood
- Country: Turkey
- Province: Ankara
- District: Kalecik
- Population (2022): 70
- Time zone: UTC+3 (TRT)

Eşmedere is a neighbourhood in the municipality and district of Kalecik, Ankara Province, Turkey. Its population is 70 (2022).
