= Harmanlı, Gölbaşı =

Town in Adıyaman Province, Turkey

Harmanlı
- Municipality
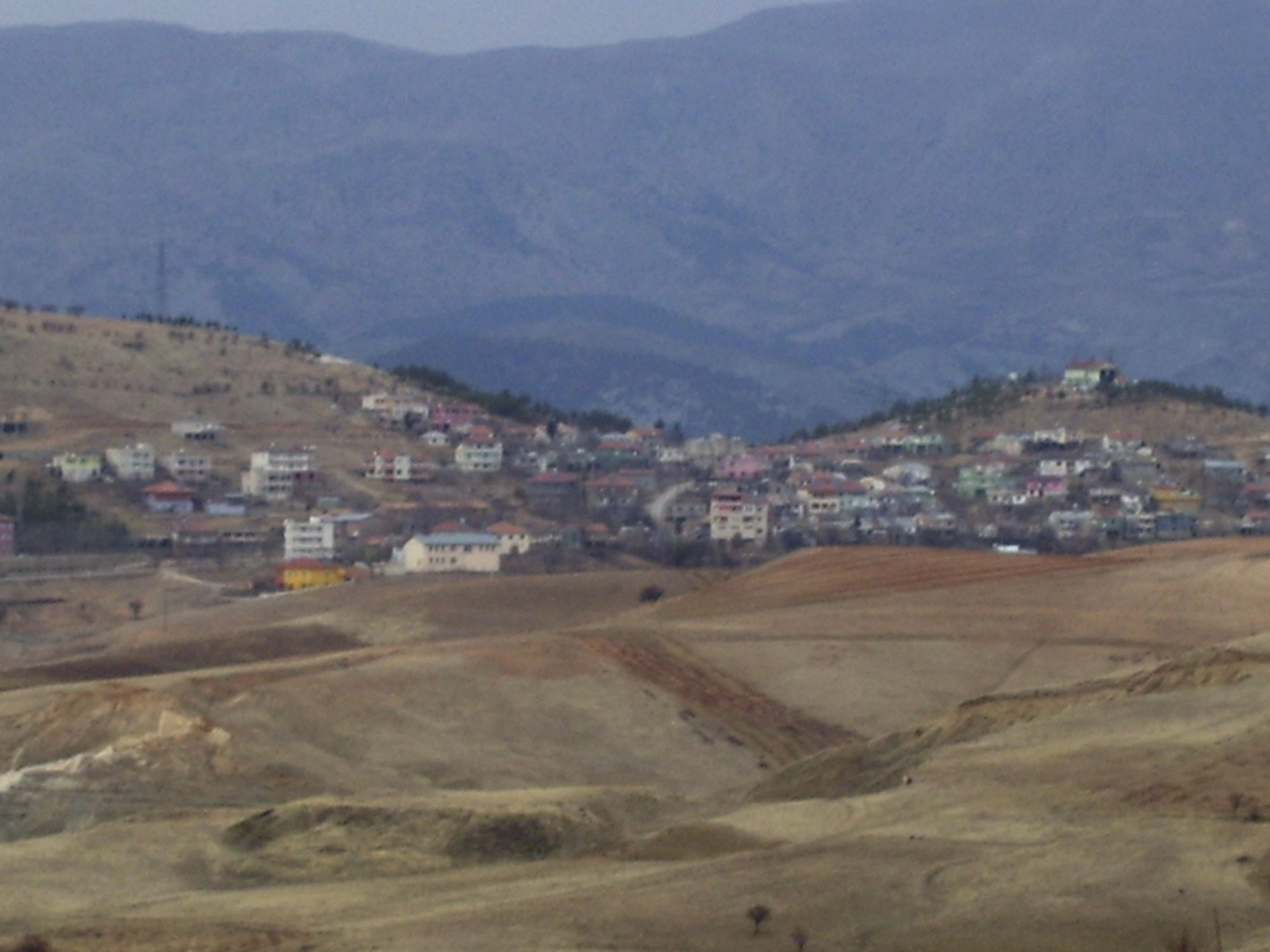

- Location within Turkey
- Coordinates: 37°50′17″N 37°44′37″E
- Country: Turkey
- Province: Adıyaman
- District: Gölbaşı
- Population (2021): 1,585
- Time zone: UTC+3 (TRT)

Harmanlı is a town (belde) and municipality in the Gölbaşı District, Adıyaman Province, Turkey. It was populated by Turks and had a population of 1,585 in 2021. The people of Harmanli are mainly Sunni.
