= İzollu, Besni =

Village in Adıyaman Province, Turkey

İzollu
- Village
- Location within Turkey
- Coordinates: 37.470°N 37.920°E
- Country: Turkey
- Province: Adıyaman
- District: Besni
- Population (2021): 667
- Time zone: UTC+3 (TRT)

İzollu (formerly Güzelyurt, Kurdish: Îzol) is a village in the Besni District, Adıyaman Province, Turkey. The village is populated by Kurds of the Kosan tribe and had a population of 667 in 2021.
