= Bahri, Besni =

Village in Adıyaman Province, Turkey

Bahri
- Village
- Location within Turkey
- Coordinates: 37.508°N 38.115°E
- Country: Turkey
- Province: Adıyaman
- District: Adıyaman
- Population (2021): 157
- Time zone: UTC+3 (TRT)

Bahri (Kurdish: Behrî) is a village in the Adıyaman District, Adıyaman Province, Turkey. The village is populated by Kurds of the Şikakî tribe and had a population of 157 in 2021.
