= Yukarısöğütlü, Besni =

Village in Adıyaman Province, Turkey

Yukarısöğütlü
- Village
- Location within Turkey
- Coordinates: 37.516°N 37.769°E
- Country: Turkey
- Province: Adıyaman
- District: Besni
- Population (2021): 1,880
- Time zone: UTC+3 (TRT)

Yukarısöğütlü is a village in the Besni District, Adıyaman Province, Turkey. Its population is 281 (2021).
