= Aq Tappeh, Kurdistan =

Aq Tappeh آق تپه
- Village
- Location within Iran
- Coordinates: 36°18′23″N 46°23′54″E
- Country: Iran
- Province: Kurdistan
- County: Saqqez
- Bakhsh: Central
- Rural District: Sara

Population (2006)
  - Total: 79
- Time zone: UTC+3:30 (IRST)
  - Summer (DST): UTC+4:30 (IRDT)

Aq Tappeh (Persian: آق تپه, also Romanized as Āq Tappeh) is a village in Sara Rural District, in the Central District of Saqqez County, Kurdistan Province, Iran. At the 2006 census, its population was 79, in 13 families. The village is populated by Kurds.
