= Kesmetepe, Besni =

Town in Adıyaman Province, Turkey

Kesmetepe
- Municipality
- Location in Turkey
- Coordinates: 37.544°N 37.840°E
- Country: Turkey
- Province: Adıyaman
- District: Besni
- Population (2021): 1,582
- Time zone: UTC+3 (TRT)

Kesmetepe is a town (belde) and municipality in the Besni District, Adıyaman Province, Turkey. Its population is 1,582 (2021).

The settlements of Çakmak and İncekoz are attached to the village. Çakmak is populated by Kurds of the Reşwan tribe.
