= Kesecik, Besni =

Village in Adıyaman Province, Turkey

Kesecik
- Village
- Location within Turkey
- Coordinates: 37.578°N 38.048°E
- Country: Turkey
- Province: Adıyaman
- District: Besni
- Population (2021): 630
- Time zone: UTC+3 (TRT)

Kesecik is a village in the Besni District, Adıyaman Province, Turkey. Its population is 630 (2021).
