= Kalecik, Ankara =

Kalecik
- District and municipality
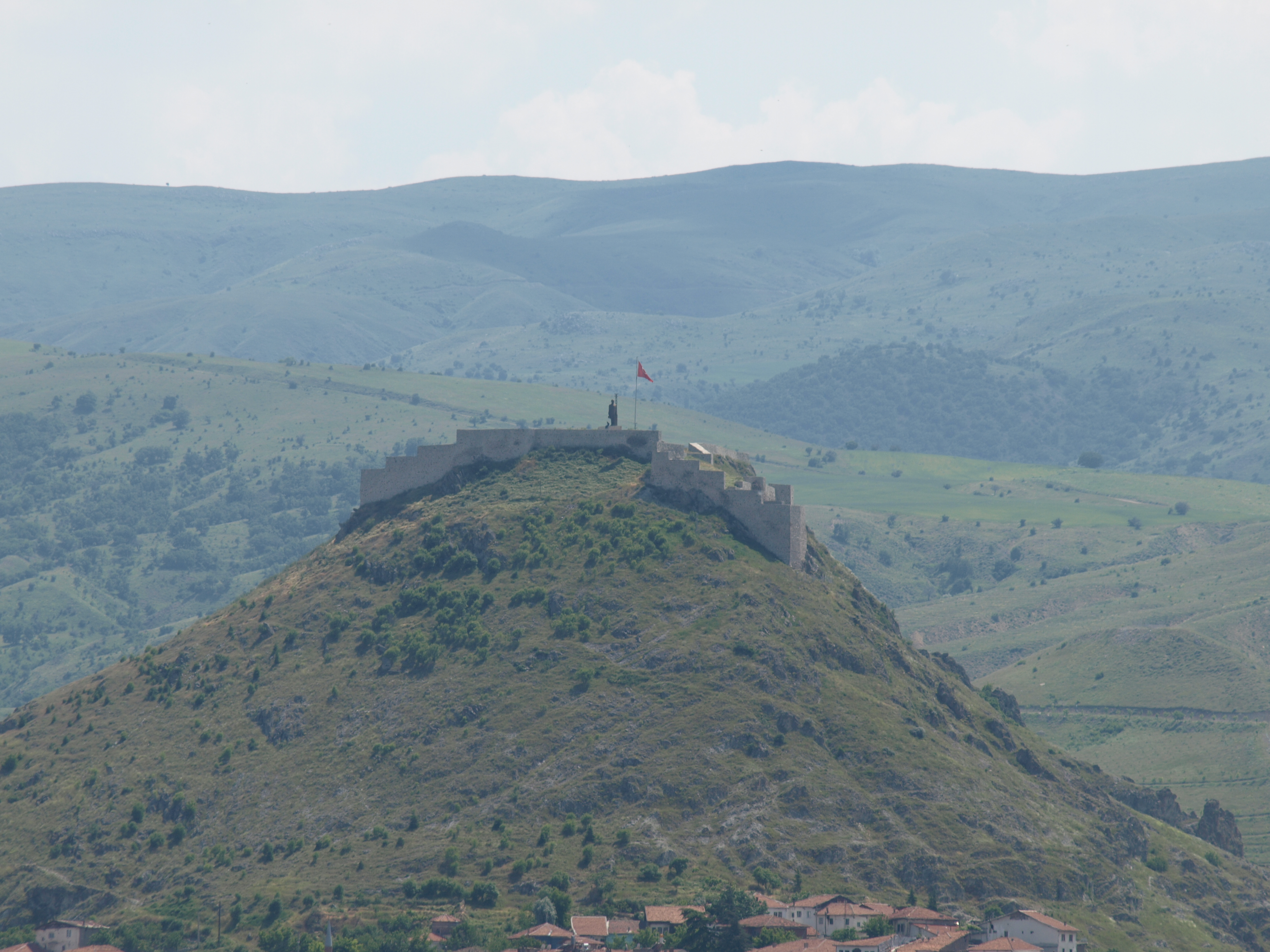
- Kalecik castle

- Map showing Kalecik District in Ankara Province

- Location within Turkey Location within Turkey Central Anatolia
- Coordinates: 40°05′50″N 33°24′30″E
- Country: Turkey
- Province: Ankara

Government
  - Mayor: Satılmış Karakoç (CHP)
- Area: 1,110 km^{2} (430 sq mi)
- Elevation: 725 m (2,379 ft)
- Population (2022): 12,794
  - Density: 11.5/km^{2} (29.9/sq mi)
- Time zone: UTC+3 (TRT)
- Postal code: 06870
- Area code: 0312
- Website: www.kalecik.bel.tr

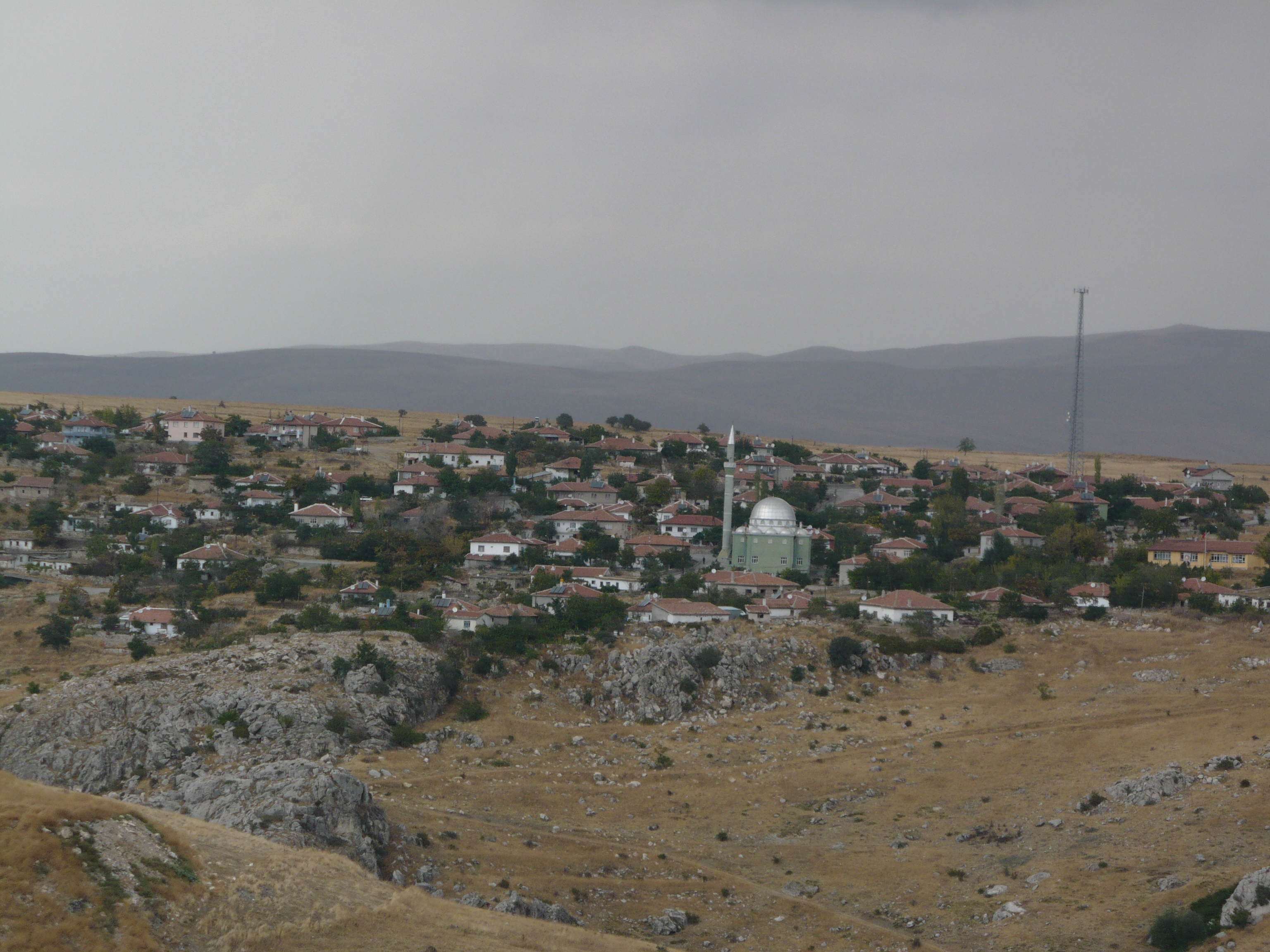
View of Kalecik

Kalecik is a municipality and district of Ankara Province, Turkey. Its area is 1,110 km^{2}, and its population is 12,794 (2022). Its elevation is 725 m (2,379 ft).

Kalecik stands on a plain with the eastern boundary formed by the River Kızılırmak while there are mountains to the south and the west. This agricultural district is known for its wine; other major crops include sugar beet and grains.

The popular grape variety Kalecik Karası grows successfully near the Kızılırmak and is used to make some of Turkey's best red wine.

== History ==
The area has a history going back to the Hittites and even earlier (4000 BC). In the Ottoman Empire period this was a thriving town recorded by the 17th-century traveler Evliya Çelebi as being a trading city with tanneries, coppersmiths, and weavers.

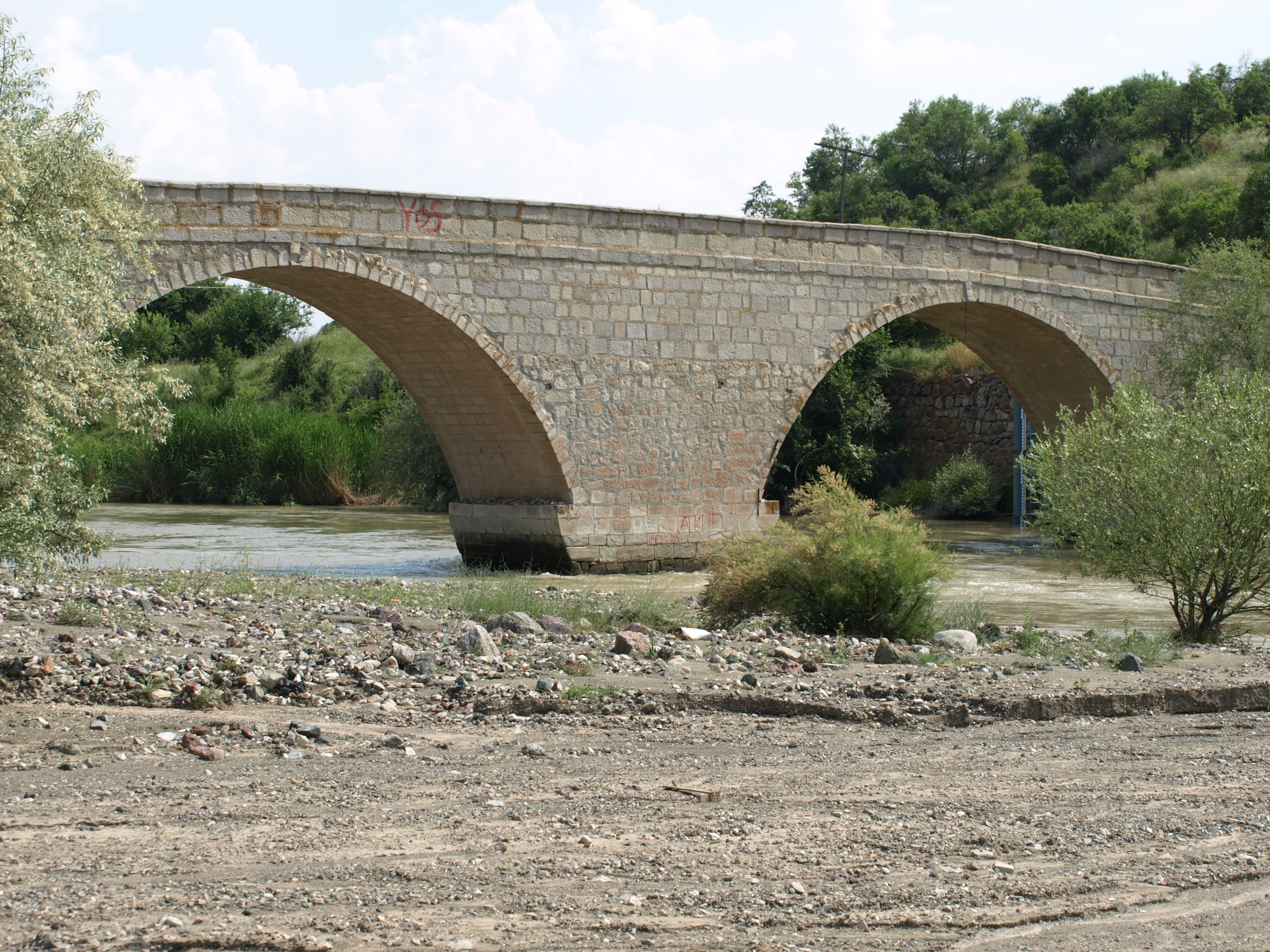
Bridge over the Kızılırmak near Kalecik.

== Education ==
The vocational school of higher education in Kalecik (Turkish: Kalecik Meslek Yüksekokulu), part of Ankara University, educates in viticulture and winemaking.

== Places of interest ==
- Kalecik Castle, an Ancient Roman ruin on the rock above the town
- Kalecik Bridge
- Ottoman architecture, including a number of mosques and the seven-arch Develioğlu Köprüsü bridge over the Kızılırmak at 40.0414°N 33.4440°E.

== Composition ==
There are 57 neighbourhoods in Kalecik District:

- Afşar
- Ahikemalşenyurt
- Ahiler Yenice
- Akcataş
- Akkaynak
- Akkuzulu
- Aktepe
- Alibeyli
- Altıntaş
- Arkbürk
- Beykavağı
- Buğra
- Çandır
- Çanşa Kale
- Çaykaya
- Çiftlikköy
- Cuma Saray
- Dağdemir
- Değirmenkaya
- Demirtaş
- Elmapınar
- Eskiköy
- Eşmedere
- Gökçeören
- Gökdere
- Gölköy
- Gümüşpınar
- Hacıköy
- Halilağa Tabakhane
- Halitcevriaslangil
- Hançılı
- Hasayaz
- Karahöyük
- Karalar
- Karatepe
- Kargın
- Keklicek
- Kılçak
- Kınık
- Kızılkaya
- Koyunbaba
- Kuyucak
- Mahmutlar
- Samanlık
- Satılar
- Şemsettin
- Şeyhmahmut
- Tavşancık
- Tilki
- Uyurca
- Yalımköy
- Yeniçöte
- Yenidoğan Yeşilyurt
- Yeşilöz
- Yılanlı
- Yurtyenice
- Yüzbey
