= Besni =

- Municipality
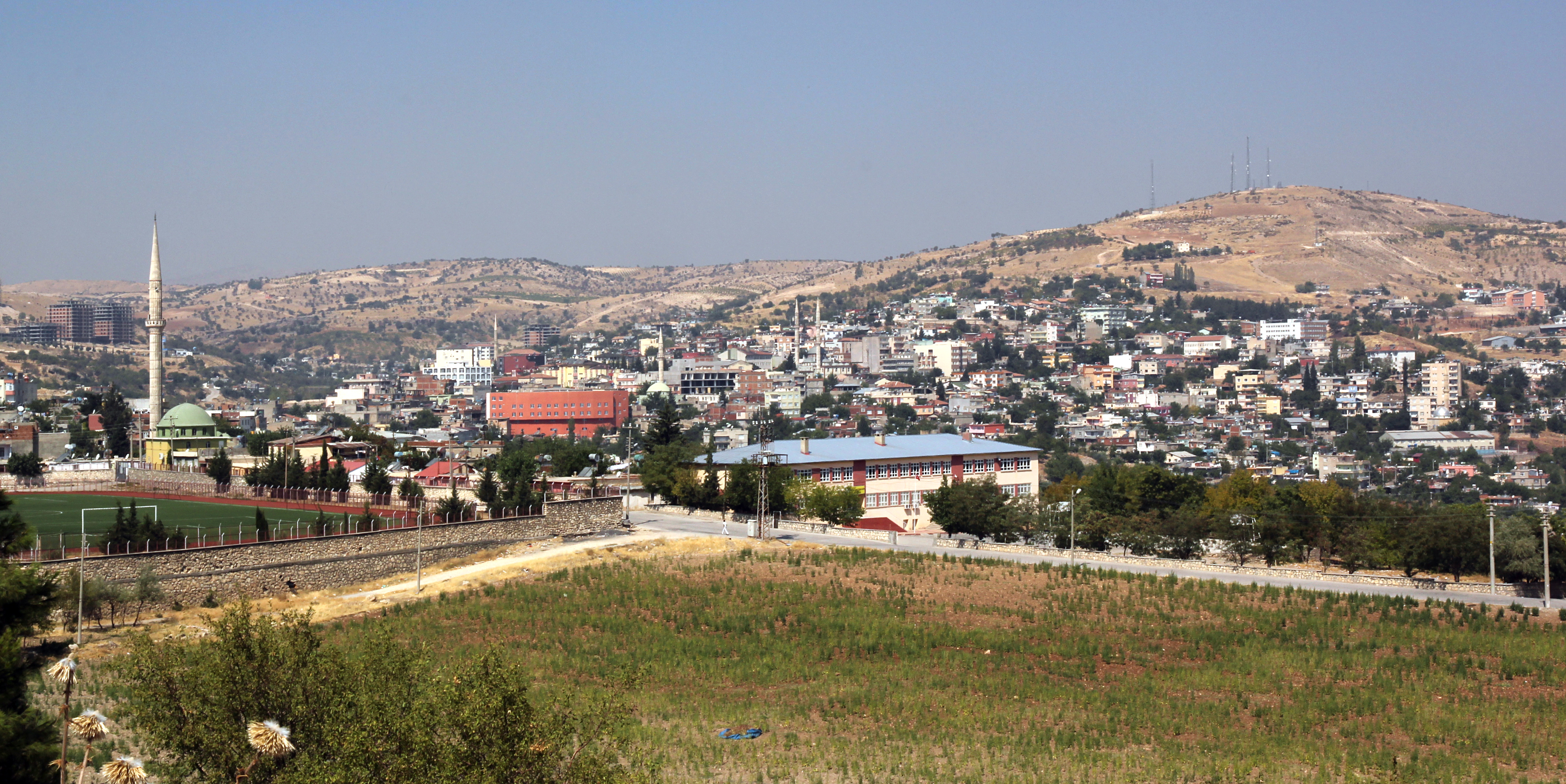

- Location within Turkey
- Coordinates: 37°41′39″N 37°51′41″E
- Country: Turkey
- Province: Adıyaman
- District: Besni

Government
  - Mayor: Eyyüp Mehmet Emre (AKP)
- Elevation: 1,050 m (3,440 ft)
- Population (2021): 37,323
- Time zone: UTC+3 (TRT)
- Postal code: 02300
- Website: www.besni.bel.tr

Besni (Kurdish: Bêsnî) is a town of Adıyaman Province of Turkey, 44 km west of the city of Adıyaman. It is the seat of Besni District. Its population is 37,323 (2021).

== History ==
The city was historically known as Bahasna. It was controlled by the Byzantines until it was captured by the Umayyad army in 670. The region was retaken by the Byzantines under Nikephoros II Phokas until 1084 or 1085, when Buldaci, one of the Turkish commanders of Suleiman ibn Qutalmish, the founder of the Sultanate of Rum, conquered several castles in the region. However, Bahasna was captured from the Seljuk Turks and controlled by the Crusaders during the First Crusade in 1097, to be ruled later by the Armenian ruler, Kogh Vasil. The Armenian Catholicos Parsegh of Cilicia was residing in the town at the time of his death around 1113/1114.

Later on, it became part of the County of Edessa in 1116. It remained under the control of the Franks, until it was taken by Mesud I the Sultan of Rum in 1150. In 1156, it was captured by the Zengid ruler Nur ad-Din Mahmud ibn Zangi, then it came under the control of Seljuk ruler Kilij Arslan II until 1173, until the emergence of the Ayyubids when it was captured by Saladin.

The region which was controlled by the Ayyubid Emir of Syria, An-Nasir Yusuf, was conquered by Hulagu Khan who then granted it to Armenian King Hethum I by 1261. In 1268, Hethum I had to surrender several fortresses including Bahasna to Baybars, who had imprisoned Hethum's son, Leo, following the Battle of Mari. However, Baybars revoked his claims to secure Sunqur al-Ashqar's release. In 1293, the Mamluk sultan Al-Ashraf Khalil recaptured the city, after devastating raids on the Armenian Kingdom of Cilicia, and appointed Sayf al-Dīn Tughan al-Manṣūri as na'ib. In 1400, the region was overrun by Timur's forces.

== Demographics ==
In the mid-17th century, Ottoman traveller Evliya Çelebi mentioned that the population of the town was of Turkmen origin in his seyahatnâme.

== Sources ==
- Raphael, Kate (2010). Muslim Fortresses in the Levant: Between Crusaders and Mongols. Routledge. ISBN 9781136925269.
- MacEvitt, Christopher (2007). "The Chronicle of Matthew of Edessa: Apocalypse, the First Crusade and the Armenian Diaspora". Dumbarton Oaks Papers. 61: 157–181.
- Toprak, Sejdi Vakkas (2015). Besni. Adıyaman (in Turkish). Adıyaman Üniversitesi Yayınları. ISBN 978-605-9134-01-9.
