= Toklu, Besni =

Village in Adıyaman Province, Turkey

Toklu
- Village
- Location within Turkey
- Coordinates: 37.631°N 37.807°E
- Country: Turkey
- Province: Adıyaman
- District: Besni
- Population (2021): 422
- Time zone: UTC+3 (TRT)

Toklu (Kurdish: Birişme) is a village in the Besni District, Adıyaman Province, Turkey. The village is populated by Kurds of the Hevêdan tribe and had a population of 422 in 2021.
