= Aktepe, Kalecik =

Aktepe
- Neighbourhood
- Location in Turkey Aktepe (Turkey Central Anatolia)
- Coordinates: 40.1498°N 33.5188°E
- Country: Turkey
- Province: Ankara
- District: Kalecik
- Population (2022): 71
- Time zone: UTC+3 (TRT)

Aktepe is a neighbourhood in the municipality and district of Kalecik, Ankara Province, Turkey. Its population is 71 (2022).
