= Beşyol, Besni =

Village in Adıyaman Province, Turkey

Beşyol
- Village
- Location within Turkey
- Coordinates: 37.547°N 38.075°E
- Country: Turkey
- Province: Adıyaman
- District: Besni
- Population (2021): 539
- Time zone: UTC+3 (TRT)

Beşyol is a village in the Besni District, Adıyaman Province, Turkey. Its population is 539 (2021).

The hamlets of Evcili, Karakeçi and Konak are attached to the village.
