= Değirmenkaya, Kalecik =

Değirmenkaya
- Neighbourhood
- Location in Turkey Değirmenkaya (Turkey Central Anatolia)
- Coordinates: 40.2295°N 33.3485°E
- Country: Turkey
- Province: Ankara
- District: Kalecik
- Population (2022): 216
- Time zone: UTC+3 (TRT)

Değirmenkaya is a neighbourhood in the municipality and district of Kalecik, Ankara Province, Turkey. Its population is 216 (2022).
