= Akkaynak, Kalecik =

Akkaynak
- Neighbourhood
- Location in Turkey Akkaynak (Turkey Central Anatolia)
- Coordinates: 40°10′N 33°24′E
- Country: Turkey
- Province: Ankara
- District: Kalecik
- Population (2022): 122
- Time zone: UTC+3 (TRT)

Akkaynak is a neighbourhood in the municipality and district of Kalecik, Ankara Province, Turkey. Its population is 122 (2022).
