= Kızılkaya, Besni =

Village in Adıyaman Province, Turkey

Kızılkaya
- Village
- Location within Turkey
- Coordinates: 37.496°N 38.028°E
- Country: Turkey
- Province: Adıyaman
- District: Besni
- Population (2021): 241
- Time zone: UTC+3 (TRT)

Kızılkaya is a village in the Besni District, Adıyaman Province, Turkey. Its population is 241 (2021).
