= Aq Tappeh, North Khorasan =

Aq Tappeh اق تپه
- Village
- Location within Iran
- Coordinates: 37°32′54″N 57°27′00″E
- Country: Iran
- Province: North Khorasan
- County: Bojnord
- Bakhsh: Garmkhan
- Rural District: Garmkhan

Population (2006)
  - Total: 600
- Time zone: UTC+3:30 (IRST)
  - Summer (DST): UTC+4:30 (IRDT)

Aq Tappeh (Persian: اق تپه, also Romanized as Āq Tappeh) is a village in the Garmkhan Rural District, Garmkhan District, Bojnord County, North Khorasan Province, Iran. At the 2006 census, its population was 600, in 132 families.
