= Balkar, Gölbaşı =

Town in Adıyaman Province, Turkey

Balkar
- Municipality
- Location in Turkey
- Coordinates: 37.730°N 37.563°E
- Country: Turkey
- Province: Adıyaman
- District: Gölbaşı
- Population (2021): 2,091
- Time zone: UTC+3 (TRT)

Balkar is a town (belde) and municipality in the Gölbaşı District, Adıyaman Province, Turkey. Its population is 2,091 (2021).
