= Tilki, Kalecik =

Tilki
- Neighbourhood
- Location in Turkey Tilki (Turkey Central Anatolia)
- Coordinates: 40.2088°N 33.5147°E
- Country: Turkey
- Province: Ankara
- District: Kalecik
- Population (2022): 33
- Time zone: UTC+3 (TRT)

Tilki is a neighbourhood in the municipality and district of Kalecik, Ankara Province, Turkey. Its population is 33 (2022).
