= Alişar, Besni =

Village in Adıyaman Province, Turkey

Alişar
- Village
- Location within Turkey
- Coordinates: 37.620°N 38.008°E
- Country: Turkey
- Province: Adıyaman
- District: Besni
- Population (2021): 244
- Time zone: UTC+3 (TRT)

Alişar is a village in the Besni District, Adıyaman Province, Turkey. Its population is 244 (2021).
