= Topkapı, Besni =

Village in Adıyaman Province, Turkey

Topkapı
- Village
- Location within Turkey
- Coordinates: 37.521°N 38.091°E
- Country: Turkey
- Province: Adıyaman
- District: Besni
- Population (2021): 332
- Time zone: UTC+3 (TRT)

Topkapı is a village in the Besni District, Adıyaman Province, Turkey. Its population is 332 (2021).
