= Akkuyu, Besni =

Village in Adıyaman Province, Turkey

Akkuyu
- Village
- Location within Turkey
- Coordinates: 37.519°N 37.825°E
- Country: Turkey
- Province: Adıyaman
- District: Besni
- Population (2021): 162
- Time zone: UTC+3 (TRT)

Akkuyu is a village in the Besni District, Adıyaman Province, Turkey. The village is populated by Kurds of the Reşwan tribe and had a population of 162 in 2021.

The hamlet of Çakallıyusufağa is attached to the village.
