= Sugözü, Besni =

Village in Adıyaman Province, Turkey

Sugözü
- Village
- Location within Turkey
- Coordinates: 37.667°N 37.790°E
- Country: Turkey
- Province: Adıyaman
- District: Besni
- Population (2021): 586
- Time zone: UTC+3 (TRT)

Sugözü (also known as Eskiköy, Kurdish: Dîêkevn) is a village in the Besni District, Adıyaman Province, Turkey. The village is populated by Kurds of the Birîman and Hevêdan tribes and had a population of 586 in 2021. Before the 2013 reorganisation, it was a town (belde).
