= Astragalus xerophilus =

Scientific classification
- Kingdom: Plantae
- Clade: Tracheophytes
- Clade: Angiosperms
- Clade: Eudicots
- Clade: Rosids
- Order: Fabales
- Family: Fabaceae
- Subfamily: Faboideae
- Genus: Astragalus
- Species: A. xerophilus

Binomial name
- Astragalus xerophilus Ledeb.

Synonyms
- Solenotus xerophilus (Ledeb.) Steven; Tragacantha xerophila (Ledeb.) Kuntze

Species of flowering plant

Astragalus xerophilus is a species of flowering plant in the family Fabaceae.

The species was described in 1843, by botanist Carl Friedrich von Ledebour.

Astragalus xerophilus is native to eastern Turkey, northwest Iran, and Transcaucasia. It is a perennial.
