= Belören, Gölbaşı =

Town in Adıyaman Province, Turkey

Belören
- Municipality
- Location in Turkey
- Coordinates: 37.6372°N 37.5803°E
- Country: Turkey
- Province: Adıyaman
- District: Gölbaşı
- Population (2021): 2,015
- Time zone: UTC+3 (TRT)

Belören is a town (belde) and municipality in the Gölbaşı District, Adıyaman Province, Turkey. The village is populated by Turks and had a population of 2,015 in 2021. Both Alevism and Sunni Islam are present in the village.
