= Tokar, Besni =

Village in Adıyaman Province, Turkey

Tokar
- Village
- Location within Turkey
- Coordinates: 37.585°N 38.024°E
- Country: Turkey
- Province: Adıyaman
- District: Besni
- Population (2021): 131
- Time zone: UTC+3 (TRT)

Tokar is a village in the Besni District, Adıyaman Province, Turkey. Its population is 131 (2021).

The hamlet of Kapaklı is attached to the village.
