= Güzelyurt, Palandöken =

Village in Turkey

Güzelyurt
- Neighbourhood
- Location in Turkey
- Coordinates: 39°47′28″N 41°2′9″E
- Country: Turkey
- Province: Erzurum
- District: Palandöken
- Population (2022): 273
- Time zone: UTC+3 (TRT)

Güzelyurt is a neighbourhood in the municipality and district of Palandöken, Erzurum Province in Turkey. Its population is 273 (2022).
