= Gölbaşı, Adıyaman =

Town in Adıyaman Province, Turkey

Gölbaşı
- Municipality
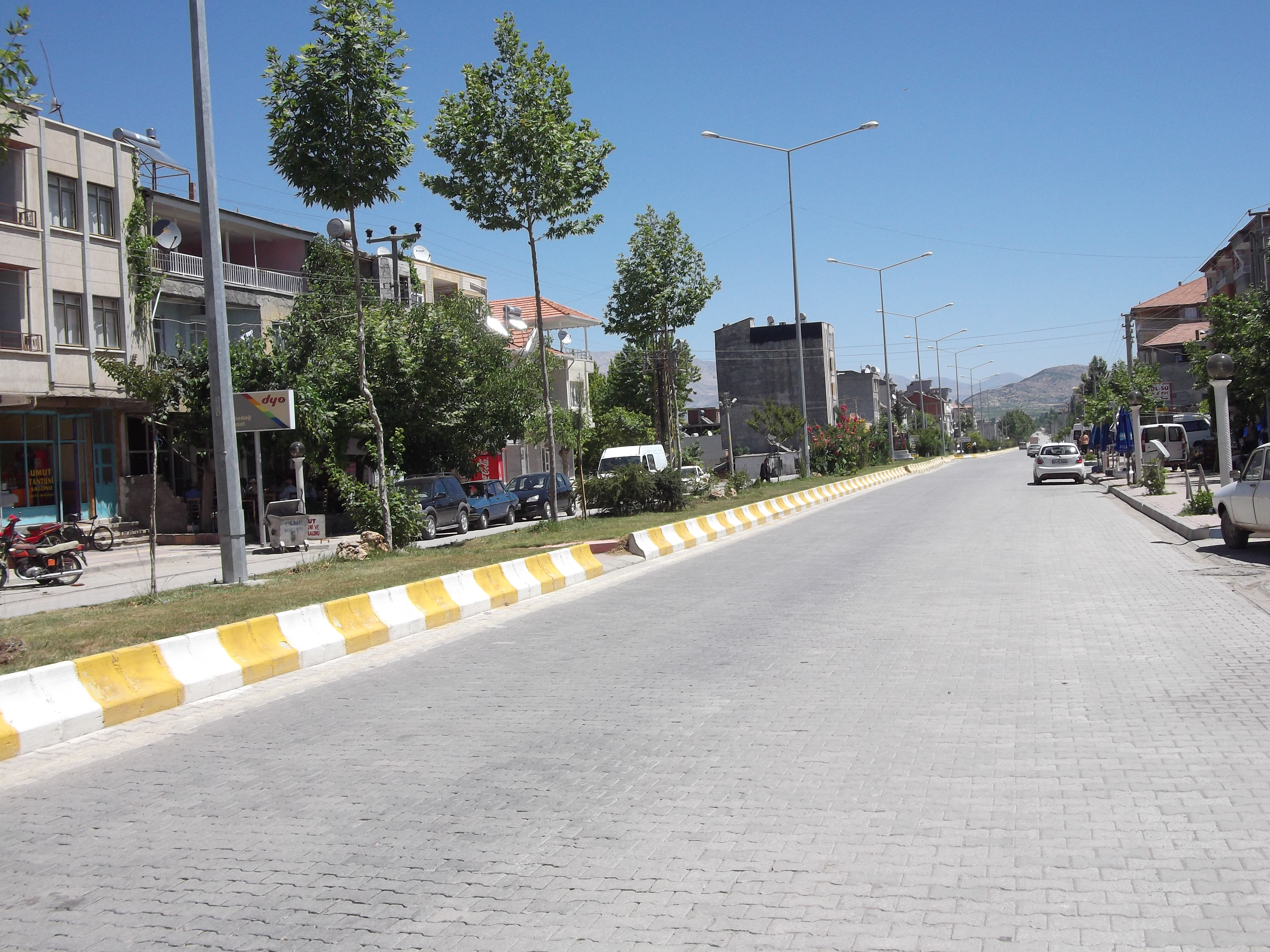

- Location within Turkey
- Coordinates: 37°47′02″N 37°38′40″E
- Country: Turkey
- Province: Adıyaman
- District: Gölbaşı

Government
  - Mayor: İskender Yıldırım (CHP)
- Elevation: 862 m (2,828 ft)
- Population (2021): 33,373
- Time zone: UTC+3 (TRT)
- Postal code: 02500
- Website: www.golbasi.bel.tr

Gölbaşı (Kurdish: Serêgolê) is a town of Adıyaman Province of Turkey. It stands between Malatya and Gaziantep cities. It is the seat of Gölbaşı District. Its population is 33,373 (2021). The town is next to Lake Gölbaşı.

İskender Yıldırım (CHP) is the incumbent mayor of this town since the 2019 local elections.
