= Harmanardı, Besni =

Village in Adıyaman Province, Turkey

Harmanardı
- Village
- Location within Turkey
- Coordinates: 37.699°N 37.907°E
- Country: Turkey
- Province: Adıyaman
- District: Besni
- Population (2021): 75
- Time zone: UTC+3 (TRT)

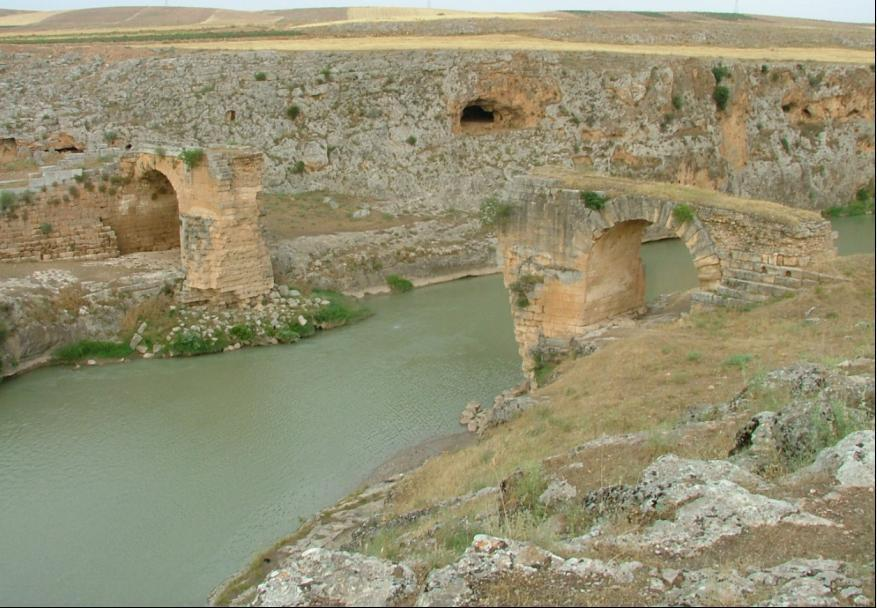

Harmanardı is a village in the Besni District, Adıyaman Province, Turkey. Its population is 75 (2021).
