= Çataltepe, Gölbaşı =

Village in Adıyaman Province, Turkey

Çataltepe
- Village
- Location within Turkey
- Coordinates: 37.810°N 37.598°E
- Country: Turkey
- Province: Adıyaman
- District: Gölbaşı
- Population (2021): 338
- Time zone: UTC+3 (TRT)

Çataltepe is a village in the Gölbaşı District, Adıyaman Province, Turkey. Its population is 338 (2021).

The hamlet of Karamağara and Tecirli are attached to the village.
