= Beret (disambiguation) =

Beret a soft, round, flat-crowned hat.

Beret may also refer to:

== Places ==
- Beret, Hungary, a village in Borsod-Abaúj-Zemplén County in northeastern Hungary
- Baqueira-Beret, a ski resort located in the heart of the Pyrenees, in the Aran Valley and Àneu Valley Lleida, Spain

== People ==
- Beret (singer) (born 1996), Spanish pop singer

== See also ==
- Blue Berets, a musical group, part of the Russian Federation Ministry of Defence as part of Song and Dance Ensemble of the airborne troops of Russia
- Brown Berets or Los Boinas Cafes, a pro-Chicano organization that emerged during the Chicano Movement in the late 1960s
- Green beret (disambiguation)
- The Red Beret aka The Red Devils, The Big Jump and retitled Paratrooper for the US release, a 1953 Technicolor British war film
