= Çaykaya, Kalecik =

Çaykaya
- Neighbourhood
- Location in Turkey Çaykaya (Turkey Central Anatolia)
- Coordinates: 40.2806°N 33.4223°E
- Country: Turkey
- Province: Ankara
- District: Kalecik
- Population (2022): 179
- Time zone: UTC+3 (TRT)

Çaykaya is a neighbourhood in the municipality and district of Kalecik, Ankara Province, Turkey. Its population is 179 (2022).
