= List of populated places in Adıyaman Province =

A list of populated places in Adıyaman Province, Turkey by district:

== Adıyaman ==
- Ahmethoca, Adıyaman
- Akdere, Adıyaman
- Akpınar, Adıyaman
- Akyazı, Adıyaman
- Akçalı, Adıyaman
- Akıncılar, Adıyaman
- Alibey, Adıyaman
- Ardıçoluk, Adıyaman
- Atakent, Adıyaman
- Aydınlar, Adıyaman
- Ağaçkonak, Adıyaman
- Battalhüyük, Adıyaman
- Bağdere, Adıyaman
- Bağlıca, Adıyaman
- Bağpınar, Adıyaman
- Başpınar, Adıyaman
- Bebek, Adıyaman
- Bozhüyük, Adıyaman
- Boztepe, Adıyaman
- Boğazözü, Adıyaman
- Börkenek, Adıyaman
- Büklüm, Adıyaman
- Büyükkavaklı, Adıyaman
- Büyükkırıklı, Adıyaman
- Damdırmaz, Adıyaman
- Dardağan, Adıyaman
- Davuthan, Adıyaman
- Derinsu, Adıyaman
- Dişbudak, Adıyaman
- Doyran, Adıyaman
- Durak, Adıyaman
- Durukaynak, Adıyaman
- Ekinci, Adıyaman
- Elmacık, Adıyaman
- Esence, Adıyaman
- Esentepe, Adıyaman
- Eskihüsnümansur, Adıyaman
- Gökçay, Adıyaman
- Gölpınar, Adıyaman
- Gözebaşı, Adıyaman
- Gümüşkaya, Adıyaman
- Güneşli, Adıyaman
- Güzelyurt, Adıyaman
- Hacıhalil, Adıyaman
- Hasancık, Adıyaman
- Hasankendi, Adıyaman
- Karaağaç, Adıyaman
- Karagöl, Adıyaman
- Karahöyük, Adıyaman
- Karakoç, Adıyaman
- Kavak, Adıyaman
- Kayacık, Adıyaman
- Kayatepe, Adıyaman
- Kayaönü, Adıyaman
- Kaşköy, Adıyaman
- Kemerkaya, Adıyaman
- Koruköy, Adıyaman
- Kozan, Adıyaman
- Koçali, Adıyaman
- Kuyucak, Adıyaman
- Kuşakkaya, Adıyaman
- Kömür, Adıyaman
- Kındırali, Adıyaman
- Kızılcahöyük, Adıyaman
- Kızılcapınar, Adıyaman
- Mestan, Adıyaman
- Narince, Adıyaman
- Olgunlar, Adıyaman
- Oluklu, Adıyaman
- Ormaniçi, Adıyaman
- Palanlı, Adıyaman
- Payamlı, Adıyaman
- Paşamezrası, Adıyaman
- Pınaryayla, Adıyaman
- Sarıharman, Adıyaman
- Sarıkaya, Adıyaman
- Taşgedik, Adıyaman
- Taşpınar, Adıyaman
- Tekpınar, Adıyaman
- Toptepe, Adıyaman
- Uludam, Adıyaman
- Uzunköy, Adıyaman
- Uzunpınar, Adıyaman
- Uğurca, Adıyaman
- Yarmakaya, Adıyaman
- Yayladamı, Adıyaman
- Yaylakonak, Adıyaman
- Yazlık, Adıyaman
- Yazıbaşı, Adıyaman
- Yazıca, Adıyaman
- Yedioluk, Adıyaman
- Yenice, Adıyaman
- Yenigüven, Adıyaman
- Yeniköy, Adıyaman
- Yeşilova, Adıyaman
- Yeşiltepe, Adıyaman
- Ziyaretpayamlı, Adıyaman
- Çamgazi, Adıyaman
- Çamlıca, Adıyaman
- Çamyurdu, Adıyaman
- Çatalağaç, Adıyaman
- Çaylı, Adıyaman
- Çayırlı, Adıyaman
- Çemberlitaş, Adıyaman
- Çobandede, Adıyaman
- İncebağ, Adıyaman
- İnceler, Adıyaman
- İndere, Adıyaman
- Şerefli, Adıyaman

== Besni ==
- Akkuyu, Besni
- Akpınar, Besni
- Aktepe, Besni
- Akyazı, Besni
- Alişar, Besni
- Alıçlı, Besni
- Atmalı, Besni
- Aşağısöğütlü, Besni
- Aşağıçöplü, Besni
- Başlı, Besni
- Bereketli, Besni
- Besni
- Beşkoz, Besni
- Beşyol, Besni
- Boncuk, Besni
- Burunçayır, Besni
- Dikilitaş, Besni
- Dogankaya, Besni
- Dörtyol, Besni
- Eğerli, Besni
- Geçitli, Besni
- Gümüşlü, Besni
- Güneykaş, Besni
- Güzelyurt, Besni
- Hacıhalil, Besni
- Harmanardı, Besni
- Hasanlı, Besni
- Karagüveç, Besni
- Karalar, Besni
- Kargalı, Besni
- Kesecik, Besni
- Kesmetepe, Besni
- Konuklu, Besni
- Kurugöl, Besni
- Kutluca, Besni
- Kuzevleri, Besni
- Köseceli, Besni
- Kızılhisar, Besni
- Kızılin, Besni
- Kızılkaya, Besni
- Kızılpınar, Besni
- Oyalı, Besni
- Oyratlı, Besni
- Pınarbaşı, Besni
- Sarıkaya, Besni
- Sarıyaprak, Besni
- Sayören, Besni
- Sugözü, Besni
- Suvarlı, Besni
- Taşlıyazı, Besni
- Tekağaç, Besni
- Tokar, Besni
- Toklu, Besni
- Topkapı, Besni
- Uzunkuyu, Besni
- Yazıbeydilli, Besni
- Yazıkarakuyu, Besni
- Yelbastı, Besni
- Yeniköy, Besni
- Yoldüzü, Besni
- Yukarısöğütlü, Besni
- Çakırhüyük, Besni
- Çamlıca, Besni
- Çamuşçu, Besni
- Çaykaya, Besni
- Çilboğaz, Besni
- Çomak, Besni
- Çorak, Besni
- Ören, Besni
- Üçgöz, Besni
- Şambayat, Besni

== Gerger ==
- Açma, Gerger
- Ağaçlı, Gerger
- Aşağıdağlıca, Gerger
- Beybostan, Gerger
- Beşgöze, Gerger
- Budaklı, Gerger
- Burçaklı, Gerger
- Cevizpınar, Gerger
- Dallarca, Gerger
- Dağdeviren, Gerger
- Demirtaş, Gerger
- Eskikent, Gerger
- Gerger
- Geçitli, Gerger
- Gölyurt, Gerger
- Gönen, Gerger
- Gözpınar, Gerger
- Gümüşkaşık, Gerger
- Gündoğdu, Gerger
- Güngörmüş, Gerger
- Gürgenli, Gerger
- Güzelsu, Gerger
- Kaşyazı, Gerger
- Kesertaş, Gerger
- Konacık, Gerger
- Korulu, Gerger
- Koşarlar, Gerger
- Köklüce, Gerger
- Kütüklü, Gerger
- Kılıç, Gerger
- Nakışlı, Gerger
- Onevler, Gerger
- Ortaca, Gerger
- Oymaklı, Gerger
- Saraycık, Gerger
- Seyitmahmut, Gerger
- Sutepe, Gerger
- Yayladalı, Gerger
- Yağmurlu, Gerger
- Yenibardak, Gerger
- Yeşilyurt, Gerger
- Yukarıdağlıca, Gerger
- Çamiçi, Gerger
- Çifthisar, Gerger
- Çobanpınarı, Gerger
- Üçkaya, Gerger

== Gölbaşı ==
- Aktoprak, Gölbaşı
- Akçabel, Gölbaşı
- Akçakaya, Gölbaşı
- Aşağıazaplı, Gölbaşı
- Aşağıkarakuyu, Gölbaşı
- Aşağınasırlı, Gölbaşı
- Bağlarbaşı, Gölbaşı
- Belkar, Gölbaşı
- Belören, Gölbaşı
- Cankara, Gölbaşı
- Gedikli, Gölbaşı
- Gölbaşı, Adıyaman
- Hacılar, Gölbaşı
- Hamzalar, Gölbaşı
- Harmanlı, Gölbaşı
- Haydarlı, Gölbaşı
- Karabahşılı, Gölbaşı
- Karaburun, Gölbaşı
- Küçükören, Gölbaşı
- Meydan, Gölbaşı
- Ozan, Gölbaşı
- Savran, Gölbaşı
- Yarbaşı, Gölbaşı
- Yaylacık, Gölbaşı
- Yeniköy, Gölbaşı
- Yukarıkarakuyu, Gölbaşı
- Yukarınasırlı, Gölbaşı
- Yukarıçöplü, Gölbaşı
- Çatalağaç, Gölbaşı
- Çataltepe, Gölbaşı
- Çelik, Gölbaşı
- Örenli, Gölbaşı

== Kahta ==
- Adalı, Kahta
- Akalın, Kahta
- Akdoğan, Kahta
- Akkavak, Kahta
- Akpınar, Kahta
- Aktaş, Kahta
- Akıncılar, Kahta
- Alidamı, Kahta
- Arılı, Kahta
- Aydınpınar, Kahta
- Ballı, Kahta
- Bağbaşı, Kahta
- Belenli, Kahta
- Belören, Kahta
- Beşikli, Kahta
- Bostanlı, Kahta
- Bozpınar, Kahta
- Boztarla, Kahta
- Boğazkaya, Kahta
- Burmapınar, Kahta
- Bölükyayla, Kahta
- Büyükbağ, Kahta
- Büyükbey, Kahta
- Damlacık, Kahta
- Dardağan, Kahta
- Doluca, Kahta
- Dumlu, Kahta
- Dutköy, Kahta
- Eceler, Kahta
- Ekinci, Kahta
- Erikdere, Kahta
- Erikli, Kahta
- Fındıklıçalı, Kahta
- Fıstıklı, Kahta
- Geldibuldu, Kahta
- Gökçe, Kahta
- Gölgeli, Kahta
- Göçeri, Kahta
- Güdülge, Kahta
- Güzelçay, Kahta
- Habipler, Kahta
- Hacıyusuf, Kahta
- Hasköy, Kahta
- Karacaören, Kahta
- Karadut, Kahta
- Kavaklı, Kahta
- Kayadibi, Kahta
- Kocahisar, Kahta
- Kozağaç, Kahta
- Koçtepe, Kahta
- Kâhta
- Köseler, Kahta
- Menzil, Kahta
- Mülkköy, Kahta
- Narince, Kahta
- Narsırtı, Kahta
- Oluklu, Kahta
- Ortanca, Kahta
- Ovacık, Kahta
- Salkımbağı, Kahta
- Sarısu, Kahta
- Susuz, Kahta
- Sıraca, Kahta
- Sırakaya, Kahta
- Taşlıca, Kahta
- Teğmenli, Kahta
- Tuğlu, Kahta
- Tütenocak, Kahta
- Ulupınar, Kahta
- Yapraklı, Kahta
- Yelkovan, Kahta
- Yenikuşak, Kahta
- Yolaltı, Kahta
- Zeytinköy, Kahta
- Ziyaret, Kahta
- Çakıreşme, Kahta
- Çaltılı, Kahta
- Çardak, Kahta
- Çataltepe, Kahta
- Çaybaşı, Kahta
- Çukurtaş, Kahta
- Çıralık, Kahta
- İkizce, Kahta
- İslamköy, Kahta
- Şahintepe, Kahta

== Samsat ==
- Akdamar, Samsat
- Bayırlı, Samsat
- Bağarası, Samsat
- Doğanca, Samsat
- Göltarla, Samsat
- Gülpınar, Samsat
- Kovanoluk, Samsat
- Kuştepe, Samsat
- Kırmacık, Samsat
- Kızılöz, Samsat
- Ovacık, Samsat
- Samsat
- Taşkuyu, Samsat
- Tepeönü, Samsat
- Uzuntepe, Samsat
- Yarımbağ, Samsat
- Çiçekköy, Samsat

== Sincik ==
- Aksu, Sincik
- Alancık, Sincik
- Arıkonak, Sincik
- Balkaya, Sincik
- Dilektepe, Sincik
- Eskiköy, Sincik
- Geçitli, Sincik
- Hasanlı, Sincik
- Hüseyinli, Sincik
- Karaköse, Sincik
- Kıran, Sincik
- Narlı, Sincik
- Sakız, Sincik
- Serince, Sincik
- Serindere, Sincik
- Sincik
- Subaşı, Sincik
- Söğütlübahçe, Sincik
- Taşkale, Sincik
- Yarpuzlu, Sincik
- Çamdere, Sincik
- Çat, Sincik
- Çatbahçe, Sincik
- İnlice, Sincik
- Şahinbeyler, Sincik
- Şahkolu, Sincik

== Tut ==
- Akçatepe, Tut
- Boyundere, Tut
- Elçiler, Tut
- Havutlu, Tut
- Kaşlıca, Tut
- Köseli, Tut
- Meryemuşağı, Tut
- Tepecik, Tut
- Tut
- Yalankoz, Tut
- Yaylımlı, Tut
- Yeşilyurt, Tut
- Çiftlik, Tut
- Öğütlü, Tut
- Ünlüce, Tut

== Çelikhan ==
- Aksu, Çelikhan
- Altıntaş, Çelikhan
- Bozgedik, Çelikhan
- Gölbağı, Çelikhan
- Kalecik, Çelikhan
- Karagöl, Çelikhan
- Karaçayır, Çelikhan
- Korucak, Çelikhan
- Köseuşağı, Çelikhan
- Mutlu, Çelikhan
- Pınarbaşı, Çelikhan
- Recepköy, Çelikhan
- Taşdamlar, Çelikhan
- Yağızatlı, Çelikhan
- Yeşiltepe, Çelikhan
- Yeşilyayla, Çelikhan
- Çampınar, Çelikhan
- Çelikhan
- İzci, Çelikhan
