= Doğanlı =

Doğanlı may refer to:

- Doğanlı, Adıyaman, a village in Adıyaman Province, Turkey
- Doğanlı, Dinar, a village in Afyonkarahisar Province, Turkey
- Doğanlı, Düzce, a village in Düzce Province, Turkey
- Doğanlı, Genç, a village in Bingöl Province, Turkey
- Doğanlı, Güney, a village in Denizli Province, Turkey
- Doğanlı, Kızıltepe, a village in Mardin Province, Turkey
- Doğanlı, Mazgirt, a village in Tunceli Province, Turkey
- Doğanlı, Nusaybin, a village in Mardin Province, Turkey
- Doğanlı, Sur, a village in Diyarbakır Province, Turkey
- Doğanlı, Tufanbeyli, a neighbourhood in Adana Province, Turkey
- Doğanlı, Yüksekova, a village in Hakkari Province, Turkey
