= Kemerkaya =

Kemerkaya may refer to:

- Kemerkaya, Adıyaman, Turkey
- Kemerkaya, Bolvadin, Turkey
- Kemerkaya, Kemah
- Kemerkaya, Oltu
- Kəmərqaya, Azerbaijan
