= Düzce (disambiguation) =

Düzce is a city in northwestern Turkey.

Düzce may also refer to:

- Düzce Province, a province of Turkey
- Düzce District, a district of Düzce Province
- Düzce (electoral district), representing the Province in the Grand National Assembly
- Düzce University, in Düzce
- Düzce, Adıyaman, a village in Adıyaman Province, Turkey
- Düzce, Kulp, a village in Diyarbakır Province, Turkey
- Düzce, Nusaybin, a village in Mardin Province, Turkey
- Düzce, Yavuzeli, a village in Gaziantep Province, Turkey
- Düzce, Yüreğir, a village in Adana Province, Turkey
