= Çatalağaç =

Çatalağaç (literally "forked tree") is a Turkish place name that may refer to:

- Çatalağaç, Adıyaman, a village in the District of Adıyaman, Adıyaman Province, Turkey
- Çatalağaç, Gölbaşı, a village in the District of Gölbaşı, Adıyaman Province, Turkey
