= Kuyulu =

Kuyulu may refer to the following settlements in Turkey:

- Kuyulu, Adıyaman, a village in Adıyaman Province
- Kuyulu, Artuklu, a village in Mardin Province
- Kuyulu, Aydın, a neighbourhood in the municipality and district of Efeler
- Kuyulu, Derik, a village in Mardin Province
- Kuyulu, Elâzığ, a village in Elazığ Province
- Kuyulu, İdil, a village in Şırnak Province
- Kuyulu, Nusaybin or Kuyular, a village in Mardin Province
