= Aydınlar =

Aydınlar or Aydinlar may refer to:

== People ==
- Mehmet Ali Aydınlar, Turkish businessman

== Places ==
- Tillo or Aydınlar, a district in Siirt Province, Turkey
- Aydınlar, Adıyaman, a village in the Adıyaman district of Adıyaman Province, Turkey
- Aydınlar, Bartın, a village in the Bartın district of Bartın Province, Turkey
- Aydınlar, Erdemli, a village in the Erdemli district of Mersin Province, Turkey
- Aydınlar, Elâzığ, a village in the Elazığ District of Elazığ Province, Turkey
- Aydınlar, Gerede, a village in the Gerede district of Bolu Province, Turkey
- Aydınlar, Honaz, a village in the Honaz district of Denizli Province, Turkey
- Aydinlar, Azerbaijan, a village in the Davachi Rayon, Azerbaijan
