= Bağdere =

Bağdere can refer to:

- Bağdere, Adıyaman
- Bağdere, Elâzığ
- Bağdere, Silvan
- Bagh Daraq
