= Bozhüyük =

Bozhüyük is a Turkish place name that may refer to:

- Bozhüyük, Adıyaman, a village in the district of Adıyaman, Adıyaman Province, Turkey
- Bozhüyük, Elmalı, a village in the district of Elmalı, Antalya Province, Turkey
- Bozhüyük, İhsaniye, a village in the district of İhsaniye, Afyonkarahisar Province, Turkey
