= Ağveren, Adıyaman =

Village in Adıyaman Province, Turkey

Ağveren
- Village
- Location within Turkey
- Coordinates: 37.744°N 38.128°E
- Country: Turkey
- Province: Adıyaman
- District: Adıyaman
- Population (2021): 146
- Time zone: UTC+3 (TRT)

Ağveren (Kurdish: Axwêran) is a village in the Adıyaman District, Adıyaman Province, Turkey. The village is populated by Kurds of the Reşwan tribe and had a population of 146 in 2021.
