= Külafhüyük, Adıyaman =

Village in Adıyaman Province, Turkey

Külafhüyük
- Village
- Location within Turkey
- Coordinates: 37.628°N 38.121°E
- Country: Turkey
- Province: Adıyaman
- District: Adıyaman
- Population (2021): 490
- Time zone: UTC+3 (TRT)

Külafhüyük (Kurdish: Kulaflig) is a village in the Adıyaman District, Adıyaman Province, Turkey. The village is populated by Kurds of the Reşwan tribe and had a population of 490 in 2021.

The hamlet of Çavuşlar is attached to the village.
