= Ormaniçi =

Ormaniçi can refer to the following villages in Turkey:

- Ormaniçi, Adıyaman
- Ormaniçi, Sındırgı
