= Lokman, Adıyaman =

Village in Adıyaman Province, Turkey

Lokman
- Village
- Location within Turkey
- Coordinates: 37.703°N 38.321°E
- Country: Turkey
- Province: Adıyaman
- District: Adıyaman
- Population (2021): 153
- Time zone: UTC+3 (TRT)

Lokman (Kurdish: Loqman) is a village in the Adıyaman District, Adıyaman Province, Turkey. The village is populated by Kurds of the Reşwan tribe and had a population of 153 in 2021.

The hamlets of Beşyol and Sarıgül are attached to the village.
