= Kayaönü =

Kayaönü is a Turkishplace name and it may refer to:

- Kayaönü, Adıyaman a village in Adıyaman (central) district of Adıyaman Province
- Kayaönü, Palu a village in Palu district of Elazığ Province
- Kayaönü, Ermenek a village in Ermenek district of Karaman Province
- Kayaönü, Mut a village in Mut district of Mersin Province
