= Çemberlitaş =

Çemberlitaş is a Turkish word meaning "hooped stone" and may refer to:

- The Column of Constantine, a Roman monumental column in Istanbul, Turkey
  - Forum of Constantine, containing the column, today known as Çemberlitaş Square
  - Çemberlitaş, Fatih, the neighborhood of Istanbul containing the column and the forum
- Çemberlitaş Hamamı, a Turkish bath in Istanbul, Turkey
- Çemberlitaş, Adıyaman, a village in the District of Adıyaman, Adıyaman Province, Turkey
