= Yazıca =

Yazıca is a Turkish place name that may refer to the following places in Turkey:

- Yazıca, Adıyaman, a village in the district of Adıyaman, Adıyaman Province
- Yazıca, Kıbrısçık, a village in the district of Kıbrısçık, Bolu Province
