= Varlık (disambiguation) =

Varlık is a Turkish literature and art magazine.

Varlık may also refer to:

== People ==
- Özgür Varlık (born 1979), Turkish sport shooter

== Places ==
- Varlık, Adıyaman, a village in Adıyaman Province, Turkey
- Varlık, Artvin, a village in Artvin Province, Turkey
- Varlık, Cizre, a village in Şırnak Province, Turkey

== See also ==
- Varlık Vergisi, a wealth tax imposed in Turkey 1942–1944
