= Payamlı =

Payamlı can refer to:

- Payamlı, Adıyaman
- Payamlı, Kovancılar
