= Akhisar, Adıyaman =

Village in Adıyaman Province, Turkey

Akhisar
- Village
- Location within Turkey
- Coordinates: 37.657°N 38.116°E
- Country: Turkey
- Province: Adıyaman
- District: Adıyaman
- Population (2021): 109
- Time zone: UTC+3 (TRT)

Akhisar (Kurdish: Şikeft) is a village in the Adıyaman District, Adıyaman Province, Turkey. The village is populated by Kurds of the Reşwan tribe and had a population of 79 in 2021.
