= 100. Yıl, Adıyaman =

Village in Adıyaman Province, Turkey

100. Yıl
- Village
- Location within Turkey
- Coordinates: 37.739°N 38.398°E
- Country: Turkey
- Province: Adıyaman
- District: Adıyaman
- Population (2022): 68
- Time zone: UTC+3 (TRT)

100. Yıl or Yüzüncüyıl (Kurdish: Keltî) is a village in the Adıyaman District, Adıyaman Province, Turkey. The village is populated by Kurds of the Reşwan tribe and had a population of 68 in 2022.

The village is mostly engaged in agriculture and animal husbandry but has in recent years experienced emigration due to increased temperature. The villagers moreover criticized the authorities for lack of support.

== Population ==
Population history from 2008 to 2022:

Population
Year	Pop.	±%
2008	131	—
2009	130	−0.8%
2010	110	−15.4%
2011	136	+23.6%
2012	132	−2.9%
2013	124	−6.1%
2014	110	−11.3%
2015	121	+10.0%
2016	112	−7.4%
2017	127	+13.4%
2018	112	−11.8%
2019	94	−16.1%
2020	76	−19.1%
2021	79	+3.9%
2022	68	−13.9%
