= Yayladamı =

Yayladamı can refer to:

- Yayladamı, Adıyaman
- Yayladamı, Kemaliye
