= Yeşiltepe =

Yeşiltepe (literally "green hill" in Turkish) may refer to:

- The Turkish name of Elia, Kyrenia, Cyprus
- Yeşiltepe, Adıyaman, a village in the district of Adıyaman, Adıyaman Province, Turkey
- Yeşiltepe, Aksaray, a village in the district of Aksaray, Aksaray Province, Turkey
- Yeşiltepe, Amasya, a village in the district of Amasya, Amasya Province, Turkey
- Yeşiltepe, Çelikhan, a village in the district of Çelikhan, Adıyaman Province, Turkey
- Yeşiltepe, Cumayeri
- Yeşiltepe, İspir
- Yeşiltepe, Kaynaşlı
- Yeşiltepe, Tarsus, a town in the district of Tarsus, Mersin Province, Turkey
- Yeşiltepe, Taşova, a village in the district of Taşova, Amasya Province, Turkey
- Yeşiltepe, Vezirköprü, a village in the district of Vezirköprü, Samsun Province, Turkey
