= Yazlık =

Yazlık (Turkish: "summer house") may refer to the following places in Turkey:

- Yazlık, Adıyaman, a village in the district of Adıyaman, Adıyaman Province
- Yazlık, Aydıntepe, a village in the district of Aydıntepe, Bayburt Province
- Yazlık, Balya, a village
- Yazlık, Gölyaka
- Yazlık, Tarsus, a village in the district of Tarsus, Mersin Province
