= Bağpınar =

Bağpınar can refer to:

- Bağpınar, Adıyaman
- Bağpınar, Tercan
