= Başpınar, Adıyaman =

Village in Adıyaman Province, Turkey

Başpınar
- Village
- Location within Turkey
- Coordinates: 37.739°N 38.112°E
- Country: Turkey
- Province: Adıyaman
- District: Adıyaman
- Population (2021): 186
- Time zone: UTC+3 (TRT)

Başpınar (Kurdish: Kulim) is a village in the Adıyaman District, Adıyaman Province, Turkey. It is populated by Kurds of the Balan and Reşwan tribes and had a population of 186 in 2021.

The hamlet of Tilkicik is attached to the village.
