= Şeyhmus Dağtekin =

Kurdish poet and writer

- Born: 1964 (age 61–62); Olgunlar, Adıyaman Province, Turkey
- Occupations: Poet, writer
- Writing career
- Notable awards: Mallarmé Poetry Prize (2007); Théophile Gautier Prize (2008); Yvan Goll International Francophone Poetry Prize

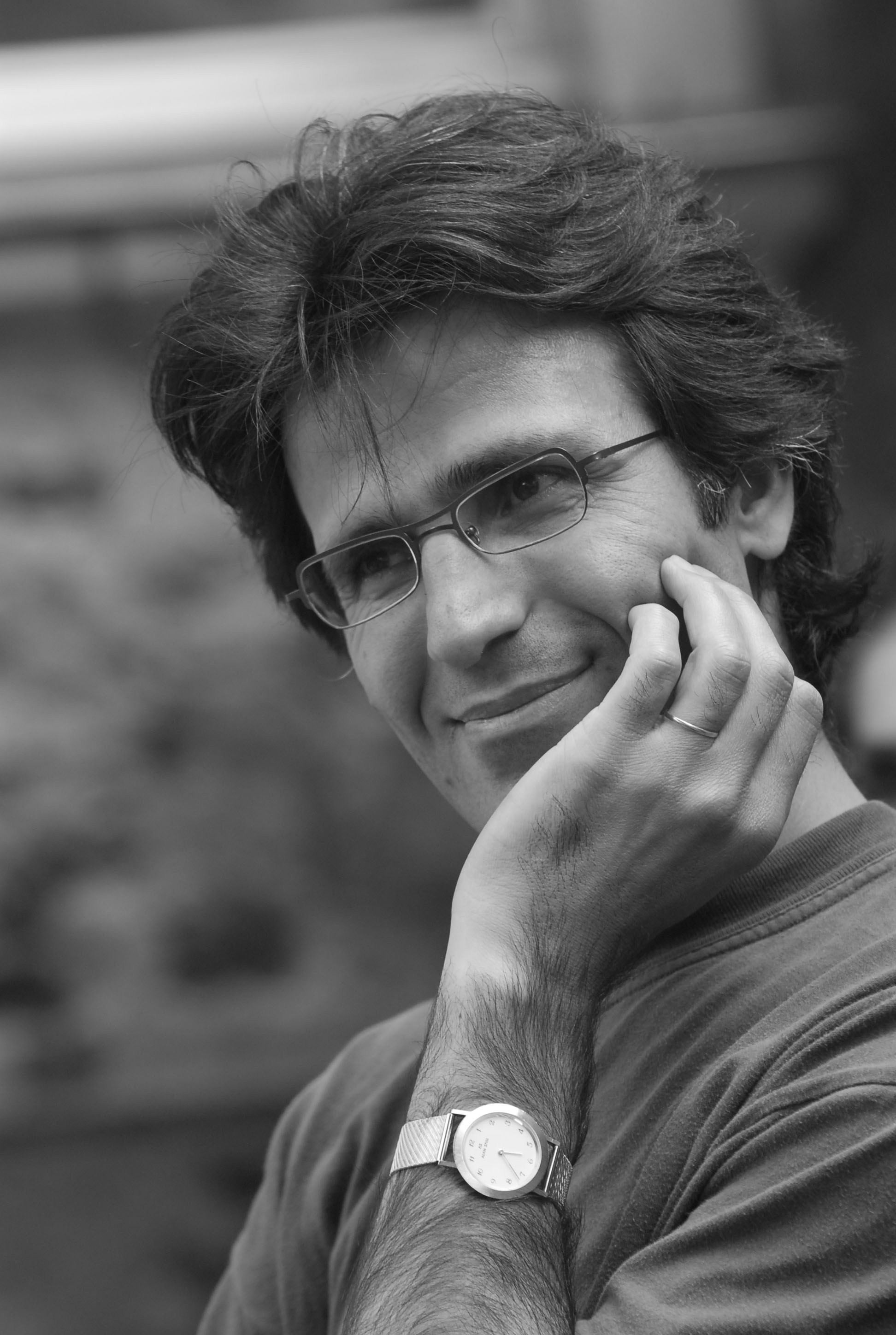
Seyhmus Dagtekin, Photo: Michel Durigneux

Şeyhmus Dağtekin (born in 1964) is a Kurdish poet and writer. Dağtekin was born in the village of Olgunlar in Adıyaman Province in Turkey. He currently resides in France, Paris, where he has lived since 1987. He writes in Turkish, Kurdish or French, and is the author of seven poetry books, and a novel À la source, la nuit. He has played a leading role in renewing French poetry.

== Awards ==
- 2000 : Prix international de poésie francophone Yvan-Goll pour Les Chemins du nocturne
- 2004 : mention spéciale du prix des cinq continents de la francophonie pour À la source, la nuit
- 2007 : Prix Mallarmé pour Juste un pont sans feu
- 2008 : Prix Théophile-Gautier de l'Académie française pour Juste un pont sans feu
- 2015 : Prix Benjamin Fondane pour Élégies pour ma mère
- 2025 : Prix spécial L'Orénoque Robert-Ganzo pour l’ensemble de son œuvre et notamment À la source, la nuit.
- 2025 : Grand prix de poésie de langue française Léopold Sédar Senghor pour Commencements
- 2026 : Grand prix de poésie de la ville de Lyon Roger-Kowalski pour Commencements

== Works ==
- Commencements, Le Castor Astral (2025)
- De la bête et de la nuit, Le Castor Astral (2021)
- Sortir de l'abîme, manifeste, Le Castor astral (2018)
- A l'ouest des ombres, Le Castor astral (2016)
- Élégies pour ma mère, Le Castor astral (2013)
- To the Spring, by Night, MQUP (2013)
- Ma maison de guerre, Le Castor astral (2011)
- Au fond de ma barque, L'Idée bleue (2008)
- Juste un pont sans feu, Le Castor astral (2007)
- La langue mordue, Le Castor astral - Écrits des Forges (2005)
- À la source, la nuit, Robert Laffont (2004)
- Couleurs démêlées du ciel, Le Castor Astral - Écrits des Forges (2003)
- Le verbe temps, Le Castor Astral - Écrits des Forges (2001)
- Les chemins du nocturne, Le Castor Astral (2000)
- Artères-solaires, L'Harmattan (1997)
- Aşkın Yalın Hali, Ünlem Yayınları, 1992
