= Bağpınar Kuyucak, Adıyaman =

Village in Adıyaman Province, Turkey

Bağpınar Kuyucak
- Village
- Location within Turkey
- Coordinates: 37.669°N 38.287°E
- Country: Turkey
- Province: Adıyaman
- District: Adıyaman
- Population (2021): 227
- Time zone: UTC+3 (TRT)

Bağpınar Kuyucak is a village in the Adıyaman District, Adıyaman Province, Turkey. The village had a population of 227 in 2021.

The hamlets of Çiçek and Gazihan are attached to the village.
