= Serhatlı, Adıyaman =

Village in Adıyaman Province, Turkey

Serhatlı
- Village
- Location within Turkey
- Coordinates: 37.804°N 38.435°E
- Country: Turkey
- Province: Adıyaman
- District: Adıyaman
- Population (2021): 295
- Time zone: UTC+3 (TRT)

Serhatlı (Kurdish: Qinik) is a village in the Adıyaman District, Adıyaman Province, Turkey. The village is populated by Kurds of the Kawan tribe and had a population of 295 in 2021.

The hamlet of Küçükkınık is attached to the village.
