= Gölpınar, Adıyaman =

Village in Adıyaman Province, Turkey

Gölpınar
- Village
- Location within Turkey
- Coordinates: 37.682°N 38.398°E
- Country: Turkey
- Province: Adıyaman
- District: Adıyaman
- Population (2021): 68
- Time zone: UTC+3 (TRT)

Gölpınar (Kurdish: Golpinar) is a village in the Adıyaman District, Adıyaman Province, Turkey. The village is populated by Kurds of the Reşwan tribe and had a population of 68 in 2021.

The hamlet of Ocaklı is attached to the village.
