= Çakmaklar, Adıyaman =

Village in Adıyaman Province, Turkey

Çakmaklar
- Village
- Location within Turkey
- Coordinates: 37.546°N 38.206°E
- Country: Turkey
- Province: Adıyaman
- District: Adıyaman
- Population (2021): 259
- Time zone: UTC+3 (TRT)

Çakmaklar (Kurdish: Darbelik) is a village in the Adıyaman District, Adıyaman Province, Turkey. The village is populated by Kurds of the Molikan tribe and had a population of 259 in 2021.
