= Işıklı, Adıyaman =

Village in Adıyaman Province, Turkey

Işıklı
- Village
- Location within Turkey
- Coordinates: 37.447°N 38.235°E
- Country: Turkey
- Province: Adıyaman
- District: Adıyaman
- Population (2021): 126
- Time zone: UTC+3 (TRT)

Işıklı (Kurdish: Qemerdîn) is a village in the Adıyaman District, Adıyaman Province, Turkey. The village had a population of 126 in 2021.
