= Kayadibi, Adıyaman =

Village in Adıyaman Province, Turkey

Kayadibi
- Village
- Location within Turkey
- Coordinates: 37.920°N 38.412°E
- Country: Turkey
- Province: Adıyaman
- District: Adıyaman
- Population (2021): 99
- Time zone: UTC+3 (TRT)

Kayadibi is a village in the Adıyaman District, Adıyaman Province, Turkey. The village had a population of 99 in 2021.
