= Büyükkırıklı, Adıyaman =

Village in Adıyaman Province, Turkey

Büyükkırıklı
- Village
- Location within Turkey
- Coordinates: 37.818°N 38.158°E
- Country: Turkey
- Province: Adıyaman
- District: Adıyaman
- Population (2021): 73
- Time zone: UTC+3 (TRT)

Büyükkırıklı (Kurdish: Qirxî, Qirxîya reşik, Qirxiya gir) is a village in the Adıyaman District, Adıyaman Province, Turkey. The village is populated by Kurds of the Reşwan tribe and had a population of 73 in 2021.

The hamlet of Küçükkırıklı is attached to the village.
