= Güneşli, Adıyaman =

Village in Adıyaman Province, Turkey

Güneşli
- Village
- Location within Turkey
- Coordinates: 37.780°N 38.122°E
- Country: Turkey
- Province: Adıyaman
- District: Adıyaman
- Population (2021): 209
- Time zone: UTC+3 (TRT)

Güneşli (Kurdish: Lûf) is a village in the Adıyaman District, Adıyaman Province, Turkey. The village is populated by Kurds of the Reşwan tribe and had a population of 209 in 2021.

The hamlet of Ordu (Kurdish: Ordî) is attached to the village. Ordu is populated by Kurds of the Reşwan tribe.
