= Tut District =

- District
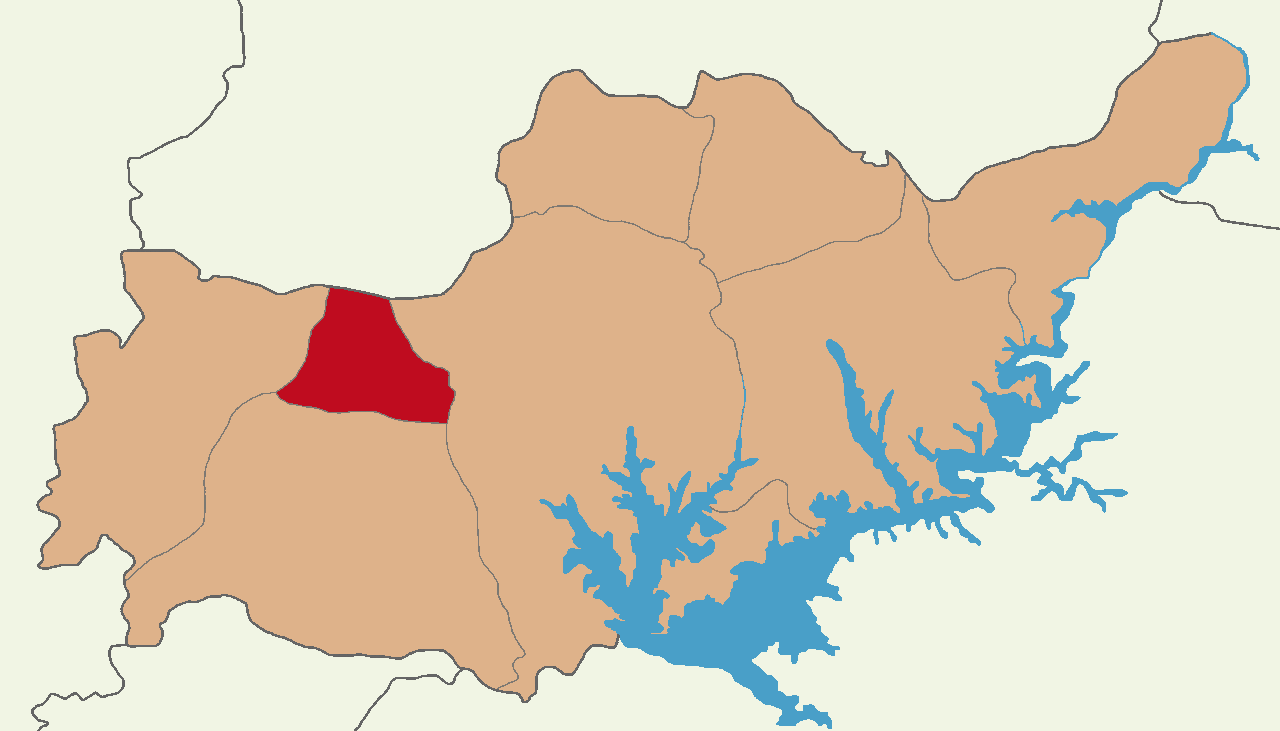
- Map showing Tut District in Adıyaman Province

- Location in Turkey
- Coordinates: 37°48′N 37°55′E
- Country: Turkey
- Province: Adıyaman
- Seat: Tut

Government
  - Kaymakam: Yunus Kızılgüneş
- Area: 290 km^{2} (110 sq mi)
- Population (2021): 9,686
  - Density: 33/km^{2} (87/sq mi)
- Time zone: UTC+3 (TRT)
- Website: www.samsat.gov.tr

Tut District is a district of Adıyaman Province of Turkey. Its seat is the town Tut. Its area is 290 km^{2}, and its population is 9,686 (2021). The Kaymakam is Yunus Kızılgüneş.

The district was established in 1990.

== Composition ==
There is 1 municipality in Tut District:

- Tut

There are 14 villages in Tut District:

- Akçatepe
- Boyundere
- Çiftlik
- Elçiler
- Havutlu
- Kaşlıca
- Köseli
- Meryemuşağı
- Öğütlü
- Tepecik
- Ünlüce
- Yalankoz
- Yaylımlı
- Yeşilyurt
