= Ağikan, Adıyaman =

Village in Adıyaman Province, Turkey

Ağikan
- Village
- Location within Turkey
- Coordinates: 37.858°N 38.314°E
- Country: Turkey
- Province: Adıyaman
- District: Adıyaman
- Population (2021): 164
- Time zone: UTC+3 (TRT)

Ağikan (Kurdish: Axîkan) is a village in the Adıyaman District, Adıyaman Province, Turkey. Populated by Kurds of the Kawan tribe, it had a population of 116 in 2021.
