= Uludam, Adıyaman =

Village in Adıyaman Province, Turkey

Uludam
- Village
- Location within Turkey
- Coordinates: 37.763°N 38.457°E
- Country: Turkey
- Province: Adıyaman
- District: Adıyaman
- Population (2021): 381
- Time zone: UTC+3 (TRT)

Uludam is a village in the Adıyaman District, Adıyaman Province, Turkey. The village is populated by Kurds of the Reşwan tribe and had a population of 381 in 2021.

The hamlet of Akyurt is attached to the village.
