= Yeşilova, Adıyaman =

Yeşilova
- Village
- Location within Turkey
- Coordinates: 37.604°N 38.155°E
- Country: Turkey
- Province: Adıyaman
- District: Adıyaman
- Population (2021): 96
- Time zone: UTC+3 (TRT)

Yeşilova (Kurdish: Koşin) is a village in the Adıyaman District, Adıyaman Province, Turkey. It is populated by Kurds of the Reşwan tribe and had a population of 96 in 2021.
