= Yarmakaya, Adıyaman =

Village in Adıyaman Province, Turkey

Yarmakaya
- Village
- Location within Turkey
- Coordinates: 37.716°N 38.169°E
- Country: Turkey
- Province: Adıyaman
- District: Adıyaman
- Population (2021): 864
- Time zone: UTC+3 (TRT)

Yarmakaya (Kurdish: Çeqelan) is a village in the Adıyaman District, Adıyaman Province, Turkey. The village is populated by Kurds of the Reşwan tribe and had a population of 864 in 2021.

The hamlets of Altıntop and Ürünce are attached to the village.
