= Kındırali, Adıyaman =

Village in Adıyaman Province, Turkey

Kındırali
- Village
- Location within Turkey
- Coordinates: 37.760°N 38.131°E
- Country: Turkey
- Province: Adıyaman
- District: Adıyaman
- Population (2021): 375
- Time zone: UTC+3 (TRT)

Kındırali (Kurdish: Qindiralî) is a village in the Adıyaman District, Adıyaman Province, Turkey. The village is populated by Kurds of the Reşwan tribe and had a population of 375 in 2021.

The hamlet of Çokpınar is attached to the village.
