= Tecir, Adıyaman =

Village in Adıyaman Province, Turkey

Tecir
- Village
- Location within Turkey
- Coordinates: 37.676°N 38.297°E
- Country: Turkey
- Province: Adıyaman
- District: Adıyaman
- Population (2021): 80
- Time zone: UTC+3 (TRT)

Tecir (Kurdish: Têcir) is a village in the Adıyaman District, Adıyaman Province, Turkey. The village had a population of 80 in 2021.
