= Dişbudak, Adıyaman =

Village in Adıyaman Province, Turkey

Dişbudak
- Village
- Location within Turkey
- Coordinates: 37.677°N 38.350°E
- Country: Turkey
- Province: Adıyaman
- District: Adıyaman
- Population (2021): 80
- Time zone: UTC+3 (TRT)

Dişbudak (Kurdish: Têşbidax) is a village in the Adıyaman District, Adıyaman Province, Turkey. The village is populated by Kurds of the Reşwan tribe and had a population of 80 in 2021.

The hamlets of Eski Ören and Tutluca are attached to the village.
