= Sarıkaya, Adıyaman =

Village in Adıyaman Province, Turkey

Sarıkaya
- Village
- Location within Turkey
- Coordinates: 37.978°N 38.176°E
- Country: Turkey
- Province: Adıyaman
- District: Adıyaman
- Population (2021): 176
- Time zone: UTC+3 (TRT)

Sarıkaya (Kurdish: Çîğ) is a village in the Adıyaman District, Adıyaman Province, Turkey. It is populated by Kurds of the Reşwan tribe and had a population of 176 in 2021.
