= Durukaynak, Adıyaman =

Village in Adıyaman Province, Turkey

Durukaynak
- Village
- Location within Turkey
- Coordinates: 37.789°N 38.136°E
- Country: Turkey
- Province: Adıyaman
- District: Adıyaman
- Population (2021): 264
- Time zone: UTC+3 (TRT)

Durukaynak (Kurdish: Pêşînîg) is a village in the Adıyaman District, Adıyaman Province, Turkey. The village is populated by Kurds of the Reşwan tribe and had a population of 264 in 2021.
