= Büklüm, Adıyaman =

Village in Adıyaman Province, Turkey

Büklüm
- Village
- Location within Turkey
- Coordinates: 37.753°N 38.087°E
- Country: Turkey
- Province: Adıyaman
- District: Adıyaman
- Population (2021): 280
- Time zone: UTC+3 (TRT)

Büklüm (Kurdish: Buklum) is a village in the Adıyaman District, Adıyaman Province, Turkey. The village is populated by Kurds of the Reşwan tribe and had a population of 280 in 2021.

The hamlet of Mürsel is attached to the village.
