= Terman, Adıyaman =

Village in Adıyaman Province, Turkey

Terman
- Village
- Location within Turkey
- Coordinates: 37.757°N 38.377°E
- Country: Turkey
- Province: Adıyaman
- District: Adıyaman
- Population (2021): 432
- Time zone: UTC+3 (TRT)

Terman (formerly Ardıçoluk) is a village in the Adıyaman District, Adıyaman Province, Turkey. The village is populated by Kurds of the Reşwan tribe and had a population of 432 in 2021.
