= Şemikan, Adıyaman =

Village in Adıyaman Province, Turkey

Şemikan
- Village
- Location within Turkey
- Coordinates: 37.884°N 38.291°E
- Country: Turkey
- Province: Adıyaman
- District: Adıyaman
- Population (2021): 109
- Time zone: UTC+3 (TRT)

Şemikan (also known as Senikan) is a village in the Adıyaman District, Adıyaman Province, Turkey. The village is populated by Kurds of the Kawan tribe and had a population of 109 in 2021.
