= Damlıca, Adıyaman =

Village in Adıyaman Province, Turkey

Damlıca
- Village
- Location within Turkey
- Coordinates: 37.460°N 38.255°E
- Country: Turkey
- Province: Adıyaman
- District: Adıyaman
- Population (2021): 166
- Time zone: UTC+3 (TRT)

Damlıca (Kurdish: Damlice) is a village in the Adıyaman District, Adıyaman Province, Turkey. The village had a population of 166 in 2021.
