= Yazıbaşı, Adıyaman =

Village in Adıyaman Province, Turkey

Yazıbaşı
- Village
- Location within Turkey
- Coordinates: 37.883°N 38.162°E
- Country: Turkey
- Province: Adıyaman
- District: Adıyaman
- Population (2021): 445
- Time zone: UTC+3 (TRT)

Yazıbaşı (Kurdish: Azikan) is a village in the Adıyaman District, Adıyaman Province, Turkey. The village is populated by Kurds of the Reşwan tribe and had a population of 445 in 2021.

The hamlets of Ağaçlı and Okçul are attached to the village.
