= Kızılcahöyük, Adıyaman =

Village in Adıyaman Province, Turkey

Kızılcahöyük
- Village
- Location within Turkey
- Coordinates: 37.687°N 38.166°E
- Country: Turkey
- Province: Adıyaman
- District: Adıyaman
- Population (2021): 290
- Time zone: UTC+3 (TRT)

Kızılcahöyük (Kurdish: Qizilcûg) is a village in the Adıyaman District, Adıyaman Province, Turkey. The village is populated by Kurds of the Reşwan tribe and had a population of 290 in 2021.
