= Ağcin, Adıyaman =

Village in Adıyaman Province, Turkey

Ağcin
- Village
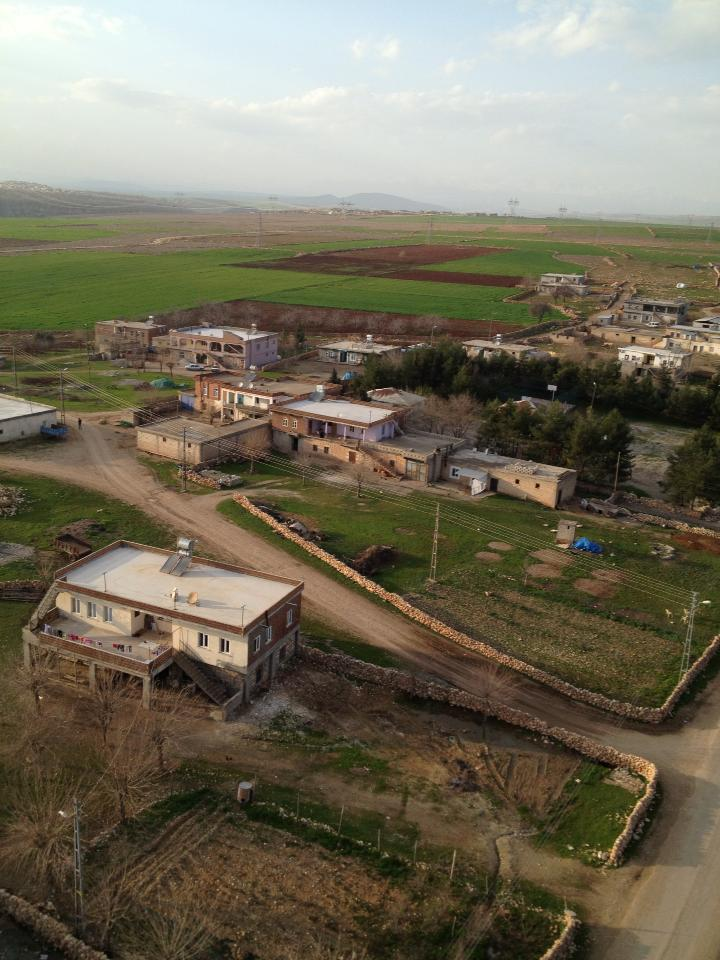

- Location within Turkey
- Coordinates: 37.470°N 38.183°E
- Country: Turkey
- Province: Adıyaman
- District: Adıyaman
- Population (2021): 397
- Time zone: UTC+3 (TRT)

Ağcin (Kurdish: Axçîn) is a village in the Adıyaman District, Adıyaman Province, Turkey. The village had a population of 397 in 2021.
