= Koçali, Adıyaman =

Village in Adıyaman Province, Turkey

Koçali
- Village
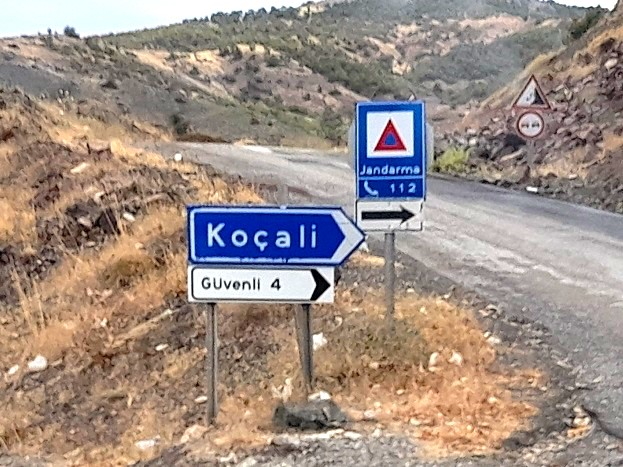
- A view from the village

- Location within Turkey
- Coordinates: 37.923°N 38.257°E
- Country: Turkey
- Province: Adıyaman
- District: Adıyaman
- Population (2021): 463
- Time zone: UTC+3 (TRT)

Koçali (Kurdish: Qocelî) is a village in the Adıyaman District, Adıyaman Province, Turkey. The village is populated by Kurds of the Reşwan tribe and had a population of 463 in 2021.

The hamlets of Güvenli, Kumuşderesi and Pamukderesi are attached to Koçali.
