= Yakup Taş =

Turkish politician (1959–2023)

Member of the Grand National Assembly
- In office 7 July 2018 – 7 February 2023
- Constituency: Adıyaman (2018)

Personal details
- Born: 16 June 1959 Uzunköy, Adıyaman, Turkey
- Died: 7 February 2023 (aged 63) Adıyaman, Turkey
- Cause of death: 2023 Turkey–Syria earthquake
- Party: Justice and Development Party (AKP)
- Children: 6
- Occupation: Politician

Yakup Taş (16 June 1959 – 7 February 2023) was a Turkish politician from the Justice and Development Party who was a member of the Grand National Assembly of Turkey from 2018 until his death. He represented the electorate of Adıyaman.

Taş was killed in the 2023 Turkey–Syria earthquake.

== Personal life ==
Taş was born in Uzunköy. He was married and had 6 children.

== See also ==
- 27th Parliament of Turkey
- List of members of the Grand National Assembly of Turkey who died in office
