= Börkenek, Adıyaman =

Village in Mardin Province, Turkey

Börkenek
- Village
- Location within Turkey
- Coordinates: 37.686°N 38.098°E
- Country: Turkey
- Province: Adıyaman
- District: Adıyaman
- Population (2021): 553
- Time zone: UTC+3 (TRT)

Börkenek (Kurdish: Baronek) is a village in the Adıyaman District, Adıyaman Province, Turkey. The village is populated by Kurds of the Reşwan tribe and had a population of 553.
