= Uzunköy, Adıyaman =

Village in Adıyaman Province, Turkey

Uzunköy
- Village
- Location within Turkey
- Coordinates: 37.909°N 38.119°E
- Country: Turkey
- Province: Adıyaman
- District: Adıyaman
- Population (2021): 243
- Time zone: UTC+3 (TRT)

Uzunköy (Kurdish: Dîlka) is a village in the Adıyaman District, Adıyaman Province, Turkey. The village is populated by Kurds of the Reşwan tribe and had a population of 243 in 2021.

== Notable people ==
- Yakup Taş
