= İpekli, Adıyaman =

Village in Adıyaman Province, Turkey

İpekli
- Village
- Location within Turkey
- Coordinates: 37.753°N 38.366°E
- Country: Turkey
- Province: Adıyaman
- District: Adıyaman
- Population (2021): 116
- Time zone: UTC+3 (TRT)

İpekli (Kurdish: Elifî) is a village in the Adıyaman District, Adıyaman Province, Turkey. The village is populated by Kurds of the Kawan tribe and had a population of 116 in 2021.
