= Ilıcak, Adıyaman =

Village in Adıyaman Province, Turkey

Ilıcak
- Village
- Location within Turkey
- Coordinates: 37.575°N 38.134°E
- Country: Turkey
- Province: Adıyaman
- District: Adıyaman
- Population (2021): 145
- Time zone: UTC+3 (TRT)

Ilıcak (Kurdish: Firlaz) is a village in the Adıyaman District, Adıyaman Province, Turkey. The village is populated by Kurds of the Balan tribe and had a population of 145 in 2021.

The hamlet of Yukarıkargı is attached to the village.
