= Göztepe, Adıyaman =

Village in Adıyaman Province, Turkey

Göztepe
- Village
- Location within Turkey
- Coordinates: 37.829°N 38.151°E
- Country: Turkey
- Province: Adıyaman
- District: Adıyaman
- Population (2021): 127
- Time zone: UTC+3 (TRT)

Göztepe is a village in the Adıyaman District, Adıyaman Province, Turkey. The village had a population of 127 in 2021.
