= Üçdirek, Adıyaman =

Village in Adıyaman Province, Turkey

Üçdirek
- Village
- Location in Turkey
- Coordinates: 37.524°N 38.148°E
- Country: Turkey
- Province: Adıyaman
- District: Adıyaman
- Population (2021): 11
- Time zone: UTC+3 (TRT)

Üçdirek (Kurdish: Kîkan) is a village in the Adıyaman District, Adıyaman Province, Turkey. The village is populated by Kurds of the Berazî tribe and had a population of 11 in 2021.
