= Akçalı, Adıyaman =

Akçalı
- Village
- Location within Turkey
- Coordinates: 37°51′N 38°12′E
- Country: Turkey
- Province: Adıyaman
- District: Adıyaman
- Population (2021): 244
- Time zone: UTC+3 (TRT)

Akçalı (Kurdish: Axçelî) is a village in the Adıyaman District, Adıyaman Province, Turkey. The village is populated by Kurds of the Reşwan tribe and had a population of 244 in 2021.
