= Malpınarı, Adıyaman =

Village in Adıyaman Province, Turkey

Malpınarı
- Village
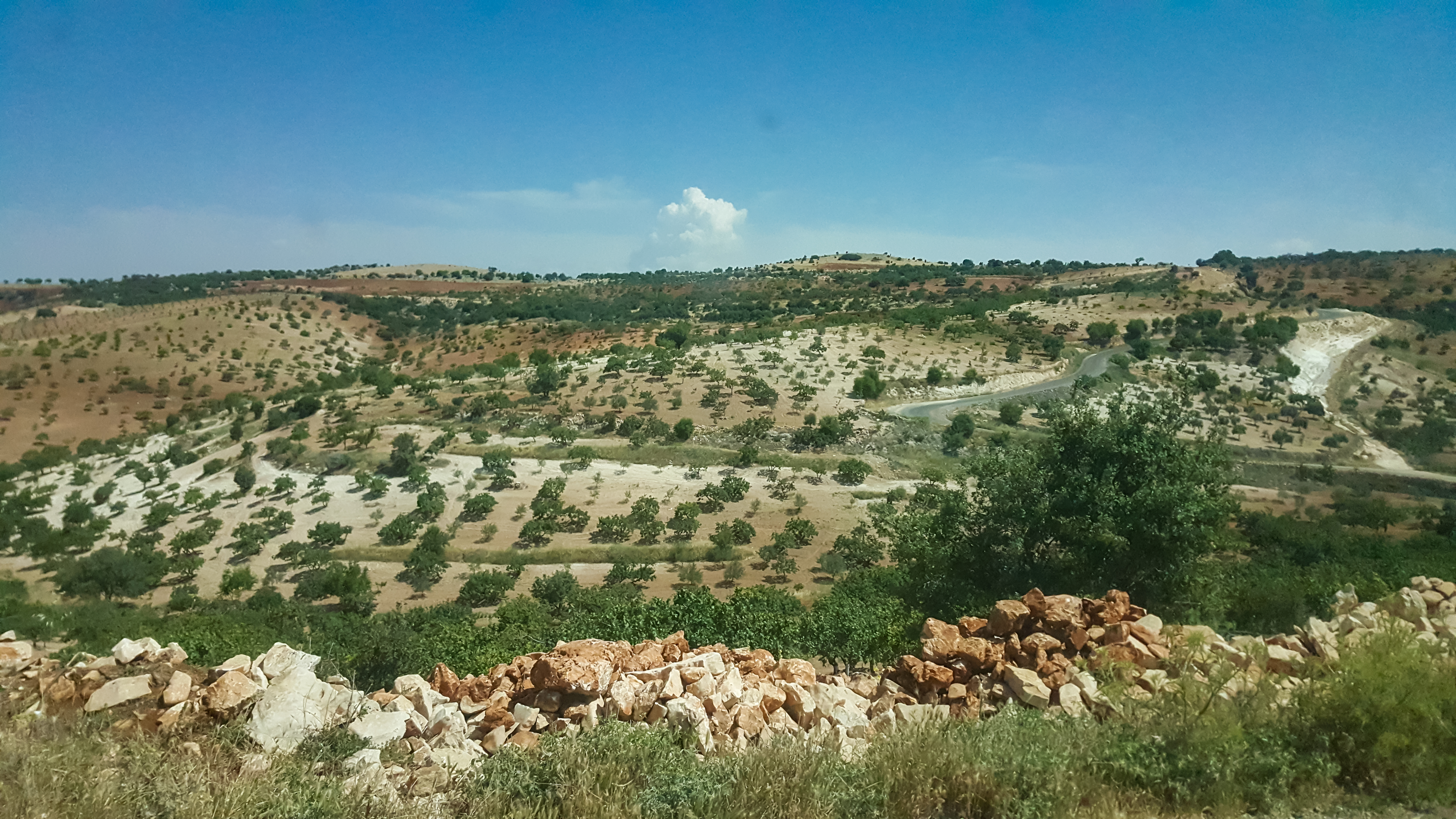

- Location within Turkey
- Coordinates: 37.509°N 38.152°E
- Country: Turkey
- Province: Adıyaman
- District: Adıyaman
- Population (2021): 110
- Time zone: UTC+3 (TRT)

Malpınarı (Kurdish: Malpîngar) is a village in the Adıyaman District, Adıyaman Province, Turkey. Its population is 110 (2021). Situated on the eastern bank of the Göksu River, the location is roughly 22 kilometres from Akpınar. Malpınar is 8 km from Göksu Çayı on the east bank.
