= Kalburcu, Adıyaman =

Village in Adıyaman Province, Turkey

Kalburcu
- Village
- Location within Turkey
- Coordinates: 37.838°N 38.393°E
- Country: Turkey
- Province: Adıyaman
- District: Adıyaman
- Population (2021): 192
- Time zone: UTC+3 (TRT)

Kalburcu (Kurdish: Xalbêrcî) is a village in the Adıyaman District, Adıyaman Province, Turkey. The village is populated by Kurds of the Kawan tribe and had a population of 192 in 2021.
