= Ziyaretpayamlı, Adıyaman =

Village in Adıyaman Province, Turkey

Ziyaretpayamlı
- Village
- Location within Turkey
- Coordinates: 37.769°N 38.341°E
- Country: Turkey
- Province: Adıyaman
- District: Adıyaman
- Population (2021): 47
- Time zone: UTC+3 (TRT)

Ziyaretpayamlı (Kurdish: Ziyaret) is a village in the Adıyaman District, Adıyaman Province, Turkey. The village is populated by Kurds of the Reşwan tribe and had a population of 47 2021.
