= Boztepe, Adıyaman =

Village in Adıyaman Province, Turkey

Boztepe
- Village
- Location within Turkey
- Coordinates: 37°43′56″N 38°29′36″E
- Country: Turkey
- Province: Adıyaman
- District: Adıyaman
- Population (2021): 155
- Time zone: UTC+3 (TRT)

Boztepe (Kurdish: Xozgîrt) is a village in the Adıyaman District, Adıyaman Province, Turkey. The village is populated by Kurds of the Reşwan tribe and had a population of 155 in 2021.

The hamlet of Köklü is attached to the village.
