= Karagöl, Adıyaman =

Village in Adıyaman Province, Turkey

Karagöl
- Village
- Location within Turkey
- Coordinates: 37.721°N 38.138°E
- Country: Turkey
- Province: Adıyaman
- District: Adıyaman
- Population (2021): 414
- Time zone: UTC+3 (TRT)

Akçalı (Kurdish: Axdîkan) is a village in the Adıyaman District, Adıyaman Province, Turkey. The village is populated by Kurds of the Balan and Reşwan tribes and had a population of 244 in 2021.

The hamlet of Gölcük is attached to the village.
