= Çamyurdu, Adıyaman =

Village in Adıyaman Province, Turkey

Çamyurdu
- Village
- Location within Turkey
- Coordinates: 37.848°N 38.118°E
- Country: Turkey
- Province: Adıyaman
- District: Adıyaman
- Population (2021): 306
- Time zone: UTC+3 (TRT)

Çamyurdu (Kurdish: Gomik) is a village in the Adıyaman District, Adıyaman Province, Turkey. The village is populated by Kurds of the Reşwan tribe and had a population of 306 in 2021.
