= Girik, Adıyaman =

Village in Adıyaman Province, Turkey

Girik
- Village
- Location within Turkey
- Coordinates: 37.841°N 38.416°E
- Country: Turkey
- Province: Adıyaman
- District: Adıyaman
- Population (2021): 246
- Time zone: UTC+3 (TRT)

Girik (formerly Boğazözü) is a village in the Adıyaman District, Adıyaman Province, Turkey. The village is populated by Kurds of the Reşwan tribe and had a population of 246 in 2021.

The hamlet of Doruk is attached to Girik.
