= Kayalı, Adıyaman =

Village in Adıyaman Province, Turkey

Kayalı
- Village
- Location within Turkey
- Coordinates: 37.590°N 38.117°E
- Country: Turkey
- Province: Adıyaman
- District: Adıyaman
- Population (2021): 25
- Time zone: UTC+3 (TRT)

Kayalı is a village in the Adıyaman District, Adıyaman Province, Turkey. The village had a population of 25 in 2021.
