= Kızılcapınar, Adıyaman =

Village in Adıyaman Province, Turkey

Kızılcapınar
- Village
- Location within Turkey
- Coordinates: 37.724°N 38.354°E
- Country: Turkey
- Province: Adıyaman
- District: Adıyaman
- Population (2021): 413
- Time zone: UTC+3 (TRT)

Kızılcapınar (Kurdish: Qicnepinar) is a village in the Adıyaman District, Adıyaman Province, Turkey. It is populated by Kurds of the Reşwan tribe and had a population of 413 in 2021.
