= Alibey, Adıyaman =

Village in Adıyaman Province, Turkey

Alibey
- Village
- Location within Turkey
- Coordinates: 37.755°N 38.476°E
- Country: Turkey
- Province: Adıyaman
- District: Adıyaman
- Population (2021): 101
- Time zone: UTC+3 (TRT)

Alibey (Kurdish: Kulaflig) is a village in the Adıyaman District, Adıyaman Province, Turkey. It is populated by Kurds of the Reşwan tribe and had a population of 101 in 2021.
