= Adıyaman District =

- District
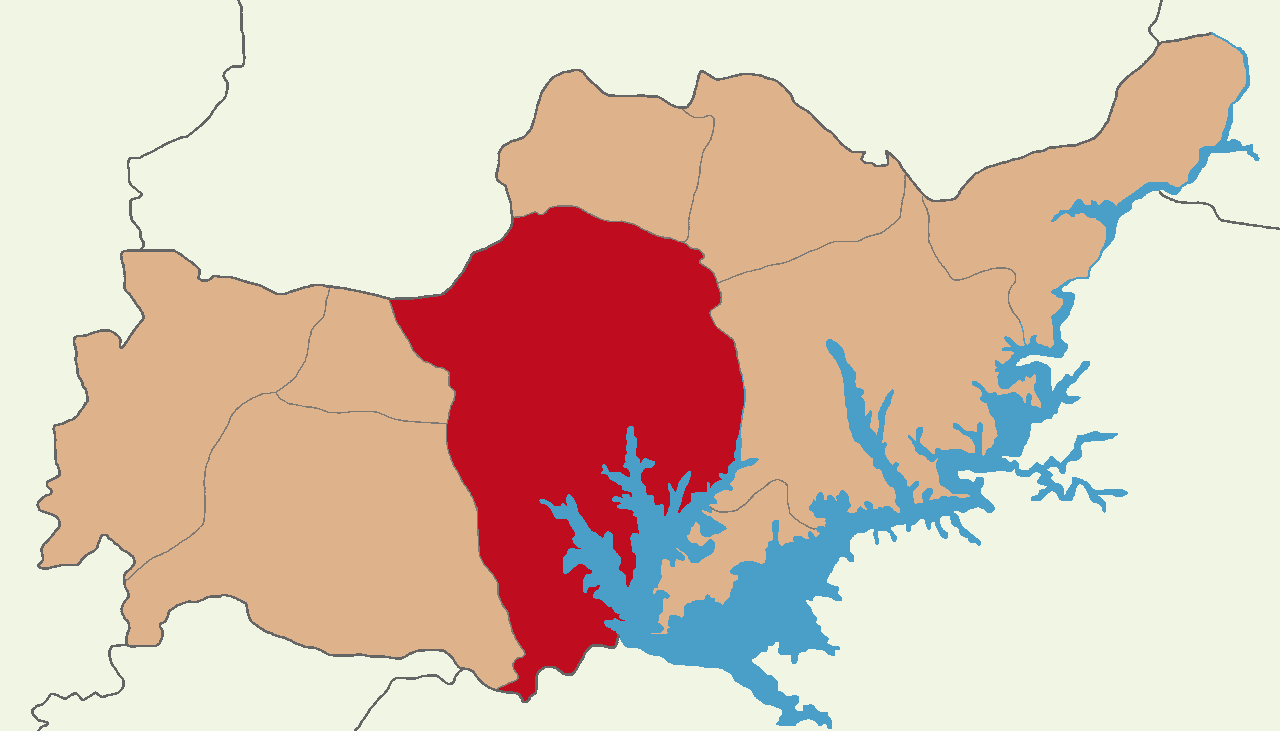
- Map showing Adıyaman District in Adıyaman Province

- Location in Turkey
- Coordinates: 37°46′N 38°17′E
- Country: Turkey
- Province: Adıyaman Province
- Seat: Adıyaman
- Area: 1,814 km^{2} (700 sq mi)
- Population (2021): 312,207
  - Density: 172.1/km^{2} (445.8/sq mi)
- Time zone: UTC+3 (TRT)

Adıyaman District (Turkish: merkez ilçe, meaning "central district") is a district of Adıyaman Province of Turkey. Its seat is the city Adıyaman. Its area is 1,814 km^{2}, and its population is 312,207 (2021).

== Composition ==
There are 3 municipalities in Adıyaman District:

- Adıyaman
- Kömür
- Yaylakonak

There are 135 villages in Adıyaman District:

- 100. Yıl
- Ağaçkonak
- Ağcin
- Ağikan
- Ağveren
- Ahmethoca
- Akçalı
- Akdere
- Akhisar
- Akpınar
- Akyazı
- Albet
- Alibey
- Atakent
- Ataköy
- Aydınlar
- Bağdere
- Bağlıca
- Bağpınar
- Bağpınar Kuyucak
- Başpınar
- Battalhüyük
- Bebek
- Bozatlı
- Bozhüyük
- Boztepe
- Börkenek
- Büklüm
- Büyükkavaklı
- Büyükkırıklı
- Çınarik
- Çakmaklar
- Çamgazi
- Çamlıca
- Çamyurdu
- Çatalağaç
- Çayırlı
- Çaylı
- Çemberlitaş
- Çobandede
- Damdırmaz
- Damlıca
- Dardağan
- Davuthan
- Derinsu
- Dişbudak
- Doğanlı
- Doyran
- Durak
- Durukaynak
- Düzce
- Ekinci
- Elmacık
- Esence
- Eskihüsnümansur
- Girik
- Gökçay
- Gölpınar
- Gözebaşı
- Göztepe
- Gümüşkaya
- Güneşli
- Güzelyurt
- Hacıhalil
- Hasancık
- Hasankendi
- Ilıcak
- Işıklı
- İncebağ
- İnceler
- İpekli
- Kalburcu
- Karaağaç
- Karagöl
- Karahöyük
- Karakoç
- Kaşköy
- Kavak
- Kayacık
- Kayadibi
- Kayalı
- Kayaönü
- Kemerkaya
- Kındırali
- Kızılcahöyük
- Kızılcapınar
- Koçali
- Koruköy
- Kozan
- Kuşakkaya
- Kuştepe
- Kuyucak
- Kuyulu
- Küçükhasancık
- Külafhüyük
- Lokman
- Malpınarı
- Mestan
- Olgunlar
- Oluklu
- Ormaniçi
- Palanlı
- Paşamezrası
- Payamlı
- Pınaryayla
- Rezip
- Sarıharman
- Sarıkaya
- Serhatlı
- Şemikan
- Şerefli
- Taşgedik
- Taşpınar
- Tecir
- Tekpınar
- Terman
- Toptepe
- Uğurca
- Uludam
- Uzunköy
- Uzunpınar
- Üçdirek
- Varlık
- Yarmakaya
- Yayladamı
- Yazıbaşı
- Yazıca
- Yazlık
- Yedioluk
- Yenice
- Yenigüven
- Yeniköy
- Yeşilova
- Zey
- Ziyaretpayamlı
