= Çamgazi, Adıyaman =

Çamgazi
- Village
- Location within Turkey
- Coordinates: 37.677°N 38.133°E
- Country: Turkey
- Province: Adıyaman
- District: Adıyaman
- Population (2021): 205
- Time zone: UTC+3 (TRT)

Çamgazi (Kurdish: Çamxazî) is a village in the Adıyaman District, Adıyaman Province, Turkey. The village is populated by Kurds of the Reşwan tribe and had a population of 205 in 2021.
