= Eskihüsnümansur, Adıyaman =

Village in Adıyaman Province, Turkey

Eskihüsnümansur
- Village
- Location within Turkey
- Coordinates: 37.690°N 38.348°E
- Country: Turkey
- Province: Adıyaman
- District: Adıyaman
- Population (2021): 42
- Time zone: UTC+3 (TRT)

Eskihüsnümansur (Kurdish: Hisnamansûra kevin) is a village in the Adıyaman District, Adıyaman Province, Turkey. The village is populated by Kurds of the Reşwan tribe and had a population of 42 in 2021.
