= Koruköy, Adıyaman =

Village in Adıyaman Province, Turkey

Koruköy
- Village
- Location within Turkey
- Coordinates: 37.845°N 38.285°E
- Country: Turkey
- Province: Adıyaman
- District: Adıyaman
- Population (2021): 131
- Time zone: UTC+3 (TRT)

Koruköy (Kurdish: Qor) is a village in the Adıyaman District, Adıyaman Province, Turkey. The village is populated by Kurds of the Kawan tribe and had a population of 131 in 2021.
