= Bebek, Adıyaman =

Village in Adıyaman Province, Turkey

Bebek
- Village
- Location within Turkey
- Coordinates: 37.531°N 38.258°E
- Country: Turkey
- Province: Adıyaman
- District: Adıyaman
- Population (2021): 349
- Time zone: UTC+3 (TRT)

Bebek (Kurdish: Bebeg) is a village in the Adıyaman District, Adıyaman Province, Turkey. The village is populated by Kurds of the Molikan tribe and had a population of 349 in 2021.

The hamlets of Çömlekçi, Ekinciler and Yeşilce are attached to the village.
