= Boyundere, Tut =

Village in Adıyaman Province, Turkey

Boyundere
- Village
- Location within Turkey
- Coordinates: 37.769°N 37.939°E
- Country: Turkey
- Province: Adıyaman
- District: Tut
- Population (2021): 703
- Time zone: UTC+3 (TRT)

Boyundere is a village in the Tut District, Adıyaman Province, Turkey. The village is populated by Turkmens and had a population of 703 in 2021.
