= Kaşlıca, Tut =

Village in Adıyaman Province, Turkey

Kaşlıca
- Village
- Location within Turkey
- Coordinates: 37.802°N 37.974°E
- Country: Turkey
- Province: Adıyaman
- District: Tut
- Population (2021): 1,315
- Time zone: UTC+3 (TRT)

Kaşlıca is a village in the Tut District, Adıyaman Province, Turkey. The village is populated by Turkmens and had a population of 1,315 in 2021.
