= Tut, Turkey =

Tut
- Municipality
- Location in Turkey
- Coordinates: 37°47′48″N 37°54′54″E
- Country: Turkey
- Province: Adıyaman
- District: Tut

Government
  - Mayor: Mehmet Kılıç (CHP)
- Elevation: 1,100 m (3,600 ft)
- Population (2021): 3,388
- Time zone: UTC+3 (TRT)
- Postal code: 02350
- Website: www.tut.bel.tr

Tut is a town of Adıyaman Province of Turkey, to the north-west of the city of Adıyaman in the range of the Taurus Mountains called the Haci Muhammed. It is the seat of Tut District. Its population is 3,388 (2021). The mayor is Mehmet Kılıc for the Republican People's Party (CHP).

The town is divided into the neighborhoods of Ayniye, Bulanık, Cumhuriyet, Çamlıca, Fethiye, Reşadiye and Salah.
