= Tekpınar, Adıyaman =

Village in Adıyaman Province, Turkey

Tekpınar
- Village
- Location within Turkey
- Coordinates: 37.768°N 38.178°E
- Country: Turkey
- Province: Adıyaman
- District: Adıyaman
- Population (2021): 472
- Time zone: UTC+3 (TRT)

Tekpınar (Kurdish: Kulikreş) is a village in the Adıyaman District, Adıyaman Province, Turkey. The village is populated by Kurds of the Kawan tribe, and had a population of 472 in 2021.

The hamlet of Narlık is attached to the village.
