= Damdırmaz, Adıyaman =

Village in Adıyaman Province, Turkey

Damdırmaz
- Village
- Location within Turkey
- Coordinates: 37.820°N 38.049°E
- Country: Turkey
- Province: Adıyaman
- District: Adıyaman
- Population (2021): 352
- Time zone: UTC+3 (TRT)

Damdırmaz (Kurdish: Tolmez) is a village in the Adıyaman District, Adıyaman Province, Turkey. It is populated by Kurds of the Balan tribe and had a population of 352 in 2021.
