= Doğanlı, Adıyaman =

Village in Adıyaman Province, Turkey

Doğanlı
- Village
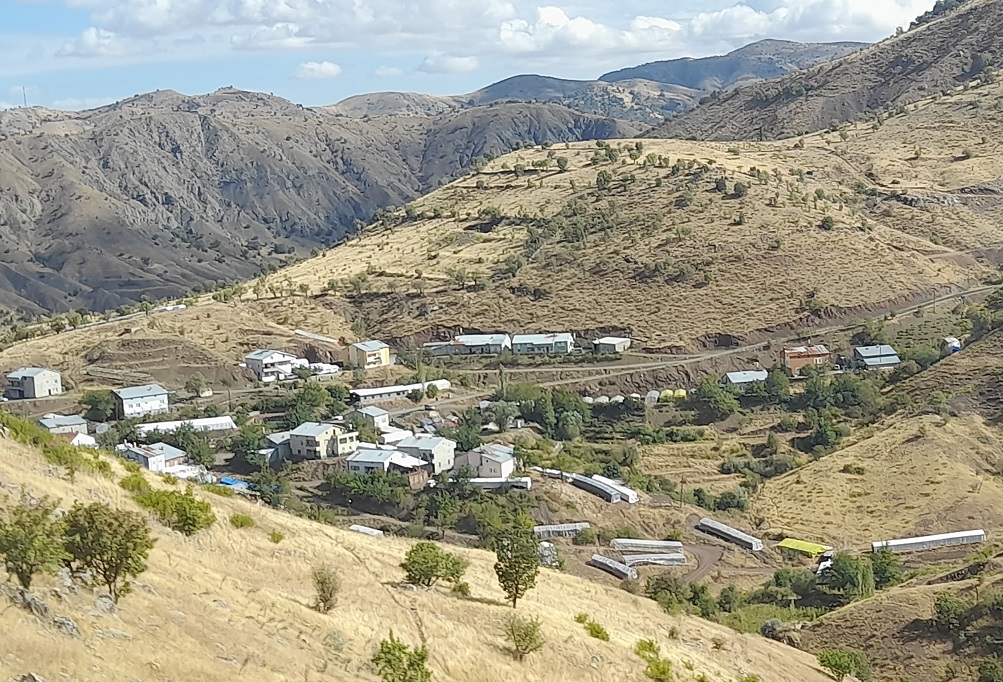
- A view from the village

- Location within Turkey
- Coordinates: 37.965°N 38.304°E
- Country: Turkey
- Province: Adıyaman
- District: Adıyaman
- Population (2021): 330
- Time zone: UTC+3 (TRT)

Doğanlı (Kurdish: Şeyînkan) is a village in the Adıyaman District, Adıyaman Province, Turkey. The village is populated by Kurds of the Kawan tribe and had a population of 330 in 2021.

The hamlets of Aksu, Bulom and Madenli are attached to the village.
