= Uzunpınar, Adıyaman =

Village in Adıyaman Province, Turkey

Uzunpınar
- Village
- Location within Turkey
- Coordinates: 37.790°N 38.471°E
- Country: Turkey
- Province: Adıyaman
- District: Adıyaman
- Population (2021): 433
- Time zone: UTC+3 (TRT)

Uzunpınar (Kurdish: Çarkezî) is a village in the Adıyaman District, Adıyaman Province, Turkey. It is populated by Kurds of the Kawan tribe and had a population of 433 in 2021.

The hamlet of Gözecik is attached to the village.
