= Düzce, Nusaybin =

Village in Mardin Province, Turkey

Düzce
- Neighbourhood
- Location in Turkey
- Coordinates: 37.172°N 41.310°E
- Country: Turkey
- Province: Mardin
- District: Nusaybin
- Population (2021): 104
- Time zone: UTC+3 (TRT)

Düzce (Kurdish: Sirinçk) is a neighbourhood in the municipality and district of Nusaybin, Mardin Province in Turkey. The village is populated by Kurds of the Mizizex tribe and had a population of 104 in 2021.
