= Havutlu, Tut =

Village in Adıyaman Province, Turkey

Havutlu
- Village
- Location within Turkey
- Coordinates: 37.769°N 37.912°E
- Country: Turkey
- Province: Adıyaman
- District: Tut
- Population (2021): 292
- Time zone: UTC+3 (TRT)

Havutlu is a village in the Tut District, Adıyaman Province, Turkey. The village is populated by Turkmens and had a population of 292 in 2021.
