= Yalankoz, Tut =

Village in Adıyaman Province, Turkey

Yalankoz
- Village
- Location within Turkey
- Coordinates: 37.803°N 38.034°E
- Country: Turkey
- Province: Adıyaman
- District: Tut
- Population (2021): 439
- Time zone: UTC+3 (TRT)

Yalankoz (Kurdish: Yalanqoz) is a village in the Tut District, Adıyaman Province, Turkey. It is populated by Kurds of the Balan tribe and had a population of 439 in 2021.
