= Taşpınar, Adıyaman =

Village in Adıyaman Province, Turkey

Taşpınar
- Village
- Location within Turkey
- Coordinates: 37.694°N 38.296°E
- Country: Turkey
- Province: Adıyaman
- District: Adıyaman
- Population (2021): 390
- Time zone: UTC+3 (TRT)

Taşpınar (Kurdish: Hosurge) is a village in the Adıyaman District, Adıyaman Province, Turkey. The village is populated by Kurds of the Kawan tribe and had a population of 390 in 2021.

The hamlet of Vartana is attached to the village.
