= Çaylı, Adıyaman =

Village in Adıyaman Province, Turkey

Çaylı
- Village
- Location within Turkey
- Coordinates: 37.651°N 38.386°E
- Country: Turkey
- Province: Adıyaman
- District: Adıyaman
- Population (2021): 65
- Time zone: UTC+3 (TRT)

Çaylı (Kurdish: Kanîkûrk) is a village in the Adıyaman District, Adıyaman Province, Turkey. Its population is 65 (2021).
