= Kuşakkaya, Adıyaman =

Village in Adıyaman Province, Turkey

Kuşakkaya
- Village
- Location within Turkey
- Coordinates: 37.812°N 38.133°E
- Country: Turkey
- Province: Adıyaman
- District: Adıyaman
- Population (2021): 365
- Time zone: UTC+3 (TRT)

Kuşakkaya (Kurdish: Şêxler) is a village in the Adıyaman District, Adıyaman Province, Turkey. The village is populated by Kurds of the Kawan tribe and had a population of 365 in 2021.
