= Öğütlü, Tut =

Village in Adıyaman Province, Turkey

Öğütlü
- Village
- Location within Turkey
- Coordinates: 37.7700°N 38.0014°E
- Country: Turkey
- Province: Adıyaman
- District: Tut
- Population (2021): 543
- Time zone: UTC+3 (TRT)

Öğütlü is a village in the Tut District, Adıyaman Province, Turkey. Its population is 543 (2021).
