= İnceler, Adıyaman =

Village in Adıyaman Province, Turkey

İnceler
- Village
- Location within Turkey
- Coordinates: 37.773°N 38.429°E
- Country: Turkey
- Province: Adıyaman
- District: Adıyaman
- Population (2021): 121
- Time zone: UTC+3 (TRT)

İnceler (Kurdish: Tirintîl) is a village in the Adıyaman District, Adıyaman Province, Turkey. Its population is 121 (2021).
