= Kaşköy, Adıyaman =

Village in Adıyaman Province, Turkey

Kaşköy
- Village
- Location within Turkey
- Coordinates: 37.914°N 38.418°E
- Country: Turkey
- Province: Adıyaman
- District: Adıyaman
- Population (2021): 314
- Time zone: UTC+3 (TRT)

Kaşköy (Kurdish: Sarmikan) is a village in the Adıyaman District, Adıyaman Province, Turkey. The village is populated by Kurds of the Kawan tribe and had a population of 314 in 2021.
