= Yaylakonak, Adıyaman =

Yaylakonak
- Municipality
- Location in Turkey
- Coordinates: 37°49′30″N 38°04′49″E
- Country: Turkey
- Province: Adıyaman
- District: Adıyaman
- Population (2021): 1,736
- Time zone: UTC+3 (TRT)

Yaylakonak (Kurdish: Balyan) is a town (belde) and municipality in the Adıyaman District, Adıyaman Province, Turkey. The village is populated by Kurds of the Balan tribe and had a population of 1,736 in 2021.
