= Hasancık, Adıyaman =

Village in Adıyaman Province, Turkey

Hasancık
- Village
- Location within Turkey
- Coordinates: 37.774°N 38.443°E
- Country: Turkey
- Province: Adıyaman
- District: Adıyaman
- Population (2021): 527
- Time zone: UTC+3 (TRT)

Hasancık (Kurdish: Hesencix) is a village in the Adıyaman District, Adıyaman Province, Turkey. It is populated by Kurds of the Kawan tribe and had a population of 527 in 2021. Before the 2013 reorganisation, it was a town (belde).
