= Karahöyük, Adıyaman =

Village in Adıyaman Province, Turkey

Karahöyük
- Village
- Location within Turkey
- Coordinates: 37.724°N 38.403°E
- Country: Turkey
- Province: Adıyaman
- District: Adıyaman
- Population (2021): 434
- Time zone: UTC+3 (TRT)

Karahöyük (Kurdish: Qerûq) is a village in the Adıyaman District, Adıyaman Province, Turkey. It is populated by Kurds of the Kawan tribe and had a population of 434 in 2021.
