= Tepecik, Tut =

Village in Adıyaman Province, Turkey

Tepecik
- Village
- Location within Turkey
- Coordinates: 37.800°N 38.053°E
- Country: Turkey
- Province: Adıyaman
- District: Tut
- Population (2021): 270
- Time zone: UTC+3 (TRT)

Tepecik (Kurdish: Terentil) is a village in the Tut District, Adıyaman Province, Turkey. The village is populated by Kurds and had a population of 270 in 2021.

== History ==
The village was populated by Kurds of the Kawan tribe in 1560.
