= Akdere, Adıyaman =

Village in Adıyaman Province, Turkey

Akdere
- Village
- Location within Turkey
- Coordinates: 37°27′43″N 38°12′59″E
- Country: Turkey
- Province: Adıyaman
- District: Adıyaman
- Population (2021): 175
- Time zone: UTC+3 (TRT)

Akdere (Kurdish: Nalegewr) is a village in the Adıyaman District, Adıyaman Province, Turkey. It is populated by Kurds of the Molikan tribe and had a population of 175 in 2021.

The hamlets of Akıncı, Akyazı and Yuvacık are attached to Akdere.
