= Gözebaşı, Adıyaman =

Village in Adıyaman Province, Turkey

Gözebaşı
- Village
- Location within Turkey
- Coordinates: 37.783°N 38.399°E
- Country: Turkey
- Province: Adıyaman
- District: Adıyaman
- Population (2021): 436
- Time zone: UTC+3 (TRT)

Gözebaşı (Kurdish: Xosmosî) is a village in the Adıyaman District, Adıyaman Province, Turkey. The village is populated by Kurds of the Kawan tribe and had a population of 436 in 2021.

The hamlets of Akbulut, Subaşı and Zorköy are attached to the village.
