= Hacıhalil, Adıyaman =

Village in Adıyaman Province, Turkey

Hacıhalil
- Village
- Location within Turkey
- Coordinates: 37.663°N 38.255°E
- Country: Turkey
- Province: Adıyaman
- District: Adıyaman
- Population (2021): 241
- Time zone: UTC+3 (TRT)

Hacıhalil is a village in the Adıyaman District, Adıyaman Province, Turkey. Its population is 241 (2021).

The hamlets of Arslanoğlu and Kıvırcık are attached to the village.
