= Bağlıca, Adıyaman =

Village in Adıyaman Province, Turkey

Bağlıca
- Village
- Location within Turkey
- Coordinates: 37.935°N 38.276°E
- Country: Turkey
- Province: Adıyaman
- District: Adıyaman
- Population (2021): 326
- Time zone: UTC+3 (TRT)

Bağlıca (Kurdish: Bûwikan) is a village in the Adıyaman District, Adıyaman Province, Turkey. The village is populated by Kurds of the Kawan tribe and had a population of 326 in 2021.

The hamlets of Seyitevleri and Sincik are attached to the village.
