= Çobandede, Adıyaman =

Village in Adıyaman Province, Turkey

Çobandede
- Village
- Location within Turkey
- Coordinates: 37.575°N 38.338°E
- Country: Turkey
- Province: Adıyaman
- District: Adıyaman
- Population (2021): 74
- Time zone: UTC+3 (TRT)

Çobandede is a village in the Adıyaman District, Adıyaman Province, Turkey. Its population is 74 (2021).
