= Mestan, Adıyaman =

Village in Adıyaman Province, Turkey

Mestan
- Village
- Location within Turkey
- Coordinates: 37.988°N 38.212°E
- Country: Turkey
- Province: Adıyaman
- District: Adıyaman
- Population (2021): 250
- Time zone: UTC+3 (TRT)

Mestan is a village in the Adıyaman District, Adıyaman Province, Turkey. The village is populated by Kurds of the Kawan tribe and had a population of 250 in 2021.
