= Kuyular, Nusaybin =

Village in Mardin Province, Turkey

Kuyular
- Neighbourhood
- Location in Turkey
- Coordinates: 37.298°N 41.121°E
- Country: Turkey
- Province: Mardin
- District: Nusaybin
- Population (2021): 432
- Time zone: UTC+3 (TRT)

Kuyular (Kurdish: Cibilgrav) is a neighbourhood in the municipality and district of Nusaybin, Mardin Province in Turkey. The village is populated by Kurds of the Omerkan tribe and has a population of 432 in 2021.
