= Aydinlar, Shabran =

Aydinlar
- Location within Azerbaijan
- Coordinates: 40°59′46″N 48°54′34″E
- Country: Azerbaijan
- Rayon: Davachi
- Time zone: UTC+4 (AZT)
  - Summer (DST): UTC+5 (AZT)

Aydinlar (also, Aydynlar) is a village in the Shabran District of Azerbaijan.
