= Battalhüyük, Adıyaman =

Village in Adıyaman Province, Turkey

Battalhüyük
- Village
- Location within Turkey
- Coordinates: 37.62°N 38.185°E
- Country: Turkey
- Province: Adıyaman
- District: Adıyaman
- Population (2021): 232
- Time zone: UTC+3 (TRT)

Battalhüyük (Kurdish: Betalûg) is a village in the Adıyaman District, Adıyaman Province, Turkey. Its population is 232 (2021).

The hamlets of Ballıca, Doluca, Karahurç and Yıldızlı are attached to the village.
