= Kuyucak, Adıyaman =

Village in Adıyaman Province, Turkey

Kuyucak
- Village
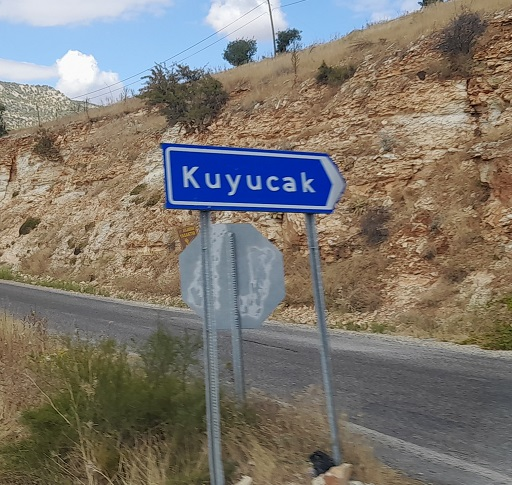
- A view from the village

- Location within Turkey
- Coordinates: 37.862°N 38.344°E
- Country: Turkey
- Province: Adıyaman
- District: Adıyaman
- Population (2021): 265
- Time zone: UTC+3 (TRT)

Kuyucak (Kurdish: Malêbîrê) is a village in the Adıyaman District, Adıyaman Province, Turkey. The village is populated by Kurds of the Kawan tribe and had a population of 265 in 2021.

The hamlet of Armutlu is attached to Kuyucak.
