= Akpınar, Adıyaman =

Village in Adıyaman Province, Turkey

Akpınar
- Village
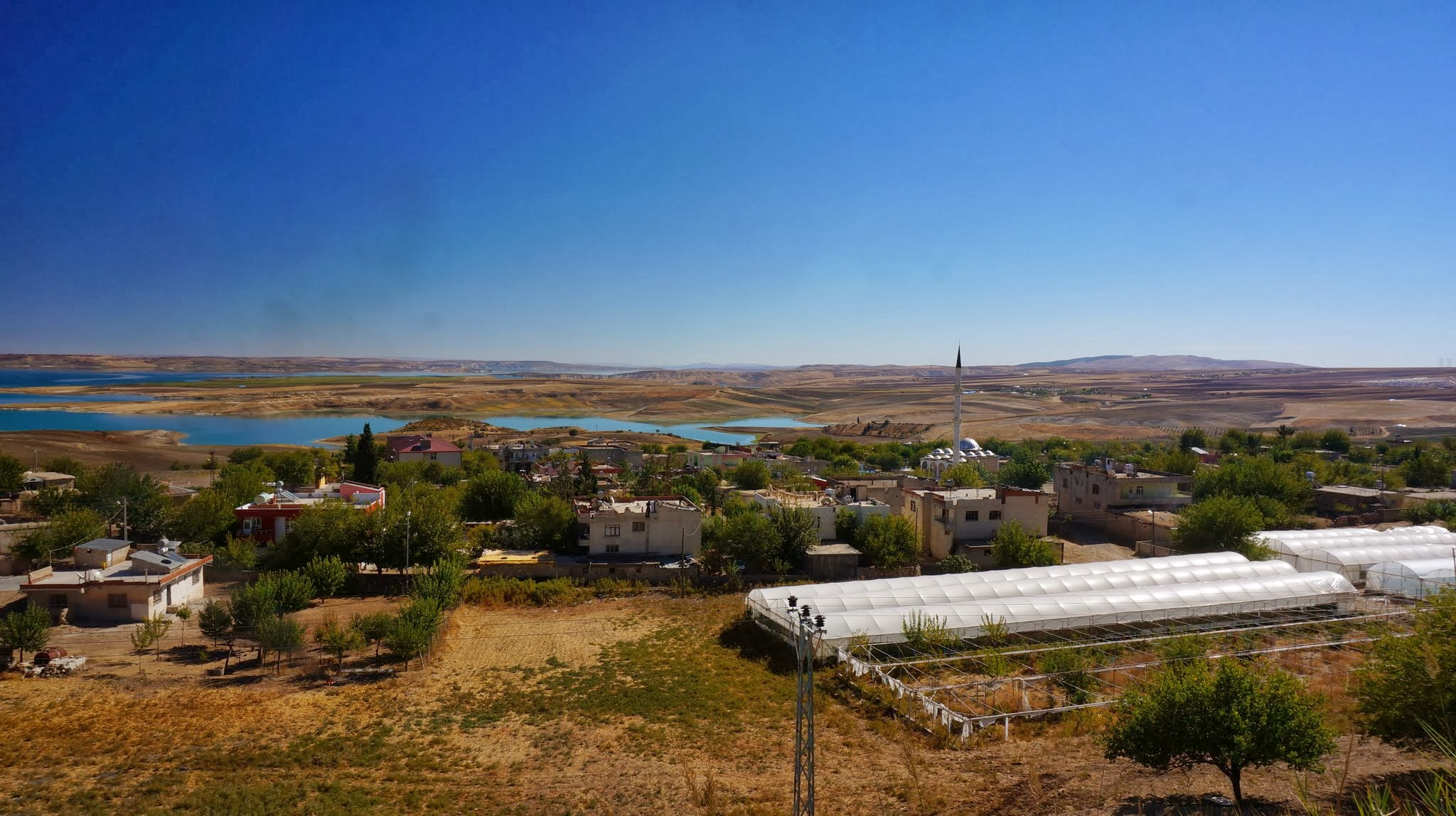

- Location within Turkey
- Coordinates: 37°34′24″N 38°13′17″E
- Country: Turkey
- Province: Adıyaman
- District: Adıyaman
- Elevation: 573 m (1,880 ft)
- Population (2021): 716
- Time zone: UTC+3 (TRT)

Akpınar is a village in the Adıyaman District, Adıyaman Province, Turkey. The village is populated by Kurds and had a population of 716 in 2021.

The hamlets of Çakmak, Çınar, Harabe, Küçük Boyalı, Maloğlu and Nacar are attached to Akpınar.
