= Kəmərqaya =

Kəmərqaya Կիրանց • Kirants
- Municipality
- Location within Azerbaijan
- Coordinates: 40°32′38″N 46°04′12″E
- Country: Azerbaijan
- District: Dashkasan

Population
  - Total: 322
- Time zone: UTC+4 (AZT)

Kəmərqaya (Kamargaya; Armenian: Կիրանց, romanized: Kirants) is a village and municipality in the Dashkasan District of Azerbaijan. The village had an Armenian population before the exodus of Armenians from Azerbaijan after the outbreak of the Nagorno-Karabakh conflict.

== Toponymy ==
The village is also known as Kiranzh and was known as Beriyaşen and Şarukkar until 1992.

== Demographics ==
The village has a population of 322.
