= Gökçay, Adıyaman =

Village in Adıyaman Province, Turkey

Gökçay
- Village
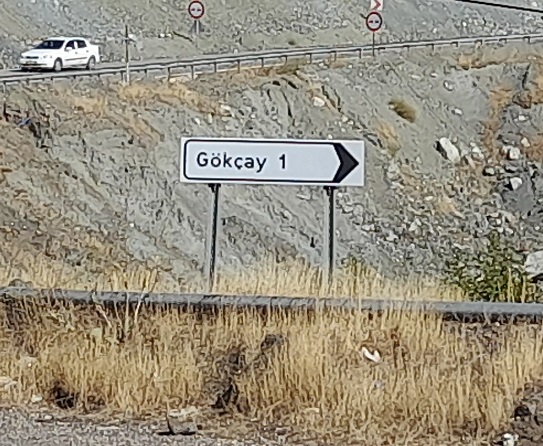
- A view from the village

- Location within Turkey
- Coordinates: 37.939°N 38.288°E
- Country: Turkey
- Province: Adıyaman
- District: Adıyaman
- Population (2021): 248
- Time zone: UTC+3 (TRT)

Gökçay (Kurdish: Qerikan) is a village in the Adıyaman District, Adıyaman Province, Turkey. The village is populated by Kurds of the Kawan tribe and had a population of 248 in 2021.

The hamlets of Budaklı, Çayırlı, Konakdere, Mutluca and Tosunlu are attached to the village.
