= Doyran, Adıyaman =

Village in Adıyaman Province, Turkey

Doyran
- Village
- Location within Turkey
- Coordinates: 37.669°N 38.146°E
- Country: Turkey
- Province: Adıyaman
- District: Adıyaman
- Population (2021): 635
- Time zone: UTC+3 (TRT)

Doyran is a village in the Adıyaman District, Adıyaman Province, Turkey. The village is populated by Kurds of the Sinikan tribe and had a population of 635 in 2021.
