= Meryemuşağı, Tut =

Village in Adıyaman Province, Turkey

Meryemuşağı
- Village
- Location within Turkey
- Coordinates: 37.802°N 37.857°E
- Country: Turkey
- Province: Adıyaman
- District: Tut
- Population (2021): 334
- Time zone: UTC+3 (TRT)

Meryemuşağı is a village in the Tut District, Adıyaman Province, Turkey. The village is populated by Turkmens and had a population of 334 in 2021. One notable aspect of Meryemuşağı is that it is the place of discovery of a species of European spider, Zodarion yagmuri
