= Uğurca, Adıyaman =

Village in Adıyaman Province, Turkey

Uğurca
- Village
- Location within Turkey
- Coordinates: 37.556°N 38.167°E
- Country: Turkey
- Province: Adıyaman
- District: Adıyaman
- Population (2021): 184
- Time zone: UTC+3 (TRT)

Uğurca (Kurdish: Enaw) is a village in the Adıyaman District, Adıyaman Province, Turkey. It is populated by Kurds of the Molikan tribe and had a population of 184 in 2021.
