= Atakent, Adıyaman =

Village in Adıyaman Province, Turkey

Atakent
- Village
- Location within Turkey
- Coordinates: 37.601°N 38.201°E
- Country: Turkey
- Province: Adıyaman
- District: Adıyaman
- Population (2021): 729
- Time zone: UTC+3 (TRT)

Atakent is a village in the Adıyaman District, Adıyaman Province, Turkey. Its population is 729 (2021). Before the 2013 reorganisation, it was a town (belde).
