= Pınaryayla, Adıyaman =

Village in Adıyaman Province, Turkey

Pınaryayla
- Village
- Location within Turkey
- Coordinates: 37.894°N 38.461°E
- Country: Turkey
- Province: Adıyaman
- District: Adıyaman
- Population (2021): 703
- Time zone: UTC+3 (TRT)

Pınaryayla (Kurdish: Artan) is a village in the Adıyaman District, Adıyaman Province, Turkey. The village is populated by Kurds of the Kawan tribe and had a population of 703 in 2021.
