= Davuthan, Adıyaman =

Village in Adıyaman Province, Turkey

Davuthan
- Village
- Location within Turkey
- Coordinates: 37.738°N 38.080°E
- Country: Turkey
- Province: Adıyaman
- District: Adıyaman
- Population (2021): 294
- Time zone: UTC+3 (TRT)

Davuthan (Kurdish: Tatxan) is a village in the Adıyaman District, Adıyaman Province, Turkey. It is populated by Kurds of the Balan tribe and had a population of 294 in 2021.

The hamlet of Dörtyol is attached to the village.
