= Taşgedik, Adıyaman =

Village in Adıyaman Province, Turkey

Taşgedik
- Village
- Location within Turkey
- Coordinates: 37.854°N 38.311°E
- Country: Turkey
- Province: Adıyaman
- District: Adıyaman
- Population (2021): 75
- Time zone: UTC+3 (TRT)

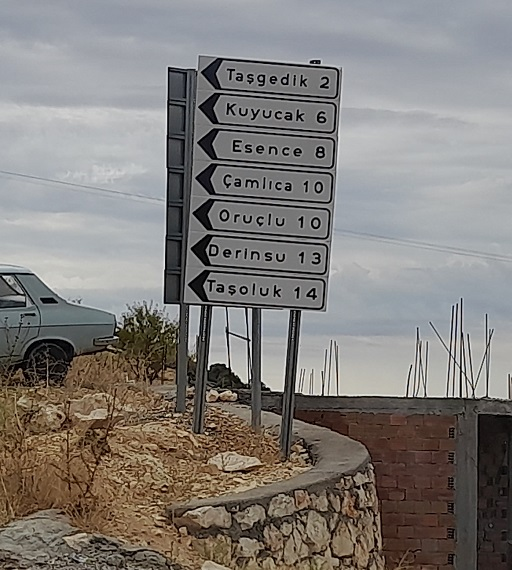
A road sign showing Taşgedik and other villages

Taşgedik (Kurdish: Heyderan) is a village in the Adıyaman District, Adıyaman Province, Turkey. The village is populated by Kurds of the Kawan tribe and had a population of 75 in 2021.
