= Kozan, Adıyaman =

Village in Adıyaman Province, Turkey

Kozan
- Village
- Location within Turkey
- Coordinates: 37.914°N 38.381°E
- Country: Turkey
- Province: Adıyaman
- District: Adıyaman
- Population (2021): 135
- Time zone: UTC+3 (TRT)

Kozan (Kurdish: Qozan) is a village in the Adıyaman District, Adıyaman Province, Turkey. The village is populated by Kurds of the Kawan tribe and had a population of 135 in 2021.
