= Palanlı, Adıyaman =

Village in Adıyaman Province, Turkey

Palanlı
- Village
- Location within Turkey
- Coordinates: 37.834°N 38.308°E
- Country: Turkey
- Province: Adıyaman
- District: Adıyaman
- Population (2021): 191
- Time zone: UTC+3 (TRT)

Palanlı (Kurdish: Palanli) is a village in the Adıyaman District, Adıyaman Province, Turkey. The village is populated by Kurds of the Kawan tribe and had a population of 191 in 2021.
