= Büyükkavaklı, Adıyaman =

Village in Mardin Province, Turkey

Büyükkavaklı
- Village
- Location within Turkey
- Coordinates: 37°42′08″N 38°15′32″E
- Country: Turkey
- Province: Adıyaman
- District: Adıyaman
- Population (2021): 916
- Time zone: UTC+3 (TRT)

Büyükkavaklı is a village in the Adıyaman District, Adıyaman Province, Turkey. Its population is 916 (2021).

The hamlets of Karşıyaka and Küçükkavaklı are attached to the village.
