= Sincik =

- Municipality
- Location in Turkey
- Coordinates: 38.029°N 38.622°E
- Country: Turkey
- Province: Adıyaman
- District: Sincik

Government
  - Mayor: Mehmet Korkut (BBP)
- Population (2021): 4,344
- Time zone: UTC+3 (TRT)
- Postal code: 02400
- Website: www.sincik.bel.tr

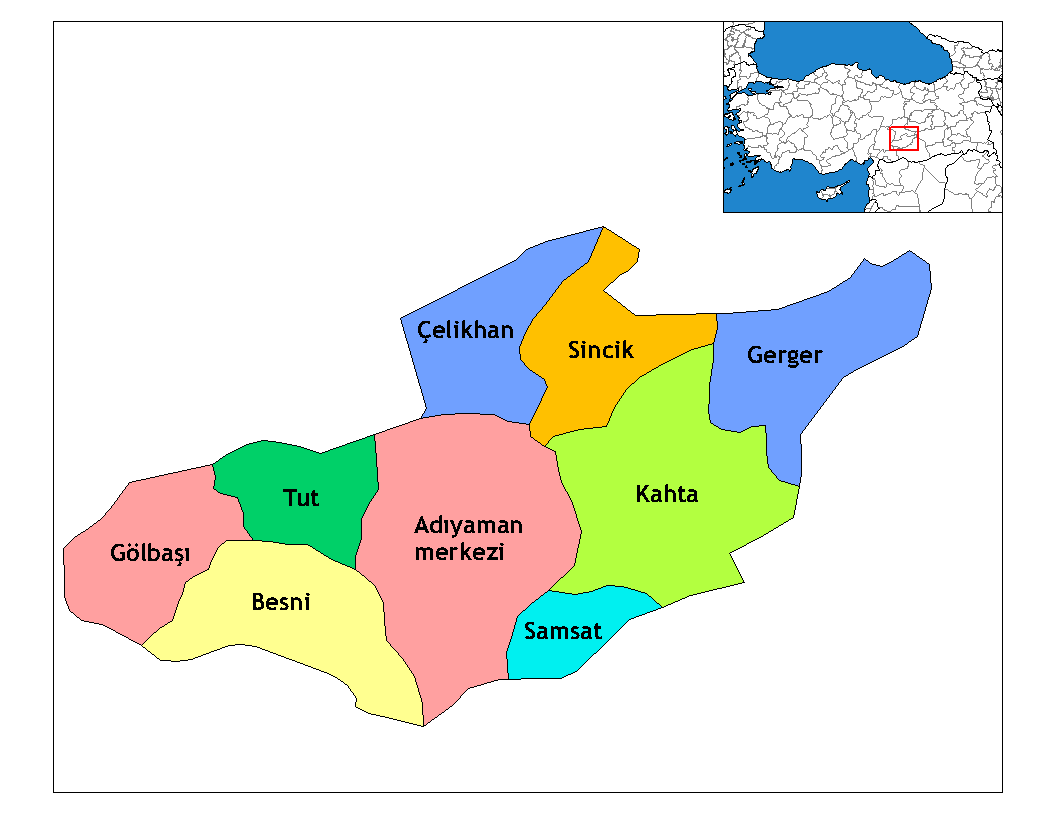
Adıyaman Province

Sincik (Kurdish: Sinciq) is a town of Adıyaman Province of Turkey. It is the seat of Sincik District. The town is populated by Kurds of the Reşwan tribe and had a population of 4,344 in 2021. The mayor is Mehmet Korkut (BBP).

The town is divided into the neighborhoods of Ayengin, Cumhuriyet, Fatih, Karaman, Mahmutoğlu (Serindere), Onur and Zeynel Aslan.
