= Yayladamı, Adıyaman =

Village in Adıyaman Province, Turkey

Yayladamı
- Village
- Location within Turkey
- Coordinates: 37.644°N 38.110°E
- Country: Turkey
- Province: Adıyaman
- District: Adıyaman
- Population (2021): 80
- Time zone: UTC+3 (TRT)

Yayladamı (Kurdish: Gom) is a village in the Adıyaman District, Adıyaman Province, Turkey. The village is populated by Kurds of the Reşwan tribe and had a population of 80 in 2021.
