= Ünlüce, Tut =

Village in Adıyaman Province, Turkey

Ünlüce
- Village
- Location within Turkey
- Coordinates: 37.7817°N 37.9771°E
- Country: Turkey
- Province: Adıyaman
- District: Tut
- Population (2021): 122
- Time zone: UTC+3 (TRT)

Ünlüce is a village in the Tut District, Adıyaman Province, Turkey. Its population is 122 (2021).
