= Oluklu, Adıyaman =

Village in Adıyaman Province, Turkey

Oluklu
- Village
- Location within Turkey
- Coordinates: 37.834°N 38.218°E
- Country: Turkey
- Province: Adıyaman
- District: Adıyaman
- Population (2021): 151
- Time zone: UTC+3 (TRT)

Oluklu (Kurdish: Heciwêrd) is a village in the Adıyaman District, Adıyaman Province, Turkey. It is populated by Kurds of the Kawan tribe and had a population of 151 in 2021.
