= Narince, Kahta =

Village in Adıyaman Province, Turkey

Narince
- Village
- Location within Turkey
- Coordinates: 37.8825°N 38.7592°E
- Country: Turkey
- Province: Adıyaman
- District: Kâhta
- Population (2021): 1,383
- Time zone: UTC+3 (TRT)

Narince (Kurdish: Mirdês) is a village in the Kâhta District, Adıyaman Province, Turkey. The village is populated by Kurds of the Mirdêsan tribe and had a population of 1,383 in 2021.

The hamlets of Halice, Karagöl and Terziyan are attached to Narince.

== Notable people ==
- Osman Sabri
