= Köseli, Tut =

Village in Adıyaman Province, Turkey

Köseli
- Village
- Location within Turkey
- Coordinates: 37.765°N 38.042°E
- Country: Turkey
- Province: Adıyaman
- District: Tut
- Population (2021): 452
- Time zone: UTC+3 (TRT)

Köseli is a village in the Tut District, Adıyaman Province, Turkey. The village is populated by Turkmens and had a population of 452 in 2021.
