= Yenigüven, Adıyaman =

Village in Adıyaman Province, Turkey

Yenigüven
- Village
- Location within Turkey
- Coordinates: 37.806°N 38.332°E
- Country: Turkey
- Province: Adıyaman
- District: Adıyaman
- Population (2021): 400
- Time zone: UTC+3 (TRT)

Yenigüven (Kurdish: Misûrkan) is a village in the Adıyaman District, Adıyaman Province, Turkey. The village is populated by Kurds of the Kawan tribe and had a population of 400 in 2021.
