= Elçiler, Tut =

Village in Adıyaman Province, Turkey

Elçiler
- Village
- Location within Turkey
- Coordinates: 37.781°N 38.067°E
- Country: Turkey
- Province: Adıyaman
- District: Tut
- Population (2021): 48
- Time zone: UTC+3 (TRT)

Elçiler is a village in the Tut District, Adıyaman Province, Turkey. Its population is 48 (2021).
