= Yeniköy, Adıyaman =

Village in Adıyaman Province, Turkey

Yeniköy
- Village
- Location within Turkey
- Coordinates: 37.706°N 38.069°E
- Country: Turkey
- Province: Adıyaman
- District: Adıyaman
- Population (2021): 65
- Time zone: UTC+3 (TRT)

Yeniköy is a village in the Adıyaman District, Adıyaman Province, Turkey. Its population is 65 (2021).
