= Doğanlı, Nusaybin =

Village in Mardin Province, Turkey

Doğanlı
- Neighbourhood
- Location in Turkey
- Coordinates: 37.305°N 41.104°E
- Country: Turkey
- Province: Mardin
- District: Nusaybin
- Population (2021): 308
- Time zone: UTC+3 (TRT)

Doğanlı (Kurdish: Talat) is a neighbourhood in the municipality and district of Nusaybin, Mardin Province in Turkey. The village is populated by Kurds of the Omerkan tribe and had a population of 308 in 2021.
