= Gümüşkaya, Adıyaman =

Village in Adıyaman Province, Turkey

Gümüşkaya
- Village
- Location within Turkey
- Coordinates: 37.423°N 38.172°E
- Country: Turkey
- Province: Adıyaman
- District: Adıyaman
- Population (2021): 1,800
- Time zone: UTC+3 (TRT)

Gümüşkaya (Kurdish: Pelaş) is a village in the Adıyaman District, Adıyaman Province, Turkey. Its population is 1,800 (2021).

The hamlet of Aşağıgöze is attached to the village.
