= Toptepe, Adıyaman =

Village in Adıyaman Province, Turkey

Toptepe
- Village
- Location within Turkey
- Coordinates: 37.825°N 38.362°E
- Country: Turkey
- Province: Adıyaman
- District: Adıyaman
- Population (2021): 290
- Time zone: UTC+3 (TRT)

Toptepe (Kurdish: Semêlî) is a village in the Adıyaman District, Adıyaman Province, Turkey. The village is populated by Kurds of the Kawan tribe and had a population of 290 in 2021.
