= Kavak, Adıyaman =

Village in Adıyaman Province, Turkey

Kavak
- Village
- Location within Turkey
- Coordinates: 37.979°N 38.191°E
- Country: Turkey
- Province: Adıyaman
- District: Adıyaman
- Population (2021): 90
- Time zone: UTC+3 (TRT)

Kavak is a village in the Adıyaman District, Adıyaman Province, Turkey. Its population is 90 (2021).
