= Zey, Adıyaman =

Village in Adıyaman Province, Turkey

Zey
- Village
- Location within Turkey
- Coordinates: 37.807°N 38.250°E
- Country: Turkey
- Province: Adıyaman
- District: Adıyaman
- Population (2021): 647
- Time zone: UTC+3 (TRT)

Zey (formerly İndere) is a village in the Adıyaman District, Adıyaman Province, Turkey. The village is populated by Turks and had a population of 647 in 2021.

The tomb of Şeyh Abdurrahman Erzincani is located in the village.

The hamlet of Maltepe is attached to Zey.

The village suffered heavy destruction during the 2023 Kahramanmaraş earthquakes.
