= Ağaçkonak, Adıyaman =

Village in Adıyaman Province, Turkey

Ağaçkonak
- Village
- Location within Turkey
- Coordinates: 37.921°N 38.327°E
- Country: Turkey
- Province: Adıyaman
- District: Adıyaman
- Population (2021): 106
- Time zone: UTC+3 (TRT)

Ağaçkonak (Kurdish: Kurêmilê) is a village in the Adıyaman District, Adıyaman Province, Turkey. The village is populated by Kurds of the Kawan tribe and had a population of 106 in 2021.

The hamlets of Aşağısakallı and Yukarısakallı are attached to the village.
