= Kayaönü, Adıyaman =

Village in Adıyaman Province, Turkey

Kayaönü
- Village
- Location within Turkey
- Coordinates: 37.805°N 38.191°E
- Country: Turkey
- Province: Adıyaman
- District: Adıyaman
- Population (2021): 1,115
- Time zone: UTC+3 (TRT)

Kayaönü (Kurdish: Ferxikan) is a village in the Adıyaman District, Adıyaman Province, Turkey. The village is populated by Kurds of the Reşwan tribe and had a population of 1,115 in 2021.

The hamlet of Afetevleri is attached to the village.
