= Güzelyurt, Adıyaman =

Village in Adıyaman Province, Turkey

Güzelyurt
- Village
- Location within Turkey
- Coordinates: 37.696°N 38.242°E
- Country: Turkey
- Province: Adıyaman
- District: Adıyaman
- Population (2021): 306
- Time zone: UTC+3 (TRT)

Güzelyurt (Kurdish: Kilîsk) is a village in the Adıyaman District, Adıyaman Province, Turkey. Its population is 306 (2021).
