= Elmacık, Adıyaman =

Elmacık
- Village
- Location within Turkey
- Coordinates: 37.628°N 38.168°E
- Country: Turkey
- Province: Adıyaman
- District: Adıyaman
- Population (2021): 465
- Time zone: UTC+3 (TRT)

Elmacık (Kurdish: Xuraf) is a village in the Adıyaman District, Adıyaman Province, Turkey. Its population is 465 (2021).
