= Şerefli, Adıyaman =

Şerefli
- Village
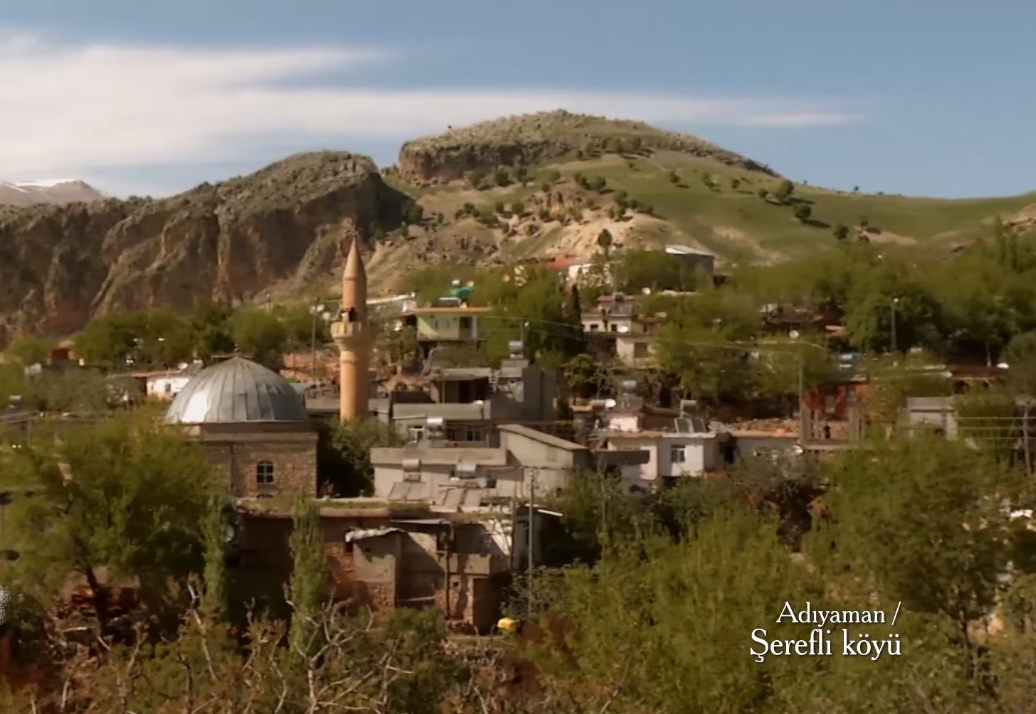

- Location within Turkey
- Coordinates: 37°48′14″N 38°5′1″E
- Country: Turkey
- Province: Adıyaman
- District: Adıyaman
- Population (2021): 457
- Time zone: UTC+3 (TRT)

Şerefli (Kurdish: Şerefan) is a village in the Adıyaman District, Adıyaman Province, Turkey. It is populated by Kurds of the Balan tribe and had a population of 457 in 2021.
