= Rezip, Adıyaman =

Village in Adıyaman Province, Turkey

Rezip Kayatepe
- Village
- Location within Turkey
- Coordinates: 37.873°N 38.281°E
- Country: Turkey
- Province: Adıyaman
- District: Adıyaman
- Elevation: 1,020 m (3,350 ft)
- Population (2021): 664
- Time zone: UTC+3 (TRT)

Rezip (formerly Kayatepe, Kurdish: Rezîw) is a village in the Adıyaman District, Adıyaman Province, Turkey. The village is populated by Kurds of the Kawan tribe and had a population of 664 in 2021.

The hamlet of Örenli is attached to the village.
