= Akyazı, Adıyaman =

Village in Mardin Province, Turkey

Akyazı
- Village
- Location within Turkey
- Coordinates: 37.507°N 38.294°E
- Country: Turkey
- Province: Adıyaman
- District: Adıyaman
- Population (2021): 154
- Time zone: UTC+3 (TRT)

Akyazı (Kurdish: Xolxolîk) is a village in the Adıyaman District, Adıyaman Province, Turkey. The village is populated by Kurds of the Şikakî tribe and had a population of 154 in 2021.
