= Durak, Adıyaman =

Village in Adıyaman Province, Turkey

Durak
- Village
- Location within Turkey
- Coordinates: 37.518°N 38.193°E
- Country: Turkey
- Province: Adıyaman
- District: Adıyaman
- Population (2021): 673
- Time zone: UTC+3 (TRT)

Durak (Kurdish: Gemrik) is a village in the Adıyaman District, Adıyaman Province, Turkey. Its population is 673 (2021).
