= Düzce, Adıyaman =

Village in Adıyaman Province, Turkey

Düzce
- Village
- Location within Turkey
- Coordinates: 37.816°N 38.414°E
- Country: Turkey
- Province: Adıyaman
- District: Adıyaman
- Population (2021): 349
- Time zone: UTC+3 (TRT)

Düzce (Kurdish: Keluz) is a village in the Adıyaman District, Adıyaman Province, Turkey. The village had a population of 349 in 2021.
