= Çamlıca, Adıyaman =

Village in Adıyaman Province, Turkey

Çamlıca
- Village
- Location within Turkey
- Coordinates: 37.889°N 38.333°E
- Country: Turkey
- Province: Adıyaman
- District: Adıyaman
- Population (2021): 210
- Time zone: UTC+3 (TRT)

Çamlıca (Kurdish: Dol) is a village in the Adıyaman District, Adıyaman Province, Turkey. The village is populated by Kurds of the Kawan tribe and had a population of 210 in 2021.

The hamlets of Alıheri, Bahçe, Çiftlice and Gedik are attached to the village.
