= Ahmethoca, Adıyaman =

Village in Adıyaman Province, Turkey

Ahmethoca
- Village
- Location within Turkey
- Coordinates: 37.826°N 38.203°E
- Country: Turkey
- Province: Adıyaman
- District: Adıyaman
- Population (2021): 214
- Time zone: UTC+3 (TRT)

Ahmethoca (Kurdish: Malabawê) is a village in the Adıyaman District, Adıyaman Province, Turkey. The village is populated by Kurds and had a population of 214 in 2021.
