= Sarıharman, Adıyaman =

Village in Adıyaman Province, Turkey

Sarıharman
- Village
- Location within Turkey
- Coordinates: 37.715°N 38.463°E
- Country: Turkey
- Province: Adıyaman
- District: Adıyaman
- Population (2021): 759
- Time zone: UTC+3 (TRT)

Sarıharman (Kurdish: Selamût) is a village in the Adıyaman District, Adıyaman Province, Turkey. Its population is 759 (2021).
