= Çiftlikköy, Tut =

Village in Adıyaman Province, Turkey

Çiftlik
- Village
- Location in Turkey
- Coordinates: 37.777°N 37.874°E
- Country: Turkey
- Province: Adıyaman
- District: Tut
- Population (2021): 231
- Time zone: UTC+3 (TRT)

Çiftlikköy is a village in the Tut District of Adıyaman Province in Turkey. The village is populated by Turkmens and had a population of 231 in 2021.
