= İncebağ, Adıyaman =

Village in Adıyaman Province, Turkey

İncebağ
- Village
- Location within Turkey
- Coordinates: 37.686°N 38.430°E
- Country: Turkey
- Province: Adıyaman
- District: Adıyaman
- Population (2021): 403
- Time zone: UTC+3 (TRT)

İncebağ (Kurdish: Şawşîyê) is a village in the Adıyaman District, Adıyaman Province, Turkey. It is populated by Kurds of the Kawan tribe and had a population of 403 in 2021.

The hamlet of Darıca and Serince are attached to the village.
