= Kuyulu, Adıyaman =

Village in Mardin Province, Turkey

Kuyulu
- Village
- Location within Turkey
- Coordinates: 37.504°N 38.226°E
- Country: Turkey
- Province: Adıyaman
- District: Adıyaman
- Population (2021): 1,526
- Time zone: UTC+3 (TRT)

Kuyulu (Kurdish: Tiruş) is a village in the Adıyaman District, Adıyaman Province, Turkey. The village is populated by Kurds of the Molikan tribe and had a population of 1,526 in 2021.

The hamlet of Reşathan is attached to Kuyulu.
