= Yeşilyurt, Tut =

Village in Adıyaman Province, Turkey

Yeşilyurt
- Village
- Location within Turkey
- Coordinates: 37.749°N 38.025°E
- Country: Turkey
- Province: Adıyaman
- District: Tut
- Population (2021): 202
- Time zone: UTC+3 (TRT)

Yeşilyurt is a village in the Tut District, Adıyaman Province, Turkey. Its population is 202 (2021).

The hamlet of Pınarlı is attached to the village.
