= Esence, Adıyaman =

Village in Adıyaman Province, Turkey

Esence
- Village
- Location within Turkey
- Coordinates: 37.874°N 38.315°E
- Country: Turkey
- Province: Adıyaman
- District: Adıyaman
- Population (2021): 63
- Time zone: UTC+3 (TRT)

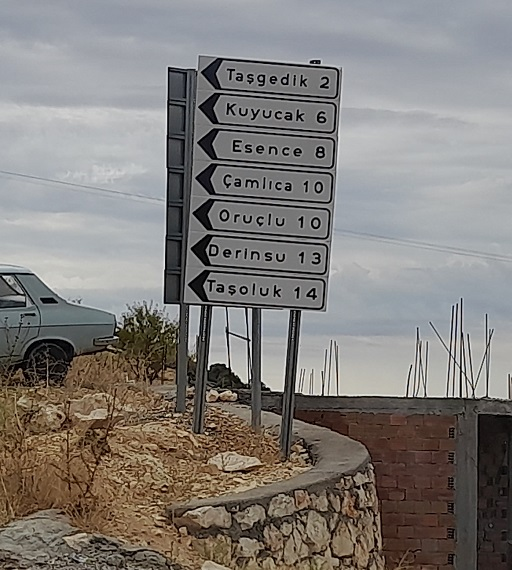
Esence listed on a road directory

Esence (Kurdish: Taîbiyê) is a village in the Adıyaman District, Adıyaman Province, Turkey. The village is populated by Kurds of the Kawan tribe and had a population of 63 in 2021.
