= Derinsu, Adıyaman =

Village in Adıyaman Province, Turkey

Derinsu
- Village
- Location within Turkey
- Coordinates: 37.877°N 38.391°E
- Country: Turkey
- Province: Adıyaman
- District: Adıyaman
- Population (2021): 210
- Time zone: UTC+3 (TRT)

Derinsu (Kurdish: Şêxan) is a village in the Adıyaman District, Adıyaman Province, Turkey. The village is populated by Kurds of the Kawan tribe and had a population of 210 in 2021.

The hamlet of Oruçlu is attached to the village. The village is 25 km away from the city of Adıyaman.
