= Kömür, Adıyaman =

Village in Adıyaman Province, Turkey

Kömür
- Municipality
- Location in Turkey
- Coordinates: 37.865°N 38.426°E
- Country: Turkey
- Province: Adıyaman
- District: Adıyaman
- Population (2021): 3,062
- Time zone: UTC+3 (TRT)

Kömür (Kurdish: Komir) is a town (belde) and municipality in the Adıyaman District, Adıyaman Province, Turkey. The town is populated by Kurds of the Kawan tribe and had a population of 3,062 in 2021.
