= Olgunlar, Adıyaman =

Village in Adıyaman Province, Turkey

Olgunlar
- Village
- Location within Turkey
- Coordinates: 37.835°N 38.356°E
- Country: Turkey
- Province: Adıyaman
- District: Adıyaman
- Population (2021): 209
- Time zone: UTC+3 (TRT)

Olgunlar (Kurdish: Harûnan) is a village in the Adıyaman District, Adıyaman Province, Turkey. The village is populated by Kurds of the Kawan tribe and had a population of 209 in 2021.

== Notable people ==
- Şeyhmus Dağtekin
