= Yenice, Adıyaman =

Village in Adıyaman Province, Turkey

Yenice
- Village
- Location within Turkey
- Coordinates: 37.804°N 38.369°E
- Country: Turkey
- Province: Adıyaman
- District: Adıyaman
- Population (2021): 136
- Time zone: UTC+3 (TRT)

Yenice (Kurdish: Êgundî) is a village in the Adıyaman District, Adıyaman Province, Turkey. The village is populated by Kurds of the Kawan tribe and had a population of 136 in 2021.
