= Hasankendi, Adıyaman =

Village in Adıyaman Province, Turkey

Hasankendi
- Village
- Location within Turkey
- Coordinates: 37.708°N 38.223°E
- Country: Turkey
- Province: Adıyaman
- District: Adıyaman
- Population (2021): 525
- Time zone: UTC+3 (TRT)

Hasankendi (Kurdish: Hesenkendir) is a village in the Adıyaman District, Adıyaman Province, Turkey. Its population is 525 (2021).

The hamlet of Çaylı is attached to the village.
