= Bozhüyük, Adıyaman =

Village in Adıyaman Province, Turkey

Bozhüyük
- Village
- Location within Turkey
- Coordinates: 37.626°N 38.295°E
- Country: Turkey
- Province: Adıyaman
- District: Adıyaman
- Population (2021): 326
- Time zone: UTC+3 (TRT)

Bozhüyük (Kurdish: Bozîg) is a village in the Adıyaman District, Adıyaman Province, Turkey. Its population is 326 (2021).

The hamlets of Bardakçı and Çekiçler are attached to the village.
