= Aydınlar, Adıyaman =

Village in Adıyaman Province, Turkey

Aydınlar
- Village
- Location within Turkey
- Coordinates: 37.643°N 38.392°E
- Country: Turkey
- Province: Adıyaman
- District: Adıyaman
- Population (2021): 26
- Time zone: UTC+3 (TRT)

Aydınlar is a village in the Adıyaman District, Adıyaman Province, Turkey. Its population is 26 (2021).

The hamlets of Göktepe and Miroğlu are attached to the village.
