= Yazlık, Adıyaman =

Village in Adıyaman Province, Turkey

Yazlık
- Village
- Location within Turkey
- Coordinates: 37.637°N 38.323°E
- Country: Turkey
- Province: Adıyaman
- District: Adıyaman
- Population (2021): 141
- Time zone: UTC+3 (TRT)

Yazlık (Kurdish: Kerdiz) is a village in the Adıyaman District, Adıyaman Province, Turkey. The village is populated by Kurds of the Kerdizan tribe and had a population of 141 in 2021.

The hamlets of Kamışlı, Kışla and Koruluk are attached to the village.
