= Albet =

Village in Adıyaman Province, Turkey

- Village
- Location within Turkey
- Coordinates: 37.833°N 38.259°E
- Country: Turkey
- Province: Adıyaman
- District: Adıyaman
- Population (2021): 98
- Time zone: UTC+3 (TRT)

Albet (formerly Yeşiltepe, Kurdish: Albêd) is a village in the Adıyaman District, Adıyaman Province, Turkey. The village is populated by Kurds of the Kawan tribe and had a population of 98 in 2021.
