= Çatalağaç, Gölbaşı =

Town in Adıyaman Province, Turkey

Çatalağaç
- Village
- Location within Turkey
- Coordinates: 37.645°N 37.494°E
- Country: Turkey
- Province: Adıyaman
- District: Gölbaşı
- Population (2021): 317
- Time zone: UTC+3 (TRT)

Çatalağaç (Kurdish: Dirax) is a village in the Gölbaşı District, Adıyaman Province, Turkey. The village is populated by Kurds and Turks and had a population of 317 in 2021. The Kurdish population adhere to Sunni Islam, while both Alevism and Sunni Islam is present among the local Turkish population

The hamlet of Keralmaz, Köşüklü and Lordon is attached to the village.
