= Çatalağaç, Adıyaman =

Village in Adıyaman Province, Turkey

Çatalağaç
- Village
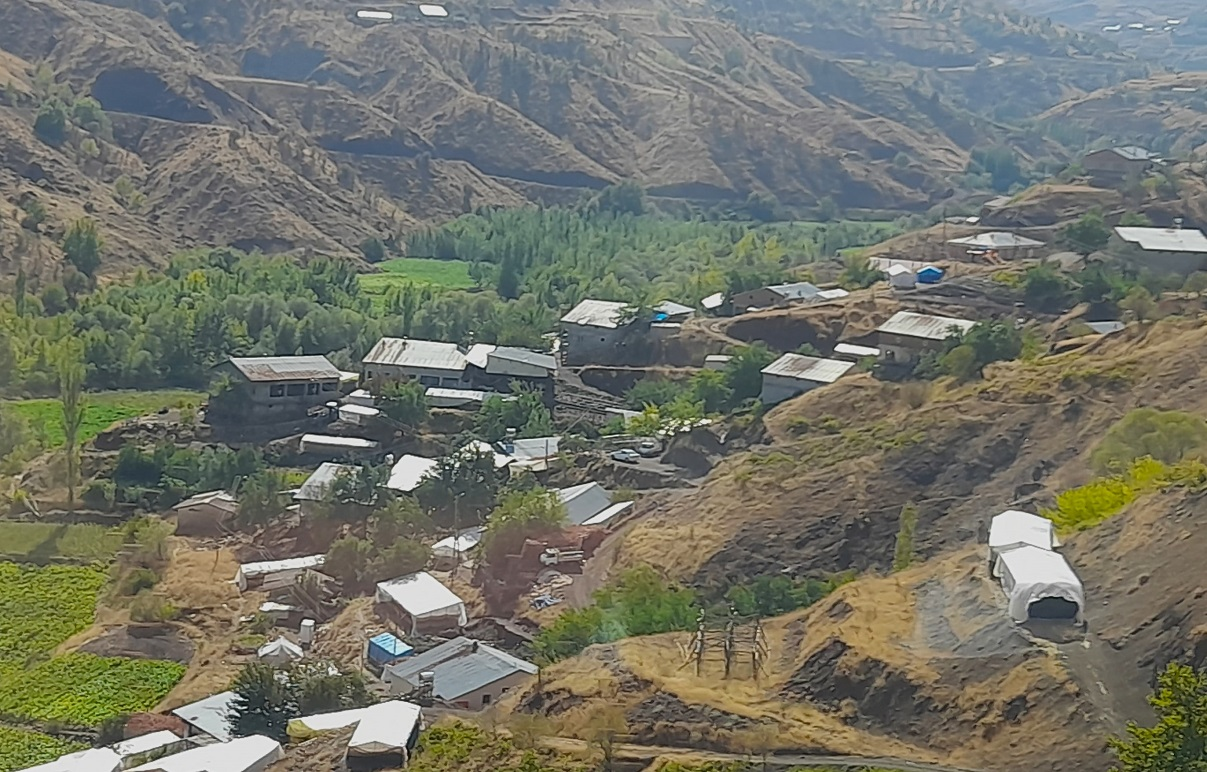
- A view from the village

- Location within Turkey
- Coordinates: 37.959°N 38.305°E
- Country: Turkey
- Province: Adıyaman
- District: Adıyaman
- Population (2021): 251
- Time zone: UTC+3 (TRT)

Çatalağaç (Kurdish: Şexbor) is a village in the Adıyaman District, Adıyaman Province, Turkey. The village is populated by Kurds of the Kawan tribe and had a population of 251 in 201.
