= Ormaniçi, Adıyaman =

Village in Adıyaman Province, Turkey

Ormaniçi
- Village
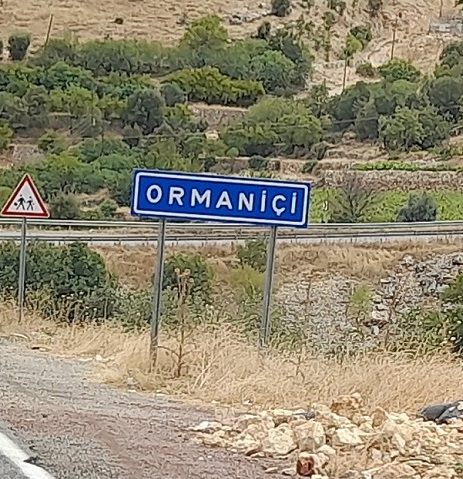
- A view from the village

- Location within Turkey
- Coordinates: 37.856°N 38.304°E
- Country: Turkey
- Province: Adıyaman
- District: Adıyaman
- Population (2021): 189
- Time zone: UTC+3 (TRT)

Ormaniçi (Kurdish: Alxan) is a village in the Adıyaman District, Adıyaman Province, Turkey. The village is populated by Kurds of the Kawan tribe and had a population of 189 in 2021.
