= Bağdere, Adıyaman =

Village in Adıyaman Province, Turkey

Bağdere
- Village
- Location within Turkey
- Coordinates: 37.748°N 38.201°E
- Country: Turkey
- Province: Adıyaman
- District: Adıyaman
- Population (2021): 573
- Time zone: UTC+3 (TRT)

Bağdere (Kurdish: Mezgîrtli) is a village in the Adıyaman District, Adıyaman Province, Turkey. It is populated by Kurds of the Balan tribe and had a population of 573 in 2021.

The hamlets of Gültepe, Güzelevler, Hatunçiftliği, İkidam and Uzunömer are attached to the village.
