= Çemberlitaş, Adıyaman =

Village in Adıyaman Province, Turkey

Çemberlitaş
- Village
- Location within Turkey
- Coordinates: 37.812°N 38.345°E
- Country: Turkey
- Province: Adıyaman
- District: Adıyaman
- Population (2021): 910
- Time zone: UTC+3 (TRT)

Çemberlitaş (Kurdish: Hêştiran) is a village in the Adıyaman District, Adıyaman Province, Turkey. The village is populated by Kurds of the Kawan tribe and had a population of 910 in 2021.
