= Bağpınar, Adıyaman =

Bağpınar
- Village
- Location within Turkey
- Coordinates: 37°35′29″N 38°19′06″E
- Country: Turkey
- Province: Adıyaman
- District: Adıyaman
- Population (2021): 73
- Time zone: UTC+3 (TRT)

Bağpınar (Kurdish: Çelxanî) is a village in the Adıyaman District, Adıyaman Province, Turkey. The village is populated by Kurds of the Terikan tribe and had a population of 73 in 2021.
