= Çençeng, Adıyaman =

Çençeng
- Village
- Location within Turkey
- Coordinates: 37.608°N 38.288°E
- Country: Turkey
- Province: Adıyaman
- District: Adıyaman
- Population (2021): 206
- Time zone: UTC+3 (TRT)

Çençeng (formerly Yazıca) is a village in the Adıyaman District, Adıyaman Province, Turkey. Its population is 206 (2021).
