= Kemerkaya, Adıyaman =

Village in Adıyaman Province, Turkey

Kemerkaya
- Village
- Location within Turkey
- Coordinates: 37.831°N 38.381°E
- Country: Turkey
- Province: Adıyaman
- District: Adıyaman
- Population (2021): 280
- Time zone: UTC+3 (TRT)

Kemerkaya (Kurdish: Axgewr) is a village in the Adıyaman District, Adıyaman Province, Turkey. The village is populated by Kurds of the Kawan tribe and had a population of 280 in 2021.
