= Reşwan =

Kurdish tribe

Reşwan, (Kurdish: ڕەشوان, Reşwan; Turkish: Rişvan) also known as Reşiyan, is a Kurdish tribe, native to the western frontier of Kurdistan, mostly populating Adıyaman, Gaziantep, Kahramanmaraş and Malatya provinces in Turkey and also present in Konya and Ankara provinces, Raqqa in Syria, and Gilan, Khorasan and Qazvin provinces in Iran. Members of the tribe mostly adhere to the Hanafi school of Islam but some are Alevi.

== Etymology ==
Nuh Ateş, a scholar and editor of Bîrnebûn, suggests that the name Reşwan is a compound of the Kurdish words reş (transl. black) and the plural form -ân. Stefan Winter argues Reşwan can be understood as "The Blacks" in Kurdish. Nonetheless, the name of the tribe was written in over fifty different ways in Ottoman documents due to erroneous translations from Kurdish. The tribe also goes by the name Reşî.

== History ==
A tribe by the name of "Reşan" is mentioned in a Yezidi mişûr (manuscript) from 1207 AD, as one of the tribes affiliated to Pir Sini Darani, a Yezidi saint who is represented as the Lord of sea in the Yezidi religion. and today Yezidis from the Reşwan tribe live in Shengal and Duhok, while some of them live in Turkey and neighboring countries.

The name of the tribe was recorded in the defter for Kahta, Besni and Adıyaman in 1519, after Sultan Selim I conquered the area. The tribe was recorded again in 1524 and 1536. During this period, there were inconsistencies about which families were part of the tribe and its population. Nonetheless, they were mainly transhumant nomadic and engaged in agriculture as well.

Reşwan Kurds are mentioned in the geography book Cihannuma, by the Ottoman intellectual Ebū Bekr b. Behrām ed-Dimaşḳī. He describes Reşwan Kurds as Yazidis who live in Ufacıḳlı, Baḳrāṣlı and Behisnī. Additionally, it is mentioned that most of the people of Malatya are Kurds and that one of their clans in these parts are "mischievous rebels" and "highway robbers".

Somewhen in the 17th century, the earliest mention is from 1683, the tribes taxes were included into the Ottoman foundation financing the construction and maintenance of the Atik Valide Mosque. Scholars suggested that the Reşwan were connected to the Rashvand tribe of northwestern Iran.

According to Johann Ludwig Burckhardt, Reşwans were often in contact and at war with nearby Turkoman tribes, who didn't hold the Reşwans in esteem.

During the 1890s, the leader of the tribe Yakup Ragıp protected Armenians from Ottoman massacres.

=== Sedentarization in Central Anatolia (1830–1880) ===
In early 19th century, Reşwan members who lived a nomadic life around Ankara and Konya were subjected to sedentarization attempts by the Ottomans, as part of the Tanzimat. The first attempt took place in 1830, wherein the authorities notified the Reşwan headmen of the Central Anatolian plains regarding their plans to settle them around Sivas. This led to discontent among the leaders who suggested Konya and Ankara as areas of settlement, which the Ottomans agreed on. In other places, the tribe resisted and it is well-documented that they would bribe and even give up everything to continue their semi-nomadic life. During the sedentarization, authorities would both construct new villages for the tribe but also divide and distribute them to already-existing villages to mitigate any rebellion. An 1859 document shows that about 500 households of the tribe lived in Haymana, being sedentarized in 43 villages. By 1880, this section of the tribe had been sedentarized. These tribe members were originally from Adıyaman, Islahiye and Gaziantep Province.

== Politics and elections ==
In the 2000s, the tribe mainly voted for the conservative Justice and Development Party (AKP) until 2014, when the well-known Reşvan Kurdish politician Dengir Mir Mehmet Fırat resigned from AKP and decided to run for the pro-Kurdish Peoples' Democratic Party (HDP) in the local election in 2015. The leaders of the tribe decided to vote for HDP in the general election in June 2015.

== See also ==
- Kurdish tribes
- Kurds of Central Anatolia
- Çelikhan
- Sincik
- Tavşançalı Ömeranlı
- Cihanbeyli
- Kulu
- Yeniceoba

== Bibliography ==
- Dede, Suat (2011), From nomadism to sedentary life in Central Anatolia: The case of the Risvan tribe (1830 - 1932) (PDF), archived from the original (PDF) on 2015-04-02
