= Kılıç =

Kılıç is a Turkish word meaning "sword" and may refer to:

== Places ==
- Kılıç, Anamur, a village in Anamur district of Mersin Province, Turkey
- Kılıç, Gerger, a village in Gerger district of Adıyaman Province, Turkey

== Other uses ==
- Kılıç (surname)
- Kılıç class fast attack craft, a missile boat class of the Turkish Navy
- Kiliç UUV, Turkish autonomous kamikaze unmanned underwater vehicle
- Kılıç Ali Pasha Complex, a religious building complex in Beyoğlu, Istanbul built in the 16th century
- TCG Kılıç Ali Paşa, two destroyers of the Turkish Navy

== See also ==
- Kilij, Turkish saber
