= Battle of Harput (1465) =

Battle between Aq Qoyunlu and Dulkadirs

- Part of Campaigns of Uzun Hasan
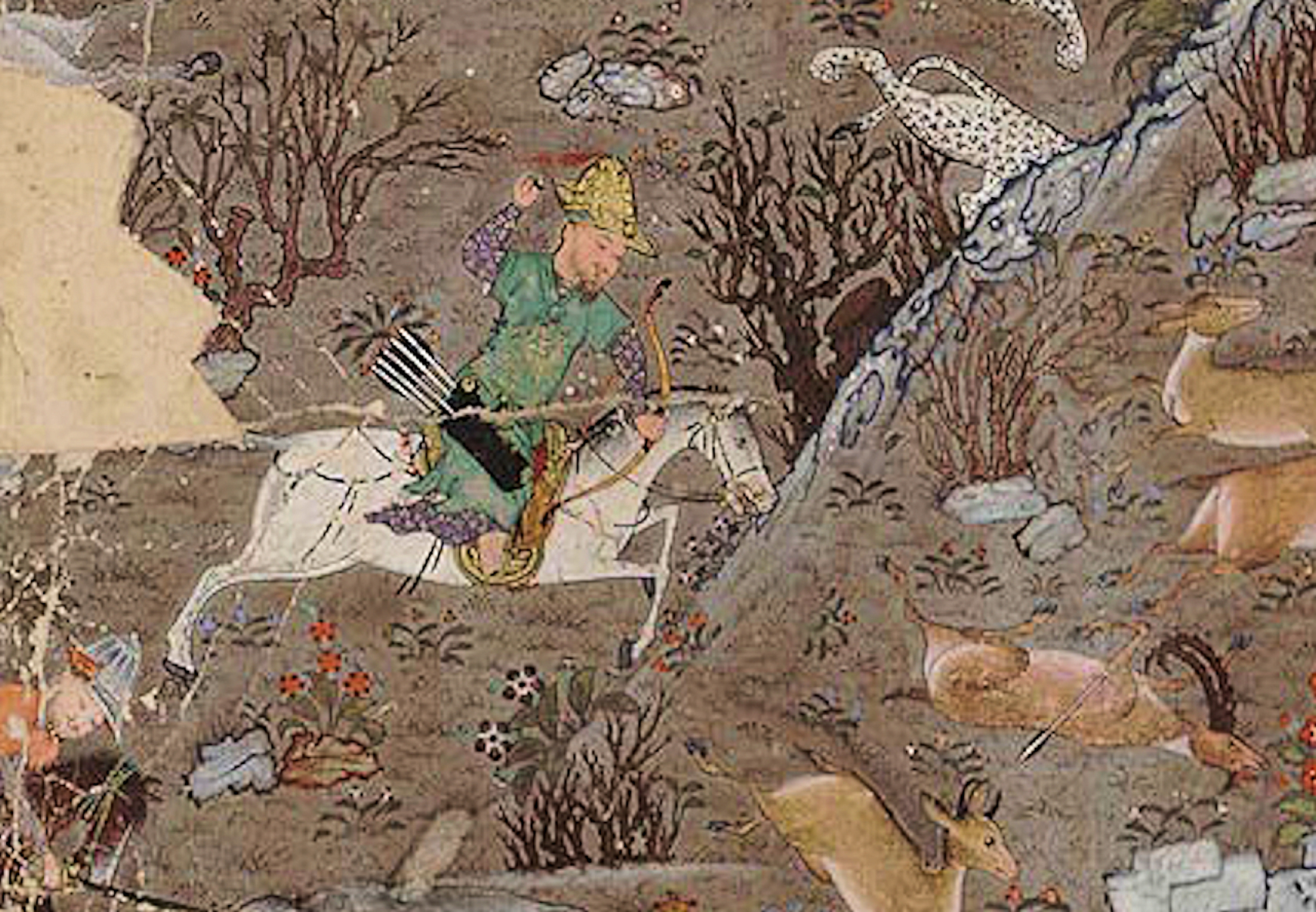
- Uzun Hasan hunting (Tabriz, c. 1467–1474)
Date	1465
Location	Harpoot
Result	Aq Qoyunlu victory
Territorial changes	Dulkadirids ceded Harpoot to Aq Qoyunlu

Belligerents
Aq Qoyunlu	Dulkadirids

Commanders and leaders
Uzun Hasan	Malik Arslan

Strength
Unknown	approx. 30,000

The Battle of Harput was a battle fought between Aq Qoyunlu ruler Uzun Hasan and Dulkadirid ruler Malik Arslan. The battle ended with victory for Uzun Hasan, and cede Harput to Aq Qoyunlu control.

== Background ==
As early reign of Qara Yuluk Uthman Beg, he attempted to capture Harpoot. In 1428, Aq Qoyunlu forces launched an expedition towards of Malatya and successfully took Harpoot. In 1429 after seizing the city from Dulkadirids, Uthman Beg declared own son Ali Bey as a governor of Harpoot. Angered by the Aq Qoyunlu seizure of Harpoot, Nasir al-Din Mehmed Bey launched an expedition in 1433 by order of Barsbay. Expedition ended with failure to capture Diyarbakır after an unsuccessful siege. Despite this failure, Nasir al-Din Mehmed Bey continued his claim over Harpoot and successfully captured city in 1439, later Mamluks recognised his authority there.

In 1464, Malik Arslan Beg attacked Kayseri, which was under the control of Karamanids. In response Karamanids appealed to Aq Qoyunlu for help. These events significantly heightened relations between Dulkadirids and Aq Qoyunlu.

Uzun Hasan has been seeking a cause for retake Harpoot from Dulkadirid rule. In 1465 he approached the Mamluk Sultanate with a proposal to exchange Gerger for Harpoot from Dulkadirids domain, But Mamluk sultan rejected the proposal.

== Battle ==
Conflict began in 1465, when Uzun Hasan attacked Harpoot, under rule of Malik Arslan Beg. After Uzun Hasan besieged city, Malik Arslan marched out with 30,000 soldiers and crossed Euphrates River. In first stages of battle, he captured two Aq Qoyunlu commanders; Suleiman Beg, son of Bijan and Ibrahim, brother of Halil Beg Tavacı. Course of conflict soon turned against Dulkadirids however. Uzun Hasan pursued Melik Arslan toward Malatya later to Elbistan. Upon learning that Uzun Hasan reached Elbistan, Melik Arslan fled to Asander region. As result Uzun Hasan occupied and plundered Elbistan. Realizing that Malik Arslan could no longer defeat Aq Qoyunlu forces, He dispatched envoys and proposed peace with calling himself a loyal to Hasan. Viziers of Uzun Hasan, Mawlana Yahya and Chichakoglu also forwarded terms of peace with Malik Arslan, Uzun Hasan demanded Harput Castle and these two commanders.

Malik Arslan whose retreated upper Ceyhan River, agreed to release prisoners and cede Harpoot to Aq Qoyunlu for 4,000 Ashrafi gold coins.

== Aftermath ==
Harput remained under Aq Qoyunlu rule until 1507. The Mamluk Sultan Khushqadam grew furious at Malik Arslan for his apparent ties with the Ottomans. Malik Arslan's brother Shah Budak, who was residing in Cairo, encouraged the sultan to commission Malik Arslan's assassination with the hopes that he could rise to the throne. Khushqadam dispatched a fedayeen from Cairo to the north. Malik Arslan was murdered in October 1465 at a mosque in Elbistan, during the Friday prayer.

== See also ==
- Mamluk Sultanate
- Karamanids

== Sources ==
- Wood, John E. (1999). The Aqquyunlu: Clan, Confederation, Empire. University of Utah Press.
- Sumer, Faruk (1989). Aq Qoyunlus. Ankara: Türkiye Diyanet Foundation Press.
- Yinanç, M. Halil (1978). Aq Qoyunlu Confederation (in Turkish). Vol. 1 (İslâm Ansiklopedisi ed.). Istanbul: Türkiye Diyanet Foundation Press.
- Gökhan, Ilyas (2008). Dulkadir Beyliği Araştırmaları (PDF) (in Turkish). Vol. 1. Kahramanmaraş: UKDE Press.
- Alıç, Samet (2020). Aq Qoyunlu–Dulkadirid relations (in Turkish). KSÜSBD publishings.
- Inalcık, Halil (1955). Mehmed II (PDF). İslâm Ansiklopedisi (in Turkish). Vol. 7. Istanbul: MEB Publishings.
- Yinanç, Refet (1989). Dulkadir Beyliği (in Turkish). Ankara: Turkish Historical Society Press. ISBN 9751601711. OCLC 21676736.
- Venzke, Margaret L. (2017). "Dulkadir". In Fleet, Kate; Krämer, Gudrun; Matringe, Denis; Nawas, John; Rowson, Everett (eds.). Encyclopaedia of Islam (3rd ed.). Brill Online. doi:10.1163/1573-3912_ei3_COM_27743. ISSN 1873-9830.
- Har-El, Shai (1995). Struggle for Domination in the Middle East: The Ottoman-Mamluk War, 1485-91. E.J. Brill. ISBN 9004101802. OCLC 624096003.
