= Malik Arslan =

Beg of Dulkadir from 1454 to 1465

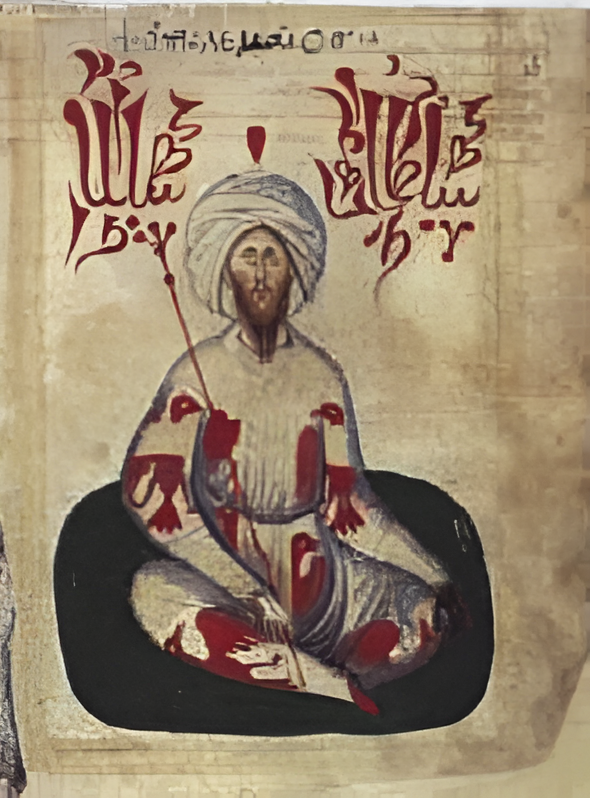
- Byzantine-style portrait of Malik Arslan kept in Biblioteca Marciana, Venice.

Beg of Dulkadir
- Reign: 28 August 1454 – October 1465
- Predecessor: Suleiman
- Successor: Shah Budak
- Died: October 1465; Elbistan, Beylik of Dulkadir
- Issue: Kilij Arslan; Alp Arslan
- House: Dulkadir
- Father: Suleiman
- Religion: Islam

Sayf al-Din Malik Arslan (died October 1465) was Beg (ruler) of Dulkadir from 28 August 1454 until his death. Malik Arslan was one of the numerous sons of his predecessor Suleiman Beg (r. 1442–1454). After competing with his uncle Feyyaz, he rose to the throne, favored by the Mamluk Sultan Sayf al-Din Inal (r. 1453–1461). Later into his reign, Malik Arslan was involved in the succession wars within the Karamanids. He ransacked the region wishing to retake Kayseri but was defeated by the Aq Qoyunlu ruler Uzun Hasan (r. 1453–1478). In September 1465, Malik Arslan ceded Harpoot to Uzun Hasan, who had taken advantage of the worsening relations between Malik Arslan and the Mamluks. Malik Arslan was assassinated on the orders of Sayf al-Din Khushqadam (r. 1461–1467), incited by Malik Arslan's rival brother Shah Budak (r. 1465–1466, 1472–1480), who replaced him.

== Background and early life ==
The Beylik of Dulkadir was founded by Zayn al-Din Qaraja (r. 1337–1353), a Turkmen chieftain, as a client state of the Mamluk Sultanate, in southern Anatolia and northern Syria. Qaraja eventually rebelled against the Mamluks and was executed in 1353. The conflict between the Dulkadirids and the Mamluks persisted with the consecutive rule of his sons Ghars al-Din Khalil (r. 1353–1386) and Shaban Suli (r. 1386–1398), who were both assassinated on the orders of the Mamluk Sultan Barquq (r. 1382–1389, 1390–1399). With the reigns of Malik Arslan's grandfather, Mehmed (r. 1399–1442), and father, Suleiman (r. 1442–1454), the Dulkadirids attempted to forge amicable relations both with the Ottoman state and the Mamluk Sultanate through arranged marriages. Malik Arslan, together with his father, escorted his sister Sittişah Hatun from the capital Elbistan to Edirne for her wedding with the Ottoman prince and future sultan Mehmed II.

== Reign ==
Following his father's death on 28 August 1454, Malik Arslan took power and sent his father's sword to the Mamluk Sultan Sayf al-Din Inal (r. 1453–1461) as a declaration of his allegiance to the Mamluk Sultanate. Inal favored Malik Arslan over his paternal uncle Feyyaz, who was the amir al-tabl of Tripoli and had traveled to Cairo to request the manshūr (diploma) that would legitimize his claim to the throne.

At the time of Malik Arslan's accession to the throne, the influence of the Aq Qoyunlu ruler Uzun Hasan (r. 1453–1478) over the region had peaked. Various Turkmen chieftains loyal to the Dulkadirids were joining Uzun Hasan's ranks and took part in the internal conflicts within the Aq Qoyunlu. On the other hand, Malik Arslan took advantage of the death of Ibrahim II of Karaman in 1464 and subsequent skirmishes among his heirs by attempting to loot the Karamanid realm and capturing Kayseri, which had previously come under Karamanid rule. Uzun Hasan intervened in the conflict upon the request of the locals. He removed the Dulkadirid forces, ransacked their domains, and enthroned Ishak (r. 1464–1465) with endorsement by the Mamluk Sultanate.

In the second quarter of 1365, when the influence of Sayf al-Din Khushqadam (r. 1461–67) over the Karamanids waned, the Ottoman Sultan Mehmed II (r. 1444–1446, 1451–1481) attempted to install Pir Ahmed (r. 1465–1466) in the Karamanid throne. Khushqadam sought Malik Arslan's support in the struggle. Malik Arslan declined Khushqadam's request, not willing to be on bad terms with Mehmed II. However, Ishak would shortly pass away after taking refuge under Uzun Hasan in Amid in April 1465, eventually getting replaced by Pir Ahmed.

Uzun Hasan responded to the Ottoman involvement in the region and apparent Ottoman–Mamluk rivalry by laying siege to Harpoot, following his earlier offer to the Mamluk sultan to exchange the town with Gerger, which the Mamluks refused as Harpoot was Dulkadirid territory. Upon the news of the siege, Malik Arslan passed the Euphrates and reached Harpoot with thirty thousand troops. He attacked the Aq Qoyunlu army and captured several commanders. Despite his momentary success, Malik Arslan retreated when Uzun Hasan went on to face him off. Malik Arslan fled to Malatya and then to Elbistan. He further evacuated Elbistan when Uzun Hasan arrived, pillaging the area and destroying the Dulkadirid capital. Through the negotiations led by Uzun Hasan's vizier, Mawlana Yahya, Malik Arslan agreed to release the prisoners he took and ceded Harpoot to the Aq Qoyunlu in exchange for 4,000 ashrafi gold coins in September 1465. Although the Mamluk Sultan Khushqadam signaled his discontent with Harpoot's loss by declining Malik Arslan's embassy in Cairo, the Mamluks had not intervened in the conflict as they were more unsettled by the accord between Malik Arslan and the Ottomans. Aware of the Mamluks' concerns, Uzun Hasan sent his mother to Cairo to hand over the key to the Castle of Harpoot.

== Assassination and succession ==
The Mamluk Sultan Khushqadam grew furious at Malik Arslan for his apparent ties with the Ottomans. Malik Arslan's brother Shah Budak, who was residing in Cairo, encouraged the sultan to commission Malik Arslan's assassination with the hopes that he could rise to the throne. Khushqadam dispatched a fedayeen from Cairo to the north. Malik Arslan was murdered in October 1465 at a mosque in Elbistan, during the Friday prayer. Ottoman writer Ahmed Arifi Pasha and later historians such as İsmail Hakkı Uzunçarşılı erroneously referred to his deathplace as Cairo, where he was seeking Mamluk help against Uzun Hasan. According to Besim Darkot, Malik Arslan was killed in the Grand Mosque of Marash.

Malik Arslan's demise ignited a clash between two factions led by Malik Arslan's brothers: Shah Budak, who was sponsored by the Mamluks, and Shah Suwar, who solicited Mehmed II to intercede. Shah Budak emerged victorious and rose to the throne. His appointment by the Mamluks was initially not espoused by Dulkadirid dignitaries. Malik Arslan was survived by his son Kilij Arslan, who later entered Uzun Hasan's service and settled in Tabriz. Kilij Arslan conspired to overthrow Shah Budak in 1472 with the support of the Aq Qoyunlu. However, the downfall of the Aq Qoyunlu, which was expedited by the Battle of Otlukbeli in 1473, warded him off. A son of Malik Arslan named Alp Arslan was serving the Ottomans as a sanjak-bey (governor) in 1500.

== Bibliography ==
- Har-El, Shai (1995). Struggle for Domination in the Middle East: The Ottoman-Mamluk War, 1485-91. E.J. Brill. ISBN 9004101802. OCLC 624096003.
- Öztuna, Yılmaz (2005). Devletler ve hanedanlar: Türkiye (1074-1990) (in Turkish). Ministry of Culture. ISBN 9751704693. OCLC 949531568.
- Redford, Scott (2004). "Byzantium and the Islamic World, 1261–1557". In Evans, Helen C. (ed.). Byzantium Faith And Power 1261–1557. New Haven: Yale University Press. pp. 389–397. ISBN 0-300-10278-X. OCLC 54082338.
- Singer, Amy (May 2016). "Enter, Riding on an Elephant: How to Approach Early Ottoman Edirne". Journal of the Ottoman and Turkish Studies Association. 3 (1). Indiana University Press: 89–109. doi:10.2979/jottturstuass.3.1.06. ISSN 2376-0702.
- Venzke, Margaret L. (2017). "Dulkadir". In Fleet, Kate; Krämer, Gudrun; Matringe, Denis; Nawas, John; Rowson, Everett (eds.). Encyclopaedia of Islam (3rd ed.). Brill Online. doi:10.1163/1573-3912_ei3_COM_27743. ISSN 1873-9830.
- Yinanç, Refet (1989). Dulkadir Beyliği (in Turkish). Ankara: Turkish Historical Society Press. ISBN 9751601711. OCLC 21676736.
