= Dağdeviren =

Dağdeviren is a Turkish word, and it may refer to:

== People ==
- Canan Dağdeviren (born 1985), Turkish female materials scientist and academic

== Places ==
- Dağdeviren, Gerger, a village in Gerger district of Adıyaman Province, Turkey
