= Beşgöze =

Beşgöze can refer to:

- Beşgöze, Gerger
- Beşgöze, Tercan
