= Köklüce =

Köklüce is a Turkish place name that may refer to the following places in Turkey:

- Köklüce, Gerger, a village in the district of Gerger, Adıyaman Province
- Köklüce, Palu
- Köklüce, Yüreğir, a village in the district of Yüreğir, Adana Province

Köklüce is also the Turkish name of Venets, Shumen Province.
