= Güngörmüş =

Güngörmüş (literally "has seen days," meaning "worldly" or "experienced") is a Turkish place name that may refer to the following places in Turkey:

- Güngörmüş, Gerger, a village in the district of Gerger, Adıyaman Province
- Güngörmüş, Taşova, a village in the district of Taşova, Amasya Province
