= Köklüce, Gerger =

Village in Adıyaman Province, Turkey

Köklüce
- Village
- Location within Turkey
- Coordinates: 37.926°N 38.988°E
- Country: Turkey
- Province: Adıyaman
- District: Gerger
- Population (2021): 96
- Time zone: UTC+3 (TRT)

Köklüce (Arabic: عوربيش; Kurdish: Ûlbuş; Syriac: ܥܘܪܒܝܫ, romanized: ʿUrbish) (Note: Alternatively transliterated as ‛Orbīš, ‘Urbīsh, or ‘Ūrbīš.) is a village in the Gerger District, Adıyaman Province, Turkey. The village is populated by Kurds of the Dêrsimî tribe and had a population of 96 in 2021. The village also has an Armenian population.

== History ==
ʿUrbish (today called Köklüce) was historically inhabited by Syriac Orthodox Christians. The Monastery of Mar Abhai, also known as the Monastery of the Ladders, near Urbish was founded sometime after the fifth century. One priest and two deacons were consecrated for the Church of Morī Gewargīs at ʿUrbish in Tišrīn (October) 1584 AD (AG 1895).

The monk-priest Mīkā b. Barṣaum of Urbish copied Bar Hebraeus' Mnārat Qudshē (Arabic: Manārat al-Aqdās; Latin: Liber candelabri sanctuarii) in Tammūz 1579/1580 (AG 1890) at the Monastery of Mar Abhai. He became metropolitan of Karkar with the name Gregorius in 1590/1591. In 1598 (AG 1909), Gregorius Michael son of Barṣawmō of ‘Urbish transcribed a copy of the Chronicle of Michael the Syrian. He restored a copy of the Ktābā d-zalgē (Arabic: Kitāb al-ashiʿa; Latin: Liber radiorum) by Bar Hebraeus at the Dayrā d-Mār Zakkai in Tammūz 1603 (AG 1914) for the priest Pawlōs b. Shemʿōn b. Farīd of Wank. He died in 1618. Michael's uncle the monk-priest Pilate Mukhtār 'Urbishi of Karkar (1584) was also a calligrapher.

The village was populated by Syriac Orthodox Christians until the first decades of the 20th century.

== Bibliography ==
- Al-Jeloo, Nicholas (2019). "Who were the Assyrians of Bitlis?". In Mehmet İnbaşı; Mehmet Demirtaş (eds.). Tarihî ve Kültürel Yönleriyle Bitlis. Vol. II. Bitlis Eren Üniversitesi Yayınları. pp. 363–390.
- Andrews, Peter; Benninghaus, Rüdiger (2002). Ethnic Groups in the Republic of Turkey: Supplement and Index. ISBN 9783895002298.
- Barsoum, Aphrem (2003). The Scattered Pearls: A History of Syriac Literature and Sciences. Translated by Matti Moosa (2nd ed.). Gorgias Press.
- Barsoum, Aphrem (2009). History of the Syriac Dioceses. Vol. 1. Translated by Matti Moosa. Gorgias Press.
- Bcheiry, Iskandar (2010). A List of Syriac Orthodox Ecclesiastic Ordinations from the Sixteenth and Seventeenth Century: The Syriac Manuscript of Hunt 444 (Syr 68 in Bodleian Library, Oxford). Gorgias Press.
- Harrak, Amir, ed. (2019). The Chronicle of Michael the Great (the Edessa-Aleppo Syriac codex): books XV-XXI from the year 1050 to 1195. Piscataway, NJ: Gorgias Press. ISBN 978-1-4632-4031-8.
- Oncu, Mehmet (2023). Binemal û hozên li herêma Semsûrê (in Kurdish). Sîtav.
- Takahashi, Hidemi (2013). Barhebraeus: A Bio-Bibliography. Gorgias Press.
