= Oymaklı =

Oymaklı is a Turkish place name that may refer to the following places in Turkey:

- Oymaklı, Gerger, a village in the district of Gerger, Adıyaman Province
- Oymaklı, Karataş, a village in the district of Karataş, Adana Province
