= Shah Suwar =

Beg of Dulkadir from 1466 to 1472

- Malik al-Muzaffar (Note: lit. 'The Triumphant King')
- A rare coin specimen issued by Shah Suwar in Aintab likely between 1468 and 1471.

Beg of Dulkadir
- Reign: April 1466 – 4 June 1472
- Predecessor: Shah Budak
- Successor: Shah Budak

Ottoman Sanjak-bey of Chirmen
- Reign: 1465

Ottoman Wali of Bozok and Artukabad
- Reign: 4 December 1465 – 1466
- Born: Before 1432
- Died: 24 August 1472 (aged over 40); Cairo, Mamluk Sultanate
- Issue: Ali; Kasim; Shah Khatun
- House: Dulkadir
- Father: Suleiman
- Religion: Islam

Shah Suwar (Ottoman Turkish: شهسوار; Turkish: Şehsuvar; before 1432 – 24 August 1472) was the ruler of Dulkadir from April 1466 to 4 June 1472. Upon the assassination of his brother, Malik Arslan (r. 1454–1465), he competed for the throne against his other brother Shah Budak (r. 1465–1466, 1472–1480), who took over with the support of the Mamluk Sultanate. Shah Suwar was welcomed by the Ottoman Sultan Mehmed II (r. 1444–1446, 1451–1481), who appointed him to a number of positions in his realm. Six months into Shah Budak's reign, Shah Suwar defeated him and instead became the new ruler in April 1466. The Mamluks fiercely disputed Shah Suwar's reign. The Sultans Khushqadam (r. 1461–1467) and Qaitbay (r. 1468–1496) launched multiple consecutive campaigns to subdue him. Shah Suwar initially triumphed over the Mamluks and expanded his territory, occupying the entirety of the Ramadanid realm.

Shah Suwar started loosening his ties with the Ottomans, who disapproved of the constant warfare between him and the Mamluks. In 1468, he declared himself a sovereign ruler and circulated coins in his name. Three years later, the Mamluk Sultan negotiated with the Ottomans for them to cut ties and halt their support for Shah Suwar. Qaitbay seeded mistrust among Turkmen lords loyal to Shah Suwar and sought their support for the Mamluks. Shah Suwar gradually lost many of his supporters as well as the lands he had conquered to the Mamluk forces. In April 1472, Shah Suwar retreated to his residence at the Zamantu Castle. After a lengthy siege, he surrendered to the Mamluks on 4 June 1472. He and many of his brothers were brought to Cairo on 24 August 1472, where he was executed. Shah Budak replaced him as the new ruler.

== Background ==
The Beylik of Dulkadir was founded by Zayn al-Din Qaraja (r. 1337–1353), a Turkmen lord, as a client state of the Mamluk Sultanate, in southern Anatolia and northern Syria. Qaraja eventually rebelled against the Mamluks and was executed in 1353. The conflict between the Dulkadirids and the Mamluks persisted with the consecutive rule of his sons Ghars al-Din Khalil (r. 1353–1386) and Shaban Suli (r. 1386–1398), who were both assassinated on the orders of the Mamluk Sultan Barquq (r. 1382–1389, 1390–1399). With the reigns of Shah Suwar's grandfather, Mehmed (r. 1399–1442), and father, Suleiman (r. 1442–1454), the Dulkadirids attempted to forge amicable relations both with the Ottoman state and the Mamluk Sultanate by marrying into the royal family. During the rule of Suleiman's son, Malik Arslan (r. 1454–1465), the Dulkadirids were involved in the succession wars within the Karamanids as well as a struggle against Uzun Hasan (r. 1453–1478). Malik Arslan was assassinated in October 1465 on the orders of Sayf al-Din Khushqadam (r. 1461–67), who was discontent over Malik Arslan's hesitation to support Mamluk interests in the internal struggles of the Karamanids.

== Rise to power ==
The assassination of Shah Suwar's brother, Malik Arslan, ignited a conflict over the throne between Shah Suwar and his other brother, Shah Budak (r. 1465–1466, 1472–1480). Shah Budak claimed the rule through Mamluk support but faced opposition from Dulkadirid dignitaries. Shah Suwar had taken refuge under the Ottoman Sultan Mehmed II (r. 1444–1446, 1451–1481) who appointed him as the sanjak-bey of Chirmen, located in Thrace. On 4 December 1465, four days after Mamluk confirmation of Shah Budak's rule, Shah Suwar was made the wali (governor) of Bozok and Artukabad through a takrirname (memorandum) that noted those lands as formerly belonging to his father, Suleiman (r. 1442–1454). Shah Suwar was officially granted authority over the Dulkadir and Bozok nomads, who had scattered over the region near Bozok (Yozgat) and Tokat disgruntled by Shah Budak's reign or for other reasons. Shah Budak requested Mamluk aid, and the Mamluk Sultan Khushqadam sent Berdi Beg, the governor of Aleppo, to assist him. Shah Suwar defeated Shah Budak near the Zamantu Castle before the Mamluk forces could come to Shah Budak's aid, prompting Berdi Beg to return to Aleppo in April 1466.

== War with Khushqadam ==
Shortly after Shah Suwar's rise to power, the Mamluk Sultan Khushqadam supported Shah Suwar's uncle Rustam Beg and assigned Yashbak al-Bajasi, the governor of Aleppo, to help Rustam gain the throne. Shah Suwar informed Mehmed II of this threat through his congratulatory embassy for Mehmed's annexation of Albania. In response, Mehmed II requested Shah Suwar to deliver the appeal he wrote to the Mamluk sultan. In that appeal dated back to November 1466, Mehmed II emphasized the affinity he felt towards Egypt and that Shah Suwar was the legitimate ruler of his realm. It is unknown whether this letter reached Cairo or had any significant impact on their relations as Khushqadam's endorsement of Rustam Beg continued. (Note: In his initial letter to Mehmed II, Shah Suwar additionally proposed a change in the Dulkadirid-Karamanid border and asked for the pardoning of Iskender Pasha. Mehmed II assigned the kadi (judge) of Amasya to see Shah Suwar's proposal for the border change, and as indicated in his letters, ordered the reversion of the border to its former state during the reigns of Malik Arslan and Ibrahim II (r. 1424–64).)

=== First Mamluk campaign ===
Rustam Beg eventually abandoned the conflict, which emboldened Shah Suwar to expand his territory. Shah Suwar captured Birecik, Besni, Gerger, and Rumkale from the Mamluks. An Armenian colophon from 1467 mentioned that Shah Suwar "committed much destruction in his land; he slew many [Turkmens] who were called Apaneri; and he committed many atrocities." The colophon further relayed that after taking Vahka, Shah Suwar raised the city and citadel of Sis on fire on 2 June and departed south, where he captured the cities of Adana, Tarsus, Ayas as well as other towns.

Khushqadam urgently ordered the Mamluk governors of Syria to topple Shah Suwar and restore Shah Budak's rule. Shah Suwar was preparing for a battle in Çukurova and informed the Ottomans. Mehmed II's grand vizier Mahmud Pasha advised Shah Suwar to diplomatically settle the dispute but also relayed Ottoman support for Shah Suwar. An army under the command of the governor of Damascus, Berdi Beg, and guided by Shah Budak marched north to subdue Shah Suwar. A Mamluk-backed Turkmen lord Eslemezoghlu attacked the Dulkadirid forces in order to weaken them until the Mamluk army's arrival but soon sought safety under Pir Ahmed of Karaman. The Mamluk army entered the Dulkadirid realm in September 1467. Waiting for the right moment to flank, Shah Suwar allowed the Mamluks to reach Turnadağ, near Göksun. There, on 4 October 1467, Shah Suwar led an unexpected attack, capturing Berdi Beg and killing several Mamluk commanders, such as Kanibeg Hasan, the governor of Tripoli, as well as Qaraja al-Zahiri and Almas al-Ashrafi, the atabegs of Aleppo and Damascus, respectively. Although Berdi Beg later escaped, he was imprisoned in Jerusalem by the Mamluks, who claimed him responsible for the defeat.

=== Second Mamluk campaign ===
The Mamluks prepared for another campaign against Shah Suwar. They dispatched a new army from Cairo under Janibeg Kulaksiz in February 1468. All of the Syrian Mamluk governors and their forces joined this army near Aleppo. In May, they reached Aintab, which was under Dulkadirid control. Shah Suwar waited for several days. He ambushed a reconnaissance force of the Mamluks and approached Aintab, successfully provoking the Mamluk army to pursue him. On 30 May 1468, he defeated the Mamluk army near a forested area, capturing Kulaksiz and killing many of the Mamluk emirs, while Uzbek, the governor of Damascus, escaped the massacre through the Ramadanid ruler Hasan Beg's assistance.

Shah Suwar grew braver with this victory. While a portion of his army ransacked the Kurdish-populated areas toward Aleppo, another group started occupying the cities and fortresses controlled by the Ramadanids in the west. Taking advantage of the Ottoman campaign against the rival Karamanids, Shah Suwar took Vahka and trusted his brother Yunus Beg with its control. Shah Suwar besieged Sis and installed his supporter Umar Beg (r. 1470–1485) as the new Ramadanid ruler.

The locations of towns in Anatolia and Syria.

== War with Qaitbay ==
By 1468, many Turkmen lords started shifting their allegiance. While Shah Suwar's former rival Rustam Beg entered the Aq Qoyunlu ruler Uzun Hasan service, nobles under Aq Qoyunlu sided with the Dulkadirids and the Ottomans. Furthermore, the Mamluk governors of Aleppo and Damascus communicated their respect for Mehmed II to Shah Suwar. When he informed Mehmed II of this news and his attacks on Aleppo and Darende, Mehmed II noted his appreciation for Shah Suwar's service to the Ottomans but expressed his discontent with the outright conflict between Shah Suwar and the Mamluks. The Mamluk Sultan Qaitbay (r. 1468–1496) consulted the Caliph Al-Mustanjid (r. 1455–79) and four women to finance a campaign against Shah Suwar at a time of economic distress. Despite his council's disapproval, Qaitbay confiscated the properties of the mosques and monasteries to raise money for the campaign. Meanwhile, Shah Suwar was trying to ransom the Mamluk commanders he had captured.

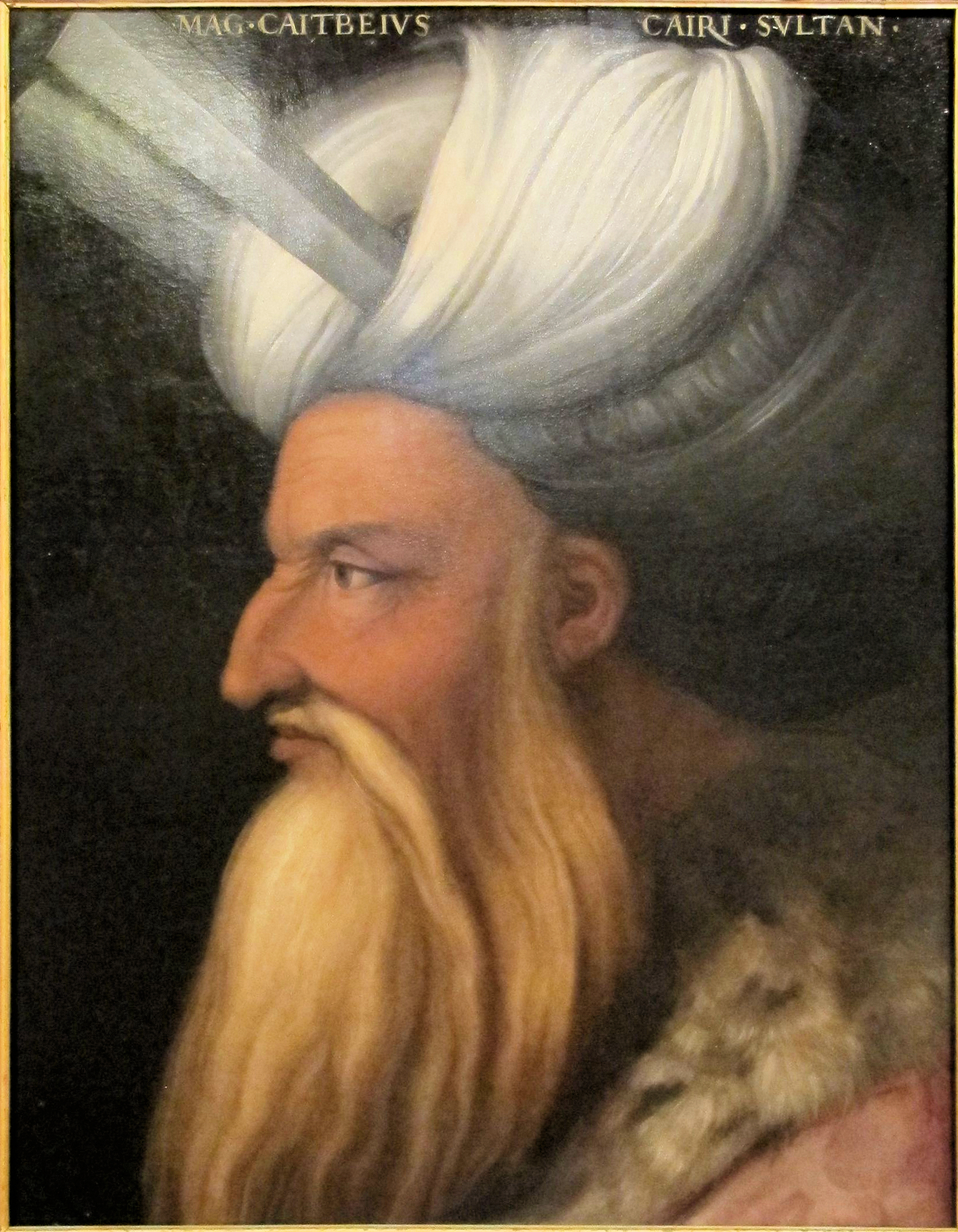
16th-century portrait of Qaitbay by Florentine painter Cristofano dell'Altissimo.

These economic gains boosted Shah Suwar's ambition to become an independent sultan. In a meeting with Turkmen notables, he claimed that he was a sultan equal to his Ottoman counterpart and declared a revolt against Mehmed II. He had the khutbah read in his name, issued his own coins, and took the title Malik al-Muzaffar, inviting the people of Syria to come under his rule. In his letters from September 1468 (that were discovered in Aleppo), he assured that he would protect the traders in the region and their properties. He started raiding the city around this time. Qaitbay sent a preliminary force of 500 troops to Aleppo to make up for the insufficient garrison in the city. In November 1468, after a long-lasting siege, Darende fell to Shah Suwar, who drove its Mamluk governor, Balabanoghlu, away. Shah Suwar then sought peace with the Mamluks, but Qaitbay rejected his embassy in Cairo.

=== Third Mamluk campaign ===
By that time, the arrangements for a new campaign were complete. Another army under Uzbek and Shah Budak departed Cairo and merged with other forces near Aleppo in February 1469. The Dulkadirid forces confronted the Mamluks on the left bank of the Ceyhan River to the southwest of Marash in April 1469. The Dulkadirid forces were crushed, and Shah Suwar's brother Mughulbay was killed in battle. Shah Suwar fled to Kars (modern-day Kadirli) through the mountains, with his forces stationed on the paths to the town. In June 1469, when the Mamluk army was preparing to return to Egypt due to a shortage of subsistence, the Dulkadirids struck back. Apart from a significant amount of casualties, the Mamluk commander Uzbek was able to return to Egypt.

As soon as the Mamluk forces retreated, Shah Suwar's brother Yahya besieged Malatya. The city's Mamluk governor, Korkmaz, hid his forces until the Ramadanid aid arrived. In August 1469, they broke the siege by killing 500 Dulkadirid troops as well as capturing Yahya and several other relatives of Shah Suwar and sending them to Aleppo. The Ramadanids took advantage of this victory by restoring their control over Sis in October 1469. The next month, Shah Suwar released Janibeg Kulaksiz to appease Qaitbay. In January 1470, Shah Suwar's embassy arrived in Cairo with his conditions for peace, which included the recognition of his sovereignty and the placement of Dulkadirid garrison in Aleppo in exchange for Aintab's transfer to Mamluk rule. The negotiations were fruitless, and in March 1470, the Dulkadirid prisoners were transported to Cairo, where they would be presented to Qaitbay as a sign of Mamluk victory and were later kept in the city's castle. Shah Suwar responded to the Mamluk rejection of his terms by retaking Ayas and then Tarsus, Adana, and Sis in June 1470. Having almost wholly seized the Ramadanid realm, Shah Suwar directed his attacks towards Aleppo, which prompted Qaitbay to reinforce the city's garrison.

=== Fourth Mamluk campaign ===
The weakening of the Mamluks in the region aroused Uzun Hasan's ambition to expand towards the Euphrates. Concerns over a joint Dulkadirid and Aq Qoyunlu offensive on Aleppo elicited the preparations for another campaign despite great economic difficulty. The army departed Cairo in February 1471. Its leader Emir Yashbak min Mahdi was further trusted with great authority such as the liberty to appoint and dismiss any official in Syria. The army once again included Shah Budak among its ranks and absorbed various auxiliary Turkmen forces when it reached Aleppo in May 1471. As the Mamluk army was stationed there, the leader of the Pahlevanlu tribe, Sarim Ibrahim, who was loyal to the Dulkadirids, robbed a Mamluk convoy near Malatya and Besni, causing the governor of Malatya, Korkmaz, to pursue him. They engaged in a skirmish near the village of Sakaltutan, which resulted in the capture of Korkmaz, who was brought to Shah Suwar. In May, he punished Korkmaz with death by immuring him in a house.

However, the next month, the leader of the Dulkadirid garrison of Aintab, Kanibay handed over the town to the Mamluk forces after withstanding a nine-day siege. Shah Suwar had failed to come to the city's aid on time by five days. Shah Suwar instead settled on the Sof Mountain, west of the city, using it as his headquarters. He dispatched a portion of his forces to the south and another to the east near Rumkale to block Mamluk aid. Through the confession of a captive, the Mamluks discovered their location and made an unexpected attack on the Dulkadirid troops who had 28 casualties, among whom were their foremost commanders. On 9 August, Shah Suwar sent a representative and many gifts to the Mamluk commander in Aintab to request peace. Even though Yashbak accepted the offer, which started the negotiations between the two sides, Shah Suwar refused to leave Sis and Darende to the Mamluks. After learning of Shah Suwar's flight to the south, Yashbak assigned members of his retinue, Gunduzoghlu Umar Beg to defend Amik Valley and Inaloghlu Hamza Beg to guard Ravanda on the route to Aleppo. Shah Suwar originally intended to recruit the Turkmens in the Amik Valley but had to return to Marash in August upon noticing the Mamluk presence in the area.

=== Fifth Mamluk campaign ===
According to Ottoman historians such as Aşıkpaşazade, Solakzade, and Hoja Sa'd al-Din, Qaitbay sent many gifts to Mehmed II urging him to stop safeguarding Shah Suwar. Qaitbay suggested that he would leave Egypt to the Ottomans if Mehmed II let him take vengeance on Shah Suwar. By that time, Shah Suwar had stopped heeding the warnings from the Ottoman officials. Although he had pledged to assist them in their campaign against the Karamanids, he instead allowed the Karamanid ruler Pir Ahmed to take refuge in his realm. Mehmed II thus discontinued his support for Shah Suwar. Learning of the discord between Shah Suwar and the Ottomans, Qaitbay attempted to reduce the local Turkmen lords' trust in Shah Suwar by dispersing gifts of gold and letters that highlighted Shah Suwar's continued disobedience toward the Ottomans and asked for their cooperation with the Mamluk army.

Yashbak soon arrived north with a large army under his command. He first laid siege to Ayas, where many Turkmens contributed to the town's capture by switching sides, including Shah Suwar's brothers Hudadad and Selman, both of whom were paid for their service. After dispatching commander Aynal Ashkar to Adana, Yashbak then moved to the confluence of the Savrun Stream and Ceyhan River, near Kars. There, on 12 November 1471, Shah Suwar encountered Yashbak and faced a heavy defeat with 320 casualties and 100 captives, fleeing the scene. Shah Suwar lost all of the lands in the Lower Cilician Plain he had previously conquered. As Yashbak continued marching along the river, Shah Suwar's devatdar and emir-i ahur as well as 160 other people vowed to obey Yashbak. After resisting for some time, the Dulkadirid commander in Sis, Devletbay, handed the town over to the Mamluks. Yashbak spent the winter in Aleppo and returned to the battlefield in the spring of 1472. In April, Shah Suwar agreed to relinquish Darende for peace. Qaitbay refused the offer, and Yashbak further penetrated north near Elbistan. Having lost much of his supporters, Shah Suwar secluded himself in the Castle of Zamantu, where his harem and treasury were located.

== Surrender and execution ==
Following a brief siege, Yashbak took the Castle of Hurman and approached the Castle of Zamantu on 22 May. He set his camp at the Melikgazi village. The siege started after two days of rest. By then, Shah Suwar had at most 60 men, and 300 women and children loyal to him in his residence. Mehmed II's son Bayezid offered to supply the Mamluk army's needs. Hopeless, Shah Suwar asked Yashbak to enter his castle for his surrender. When Yashbak instead demanded that he leave his residence, Shah Suwar stipulated the condition that Qaitbay's brother, Timraz, and other Mamluk commanders be taken hostage as a guarantee for his life. After declining Shah Suwar's terms once again, Yashbak escalated the intensity of the siege.

On 4 June 1472, Shah Suwar finally left the castle with 30 men and surrendered. He was forced to wear a robe with a metal collar. Shah Suwar's guards attempted to save their master, which resulted in their killing by the Mamluks. The Mamluk army returned to Elbistan and enthroned Shah Budak as the new Dulkadirid ruler. A major parade was prepared for Shah Suwar's arrival in Cairo, which contemporary historian Ibn Iyas recorded in detail:

The capital was ornamented with flags according to the Sultan's instructions. The city was full of people, as everyone wanted to see Shah Suwar pass. The homes on the route were rented for four ashrafis, the stores for one ashrafi. Despite their timidity, even the young girls wanted to see Shah Suwar; this Shah Suwar was responsible for the deaths and looting that left so many children orphaned. Commander Yashbak's cortege entered Cairo on 18 Rabi' al-Awwal 877 [24 August 1472]. Only Emir Timraz was staying aside; he was ashamed of the way Shah Suwar was captured. Shah Suwar had a black dress on him and a large turban on his head. He had a collar with chains attached to his neck.

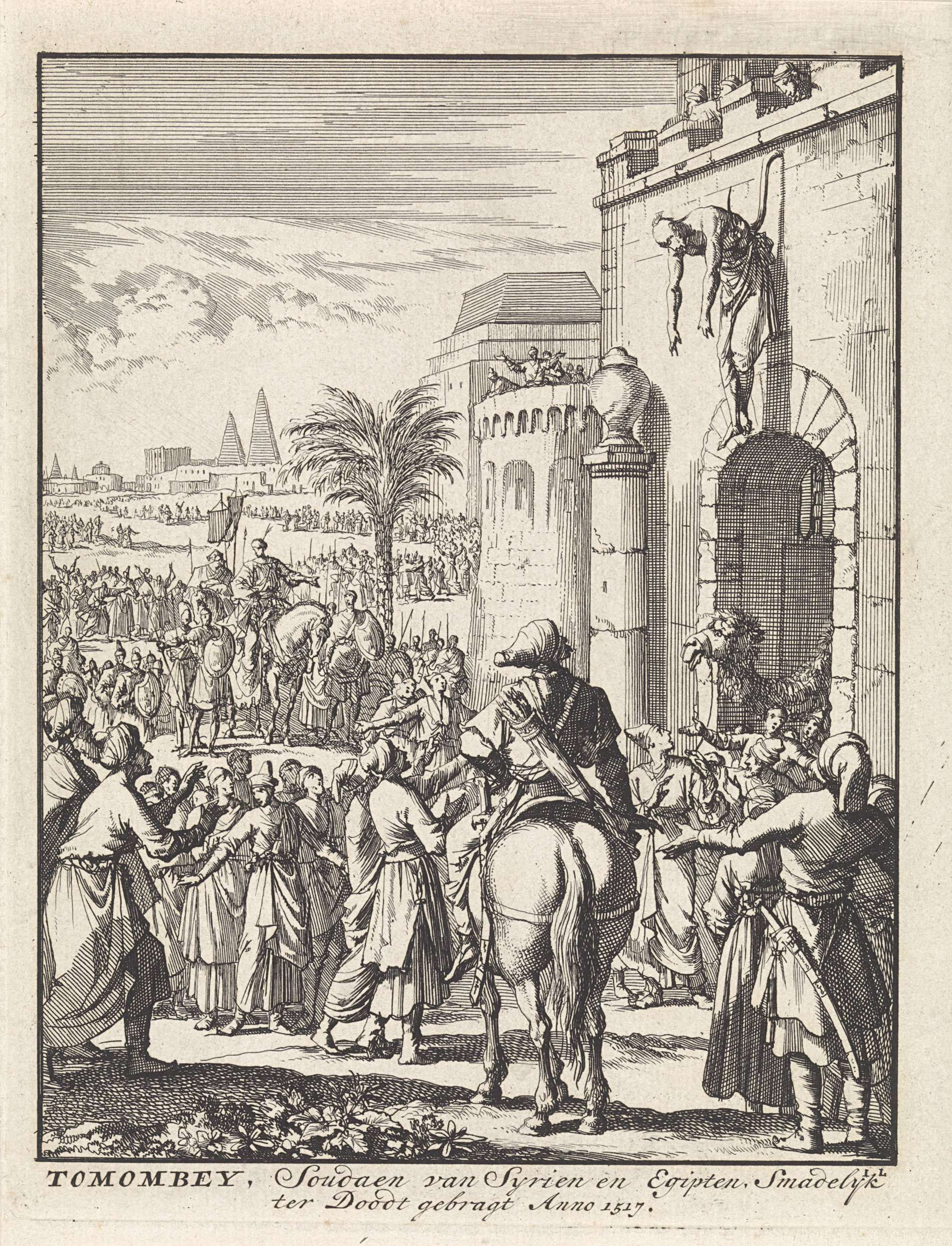
Dutch illustrator Jan Luyken's depiction of the last Mamluk Sultan Tuman bay II's (r. 1516–17) hanging at Bab Zuweila, where Shah Suwar was also hanged.

According to Ibn Iyas, musicians and singers filled the street from Bab al-Nasr to Bab al-Mudarraj (gates of the citadel). He further described that Shah Suwar's brothers and relatives were following him on camels and without clothes until the final destination of Bab Zuweila. In order to hang Shah Suwar and his brothers, Qaitbay had gotten the fatwas (Islamic legal ruling) of four different qadis (judges). Shah Suwar, along with his brothers Erdivane, Hudadad, and Yahya, were hanged at Bab Zuweila. The rest of his brothers, Isa, Yunus, and Selman, were sent to Bab al-Nasr for their execution, but they were freed when there was a backlash by the locals, who opposed the hanging as they found the brothers too young and handsome. Turkmen lords loyal to Shah Suwar were chopped up into pieces. Ibn Iyas described Shah Suwar as very handsome, medium height, robust, round-faced, pinkish white-complexioned, blue-eyed, and black-bearded. At the time of death, Shah Suwar was in his 40s.

== Coinage ==
Shah Suwar is the only ruler of Dulkadir known to have struck coins in his name. His coins are very rare with three published specimens: one in Necdet Kabaklarlı Collection, another in Murat Uğurluer Collection, and a third specimen is circulated on the Internet. These coins weigh 4.21, 2.09, and 4.11 grams, and measure 15.5–20, 14–19, and 11–22 millimeters, respectively. The coins were minted in the city of Aintab likely between 1468 and June 1471, when the city returned to Mamluk control. The following statement in Arabic was engraved on the coins:

Obverse: شهسوار بـن سليمان عـز نصره, Shahsuwar bin Suleiman 'azza nasruhu
transl. Shahsuwar, the son of Suleiman, may his victory be glorified.
Reverse: ضـرب عـيـنـتاب خـلد ملكه, Duriba Ayntab hullida mulkuhu
transl. Struck in Aintab; may his reign be everlasting.

== Family ==
Shah Suwar's offspring included Ali (r. 1515–1522), Kasim, and Shah Khatun. Ali was the last ruler of his dynasty and was killed by Ferhat Pasha. Afterwards, the lands of the Dulkadirids were annexed by the Ottoman Empire. Kasim became the Ottoman sanjak-bey of Sultanönü.

== Bibliography ==
- Har-El, Shai (1995). Struggle for Domination in the Middle East: The Ottoman-Mamluk War, 1485-91. E.J. Brill. ISBN 9004101802. OCLC 624096003.
- Öztuna, Yılmaz (2005). Devletler ve hanedanlar: Türkiye (1074-1990) (in Turkish). Ministry of Culture. ISBN 9751704693. OCLC 949531568.
- Sanjian, Avedis K. (5 February 1969). Colophons of Armenian Manuscripts, 1301-1480, A Source for Middle Eastern History (PDF). Cambridge, Massachusetts: Harvard University Press. ISBN 9780674432611. OCLC 54310.
- Uğurluer, Murat (2006). "Ayntab'da Dulkadiroğlu Şehsuvar Bey Adına Basılan Sikke" [The Coin Minted in Aintab in the Name of the Dulkadirid Shah Suwar Beg]. Arkeoloji ve Sanat Dergisi (in Turkish). 28 (121). ISSN 1300-4514.
- Venzke, Margaret L. (2017). "Dulkadir". In Fleet, Kate; Krämer, Gudrun; Matringe, Denis; Nawas, John; Rowson, Everett (eds.). Encyclopaedia of Islam (3rd ed.). Brill Online. doi:10.1163/1573-3912_ei3_COM_27743. ISSN 1873-9830.
- Yinanç, Refet (1989). Dulkadir Beyliği (in Turkish). Ankara: Turkish Historical Society Press. ISBN 9751601711. OCLC 21676736.
