= Gürgenli =

Gürgenli (literally "(place) with hornbeams") is a Turkish place name that may refer to the following places in Turkey:

- Gürgenli, Gerger, a village in the district of Gerger, Adıyaman Province
- Gürgenli, Sason, a village in the district of Sason, Batman Province
