= Gönen (disambiguation) =

Gönen is a district of Balıkesir Province of Turkey.

Gönen means "damp soil" in Turkish and may also refer to:

== People ==
- Cenk Gönen (born 1988), Turkish footballer

== Places ==
- Gönen, Gerger, a village in the district of Gerger, Adıyaman Province, Turkey
- Gönen, Isparta, a town and district of Isparta Province, Turkey
- Gönen Dam, Turkey
