= Ağaçlı =

Ağaçlı is a Turkic word meaning "(place) with trees" and may refer to:

- Ağaçlı, Ceyhan, a village in the district of Ceyhan, Adana Province, Turkey
- Ağaçlı, Gerger, a village in the district of Gerger, Adıyaman Province, Turkey
- Ağaçlı, Karayazı
- Ağaçlı, Kulp
- Ağaçlı, Söke, a village in the district of Söke, Aydın Province, Turkey
