= Yeşilyurt, Gerger =

Yeşilyurt
- Village
- Location within Turkey
- Coordinates: 38.049°N 39.044°E
- Country: Turkey
- Province: Adıyaman
- District: Gerger
- Population (2021): 120
- Time zone: UTC+3 (TRT)

Yeşilyurt (Arabic: ونك; Kurdish: Venk; Syriac: ܘܐܢܟ, romanized: Wank) (Note: "Monastery" in Armenian. Alternatively spelt as Wānik. Also known as Dayr Abū Ghālib or Dayr Abū Ġālib (Arabic: دير ابو غالب; Syriac: ܕܝܪܐ ܕܐܒܘ ܓܐܠܒ, lit. 'Monastery of Abu Ghalib') or the Monastery of the Mother of God and Mōr Zakai. Originally known as the King's Table Monastery (Arabic: دير مائدة الملك; Syriac: ܕܰܝܪܐ ܦܳܬܘܪ ܡܰܠܟ̈ܐ). It is known as Deva Gavura in Zaza and Gondi Gavura in Kurdish, both of which translate to "the village where the infidels live".) is a village in the Gerger District, Adıyaman Province, Turkey. The village is populated by Kurds of the Ferşatan and Mukrîyanî tribes and had a population of 120 in 2021.

== History ==
The King's Table Monastery (today called Yeşilyurt) was founded in 1138. It became known as Dayr Abū Ghālib after Athanasius Abu Ghalib, bishop of Jaiḥan (r. 1169–1177), who had been a monk at the monastery and had died there, according to the Chronicle of Michael the Syrian. The monastery's church was rebuilt by Patriarch Michael the Syrian in 1170. Joseph of Abu Ghalib’s Monastery wrote a hagiographical collection for the Mor Bar Sauma Monastery, dated October 1196, sponsored by his cousin the deacon Ṣaliba, at the request of Patriarch Michael the Syrian. Dawud of Amid resided at the Monastery of Abu Ghalib and the Monastery of Mar Abhai after his retirement as bishop of Shlabdin before 1198 prior to settling at the Monastery of Mar Iliyya. In total, the monastery produced five bishops.

The village is attested by the name Venk-i Ermeniyan in the Ottoman archives in 1519. Five deacons and one priest were consecrated for the Church of the Mother of God at Wank on 11 Tamūz (July) 1580 (AG 1891). The monk Micah Najjar Dawlatshah of Wank (1589–1606) was an eminent calligrapher. Gregory John Najjar, metropolitan of Cappadocia and Edessa (r. c. 1599 – c. 1624), was born at Wank. Dayr Abū Ghālib continued to be occupied until 1600. Metropolitan Iyawannis Jirjis, son of Amir Shah of Wank, was abbot of the Monastery of the Syrians in Egypt in 1633. Ephraim of Wank, metropolitan of Hattakh (1612–1675), copied Ḥasan bar Bahlul's dictionary in 1659. Four deacons were consecrated for the Church of the Mother of God at Wank in 1674 (AG 1985). The bishop Severus Yuhanna transcribed a copy of the Gospels in Syriac for the church at Wank in 1750. The village formed part of the Syriac Orthodox diocese of Gargar.

In April 1913, Matran Abd Dunnur, archbishop of Mamuret-ül Aziz, petitioned the government for the reconstruction of the dilapidated church at Wank and requested that it be renamed the Mar Eliyan/Mar Elbeyan Church. At this time, the village was inhabited by 140 Syriacs and there were thirty-nine households. The petition was approved on 2 May 1914. In 1915, amidst the Sayfo, Syriacs and Armenians from Wank were thrown into the Euphrates whilst others were killed in the nearby caves and the church was pillaged and destroyed. Some Christians took refuge in neighbouring villages or converted to Islam.

In 2016, there were forty-six households, including six Syriac families.

== Bibliography ==
- Aybek, Ömer Faruk (1988). Otuzuncu yılında Gerger (Aldüş) (in Turkish).
- Barsoum, Aphrem (2003). The Scattered Pearls: A History of Syriac Literature and Sciences. Translated by Matti Moosa (2nd ed.). Gorgias Press.
- Barsoum, Aphrem (2009a). History of the Syriac Dioceses. Vol. 1. Translated by Matti Moosa. Gorgias Press.
- Barsoum, Aphrem (2009b). The Collected Historical Essays of Aphram I Barsoum. Vol. 1. Translated by Matti Moosa. Gorgias Press.
- Bcheiry, Iskandar (2010). A List of Syriac Orthodox Ecclesiastic Ordinations from the Sixteenth and Seventeenth Century: The Syriac Manuscript of Hunt 444 (Syr 68 in Bodleian Library, Oxford). Gorgias Press.
- Dalyan, Murat Gökhan (2024). "A General Evaluation of the 1893 and 2023 Earthquakes in Adıyaman and its Environs". Folklor/Edebiyat. 30 (120): 1429–1454.
- Harrak, Amir, ed. (2019). The Chronicle of Michael the Great (the Edessa-Aleppo Syriac codex): books XV-XXI from the year 1050 to 1195. Piscataway, NJ: Gorgias Press. ISBN 978-1-4632-4031-8.
- Hoyland, Robert G.; Palmer, Andrew N. (2023). The Life of Theodotus of Amida: Syriac Christianity under the Umayyad Caliphate. Gorgias Press.
- Kaufhold, Hubert (2000). "Notizen zur Späten Geschichte des Barsaumo-Klosters". Hugoye: Journal of Syriac Studies. 3 (2): 223–246. Archived from the original on 31 August 2025.
- Kawerau, Peter (2022). The Syriac Orthodox Church in the Time of the Syriac Renaissance: In Concept and Reality. Translated by Patrick Conlin. Gorgias Press.
- Oncu, Mehmet (2023). Binemal û hozên li herêma Semsûrê (in Kurdish). Sîtav.
