= Sutepe, Gerger =

Village in Adıyaman Province, Turkey

Sutepe
- Village
- Location within Turkey
- Coordinates: 37.945°N 38.802°E
- Country: Turkey
- Province: Adıyaman
- District: Gerger
- Population (2021): 297
- Time zone: UTC+3 (TRT)

Sutepe (Kurdish: Xizorî) is a village in the Gerger District, Adıyaman Province, Turkey. The village is populated by Kurds of the Mirdêsan tribe and had a population of 297 in 2021.

The hamlet of Çavuş is attached to Sutepe.
