= Yağmurlu, Gerger =

Village in Adıyaman Province, Turkey

Yağmurlu
- Village
- Location within Turkey
- Coordinates: 37.971°N 39.030°E
- Country: Turkey
- Province: Adıyaman
- District: Gerger
- Population (2021): 281
- Time zone: UTC+3 (TRT)

Yağmurlu (Kurdish: Venkûk) is a village in the Gerger District, Adıyaman Province, Turkey. The village is populated by Kurds of the Pirvanan tribe and had a population of 281 in 2021.

The village has an Armenian population.

The hamlet of Kumluca is attached to the village.
