= Yenibardak, Gerger =

Village in Adıyaman Province, Turkey

Yenibardak
- Village
- Location within Turkey
- Coordinates: 38.149°N 39.115°E
- Country: Turkey
- Province: Adıyaman
- District: Gerger
- Population (2021): 471
- Time zone: UTC+3 (TRT)

Yenibardak (Kurdish: Xurso) is a village in the Gerger District, Adıyaman Province, Turkey. The village is populated by Kurds of the Xidiran tribe and had a population of 471 in 2021.

The hamlets of Aydoğdu, Ekinlik, Güneypınar, Kırmızıgül, Kırmızıtarla and Şahkulu are attached to the village.
