= Nakışlı, Gerger =

Village in Adıyaman Province, Turkey

Nakışlı
- Village
- Location within Turkey
- Coordinates: 38.016°N 38.858°E
- Country: Turkey
- Province: Adıyaman
- District: Gerger
- Population (2021): 219
- Time zone: UTC+3 (TRT)

Nakışlı (Kurdish: Horîyan) is a village in the Gerger District, Adıyaman Province, Turkey. The village is populated by Kurds of the Dirêjan tribe and had a population of 219 in 2021.

The hamlets of Akçalı, Boyalı and Sürmeli are attached to Nakışlı.
