= Dallarca, Gerger =

Village in Adıyaman Province, Turkey

Dallarca
- Village
- Location within Turkey
- Coordinates: 38.097°N 39.112°E
- Country: Turkey
- Province: Adıyaman
- District: Gerger
- Population (2021): 204
- Time zone: UTC+3 (TRT)

Dallarca (Kurdish: Baygûz) is a village in the Gerger District, Adıyaman Province, Turkey. The village is populated by Kurds of the Çûkan and Hecîyanî tribes and had a population of 204 in 2021.

The hamlets of Aydınlık, Erdoğmuş and Mazılı are attached to the village.
