= Çobanpınarı, Gerger =

Village in Adıyaman Province, Turkey

Çobanpınarı
- Village
- Location within Turkey
- Coordinates: 37.934°N 38.864°E
- Country: Turkey
- Province: Adıyaman
- District: Gerger
- Population (2021): 545
- Time zone: UTC+3 (TRT)

Çobanpınarı (Kurdish: Bilêl) is a village in the Gerger District, Adıyaman Province, Turkey. The village is populated by Kurds of the Mirdêsan tribe and had a population of 545 in 2021.

The hamlets of Budak, Köşebaşı and Tarlabaşı are attached to Çobanpınarı.
