= Yukarıdağlıca, Gerger =

Village in Adıyaman Province, Turkey

Yukarıdağlıca
- Village
- Location within Turkey
- Coordinates: 38.040°N 38.987°E
- Country: Turkey
- Province: Adıyaman
- District: Gerger
- Population (2021): 253
- Time zone: UTC+3 (TRT)

Yukarıdağlıca (Kurdish: Erbaûn) is a village in the Gerger District, Adıyaman Province, Turkey. The village is populated by Kurds of the Culûr tribe and had a population of 253 in 2021.

The hamlet of Üçyol is attached to the village.
