= Budaklı, Gerger =

Village in Adıyaman Province, Turkey

Budaklı
- Village
- Location within Turkey
- Coordinates: 38.0017°N 39.0111°E
- Country: Turkey
- Province: Adıyaman
- District: Gerger
- Population (2021): 133
- Time zone: UTC+3 (TRT)

Budaklı (Kurdish: Nîran) is a village in the Gerger District, Adıyaman Province, Turkey. The village is populated by Kurds of the Dêrsimî tribe and had a population of 133 in 2021.
