= Çamiçi, Gerger =

Village in Adıyaman Province, Turkey

Çamiçi
- Village
- Location within Turkey
- Coordinates: 38.037°N 38.940°E
- Country: Turkey
- Province: Adıyaman
- District: Gerger
- Population (2021): 137
- Time zone: UTC+3 (TRT)

Çamiçi (Kurdish: Jandirwang) is a village in the Gerger District, Adıyaman Province, Turkey. The village is populated by Kurds of the Culûr tribe and had a population of 137 in 2021.

The hamlets of Aşağı Akçalı, Çat, Salkım, Sarap and Şamak are attached to the village.
