= Gümüşkaşık, Gerger =

Village in Adıyaman Province, Turkey

Gümüşkaşık
- Village
- Location within Turkey
- Coordinates: 37.898°N 38.939°E
- Country: Turkey
- Province: Adıyaman
- District: Gerger
- Population (2021): 401
- Time zone: UTC+3 (TRT)

Gümüşkaşık (Kurdish: Keferdîş) is a village in the Gerger District, Adıyaman Province, Turkey. The village is populated by Kurds of Canbeg and Mirdêsan tribes and had a population of 401 in 2021.

The hamlet of Taşkapı is attached to the village.
