= Cevizpınar, Gerger =

Village in Adıyaman Province, Turkey

Cevizpınar
- Village
- Location within Turkey
- Coordinates: 38.178°N 39.173°E
- Country: Turkey
- Province: Adıyaman
- District: Gerger
- Population (2021): 331
- Time zone: UTC+3 (TRT)

Cevizpınar (Kurdish: Bîgo) is a village in the Gerger District, Adıyaman Province, Turkey. The village is populated by Kurds of the Xidiran tribe and had a population of 331 in 2021.

The hamlet of Doluca is attached to the village.
