= Konacık, Gerger =

Village in Adıyaman Province, Turkey

Konacık
- Village
- Location within Turkey
- Coordinates: 38.117°N 39.215°E
- Country: Turkey
- Province: Adıyaman
- District: Gerger
- Population (2021): 281
- Time zone: UTC+3 (TRT)

Konacık (Kurdish: Bibol) is a village in the Gerger District, Adıyaman Province, Turkey. The village is populated by Kurds of non-tribal affiliation and had a population of 281 in 2021.

The hamlets of Damlıca, Göl, Taşlı and Usluca are attached to the village.
