= Kesertaş, Gerger =

Village in Adıyaman Province, Turkey

Kesertaş
- Village
- Location within Turkey
- Coordinates: 37.976°N 38.963°E
- Country: Turkey
- Province: Adıyaman
- District: Gerger
- Population (2021): 149
- Time zone: UTC+3 (TRT)

Kesertaş (Kurdish: Berdeşo) is a village in the Gerger District, Adıyaman Province, Turkey. The village is populated by Kurds of the Culûr tribe and had a population of 149 in 2021.
