= Aşağıdağlıca, Gerger =

Village in Adıyaman Province, Turkey

Aşağıdağlıca
- Village
- Location within Turkey
- Coordinates: 38.0459°N 38.9879°E
- Country: Turkey
- Province: Adıyaman
- District: Gerger
- Population (2021): 175
- Time zone: UTC+3 (TRT)

Aşağıdağlıca (Kurdish: Erba'ûn) is a village in the Gerger District, Adıyaman Province, Turkey. The village is populated by Kurds of the Culûr tribe and had a population of 175 in 2021.

The hamlet of Sekebik is attached to the village.
