= Gündoğdu, Gerger =

Village in Adıyaman Province, Turkey

Gündoğdu
- Village
- Location within Turkey
- Coordinates: 37.965°N 38.899°E
- Country: Turkey
- Province: Adıyaman
- District: Gerger
- Population (2021): 250
- Time zone: UTC+3 (TRT)

Gündoğdu (Kurdish: Mişraq) is a village in the Gerger District, Adıyaman Province, Turkey. The village is populated by Kurds of the Qirwarî tribe and had a population of 250 in 2021.

The hamlet of Güzelyurt is attached to the village.
