= Shah Budak =

Beg of Dulkadir from 1465 to 1466 and 1472 to 1480

Beg of Dulkadir
- First reign: October 1465 – April 1466
- Predecessor: Malik Arslan
- Successor: Shah Suwar
- Second reign: 4 June 1472 – 1480
- Predecessor: Shah Suwar
- Successor: Ala al-Dawla Bozkurt

Ottoman Sanjak-bey of Vize
- Tenure: 1487–1489
- Died: 1500
- Issue: Shah Qubad Feyyaz; Zayn al-Din Malik Arslan
- House: Dulkadir
- Father: Suleiman
- Religion: Islam

Shah Budak (Turkish: Şah Budak; died 1500) was Beg of Dulkadir from October 1465 to April 1466 and 4 June 1472 to 1480. During the reign of his brother, Malik Arslan (r. 1454–1465), Shah Budak took refuge in Mamluk Egypt. He took advantage of the discord between Malik Arslan and the Mamluks by provoking the Mamluk sultan to commission his brother's assassination. Malik Arslan was killed in October 1465, and Shah Budak rose to the throne afterwards. However, before the Mamluk forces could come to his aid, he was defeated by his other brother, Shah Suwar (r. 1466–1472), who was backed by the Ottoman Sultan Mehmed II (r. 1444–1446, 1451–1481). Shah Suwar was engaged in continuous warfare against the Mamluk Sultanate, whereas Shah Budak took sides with the latter. Shah Suwar was caught by the Mamluk forces on 4 June 1472.

Shah Budak rose to the throne once again, and during his second reign, an initial challenge came from his nephew (Malik Arslan's son) Kilij Arslan Beg, who was in the service of the Aq Qoyunlu ruler Uzun Hasan (r. 1453–1478). However, the Aq Qoyunlu were fended off by the Mamluks and later defeated by the Ottomans at the Battle of Otlukbeli on 11 August 1473, which rendered Kilij Arslan's ambition to topple Shah Budak unfeasible. Mehmed II sponsored another brother of Shah Budak, Bozkurt (r. 1480–1515), who vanquished Shah Budak and claimed the throne in 1480. Shah Budak escaped to Egypt. He was eventually favored by Mehmed II's successor Bayezid II (r. 1481–1512). Shah Budak's attempt to overthrow Bozkurt in 1489 was unsuccessful. The Mamluks banished Shah Budak to Upper Egypt.

== Background ==
The Beylik of Dulkadir was founded by Zayn al-Din Qaraja (r. 1337–1353), a local Turkmen lord, as a client state of the Mamluk Sultanate, in southern Anatolia and northern Syria. Qaraja eventually rebelled against the Mamluks and was executed in 1353. The conflict between the Dulkadirids and the Mamluks persisted with the consecutive rule of his sons Ghars al-Din Khalil (r. 1353–1386) and Shaban Suli (r. 1386–1398), who were both assassinated on the orders of the Mamluk Sultan Barquq (r. 1382–1389, 1390–1399). With the reigns of Shah Budak's grandfather, Mehmed (r. 1399–1442), and father, Suleiman (r. 1442–1454), the Dulkadirids attempted to forge amicable relations both with the Ottoman state and the Mamluk Sultanate by arranging marriages between their daughters and the sons of the Ottoman sultans. During Malik Arslan's (r. 1454–1465) reign, the Dulkadirids were involved in the accession wars within the Karamanids as well as a struggle against the Aq Qoyunlu ruler Uzun Hasan (r. 1453–1478).

== Rise to power and first reign ==
During the rule of his brother, Malik Arslan, Shah Budak took refuge under the Mamluk Sultan Sayf al-Din Khushqadam (r. 1461–1467). Shah Budak encouraged the sultan to commission Malik Arslan's assassination with the hopes that he could rise to the throne. Khushqadam dispatched a fedayeen from Cairo to the north. Malik Arslan was murdered in October 1465 at a mosque in Elbistan, during the Friday prayer.

Shah Budak took over the throne by attaining the manshūr (diploma to rule) from the Mamluks. On 30 November 1465, the Dulkadirid ambassador arrived in Cairo confirming Shah Budak's accession. Khushqadam thus sent an honorary robe to the new ruler. Shah Budak instantly faced opposition from his subjects who accused him of parricide and appealed to the Ottoman Sultan Mehmed II (r. 1444–1446, 1451–1481) to install Shah Budak's claimant brother who he harbored, Shah Suwar (r. 1466–1472), in Elbistan. Shah Suwar had previously taken part in Mehmed II's campaigns and was made the sanjak-bey of Chirmen, located in Thrace. On 4 December, Mehmed II appointed Shah Suwar as the wali (governor) of Bozok and Artukabad through a firman, which formerly belonged to his father, Suleiman. Shah Suwar was further given Dulkadir and Bozok nomads under his authority, who had scattered over the region near Bozok (Yozgat) and Tokat disgruntled by Shah Budak's reign or for other reasons. Backed by the Ottomans, Shah Suwar marched on his brother. Shah Budak proclaimed that any attack on him would be to the Mamluks. Hence, Khushqadam dispatched Berdi Beg, the governor of Aleppo, to come to Shah Budak's aid. Before the Mamluk forces could intervene, Shah Suwar defeated his brother near Zamantu Castle and reclaimed the throne, prompting Berdi Beg to return in April 1466.

== Clashes with Shah Suwar ==
Shah Budak was a member of an army, under the command of Governor of Damascus Berdi Beg, that reached the Dulkadirid realm in September 1467. In Turnadağ, near Göksun, on 4 October 1467, Shah Suwar led an unexpected attack, capturing Berdi Beg and killing several Mamluk commanders. Shah Budak took part in another campaign initiated by the new Mamluk Sultan Qaitbay (r. 1468–96). This army was led by Uzbek, the governor of Damascus, and arrived in Aleppo, where it was joined by auxiliary troops. The Dulkadirid forces confronted the Mamluks on the left bank of the Ceyhan River to the southwest of Marash in April 1469. The Dulkadirids were overpowered, and Shah Suwar's brother Mughulbay was killed in the battle. Shah Suwar fled to Kars through the mountains, with his forces stationed on the paths going to the town. In June 1469, when the Mamluk army was preparing to return to Egypt due to a shortage of subsistence, the Dulkadirids struck back. Though casualties were significant, Uzbek and Shah Budak were able to return to Egypt.

The locations of towns in Anatolia and Syria.

Another army departed Cairo in February 1471. Its leader Emir Yashbak min Mahdi was further trusted with great authority such as the liberty to appoint and dismiss any official in Syria. The army once again included Shah Budak among its ranks and absorbed various auxiliary Turkmen forces when it reached Aleppo in May 1471. In June, the Mamluk forces seized control of Aintab from the Dulkadirids after a nine-day siege. Through the confession of a captive, the Mamluks discovered the location of the Dulkadirid forces in the region. They killed 28 enemy troops, including some of the Dulkadirids' foremost commanders. On 9 August, Shah Suwar sent a representative and many gifts to the Mamluk commander in Aintab to request peace. The negotiations were inconclusive, and after learning of Shah Suwar's flight to the south, Yashbak dispersed members of his retinue around the area, which forced Shah Suwar to retreat to Marash in August.

One last expedition by Yashbak took back much of the lands the Mamluk Sultanate had lost to Shah Suwar, whose support from the Ottomans dwindled, prompting him to seclude himself in Zamantu Castle in inner Anatolia. Yashbak approached Zamantu on 22 May 1472, and following a series of failed negotiations based on Shah Suwar's conditions to surrender, he was finally caught and fettered.

== Second reign ==
Shah Budak was enthroned while Shah Suwar and his other rival brothers were being transported to Cairo for their execution. Although many of Shah Budak's brothers were eliminated from the regnal competition, another challenge came from Kilij Arslan Beg, the son of Shah Budak's deceased brother, Malik Arslan. Kilij Arslan had settled in Tabriz and entered the service of Uzun Hasan. He stood out as a military personnel in the latter's campaigns, including the war with Abu Sa'id Mirza in 1469 and the siege of Ahlat. Shortly after Shah Suwar's hanging in 1472, Uzun Hasan installed Pir Ahmed and Kasım in the Karamanid realm and made an effort to facilitate arms trade through the Republic of Venice. His army, under the command of Bektashoghlu Umar Beg and Kilij Arslan, was part of the vanguard forces that passed through the Ottoman or Dulkadirid domains. Aq Qoyunlu forces thus penetrated the Ottoman realm and reached the Karamanid lands, ransacking Tokat along the way, whereas Uzun Hasan struck from the east and seized Kahta and Gerger, demanding that Shah Budak submit. In response to Shah Budak's call for Mamluk aid, an Egyptian army led by Yashbak repelled the Aq Qoyunlu forces, who had taken control of Malatya, to the opposite side of the Euphrates. The Ottoman victory at Otlukbeli against the Aq Qoyunlu the following year eliminated threats from the east, as well as Kilij Arslan's wish to take over. Having secured his reign, Shah Budak continued to reemphasize his allegiance to Qaitbay, such as his bestowal of lavish presents on him in Aleppo in the fall of 1478, when Shah Budak was traveling in Syria with his sons and one of his nephews (Shah Suwar's son).

Shah Budak later sent an aid of a thousand cavalry to his brother Bozkurt, whose wife and son were captured by the sanjak-bey Mihaloghlu Ali Bey in response to Bozkurt's raid in the region of Sivas. With Shah Budak's troops, Bozkurt attacked Ali Bey near Çiğnem Stream, forcing him to flee to a nearby fortress. Afraid of the repercussions of his animosity with an Ottoman official, Bozkurt traveled to Constantinople to appeal to Mehmed II. The latter, wishing to restore the Ottoman influence over the Dulkadirids, made Bozkurt the sanjak-bey of Chirmen. Mehmed II strove to enthrone Bozkurt after he received an unfriendly response from Qaitbay when he brought up his earlier promise of leaving his realm to the Ottomans in exchange for their help against Shah Suwar. The Mamluks, on the other hand, were in a vulnerable position following their defeat by the Aq Qoyunlu ruler Yaqub (r. 1478–90) in Ruha in November 1480. In this conflict, Yashbak was executed. Mehmed II thus gave Bozkurt the sanjak of Kırşehir. Bozkurt marched on Shah Budak with auxiliary Ottoman forces. He initially faced defeat as some of the Turkmens under him switched sides. The Ottoman forces led by Bayezid's kapıcıbaşı fled to Sis, where they were massacred by the city's Mamluk governor, Sakalsizoghlu Yusuf, who sent their heads to Cairo, where Qaitbay organized a game of jereed to be played with them. Mehmed II allowed Bozkurt a larger army under his command, which finally defeated Shah Budak near the Çiğnem Stream, though contemporary historians did not disclose the date of the encounter between the brothers. In March 1480, Shah Budak requested admittance to the Mamluk territory near Aleppo from its governor. Ibn Tulun recorded Shah Budak's arrival in Damascus on 14 February 1481; he had lost the throne sometime before this date. When Uzbek, the governor of Damascus, was in the region tasked with countering the fall of Ruha, he did not lend a hand to restore Shah Budak's rule and instead imprisoned him at the Citadel of Damascus. Contemporary chronicler Sayrafi described Qaitbay's contentment from Shah Budak's imprisonment due to his failure to defend the Mamluks.

== Attempt to regain the throne ==
In 1485, the governor of Damascus, Kachmas, liberated Shah Budak without the sultan's permission and granted him horses, money, and an honorary robe, deploying him to the Damascene army. Although not detailed by the Syrian historian Ibn Tulun, Kachmas likely intended to use Shah Budak to overthrow Ala al-Dawla Bozkurt, whose relation with the Mamluks had taken a bad turn. However, Kachmas soon changed his mind and returned Shah Budak to prison. On 26 September 1487, Shah Budak managed to escape prison with the help of his wife and slaves, who often visited his chambers. He traveled to the Bagras Mountains, where allied Turkmen lords assisted him in passing the Taurus Mountains in the direction of the Ottoman lands. The Ottoman ruler Bayezid II welcomed him and appointed him as the sanjak-bey of Vize, which was a warning to Ala al-Dawla that the Ottomans could attempt to depose him. Ala al-Dawla's revolt against the Ottomans prompted Bayezid to take action. He declared Shah Budak to be the legitimate ruler of Dulkadir by granting him a diploma and providing him with the assistance of Hiziroghlu Mehmed Pasha and Mihaloghlu Iskender Bey, the sanjak-beys of Little Rum (Amasya and Sivas) and Kayseri, respectively. Shah Budak first arrived in Kırşehir, where he caught the leader of the town's garrison Shahruh, who was the son of Ala al-Dawla. Shah Budak blinded Shahruh in retribution for the treatment his son Feyyaz had received in 1484. Shah Budak's forces largely originated from the Ottomans, rather than allied Turkmens. He succeeded in occupying a portion of the Dulkadirid domains, which elicited powerful opposition from his brother. Qaitbay learned of the conflict in March 1489. In May, Mamluk forces left Cairo to help Ala al-Dawla's resistance against Shah Budak, which facilitated the eventual ouster of Shah Budak. Shah Budak took his son Feyyaz with him and escaped to Syria and later to Cairo, where he begged Qaitbay for forgiveness. Qaitbay instead exiled him to Upper Egypt in November 1489. Shah Budak died in 1500.

== Family ==
Shah Budak's sons included Shah Qubad Feyyaz and Zayn al-Din Malik Arslan. The latter was made the na'ib (viceroy) of Homs by the Mamluks and was killed in 1516.

== Bibliography ==
- Har-El, Shai (1995). Struggle for Domination in the Middle East: The Ottoman-Mamluk War, 1485-91. E.J. Brill. ISBN 9004101802. OCLC 624096003.
- Öztuna, Yılmaz (2005). Devletler ve hanedanlar: Türkiye (1074-1990) (in Turkish). Ministry of Culture. ISBN 9751704693. OCLC 949531568.
- Venzke, Margaret L. (2017). "Dulkadir". In Fleet, Kate; Krämer, Gudrun; Matringe, Denis; Nawas, John; Rowson, Everett (eds.). Encyclopaedia of Islam (3rd ed.). Brill Online. doi:10.1163/1573-3912_ei3_COM_27743. ISSN 1873-9830.
- Yinanç, Refet (1989). Dulkadir Beyliği (in Turkish). Ankara: Turkish Historical Society Press. ISBN 9751601711. OCLC 21676736.
