= Korulu, Gerger =

Village in Adıyaman Province, Turkey

Korulu
- Village
- Location within Turkey
- Coordinates: 37.882°N 38.970°E
- Country: Turkey
- Province: Adıyaman
- District: Gerger
- Population (2021): 337
- Time zone: UTC+3 (TRT)

Korulu (Kurdish: Barzo) is a village in the Gerger District, Adıyaman Province, Turkey. The village is populated by Kurds of the Canbeg tribe and had a population of 337 in 2021.

The hamlet of Koçlu is attached to the village.
