= Koşarlar, Gerger =

Village in Adıyaman Province, Turkey

Koşarlar
- Village
- Location within Turkey
- Coordinates: 38.022°N 38.906°E
- Country: Turkey
- Province: Adıyaman
- District: Gerger
- Population (2021): 193
- Time zone: UTC+3 (TRT)

Koşarlar (Kurdish: Nîrîn) is a village in the Gerger District, Adıyaman Province, Turkey. The village is populated by Kurds of the Dirêjan and Ziran tribes and had a population of 193 in 2021.

The hamlets of Arıca and Bozatlı are attached to the village.
