= Suleiman of Dulkadir =

Beg of Dulkadir from 1442 to 1454

Suleiman Beg

Beg of Dulkadir
- Reign: October 1442 – 28 August 1454
- Predecessor: Nasir al-Din Mehmed
- Successor: Malik Arslan

Wali of Kayseri
- First reign: ? – July 1435
- Predecessor: ?
- Successor: Direct Mamluk control (Note: The Karamanids led a joint attack with the Ramadanids and others and restored direct Mamluk control in Kayseri.)
- Second reign: 1436/early 1437 – October 1442
- Predecessor: Direct Mamluk control
- Successor: ?
- Died: 28 August 1454
- Issue Among others: Malik Arslan; Shah Budak; Shah Suwar; Ala al-Dawla Bozkurt; Sitti Şah Mükrime Khatun
- House: Dulkadir
- Father: Nasir al-Din Mehmed
- Mother: Khadija Khatun
- Religion: Islam

Suleiman Beg (Turkish: Süleyman Bey; died 28 August 1454) was the ruler of Dulkadir, a principality in southern Anatolia, from 1442 until his death. During the reign of his father, Nasir al-Din Mehmed (r. 1399–1442), he served as the wali (governor) of Kayseri. His reign was relatively uneventful. His major accomplishment was the arrangement of the political marriages of his daughters to the rulers of two major powers that the Dulkadirids formed a buffer region between, the Ottoman Sultan Mehmed II (r. 1444–1446, 1451–1481) and the Mamluk Sultan Sayf al-Din Jaqmaq (r. 1438–1453). Towards the end of his reign, Suleiman was involved in the internal struggle of the Aq Qoyunlu, members of whom sought safety under him. Following the end of this conflict, Suleiman led an unsuccessful siege on Çemişgezek. He had numerous offspring, among whom four sons would consecutively rule the state. He was succeeded by Malik Arslan (r. 1454–1466).

== Background ==
The Beylik of Dulkadir was founded by Zayn al-Din Qaraja (r. 1337–1353), a Turkmen chieftain, as a client state of the Mamluk Sultanate, in southern Anatolia and northern Syria. Qaraja eventually rebelled against the Mamluks and was executed in 1353. The conflict between the Dulkadirids and the Mamluks persisted with the consecutive rule of his sons Ghars al-Din Khalil (r. 1353–1386) and Shaban Suli (r. 1386–1398), who were both assassinated on the orders of the Mamluk Sultan Barquq (r. 1382–1389, 1390–1399).

== Early life ==
Suleiman was born to Khadija Khatun, the daughter of the Anatolian ruler Kadi Burhan al-Din, and Nasir al-Din Mehmed (r. 1399–1442), the fifth Beg of Dulkadir. During his reign, Mehmed attempted to forge amicable relations with the Ottoman state and the Mamluk Sultanate. As a result of Nasir al-Din Mehmed's support for the Ottoman prince Mehmed Chelebi during the Ottoman Interregnum (1402–13), Suleiman took part in Mehmed Chelebi's clash with his rival brother Musa Chelebi in Rumelia in the spring of 1413. He governed Kayseri after his father was granted control of it in April 1419 as a reward for Dulkadirid participation in the Mamluk campaign against the Karamanids, a state in central Anatolia. In 1435, the Karamanids attempted to negotiate the restoration of their control of the city with the Mamluks. Although the diplomatic mission of Suleiman's mother, Khadija Khatun, in Cairo was successful in preventing the loss of Kayseri, the Karamanids and the Ramadanids captured the city in July 1435. At the request of his father, Suleiman traveled to Gallipoli, where the Ottoman Sultan Murad II (r. 1421–1444, 1446–1451) was momentarily residing, and was authorized military support to recover Kayseri from the Karamanids, who were invested in internal struggles. He was able to regain the city in 1436 or early 1437.

== Reign ==
Suleiman was fairly experienced when he ascended to the throne after his father's death in October 1442. His reign was largely devoid of major threats. He continued his father's policy of strengthening ties with the Ottomans and the Mamluk Sultanate through marriage and other means. Aiming to secure an ally against the Karamanids and the Qara Qoyunlu, a tribe challenging the eastern Ottoman frontier, Murad II consulted with his vizier Halil Pasha and sent an envoy to Elbistan to choose one of Suleiman's five daughters to marry with his heir (and eventual successor) Mehmed (known as Mehmed II or Mehmed the Conqueror; r. 1444–1446, 1451–1481). The wedding of Sittişah Hatun and Mehmed lasted two months in November–December 1450. The dowry payment was brought to Elbistan by a cortege including all Ottoman walis (governors) and their consorts, and Murad II additionally invited the kadis (judges), ulama (Islamic dignitaries), poets, and others in his realm to join the wedding. Suleiman's sister and consort of the Mamluk Sultan Sayf al-Din Jaqmaq (r. 1438–1453) had died in April 1449 after having contracted the plague, and Suleiman instead married his daughter to Jaqmaq. By marrying two of his daughters to neighboring major powers, who were at peace at the time, Suleiman ensured protection against the Karamanids to the west and the Qara Qoyunlu and Aq Qoyunlu to the east.

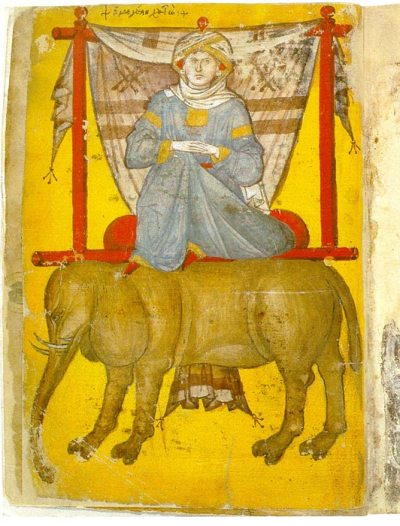
Byzantine-style portrait of Sittişah Hatun. The Greek text above reads ἡ μεγάλη Χατώ, meaning 'the great khatun.'

By 1450, the Aq Qoyunlu leader Jahangir (r. 1444–54), was facing opposition to his rule from his uncles and other Aq Qoyunlu dignitaries. Kasim Beg, who was one of Jahangir's uncles, was subsequently forced to take refuge in Suleiman's court. Jahangir's other uncles sought help from Jahan Shah, the head of the Qara Qoyunlu (r. 1438–1467). Amidst Jahan Shah's pursuit of Jahangir, the Mamluk Sultan Jaqmaq requested Suleiman to prevent Jahangir from escaping into Syria in October 1451. Despite the demand of the Mamluks, Suleiman and their frontier governors were in covert support of Jahangir and his brother Uzun Hasan, future ruler of the Aq Qoyunlu (r. 1452–1478). Jahan Shah reached Harpoot, while the rest of the Qara Qoyunlu forces passed the Euphrates and marched on Malatya, within the Mamluk borders, to thwart Dulkadirid support of the Aq Qoyunlu. This prompted Jaqmaq to instead decree that every Syrian Mamluk governor help his father-in-law Suleiman. Fearing the worsening of the Mamluk–Qara Qoyunlu relations, Jahan Shah gave up on attacking the Dulkadirids and was forced to make peace with Jahangir the next year upon the impending threat of the Timurid ruler Abul-Qasim Babur Mirza.

Subsequent to the end of the Aq Qoyunlu–Qara Qoyunlu conflict, Suleiman marched on Çemişgezek with a thirty-thousand-strong army to subdue its Kurdish ruler Sheikh Hasan, who was competing to gain control of the castles of Gobrak and Vibrak, thus jeopardizing the eastern frontier of the Dulkadirids. Suleiman's siege of the city was unsuccessful and prompted him to retreat to Harpoot. During his last years, Suleiman had grown fat and was unable to ride a horse. He died on 28 August 1454, survived by many offspring from his crowded harem. The throne was inherited by his son Malik Arslan (r. 1454–1466). Suleiman left some architectural legacy that included the Grand Mosque, the largest mosque in Marash.

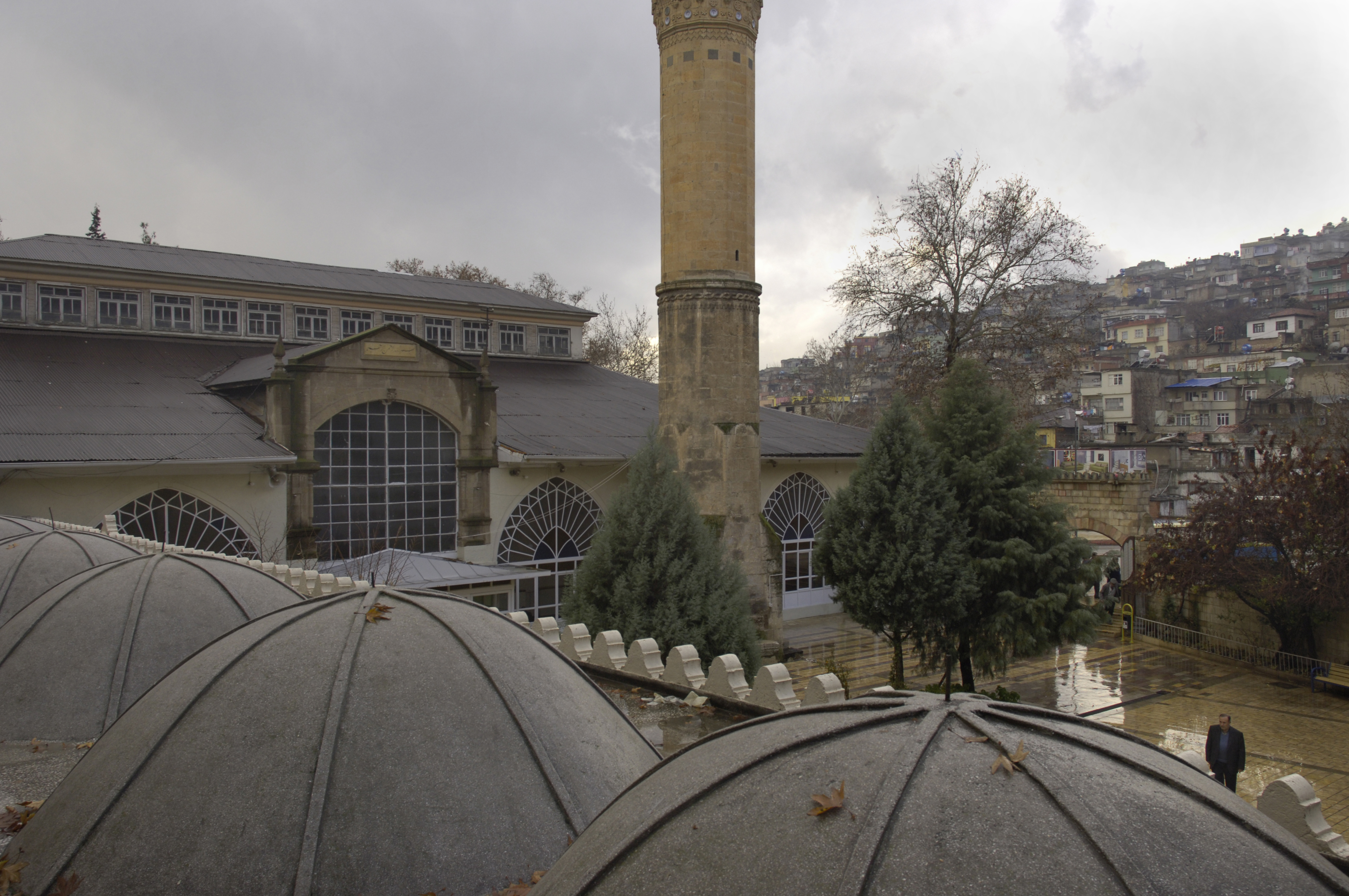
Grand Mosque of Marash

== Family ==
Suleiman's sons included:

- Malik Arslan
- Shah Budak
- Shah Suwar
- Ala al-Dawla Bozkurt
- Abd al-Razzaq
- Isa
- Hudadad
- Mughulbay
- Yunus
- Salman
- Erdivane
- Yahya

He had at least five daughters, including:

- Misir Khatun
- Sittişah Hatun, the consort of Mehmed II of the Ottoman Empire
- Another daughter who married the Mamluk Sultan Jaqmaq

Sitti Hatun is believed to have not given birth to a child from her marriage with Mehmed II, who abandoned her in Edirne (where she would die), when he ascended to the throne.

== Bibliography ==
- Venzke, Margaret L. (2000). "The Case of a Dulgadir-Mamluk Iqṭāʿ: A Re-Assessment of the Dulgadir Principality and Its Position within the Ottoman-Mamluk Rivalry". Journal of the Economic and Social History of the Orient. 43 (3): 399–474.
- Venzke, Margaret L. (2017). "Dulkadir". In Fleet, Kate; Krämer, Gudrun; Matringe, Denis; Nawas, John; Rowson, Everett (eds.). Encyclopaedia of Islam (3rd ed.). Brill Online. doi:10.1163/1573-3912_ei3_COM_27743. ISSN 1873-9830.
- Yinanç, Refet (1989). Dulkadir Beyliği (in Turkish). Ankara: Turkish Historical Society Press. ISBN 9751601711. OCLC 21676736.
