= Demirtaş, Gerger =

Village in Adıyaman Province, Turkey

Demirtaş
- Village
- Location within Turkey
- Coordinates: 38.132°N 39.072°E
- Country: Turkey
- Province: Adıyaman
- District: Gerger
- Population (2021): 132
- Time zone: UTC+3 (TRT)

Demirtaş (Kurdish: Melho) is a village in the Gerger District, Adıyaman Province, Turkey. The village is populated by Kurds of the Melîkzadeyan tribe and had a population of 132 in 2021.

The hamlets of Alaca and Güzelce are attached to the village.
