= Çifthisar, Gerger =

Village in Adıyaman Province, Turkey

Çifthisar
- Village
- Location within Turkey
- Coordinates: 37.979°N 38.913°E
- Country: Turkey
- Province: Adıyaman
- District: Gerger
- Population (2021): 123
- Time zone: UTC+3 (TRT)

Çifthisar (Kurdish: Çefsar) is a village in the Gerger District, Adıyaman Province, Turkey. The village is populated by Kurds of the Mirdêsan tribe and had a population of 123 in 2021.
