= Gerger District =

- District
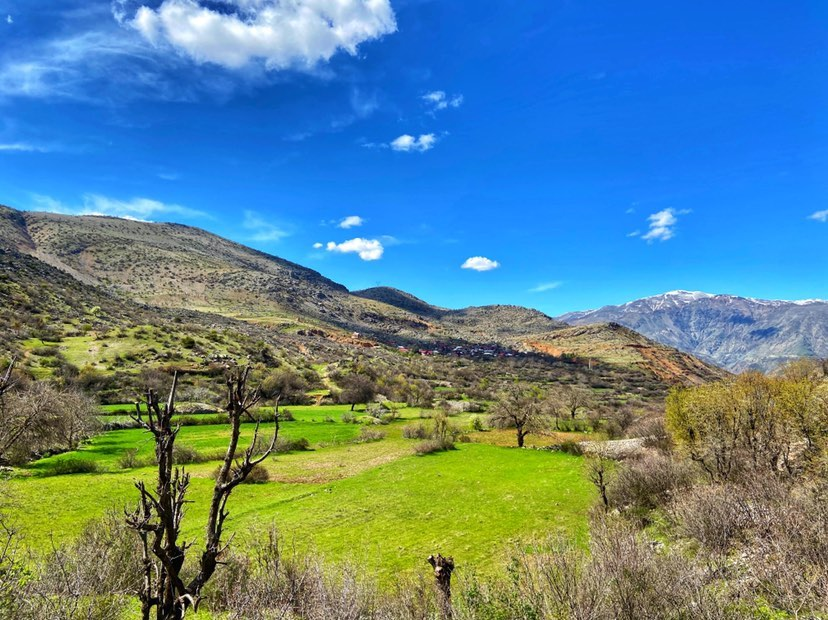
- Image of Ortaca

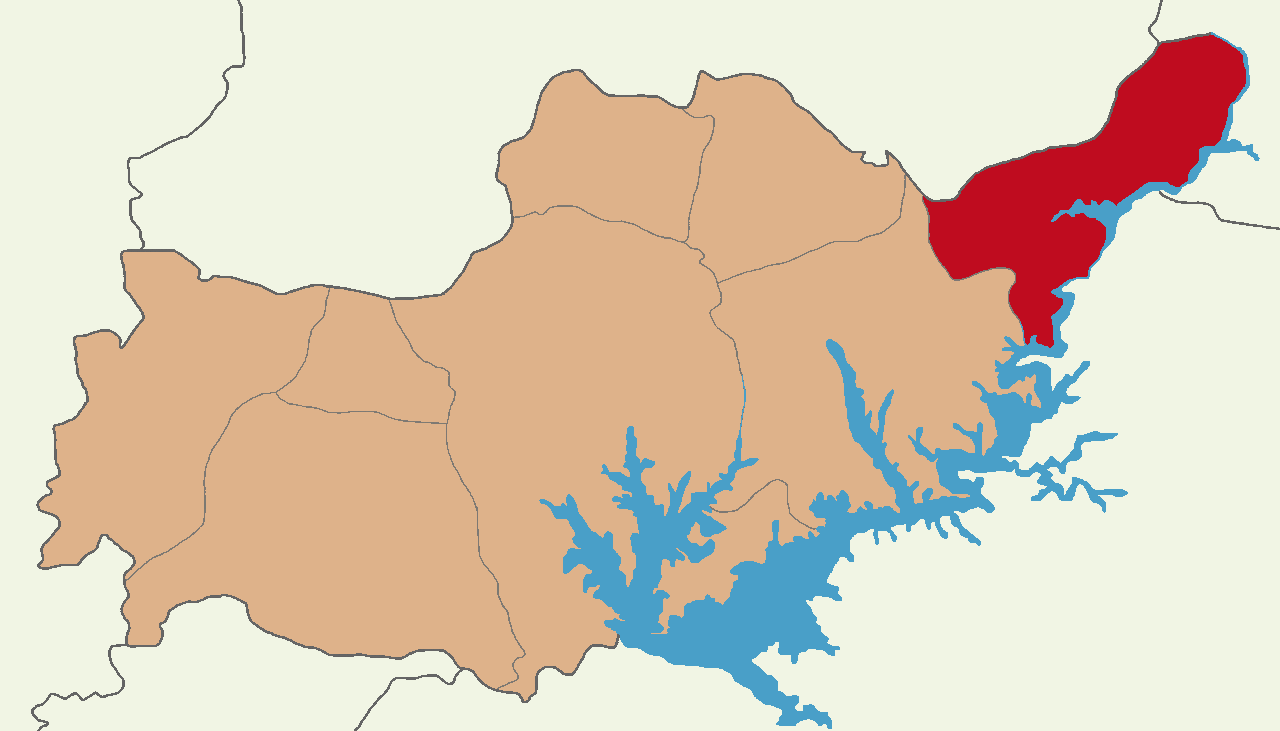
- Map showing Gerger District in Adıyaman Province

- Location within Turkey
- Coordinates: 38°02′N 39°02′E
- Country: Turkey
- Province: Adıyaman
- Seat: Gerger

Government
  - Kaymakam: Ömer Saygılı
- Area: 668 km^{2} (258 sq mi)
- Population (2021): 16,416
  - Density: 24.6/km^{2} (63.6/sq mi)
- Time zone: UTC+3 (TRT)

Gerger District is a district of Adıyaman Province of Turkey. Its seat is the town Gerger. Its area is 668 km^{2}, and its population is 16,416 (2021). The district was established in 1954.

== Composition ==
There is one municipality in Gerger District:

- Gerger (Aldûş)

There are 45 villages in Gerger District:

- Açma
- Ağaçlı (Sevkan)
- Aşağıdağlıca (Erbaun)
- Beşgöze (Kortiyan)
- Beybostan
- Budaklı (Nîran)
- Burçaklı (Mirtan)
- Çamiçi
- Cevizpınar
- Çifthisar (Merdîs)
- Çobanpınarı (Bilêle)
- Dağdeviren
- Dallarca (Bagoz)
- Demirtaş (Melho)
- Eskikent (Temsiyas)
- Geçitli (Averag)
- Gölyurt (Tillo)
- Gönen
- Gözpınar
- Gümüşkaşık (Keferdiş)
- Gündoğdu (Mişrak)
- Güngörmüş (Petirge)
- Gürgenli (Pêşwal)
- Güzelsu (Cimik)
- Kaşyazı (Lagin)
- Kesertaş (Perdusu)
- Kılıç (Bekiran)
- Köklüce (Olbiş)
- Konacık (Bibol)
- Korulu (Barzo)
- Koşarlar (Nîrîn)
- Kütüklü (Haşur)
- Nakışlı (Horiyan)
- Onevler (Golani)
- Ortaca (Haburman)
- Oymaklı
- Saraycık (Masronî)
- Seyitmahmut
- Sutepe (Xizori)
- Üçkaya (Draxo)
- Yağmurlu (Vankuk)
- Yayladalı (Gîvdîş)
- Yenibardak
- Yeşilyurt (Venk)
- Yukarıdağlıca

There are 104 hamlets in Gerger District.
