= Burçaklı, Gerger =

Village in Adıyaman Province, Turkey

Burçaklı
- Village
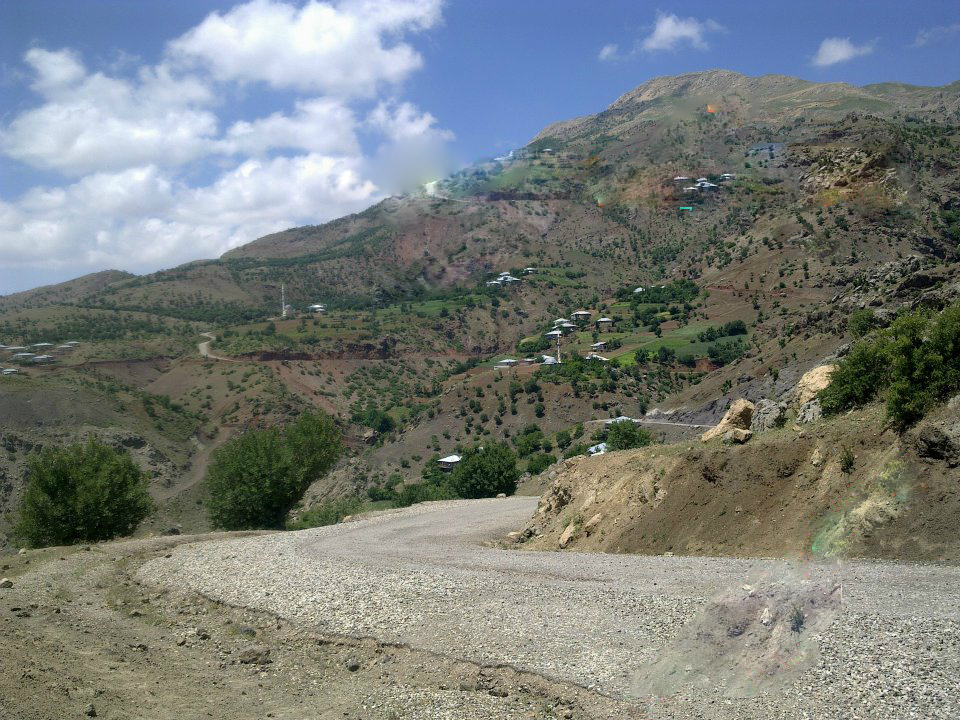

- Location within Turkey
- Coordinates: 38.038°N 38.956°E
- Country: Turkey
- Province: Adıyaman
- District: Gerger
- Population (2021): 208
- Time zone: UTC+3 (TRT)

Burçaklı (Kurdish: Mirtan) is a village in the Gerger District, Adıyaman Province, Turkey. The village is populated by Kurds of the Culûr tribe and had a population of 208 in 2021.

The hamlets of Bayır, Kanber, Kayalar, Kızık and Ocaklar are attached to the village.
