= Geçitli, Gerger =

Village in Adıyaman Province, Turkey

Geçitli
- Village
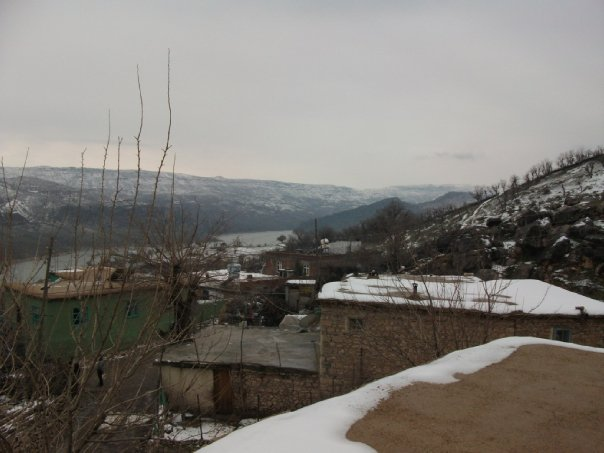

- Location within Turkey
- Coordinates: 38.056°N 39.189°E
- Country: Turkey
- Province: Adıyaman
- District: Gerger
- Population (2021): 226
- Time zone: UTC+3 (TRT)

Geçitli (Kurdish: Ewerek) is a village in the Gerger District, Adıyaman Province, Turkey. The village is populated by Kurds of the Çûkan and Hecîmihemedan tribes and had a population of 226 in 2021.

The hamlets of Bağlar, Bulutlu, Kıllık and Komşular are attached to the village.
