= Yayladalı, Gerger =

Village in Adıyaman Province, Turkey

Yayladalı
- Village
- Location within Turkey
- Coordinates: 37.9601°N 38.9181°E
- Country: Turkey
- Province: Adıyaman
- District: Gerger
- Population (2021): 309
- Time zone: UTC+3 (TRT)

Yayladalı (Kurdish: Gîvdîş) is a village in the Gerger District, Adıyaman Province, Turkey. The village is populated by Kurds of the Mirdêsan tribe and had a population of 309 in 2021.

The hamlets of Kemerli, Oyalı and Soğanlı are attached to the village.
