= Seyitmahmut, Gerger =

Village in Adıyaman Province, Turkey

Seyitmahmut
- Village
- Location within Turkey
- Coordinates: 37.941°N 38.967°E
- Country: Turkey
- Province: Adıyaman
- District: Gerger
- Population (2021): 383
- Time zone: UTC+3 (TRT)

Seyitmahmut is a village in the Gerger District, Adıyaman Province, Turkey. The village is populated by Turks and had a population of 383 in 2021.

The hamlets of Dallı and Erenler are attached to the village.
