= Saraycık, Gerger =

Village in Adıyaman Province, Turkey

Saraycık
- Village
- Location within Turkey
- Coordinates: 38.024°N 38.887°E
- Country: Turkey
- Province: Adıyaman
- District: Gerger
- Population (2021): 150
- Time zone: UTC+3 (TRT)

Saraycık (Kurdish: Mansûran) is a village in the Gerger District, Adıyaman Province, Turkey. The village is populated by Kurds of the Dirêjan tribe and had a population of 150 in 2021.

The hamlet of Başak is attached to Saraycık.
