= Açma, Gerger =

Village in Adıyaman Province, Turkey

Açma
- Village
- Location within Turkey
- Coordinates: 37.98731°N 38.94753°E
- Country: Turkey
- Province: Adıyaman
- District: Gerger
- Population (2021): 171
- Time zone: UTC+3 (TRT)

Açma is a village in the Gerger District, Adıyaman Province, Turkey. The village is populated by Kurds of the Culûr tribe and had a population of 171 in 2021.

The hamlets of Çukurca and Yuvacık are attached to the village.
