= Eskikent, Gerger =

Village in Adıyaman Province, Turkey

Eskikent
- Village
- Location within Turkey
- Coordinates: 38.044°N 39.058°E
- Country: Turkey
- Province: Adıyaman
- District: Gerger
- Population (2021): 117
- Time zone: UTC+3 (TRT)

Eskikent (Kurdish: Temsîyas) is a village in the Gerger District, Adıyaman Province, Turkey. The village is populated by Kurds of the Çûkan and Ferşatan tribes and had a population of 117 in 2021.

The hamlets of Kula and Tepebaşı are attached to the village.

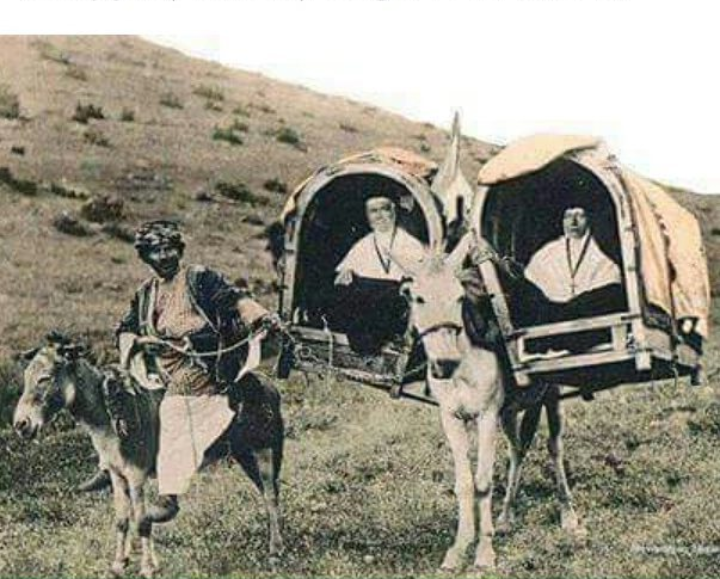
Armenian Catholic nuns touring near the village in early 20th century
