= Onevler, Gerger =

Village in Adıyaman Province, Turkey

Onevler
- Village
- Location within Turkey
- Coordinates: 38.097°N 39.153°E
- Country: Turkey
- Province: Adıyaman
- District: Gerger
- Population (2021): 208
- Time zone: UTC+3 (TRT)

Onevler (Kurdish: Helûl) is a village in the Gerger District, Adıyaman Province, Turkey. The village is populated by Kurds of the Çerkezan and Çûkan tribes and had a population of 208 in 2021.

The hamlets of Kozağacı and Yağmurlu are attached to the village.
