= Üçkaya, Gerger =

Village in Adıyaman Province, Turkey

Üçkaya
- Village
- Location within Turkey
- Coordinates: 38.007°N 39.055°E
- Country: Turkey
- Province: Adıyaman
- District: Gerger
- Population (2021): 239
- Time zone: UTC+3 (TRT)

Üçkaya (Kurdish: Komik) is a village in the Gerger District, Adıyaman Province, Turkey. The village is populated by Kurds of the Pirvanan tribe and had a population of 239 in 2021.

The hamlets of Esenbağ, Taraksu and Üzümlü are attached to the village.
