= Kütüklü, Gerger =

Village in Adıyaman Province, Turkey

Kütüklü
- Village
- Location within Turkey
- Coordinates: 37.9642°N 38.812°E
- Country: Turkey
- Province: Adıyaman
- District: Gerger
- Population (2021): 218
- Time zone: UTC+3 (TRT)

Kütüklü (Kurdish: Heşûr) is a village in the Gerger District, Adıyaman Province, Turkey. The village is populated by Kurds of the Mirdêsan tribe and had a population of 218 in 2021.

The hamlets of Çetin and Yamaç are attached to the village.
