= Kılıç (surname) =

Kılıç is a Turkish name and surname meaning "sword". Notable people with the surname include:

== People ==
- Ahmet Kilic (born 1984), Dutch footballer of Turkish descent
- Akif Çağatay Kılıç (born 1976), Turkish politician and government minister
- Ali Kılıç (1890–1971), Turkish military officer and politician
- Dündar Kılıç (1935–1999), infamous Turkish mob boss
- Erman Kılıç (born 1983), Turkish professional footballer
- Gökhan Kılıç (born 1988), Turkish weightlifter
- Gündüz Kılıç (1919–1980), Turkish footballer
- Haşim Kılıç (born 1950), Turkish judge
- Lioubov Kılıç (born 1977), Russian female volleyball player
- Memet Kiliç (born 1967), German-Turkish politician (The Greens)
- Ramazan Serkan Kılıç (born 1984), Turkish volleyball player
- Suat Kılıç (born 1972), Turkish lawyer and government minister
- Yakup Kılıç (born 1986), Turkish boxer

Kılınç is another spelling of the word Kılıç. It may refer to:

- David Kilinc (born 1992), Swiss-Italian professional footballer
- Tuncer Kılınç (born 1940), retired Turkish general.
