= Ortaca, Gerger =

Ortaca
- Village
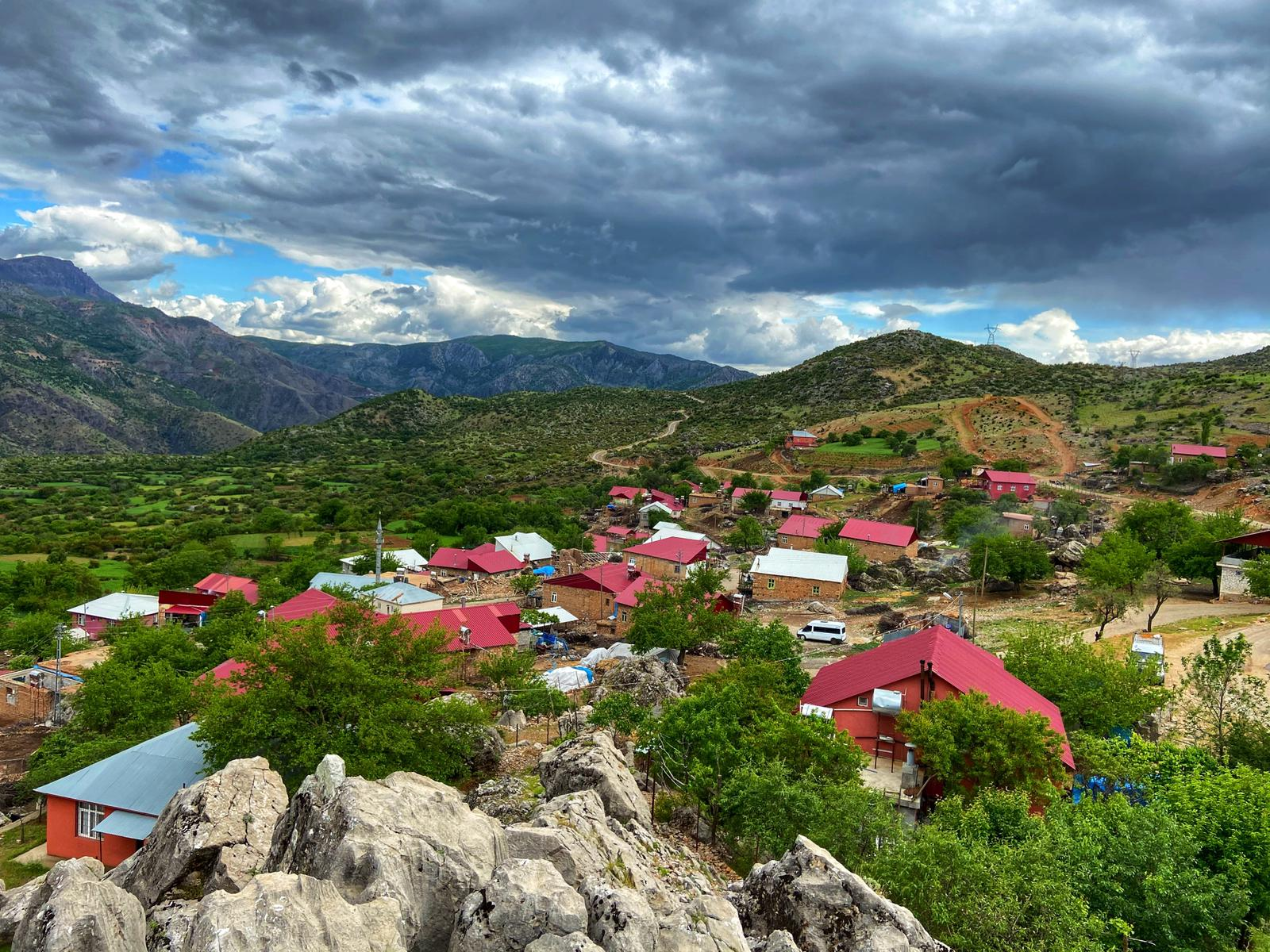

- Location within Turkey
- Coordinates: 38.163°N 39.243°E
- Country: Turkey
- Province: Adıyaman
- District: Gerger
- Population (2021): 307
- Time zone: UTC+3 (TRT)

Ortaca (Kurdish: Hebirman) is a village in the Gerger District, Adıyaman Province, Turkey. The village is populated by Kurds of the Xidiran tribe and had a population of 307 in 2021. The village is in the rugged terrain of the southeastern Anatolia Region, situated at coordinates 38.163° N and 39.243° E.
