= Gölyurt, Gerger =

Village in Adıyaman Province, Turkey

Gölyurt
- Village
- Location within Turkey
- Coordinates: 38.158°N 39.159°E
- Country: Turkey
- Province: Adıyaman
- District: Gerger
- Population (2021): 1,315
- Time zone: UTC+3 (TRT)

Gölyurt (Kurdish: Tillo) is a village in the Gerger District, Adıyaman Province, Turkey. The village is populated by Kurds of the Barmaz tribe and had a population of 1,315 in 2021.

The hamlets of Akçiçek, Ayrancı, Elmalı, Görgülü, Karadut, Kocani, Korucak, Otluca and Sazlık are attached to Gölyurt.
