= Kaşyazı, Gerger =

Village in Adıyaman Province, Turkey

Kaşyazı
- Village
- Location within Turkey
- Coordinates: 38.034°N 39.080°E
- Country: Turkey
- Province: Adıyaman
- District: Gerger
- Population (2021): 402
- Time zone: UTC+3 (TRT)

Kaşyazı (Kurdish: Lagîn) is a village in the Gerger District, Adıyaman Province, Turkey. The village is populated by Kurds of the Çûkan, Ferşatan and Maman tribes and had a population of 402 in 2021.

The hamlets of Arpacık and Döşeme are attached to Kaşyazı.
