= Beybostan, Gerger =

Village in Adıyaman Province, Turkey

Beybostan
- Village
- Location within Turkey
- Coordinates: 37.954°N 39.028°E
- Country: Turkey
- Province: Adıyaman
- District: Gerger
- Population (2021): 171
- Time zone: UTC+3 (TRT)

Beybostan is a village in the Gerger District, Adıyaman Province, Turkey. The village is populated by Turks and had a population of 171 in 2021.
