= Gözpınar, Gerger =

Village in Adıyaman Province, Turkey

Gözpınar
- Village
- Location within Turkey
- Coordinates: 38.057°N 39.160°E
- Country: Turkey
- Province: Adıyaman
- District: Gerger
- Population (2021): 291
- Time zone: UTC+3 (TRT)

Gözpınar (Kurdish: Qesrik) is a village in the Gerger District, Adıyaman Province, Turkey. The village is populated by Kurds of the Çûkan tribe and had a population of 291 in 2021.

The hamlets of Alıçlı, Büzme, Sağlık and Yeşiltaş.
