= Güzelsu, Gerger =

Village in Adıyaman Province, Turkey

Güzelsu
- Village
- Location within Turkey
- Coordinates: 37.877°N 38.918°E
- Country: Turkey
- Province: Adıyaman
- District: Gerger
- Population (2021): 1,109
- Time zone: UTC+3 (TRT)

Güzelsu (Kurdish: Cimik) is a village in the Gerger District, Adıyaman Province, Turkey. The village is populated by Kurds of the Canbeg tribe and had a population of 1,109 in 2021.

The hamlets of Aşazı Güzelsu and Evciler are attached to the village.
