= Grand Mosque of Marash =

Mosque in Kahramanmaraş, Turkey

Maraş Grand Mosque
- Maraş Ulucamii
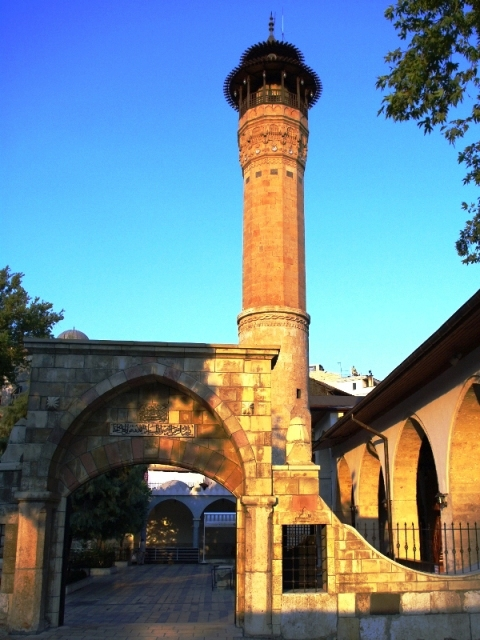

- Location within Turkey

Religion
- Affiliation: Islam
- Branch/tradition: Sunni

Location
- Municipality: Kahramanmaraş City
- State: Kahramanmaraş Province
- Country: Turkey
- Interactive map of Maraş Grand Mosque
- Coordinates: 37°35′05″N 36°55′36″E

Architecture
- Type: mosque

Maraş Grand Mosque (Turkish: Maraş Ulucamii) is a historical mosque in Kahramanmaraş City, Kahramanmaraş Province, Turkey. The mosque is at the south of Kahramanmaraş Castle and to the north west of the covered market. It was built by Suleiman of the Dulkadirids who reigned between 1442 and 1454. In 1501-1502 it was renewed by his son Bozkurt of Dulkadir. The mosque is a wooden-roof mosque. Unlike most other mosques the minaret of the mosque was not built as a part of the mosque. It is in the yard and was decorated with ceramic plates.

== See also ==
- List of Turkish Grand Mosques
