= Oymaklı, Gerger =

Village in Adıyaman Province, Turkey

Oymaklı
- Village
- Location within Turkey
- Coordinates: 37.951°N 39.008°E
- Country: Turkey
- Province: Adıyaman
- District: Gerger
- Population (2021): 343
- Time zone: UTC+3 (TRT)

Oymaklı is a village in the Gerger District, Adıyaman Province, Turkey. The village is populated by Turks and had a population of 343 in 2021.

The hamlets of Başmakçı, İndere, Onbaşılar, Varlık and Yağlıca are attached to Oymaklı.
