= Sittişah Hatun =

Wife of Sultan Mehmed II

Sittişah Mükrime Hatun
- Tîcâni Havâtîni’z-Zamân; Dürretü’l-İhsân; Sitt-i Şâh; Dürretü'l-Muhsenât Havâtîn; Hatun-ı Muazzama
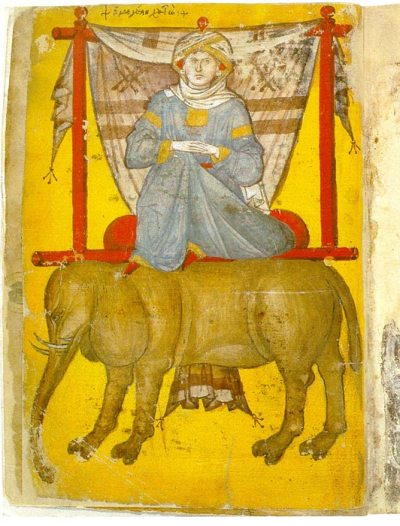
- A 15th century idealized portrait of Sittişah Hatun, painted in Byzantine style. The Greek text above reads ἡ μεγάλη Χατώ, meaning 'the great khatun'
- Born: c. 1430; Elbistan, Beylik of Dulkadir
- Died: September 1486 (aged 55–56); Edirne, Ottoman Empire
- Burial: Sittişah Hatun Mosque, Edirne, Turkey
- Spouse: Mehmed II (m. 1450; died 1481)
- Dynasty: Dulkadirids; Ottoman
- Father: Suleiman Beg
- Religion: Sunni Islam

Sittişah Mükrime Hatun (Ottoman Turkish: ست شاہ خاتون; c. 1430 – September 1486), also known as Sitti Hatun, was a Turkish princess and the legal wife of Mehmed the Conqueror.

== Early life ==
Sittişah Hatun was the daughter of Suleiman Beg, the sixth ruler of Dulkadir State and the niece of Emine Hatun, Ottoman Sultan Mehmed I's wife. She was also the aunt of Ayşe Hatun, the wife of Sultan Bayezid II.

She was born around 1434–1435 in Elbistan.

== Marriage ==
=== Engagement ===
When Mehmed II turned seventeen, his father decided that he should be married to a woman of inferior station for political purposes. The Sultan's choice fell on the wealthy and beautiful daughters of Süleyman Bey, the sixth ruler of Dulkadir State. It must have been in the winter of 1448-1449 that Murad summoned Çandarlı Halil Pasha, his trusted Grand Vizier, and informed him of the marriage plans. The Sultan declared that he wished the prince to marry and this time as he, Murad, saw fit. Halil Pasha approved wholeheartedly of his master's plan, whereupon they decided to choose one of Süleyman's daughters. The wife of Hizir Pasha, Governor of Amasya, was sent to Elbistan to select the bride in accordance with ancient custom. Her choice fell on Sittişah hatun, the most beautiful of the daughters; the intermediary kissed her eyes and put the engagement ring on the finger.

=== Wedding ===
Later the same matron, this time accompanied by Saruca Pasha, the Sultan's favoured adviser in family matters, returned to the court of Elbistan to bring the chosen bride home to Rumelia. The most distinguished nobles of the land escorted the young girl across the mountains to the former Ottoman capital of Bursa, where the judges, the ülema and the sheikhs of the religious orders came to meet her in solemn procession and then onward across the Dardanelles. At the news the cortege was approaching, Murad sent out the grandees of the realm from Edirne to meet his future daughter-in-law, who continued on the Sultan's residence with her imposing retinue.

The wedding took place in the winter of 1450 in Edirne. For the occasion, all subordinate beys, as well as allied rulers from the East and West, were invited, and a grand celebration was held. The festivities gave the young Çelebi Sultan Mehmed an opportunity to witness splendid ceremonies. After the wedding, Sultan Mehmed went with his wife to Manisa, where he would soon receive news of his father's death. Enveri states that the wedding ceremony took place in the winter of 1450–1451 (Düsturname, p. 93), a date which is also given by Doukas, Chalkokondyles, and anonymous Ottoman historians.

About a month later, Sultan Murad II died Mehmed returned to Edirne, where he ascended the throne. Sitti Hatun also returned to Edirne. It is generally believed that Sitti Hatun had no children with Mehmed II. At her request, her husband, Mehmed II had a large palace built for her in Edirne. Although she is known to have visited Istanbul, (Note: Presidency of the State Archives of the Republic of Türkiye, Ottoman Archives, Topkapı Palace Museum Archives Documents (TS.MA.e), 968-3/10160-3, 29 Dhu al-Hijjah 870 AH.) she spent most of her life in her palace. She continued to live in Edirne in her later years and established several charitable foundations.

Sitti Hatun was granted the village of Karbuna as a timar, with a quite high annual revenue of 10,000 akçe. In the cadastral register, she is referred to as “hatun-ı muazzama, daughter of Süleyman Bey". The title “hatun-ı muazzama” was more commonly used for valide sultans, but it is thought to have been used for Sitti Hatun because she was Mehmed II's first wife.

== Death ==
For a long time, Sitti Hatun was believed to have died around 1467 due to an incorrect reading of her tombstone. A re-examination of the tombstone revealed that she actually died in September 1486. The inscription of her mosque, dated to 1483, confirms that she was still alive at that time. Sitti Hatun built a mosque in Edirne bearing her name with the permission and support of her stepson, Sultan Bayezid II. The mosque's inscription describes Sitti Hatun as “the crown of the women of her time and the pearl of beauty” and identifies her as the daughter of Dulkadirid ruler Süleyman Bey.

Sitti Şah Hatun's tomb is located on the qibla side of her mosque and holds a unique distinction for Edirne. She was the first member of the Ottoman dynasty—male or female, including those who died in Edirne—to be buried in the city. She also represents another “first” there are two official portraits of her, one showing her in a palanquin and the other with her brother.

== Sources ==
- Babinger, Franz (1992). Mehmed the Conqueror and His Time. Princeton University Press. ISBN 978-0-691-01078-6.
- Sakaoğlu, Necdet (2008). Bu mülkün kadın sultanları: Vâlide sultanlar, hâtunlar, hasekiler, kadınefendiler, sultanefendiler. Oğlak Yayıncılık. ISBN 978-9-753-29623-6.
- Uluçay, Mustafa Çağatay (2011). Padişahların kadınları ve kızları. Ankara: Ötüken. ISBN 978-9-754-37840-5.
