= Gönen, Gerger =

Village in Adıyaman Province, Turkey

Gönen
- Village
- Location within Turkey
- Coordinates: 38.037°N 39.123°E
- Country: Turkey
- Province: Adıyaman
- District: Gerger
- Population (2021): 156
- Time zone: UTC+3 (TRT)

Gönen (Kurdish: Heylim) is a village in the Gerger District, Adıyaman Province, Turkey. The village is populated by Kurds of the Çûkan and Mukrîyanî tribes and had a population of 156 in 2021.

The hamlets of Ballıca and Yumurtalık are attached to the village.
