= Güngörmüş, Gerger =

Village in Adıyaman Province, Turkey

Güngörmüş
- Village
- Location within Turkey
- Coordinates: 37.9853°N 38.8492°E
- Country: Turkey
- Province: Adıyaman
- District: Gerger
- Population (2021): 186
- Time zone: UTC+3 (TRT)

Güngörmüş (Kurdish: Petirge) is a village in the Gerger District, Adıyaman Province, Turkey. The village is populated by Kurds of the Mirdêsan tribe and had a population of 186 in 2021.

The hamlets of Ören and Yaylacık are attached to the village.
