= Beşgöze, Gerger =

Village in Adıyaman Province, Turkey

Beşgöze
- Village
- Location within Turkey
- Coordinates: 37.870°N 38.960°E
- Country: Turkey
- Province: Adıyaman
- District: Gerger
- Population (2021): 391
- Time zone: UTC+3 (TRT)

Beşgöze (Kurdish: Kortîyan) is a village in the Gerger District, Adıyaman Province, Turkey. The village is populated by Kurds of the Canbeg tribe and had a population of 391 in 2021.

The hamlets of Çıkrıklı, Tepecik and Yoliçi are attached to the village.
