= Dağdeviren, Gerger =

Village in Adıyaman Province, Turkey

Dağdeviren
- Village
- Location within Turkey
- Coordinates: 38.010°N 38.972°E
- Country: Turkey
- Province: Adıyaman
- District: Gerger
- Population (2021): 331
- Time zone: UTC+3 (TRT)

Dağdeviren (Kurdish: Daxdewiren) is a village in the Gerger District, Adıyaman Province, Turkey. The village is populated by Kurds of the Culûr tribe and had a population of 331 in 2021.

The hamlets of Akyürek, Gelincik, Hasanhamza, Örtülü and Yapraklı are attached to the village.
