= TCG Kılıç Ali Paşa =

Two ships of the Turkish Navy have been named TCG Kılıç Ali Paşa for Kılıç Ali Paşa:

- TCG Kılıç Ali Paşa (D-350) was a Royal Navy M-class destroyer launched in 1941 as HMS Matchless (G52). She was sold to the Turkish Navy in 1959 and renamed Kılıç Ali Paşa, and decommissioned in 1970.
- TCG Kılıç Ali Paşa (D-349) was a United States Navy Gearing-class destroyer launched in 1945 as USS Robert H. McCard (DD-822). She was sold to the Turkish Navy in 1980 and renamed Kılıç Ali Paşa, and decommissioned on 29 September 1998.

== See also ==
- Kılıç Ali Pasha Complex
