= Memet Kiliç =

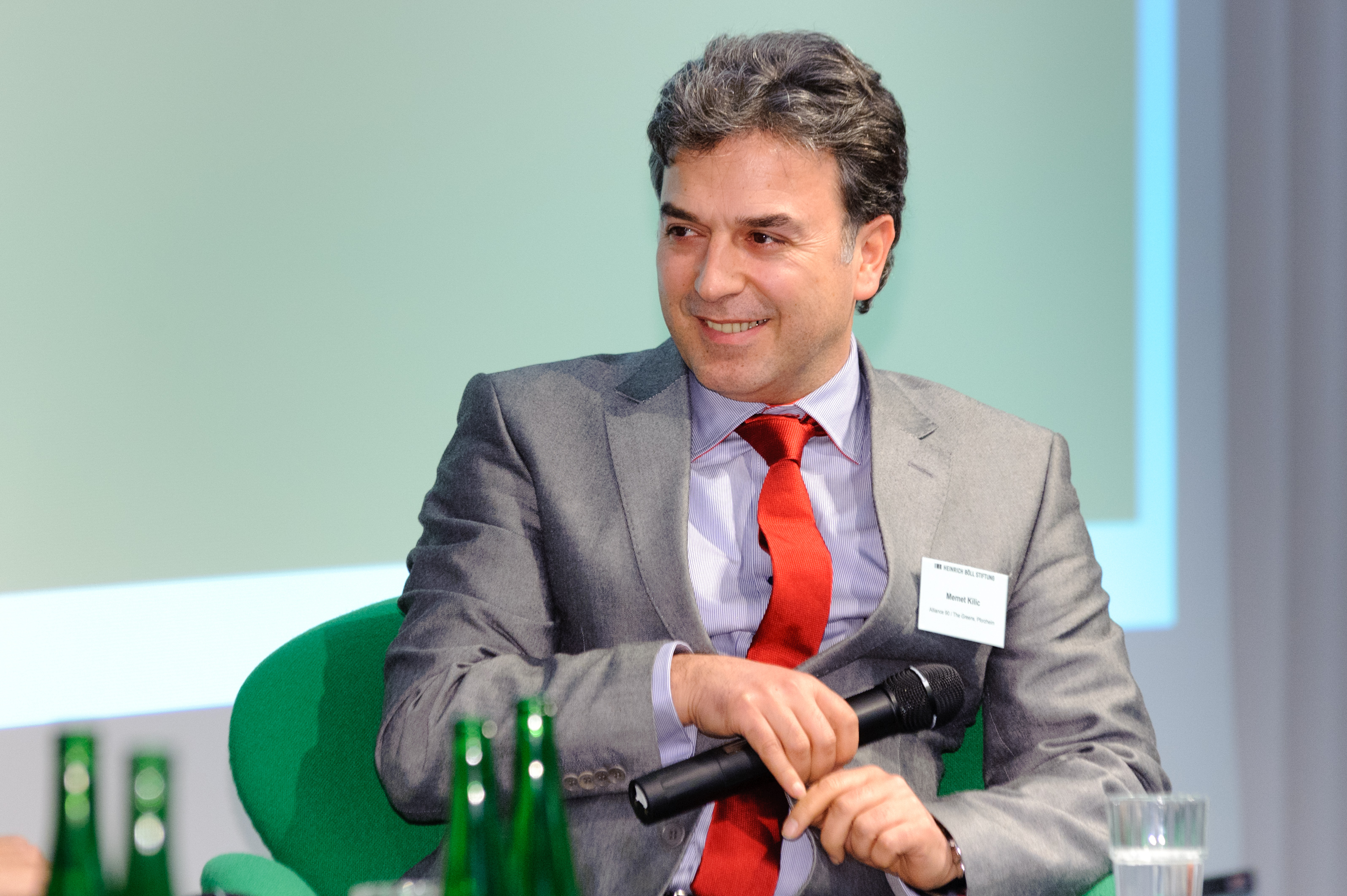
Memet Kılıç (2011)

Memet Kiliç, also Memet Kılıç (born 24 January 1967 in Malatya, Turkey), is a German lawyer and politician (Alliance 90/The Greens). From 2009 to 2013, he was a member of the German Bundestag.

== Activities ==
Until 2023, Kılıç worked at a Heidelberg law firm specializing in international private law, European law, and immigration law. He is a member of the bar associations in Karlsruhe and Ankara. He received his legal training at Ankara University and Heidelberg University, where he also earned a Master of Laws degree.

From 2004 to 2009, he represented the Green Party on the Heidelberg City Council. Kılıç is a member of the German-Turkish Lawyers' Association and the Council of Europe's Committee of Experts on Migration. He served on the Broadcasting Council of Südwestrundfunk (SWR) from 1998 to 2008 and on the advisory board for Leadership Development of the German Armed Forces from 2000 to 2009. In addition to legal articles, Kılıç also published numerous political essays and articles in various regional and national media outlets.

Memet Kılıç ran as a citizen with German and Turkish nationality in both the federal election 2005 and the federal election 2009 in the constituency Pforzheim for Alliance 90/The Greens. In 2009 he was elected to the Bundestag via the state list Baden-Württemberg. He was a member of the Internal Affairs Committee and the Petitions Committee. He was not re-elected in the 2013 federal election. He is running for office in the Rhein-Neckar constituency in the 2017 federal election.

== Positions ==
Kılıç is Alevi.

In March 2010, Kılıç declined an invitation from Turkish Prime Minister Recep Tayyip Erdoğan to a Turkish government event in Istanbul. The event was intended to encourage politicians of Turkish origin in Germany to become more politically active in representing the interests of the Republic of Turkey. He explained his refusal by saying: “I didn’t see the context of the event. It was a meeting of Turkish representatives, and I see myself primarily as a member of the German Bundestag. So I didn’t fit in.”

In February 2012, Kılıç expressed his disapproval of the upcoming election of Joachim Gauck to the office of Federal President of Germany. He stated that Gauck had destroyed trust with his praise of Thilo Sarrazin. “We need genuine debates about integration, not populist ones,” he stated in the Frankfurter Rundschau.

In June 2012, Kılıç called the ruling of the Cologne Regional Court in an individual case concerning the criminalization of medically unnecessary circumcisions of boys for religious reasons “food for thought, which is certainly appropriate for the judiciary in a secular state,” and appealed to religious communities to participate in the societal discussion about whether it would be sensible to postpone circumcisions until boys reach religious maturity. With regard to his own sons, he stated that it might be better if they were allowed to decide for themselves in later years whether or not they wanted to bear the mark of the Muslim faith. The Petitions Committee of the German Bundestag was debating whether horses should be branded or whether there were less restrictive alternatives. Therefore, the question of circumcising young boys should not be taboo. Kılıç rejected criticism from religious quarters that a legal ban on circumcision would make Jewish or Muslim life in Germany impossible in the future. He called this a "big stick" intended to stifle the debate on the permissibility of circumcision. Kılıç supported a cross-party bill (17/11430) introduced by a group of over 50 members of the Bundestag on 8 November 2012.

In response to the 2013 protests in Turkey, Kılıç, together with Cem Özdemir and other Green Party politicians, called on Turkish Prime Minister Recep Tayyip Erdoğan in an open letter to end the violence and allow freedom of expression in Turkey. "This senseless violence against people peacefully exercising their civil rights must end. The elected government of a democratic country striving to join the European Union should not see things differently, and certainly not shrug off violence against its citizens or even instigate it."

A trial against Memet Kılıç began in mid-December 2019 for “insulting the President” and a warrant for his arrest was issued by a judge in Ankara. Erdogan's lawyers are demanding his arrest in Germany. In its indictment, the Public Prosecutor's Office describes several statements made by Kılıç in a July 2017 interview with the Turkish online newspaper “ABC Gazatesi” as “insulting” to the Turkish head of state. In the interview, Kılıç had said, among other things: “The damage that Erdogan has inflicted on Turkey is intolerable.” And: “As a politician with Turkish roots, I am very saddened that my country has been brought to this point and I call those who brought it to this point traitors to the fatherland.”

== Publications (Selection) ==
=== Legal Textbook Contributions ===
- Marriage Law in Europe. Edited by Süß/Ring, Zerb Verlag and Nomos Verlag, 2006, ISBN 3-935079-30-3; Nomos, ISBN 3-8329-1419-6.
- Inheritance Law in Europe, edited by Süß/Haas, Zerb Verlag and Nomos Verlag, 2004, ISBN 3-935079-10-9.
- Effects of the German Citizenship Reform. Edited by the German-Turkish Lawyers Association. V., Berlin 2002, pp. 33–47. (Berlin Verlag, ISBN 3-8305-0305-9).
- "Tourists or Migrants." In: "New Government – New Immigration Policy?" Edited by Barwig/Brinkmann/Heilbronner/Huber/Kreuzer/Lörcher/Schuchmacher, Nomos Verlag, 1999, pp. 33–46.
- "The Customs Union between the European Community and Turkey." (Master's thesis), published by T.C. Basbakanlik Hazine ve Disticaret Müstesarligi, Ankara 1993.

=== Legal journal articles ===
- Alman Avukatlik Kanunu´nun Bazi Hükümlerine Kisa Bir Bakis. In: Çagdas Hukuk (Magazine of “Çagdas Hukukçular Dernegi”) v. 5–6/1993, p. 36 ff.
- Türk Aile Hukukunda Yapilan Reform, Kadin-Erkek Esitligine Giden Yolu Açiyor. In: Çagdas Hukuk (Magazine of “Çagdas Hukukçular Dernegi”) v. 7–8/1993, pp. 45 ff.
- "The Reform in Turkish Family Law Paves the Way to Equal Rights" in: "FamRZ" 11/1993, pp. 1282 ff.
- "German-Turkish Dual Citizenship?" In: "StAZ." 3/1994, pp. 73 ff.
- "Recognition and Enforcement of Foreign Divorce Decrees by Turkish Courts." In: "IPRax", 6/1994, pp. 477 ff.
- "Legal Issues of German-Turkish Dual Citizenship." In: "Journal for Turkish Studies (ZfTS)." 1/1994, pp. 59 ff.
- "The Classification of the Search of a law firm from the perspective of Article 8 of the European Convention on Human Rights. In: Journal of the Manisa Bar Association. 1/1996, pp. 15 ff.
- The voting rights of Turks living abroad. In: Journal for Turkish Studies (ZfTS). 2/1996, pp. 207 ff.
- Migrants: Unwelcome (The Aliens Act does not reflect reality). In: Intercultural Society and Citizenship. Ed.: Heinrich Böll Foundation, Berlin 2002, pp. 15 f. (with contributions by Rita Süssmuth, Dieter Oberndörfer, Barbara John, and Memet Kılıç).
- "New Immigration Law – New Grounds for Asylum?" In: "nah&fern" (A Resource and Information Service for Ecumenical Work with Foreigners), 28 February 2003, pp. 28–31.
- "Responsibility of Public Broadcasting Corporations in the Integration of Migrants." In: "Journal for Media and Communications Law" (AfP), 1–2003.
