= Gürgenli, Gerger =

Village in Adıyaman Province, Turkey

Gürgenli
- Village
- Location within Turkey
- Coordinates: 37.9793°N 38.8348°E
- Country: Turkey
- Province: Adıyaman
- District: Gerger
- Population (2021): 515
- Time zone: UTC+3 (TRT)

Gürgenli (Kurdish: Pêşwal) is a village in the Gerger District, Adıyaman Province, Turkey. The village is populated by Kurds of the Mirdêsan tribe and had a population of 515 in 2021.

The hamlets of Akmeşe, Mezraa, Özveren and Sarıtarla are attached to Gürgenli.
