= Ağaçlı, Gerger =

Village in Adıyaman Province, Turkey

Ağaçlı
- Village
- Location within Turkey
- Coordinates: 38.031°N 38.898°E
- Country: Turkey
- Province: Adıyaman
- District: Gerger
- Population (2021): 351
- Time zone: UTC+3 (TRT)

Ağaçlı (Kurdish: Şevikan) is a village in the Gerger District, Adıyaman Province, Turkey. The village is populated by Kurds of Dirêjan tribe and had a population of 351 in 2021.
