= Kılıç, Gerger =

Village in Adıyaman Province, Turkey

Kılıç
- Village
- Location within Turkey
- Coordinates: 37.851°N 38.950°E
- Country: Turkey
- Province: Adıyaman
- District: Gerger
- Population (2021): 438
- Time zone: UTC+3 (TRT)

Kılıç (Kurdish: Pîyango) is a village in the Gerger District, Adıyaman Province, Turkey. The village is populated by Kurds of the Canbeg tribe and had a population of 438 in 2021.

The hamlets of Doğancı, Kabaağaç, Mutlu and Yeni Kalecik are attached to the village.
