= Gerger =

- Municipality
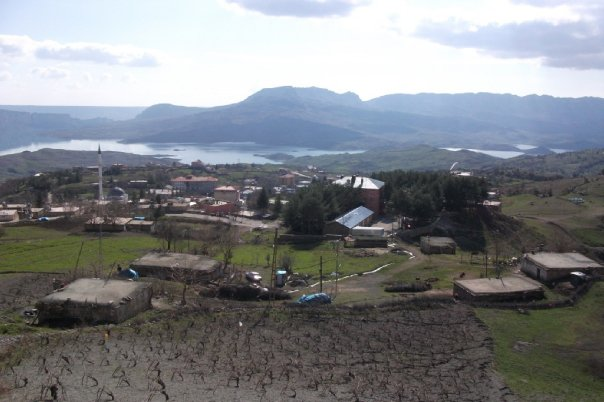
- Gerger

- Location within Turkey
- Coordinates: 38°01′44″N 39°01′56″E
- Country: Turkey
- Province: Adıyaman
- District: Gerger

Government
  - Mayor: Erkan Aksoy (AKP)
- Population (2021): 2,753
- Time zone: UTC+3 (TRT)
- Postal code: 02700
- Website: www.gerger.bel.tr

Gerger (Armenian: Գարգար, romanized: Gargar, lit. 'mound'; Kurdish: Aldûş) is a town of Adıyaman Province of Turkey. It is the seat of Gerger District. It is populated by Kurds of different tribal backgrounds and had a population of 2,753 in 2021. The mayor is Erkan Aksoy (AKP).

== History ==
=== Medieval History ===
In the 11th century the town formed a defensive outpost for the Byzantine Empire together with the city of Edessa, Samosata, Ḥiṣn Manṣūr and Chasanara and seems to have had a considerable garrison. After Byzantine rule over the region faded, the region around the Mor Bar Sauma monastery and Gerger became a base of power for local chiefs of Syriac and Armenian origin, and the town was under control of Constantine of Gerger. The Seljuks pillaged Gerger and neighbouring Siverek, and when Belek Ghazi captured the town in 1122, he expelled most of its Christian population. He returned the following year to burn Gerger and enslave its remaining citizens.

=== Modern History ===
According to The Geographical Journal in 1896, Gerger had 750 inhabitants with most being Kurds, with the exception of few Ottoman officials and Armenians.

=== Archaeology ===
In 2018, archaeologists discovered a cave which used during religious ceremonies by Christians during the Byzantine period. Cross figures found inside the cave.

== Sources ==
- Beihammer, Alexander Daniel (2017). Byzantium and the Emergence of Muslim Turkish Anatolia, ca. 1040-1130. Routledge. ISBN 978-1-138-22959-4.
