= Ahmet Kaya =

Kurdish-Turkish folk singer (1957–2000)

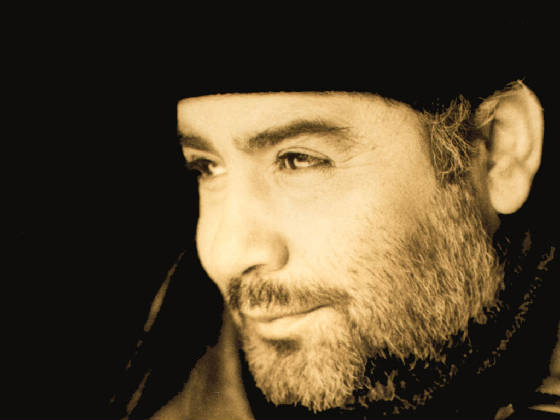
- Dosta Düşmana Karşı album cover photo, 1998

Background information
- Born: 28 October 1957; Malatya Province, Turkey
- Died: 16 November 2000 (aged 43) Paris, France
- Genres: Turkish folk music, Kurdish folk music, Azerbaijani folk music, Protest song
- Occupations: Musician, Composer, Poet
- Instruments: Bağlama, vocals
- Years active: 1984–2000
- Labels: Taç Plak (1984–1987, 1989, 1990), Barış Müzik (1989, 1990–1991), Tempa - Foneks (1992), Raks Müzik (1993–1998), Gam Müzik (1998–2000)
- Website: www.ahmetkaya.com

Ahmet Kaya (28 October 1957 – 16 November 2000) was a Turkish Kurd folk music artist. Kaya was persecuted by Turkish nationalist celebrities and authorities. Kaya left Turkey in an act of self-exile, and moved to France, where he would shortly after die of a heart attack.

He was granted the Musician of the Year Award in February 1999 during a controversial award ceremony involving Turkey's most popular singers, at which he declared that he wanted to sing a song in Kurdish.

== Early life and education ==
Ahmet Kaya, He was born in Malatya as the youngest of a family of 5 children. His mother of Turkish origin is from Erzurum, and his father of Kurdish origin is from Yağızatlı village in Çelikhan district of Adıyaman province. His father worked at the local textiles factory and the family lived in only one room until in 1959, which was the year the factory began to provide better accommodation to its workers. Ahmet often visited his relatives in the country side where he made his first experiences with music. His uncle Yusuf was a singer and a musician, who inspired him to build his own bağlama. His musical career was also influenced by his father, who bought him a real bağlama, after he had seen Ahmet giving "concerts" to the families chickens with his self-made one. From that moment on, still at a young age, he held concerts for the fellow workers of his father and his first official concert was in July 1966 at the age of nine. His life circled around music, and he toured the region giving concerts and in later years took up a job at a record store where worked after school. By 1977 the family had settled to Istanbul, where he and his father received employment at a phone company which was owned by Malatyans. He served in the Turkish army as a musician in the Army orchestra in Gelibolu and after he married in 1979 he and his wife settled into an apartment in Sarıyer, Istanbul. After the military coup in 1980, his environment became dire as several of his colleagues were arrested and sent to prison. He and his wife divorced in 1981.

== Musical career ==
He played as a musician in the band of Ferdi Tayfur, through which he got to know the organized crime leader "Kürt Idris" (Özbir). In a moment when he was giving the son of Kürt Idris Bağlama classes, he was arrested due to a gun which was found in the office of the mafia boss. After his release from prison three months later, he staged concerts with Hüseyin Demirel, and the two soon approached the record label who was to produce their music. The musical relationship with Demirel terminated in tatters as the success did not follow the release of their first album, but Ahmet married his second wife Gülten Hayaloğlu, whom he got to know through Selda Bağcan, a well-known Turkish left-wing musician. Following the improvement of his financial situation thanks to the success of his fourth album released in 1986, he and his wife moved to the Beyoğlu neighborhood in a house close to the Galatasaray High school. With the success and a close musical relationship with Yusuf, his brother-in-law, and author of several of his songs his life became more organized and he became a father for a second time. Following his move to larger apartment in the fancy neighborhood in Valideçeşme, he was the target of criticism from parts within the left-wing movement who had brought him to this stage of his life. Still, due to the left-wing political aspect of his songs, he came to the attention of the Turkish Government. Following public statements regarding his lifestyle by his brother-in-law Yusuf, they parted ways. His financial situation and his political statements were still an issue for the left-wing movement as well as for the Turkish authorities, who in 1992 also briefly confiscated a Mercedes Benz of his, to which he responded that he could ride on a donkey as well if the Government wanted it. In 1994 he released his best known album so far, Şarkılarım Dağlara, which included songs focusing of the Kurdish-Turkish conflict between the Kurdistan Workers' Party (PKK) and the Turkish army raging in Turkish Kurdistan. In 1990s he and his wife established the GAK label, but even though they signed well known musicians the project was not crowned with a lasting success.

== Awards ceremony incident ==
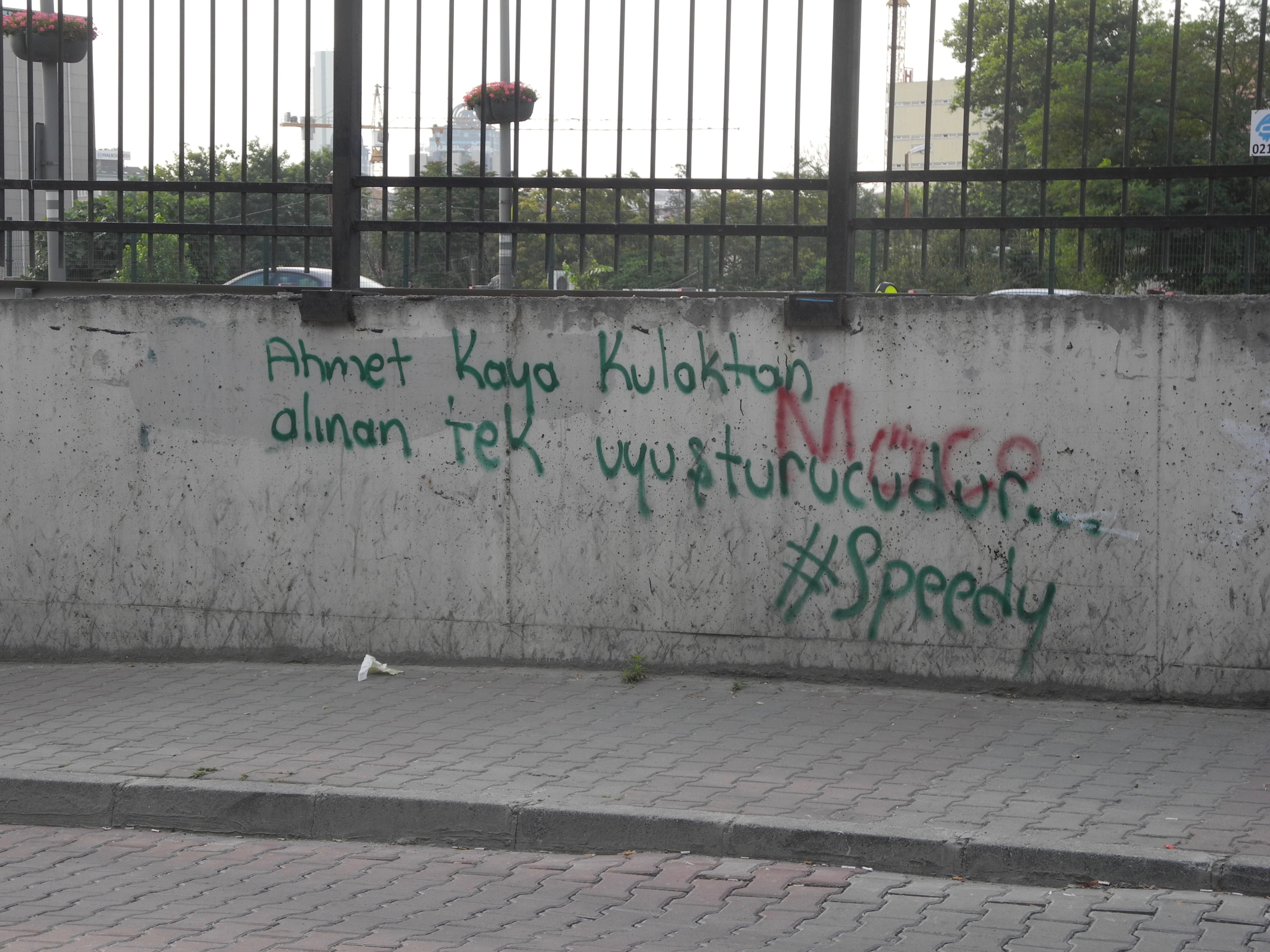
An homage in graffiti to the power of Ahmet Kaya's voice in Okmeydanı, Istanbul: "The only drug taken through the ear is Ahmet Kaya."

On 11 February 1999 during the televised annual music awards ceremony at which he was to be named Musician of the Year, Kaya said that he wanted to produce music in his native language, as he was of Kurdish background. He also announced that he had recorded a song in Kurdish (Karwan, released on the Hoşçakalın Gözüm album in 2001) and intended to produce a video to accompany it.

Following this announcement, he faced massive opposition from Turkish people and celebrities in the event. First, Serdar Ortaç started singing a song with modified lyrics to boost nationalist feelings, then people in the ceremony started singing 10th Year March. Later, Kaya was attacked by celebrities. Kaya's wife describes the attack as "All of a sudden, all of those chic women and men, they all turned into monsters, grabbing forks and knives and throwing them at us, insulting, booing. Imagine the atmosphere changing in just five minutes, almost a Kafkaesque transformation."

== Exile and death ==
The incident led to a prosecution case which made him leave Turkey. In March 2000 he was sentenced in absentia to three years and nine months in prison on the charge of spreading separatist propaganda. Later, however, the mass media allegation showing Kaya in front of the poster was proven to be forged. He died from a heart attack in Paris in 2000, at the age of 43, and is buried in Père Lachaise Cemetery. He is buried in item number 71.

=== Vandalism of grave ===
In November 2021, visitors of his grave found it to be recently attacked by unknown perpetrator(s).

== Discography ==
- Ağlama Bebeğim (1985)
- Acılara Tutunmak (1985)
- Şafak Türküsü (1986)
- An Gelir (1986)
- Yorgun Demokrat (1987)
- Başkaldırıyorum (1988)
- Resitaller-1 (1989)
- İyimser Bir Gül – Kod Adı Bahtiyar (1989)
- Resitaller-2 (1990)
- Sevgi Duvarı (1990)
- Başım Belada (1991)
- Dokunma Yanarsın (1992)
- Tedirgin (1993)
- Şarkılarım Dağlara (1994)
- Beni Bul (1995)
- Yıldızlar ve Yakamoz (1996)
- Dosta Düşmana Karşı (1998)

Posthumous:

- Hoşçakalın Gözüm (2001)
- Biraz da Sen Ağla (2003)
- Kalsın Benim Davam (2005)
- Gözlerim Bin Yaşında (2006)

== Posthumous awards ==
In June 2012 the Turkish Association of Magazine Journalists awarded Ahmet Kaya its Special Prize.

In October 2013 Ahmet Kaya was given the Grand Presidential Prize in Culture and Arts in the music category on the day that would have been his 57th birthday.
