= Yeşilova, Çelikhan =

Village in Adıyaman Province, Turkey

Yeşilova
- Village
- Location within Turkey
- Coordinates: 37.961°N 38.392°E
- Country: Turkey
- Province: Adıyaman
- District: Çelikhan
- Population (2021): 132
- Time zone: UTC+3 (TRT)

Yeşilova is a village in the Çelikhan District of Adıyaman Province in Turkey. The village is populated by Kurds of the Reşwan tribe and had a population of 132 in 2021.

It was a hamlet of Yeşiltepe until 2016.
