= Mutlu =

Mutlu, meaning "happy", is a Turkish given name and surname and may refer to:

== People ==
=== Given name ===
- Mutlu Dervişoğlu (born 1977), Turkish footballer
- Mutlu Onaral, American singer of Turkish descent
- Mutlu Topçu (born 1970), Turkish footballer

=== Surname ===
- Ayten Mutlu (born 1952), Turkish poet
- Halil Mutlu (born 1973), Turkish weightlifter
- Hüseyin Avni Mutlu (born 1956), Turkish civil servant and Governor of Istanbul
- Mert Mutlu (born 1974), Turkish cyclist and coach
- Onur Mutlu (born 1978), Turkish computer scientist
- Özcan Mutlu (born 1968), Turkish-German Green Party politician
- Semiha Mutlu (born 1987), Turkish racewalker

== Places ==
- Mutlu, Babaeski, a village in Kırklareli Province
- Mutlu, Bayburt, a village in Bayburt Province
- Mutlu, Çelikhan, a village in Adıyaman Province
- Mutlu, Çubuk, a neighbourhood in Ankara Province
