= Karaçayır =

Karaçayır may refer to:

- Karaçayır, Aksaray, village in Aksaray Province, Turkey
- Karaçayır, Çelikhan, village in Adıyaman Province, Turkey
