= İncirli, Çelikhan =

Village in Adıyaman Province, Turkey

İncirli
- Village
- Location within Turkey
- Coordinates: 38.011°N 38.404°E
- Country: Turkey
- Province: Adıyaman
- District: Çelikhan
- Population (2021): 96
- Time zone: UTC+3 (TRT)

İncirli (Kurdish: Încîrlî) is a village in the Çelikhan District of Adıyaman Province in Turkey. It is populated by Kurds of the Reşwan tribe and had a population of 96 in 2021.

It was a hamlet of Yağızatlı until 2015.
