= Altıntaş, Çelikhan =

Village in Adıyaman Province, Turkey

Altıntaş
- Village
- Location within Turkey
- Coordinates: 38.115°N 38.266°E
- Country: Turkey
- Province: Adıyaman
- District: Çelikhan
- Population (2021): 35
- Time zone: UTC+3 (TRT)

Altıntaş (Kurdish: Dîregî) is a village in the Çelikhan District, Adıyaman Province, Turkey. The village is populated by Kurds of the Reşwan tribe and had a population of 35 in 2021.
