= Karagöl, Çelikhan =

Village in Adıyaman Province, Turkey

Karagöl
- Village
- Location within Turkey
- Coordinates: 38.078°N 38.415°E
- Country: Turkey
- Province: Adıyaman
- District: Çelikhan
- Population (2021): 83
- Time zone: UTC+3 (TRT)

Karagöl (Kurdish: Golreş) is a village in the Çelikhan District, Adıyaman Province, Turkey. It is populated by Kurds of the Reşwan tribe and had a population of 83 in 2021.
