= Notre-Dame-du-Perpetuel-Secours, Paris =

Basilica of Notre-Dame-du-Perpetuel-Secours
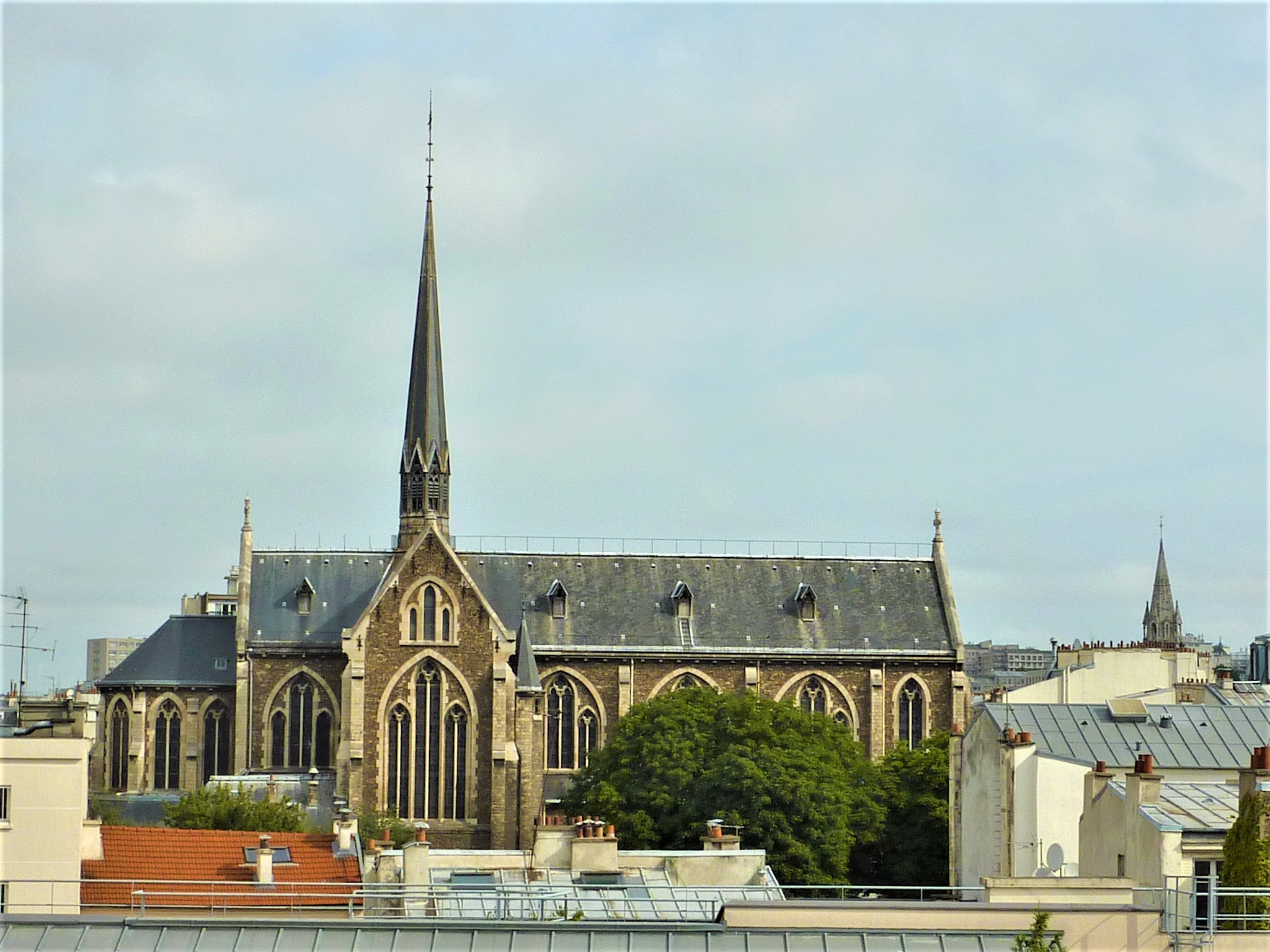
- Basilica of Notre-Dame-du-Perpetuel-Secours
- 48.8618°N 2.3870°E
- Location: 55 Boulevard de Menilmontant, 11th arrondissement of Paris
- Country: France
- Denomination: Roman Catholic

Architecture
- Style: Neo-Gothic
- Completed: 1896

Administration
- Archdiocese: Paris

Notre-Dame-du-Perpetuel-Secours ("Our Lady of Perpetual Care") is a minor basilica of the Roman Catholic Church located at 85 boulevard de Menilmontant in the 11th arrondissement of Paris. The present church, in the neo-Gothic style, was completed in 1896 and was raised to the level of a minor basilica in 1966 by Pope Paul VI. The parish of the church includes the Pere-Lachaise cemetery.

== History ==
As the population of east Paris grew rapidly in the second half of the 19th century, particularly during the reign of Napoleon III, new and larger churches were needed. In the place of an earlier chapel dedicated to Saint Hippolyte in 1872, a larger new church was built between 1892 and 1896. It was dedicated to the Redemptorists, who preached particularly to the working class. The new church followed the plans of an architect-cleric member of the church, Brother Gerard.

In 1960 the Redemptorist movement quit the church, and it became a regular parish church.

== Exterior ==
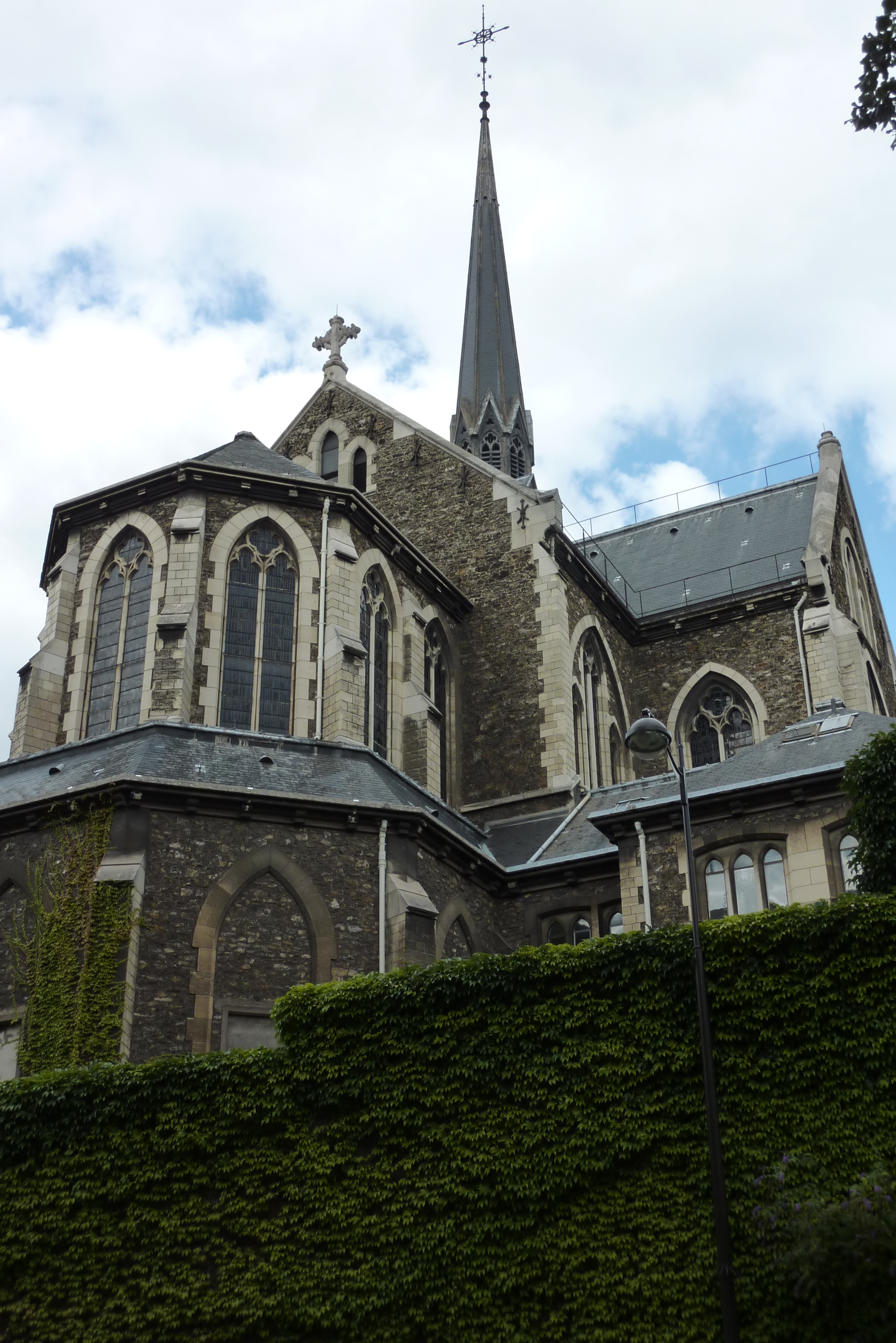
The chevet and apse chapel

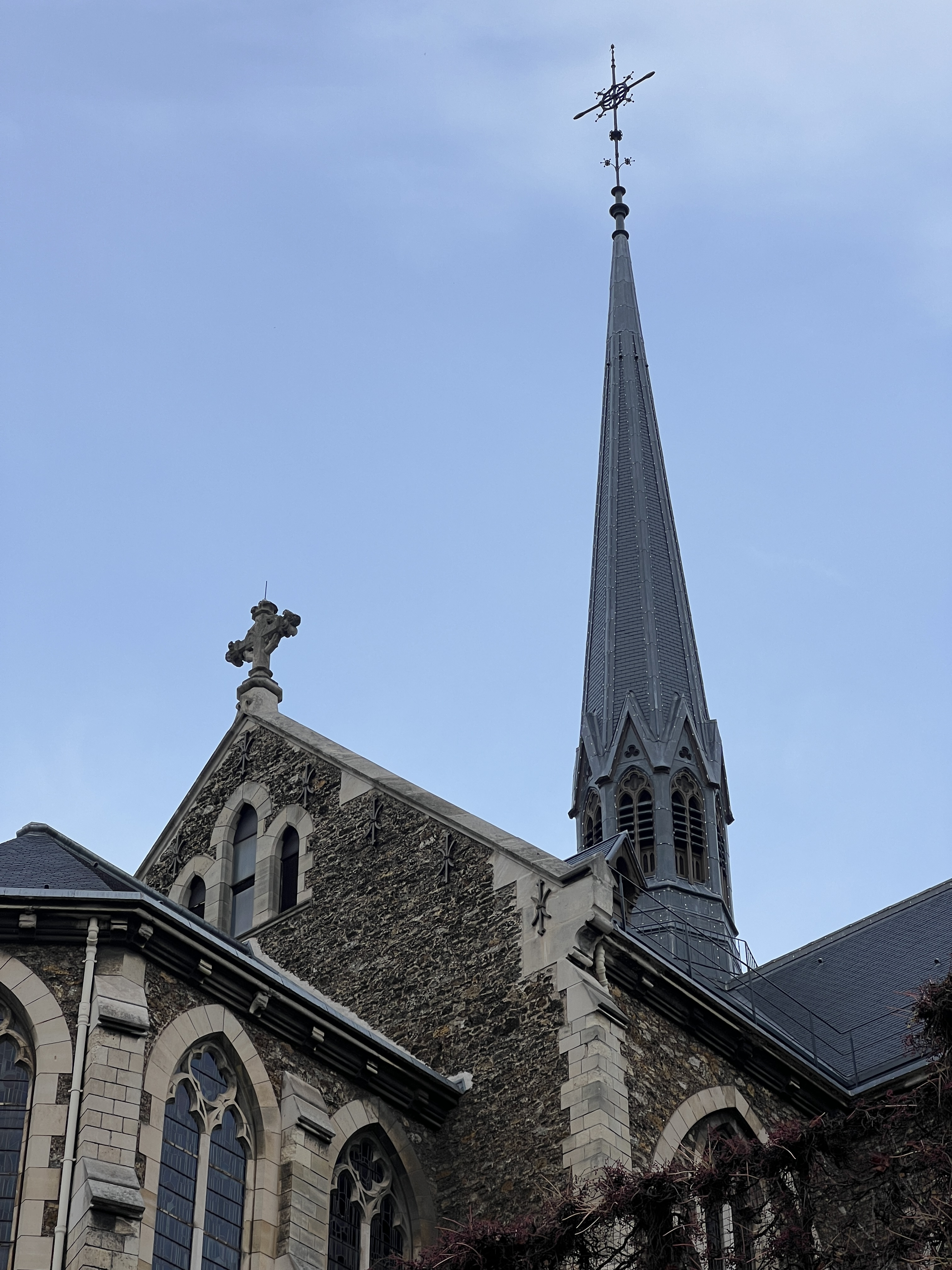
The spire

== Interior ==
The interior combines traditional Gothic elements, such as the sculoture of the capital columns, with some modern elements, such as the stained glass windows.

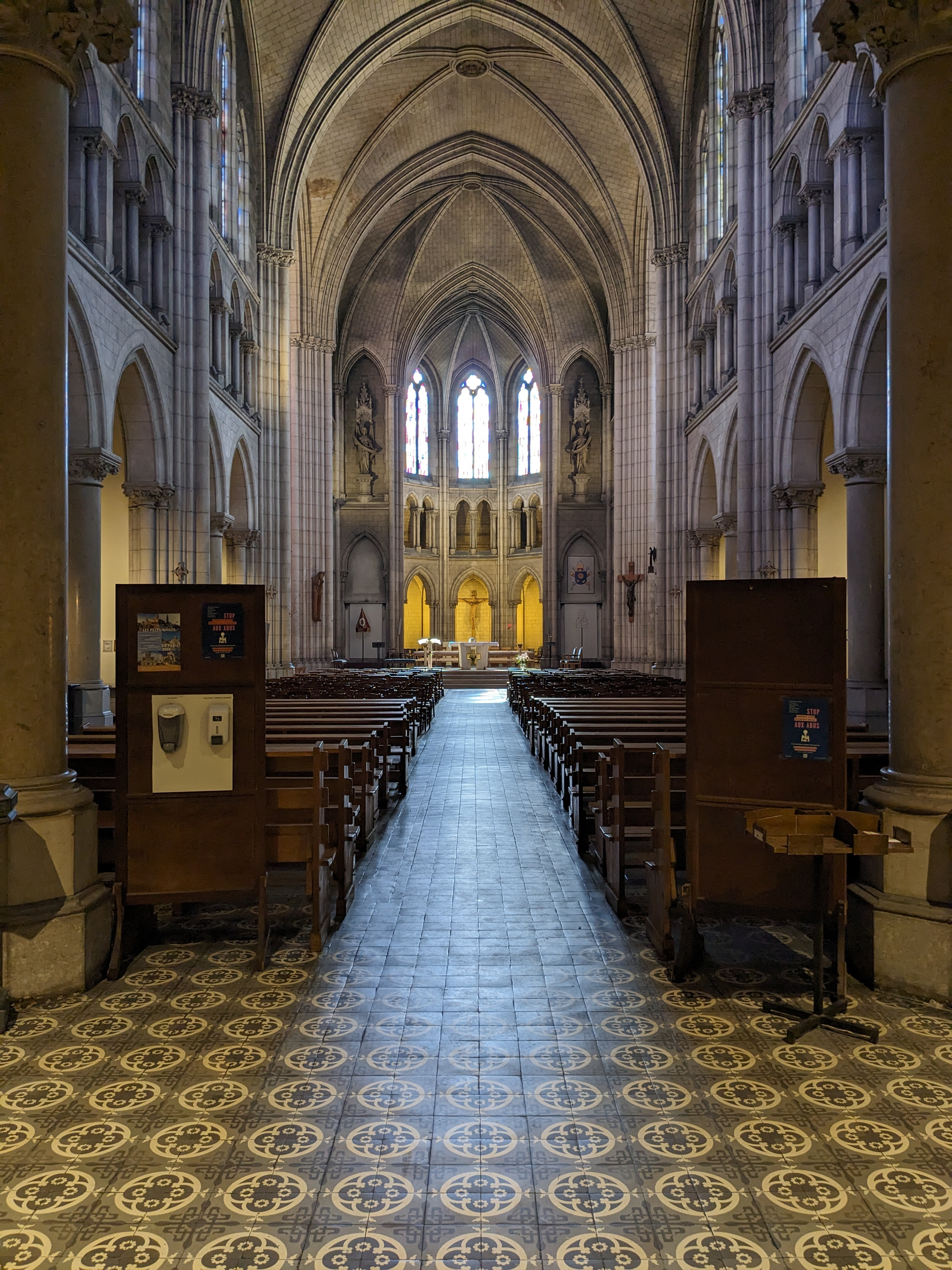
Nave seen from the portal

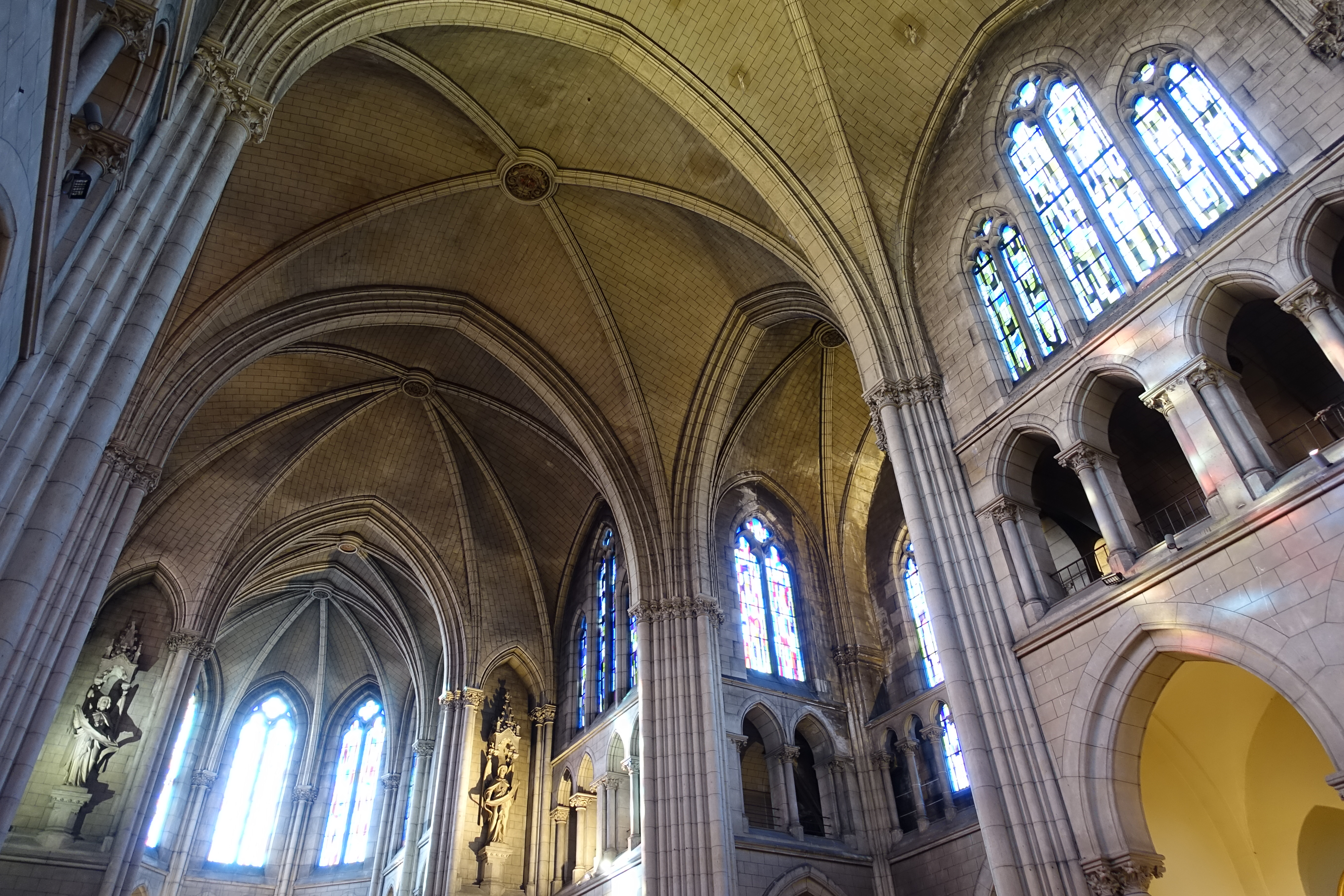
Upper level over the choir

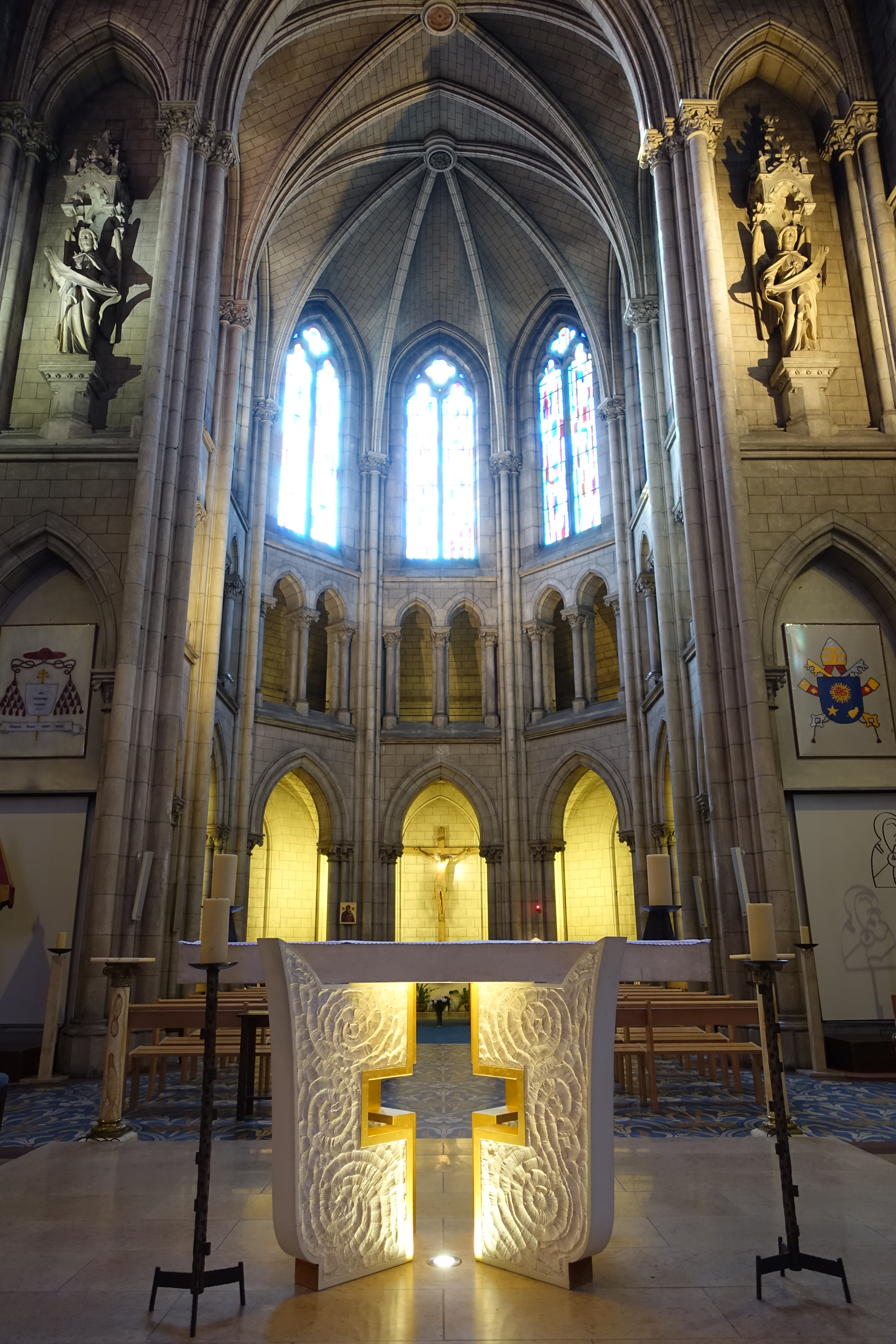
The Choir

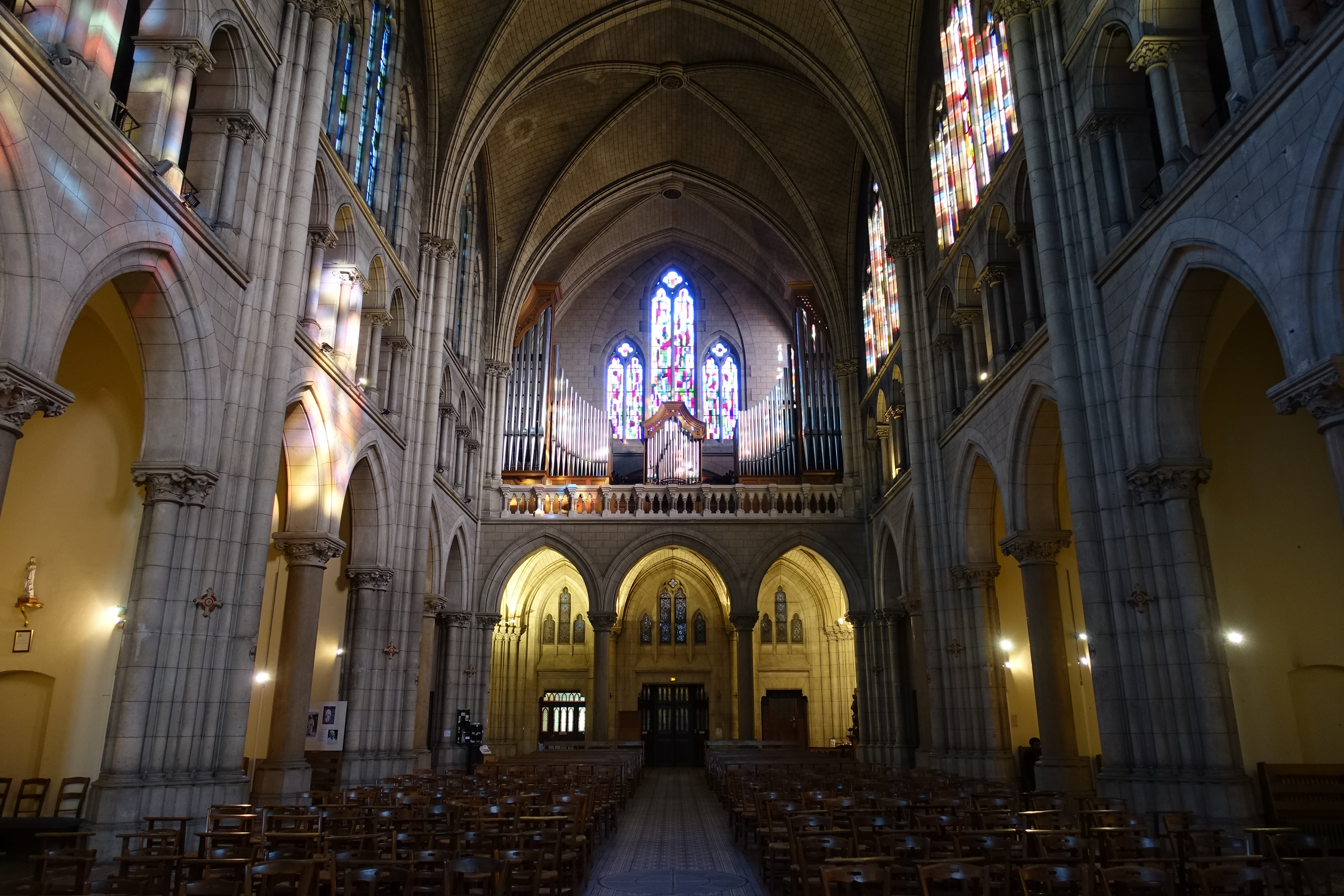
The nave with the organ in the tribune

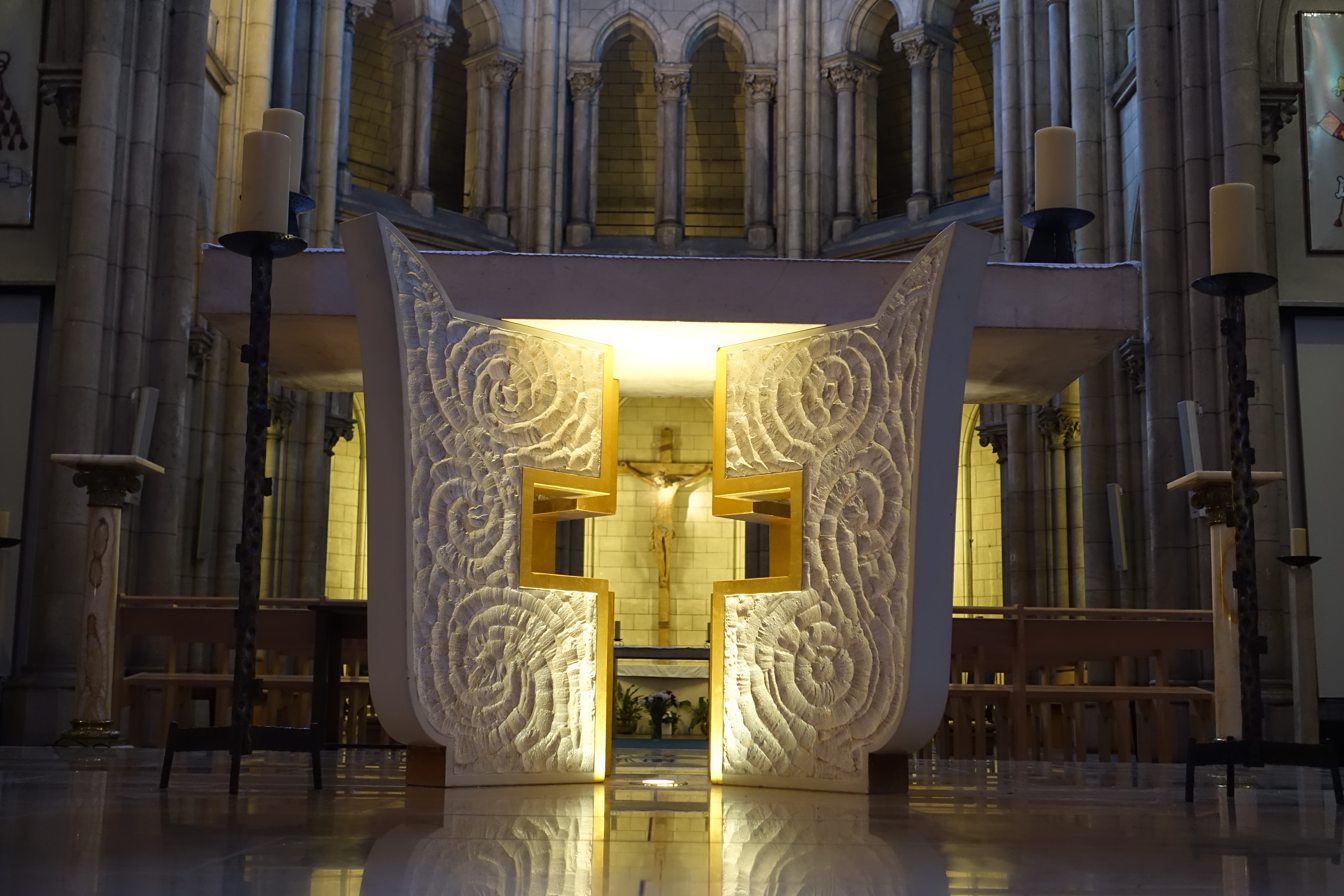
Altar

=== Art and decoration ===
The present stained glass is more recent. It was put in place in 1974 by the master glassmaker Marcelle Lacamp (1910-2000), in collaboraation with another artist,m Marguerite Huré. They are an example of the development of abstract windows in religious art the 20th century.

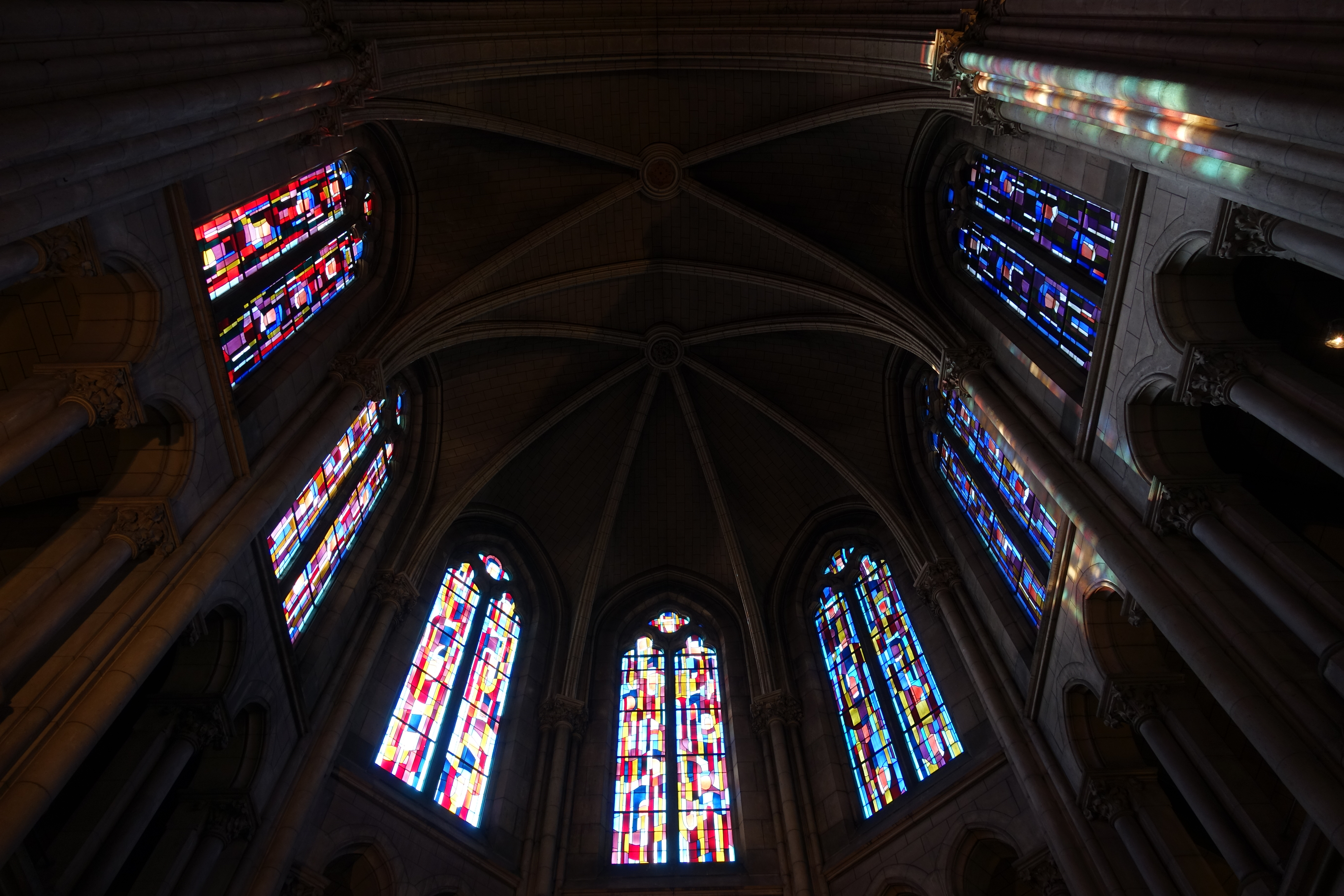
Windows in the choir by Marcelle Lacamp and Marguerite Huré

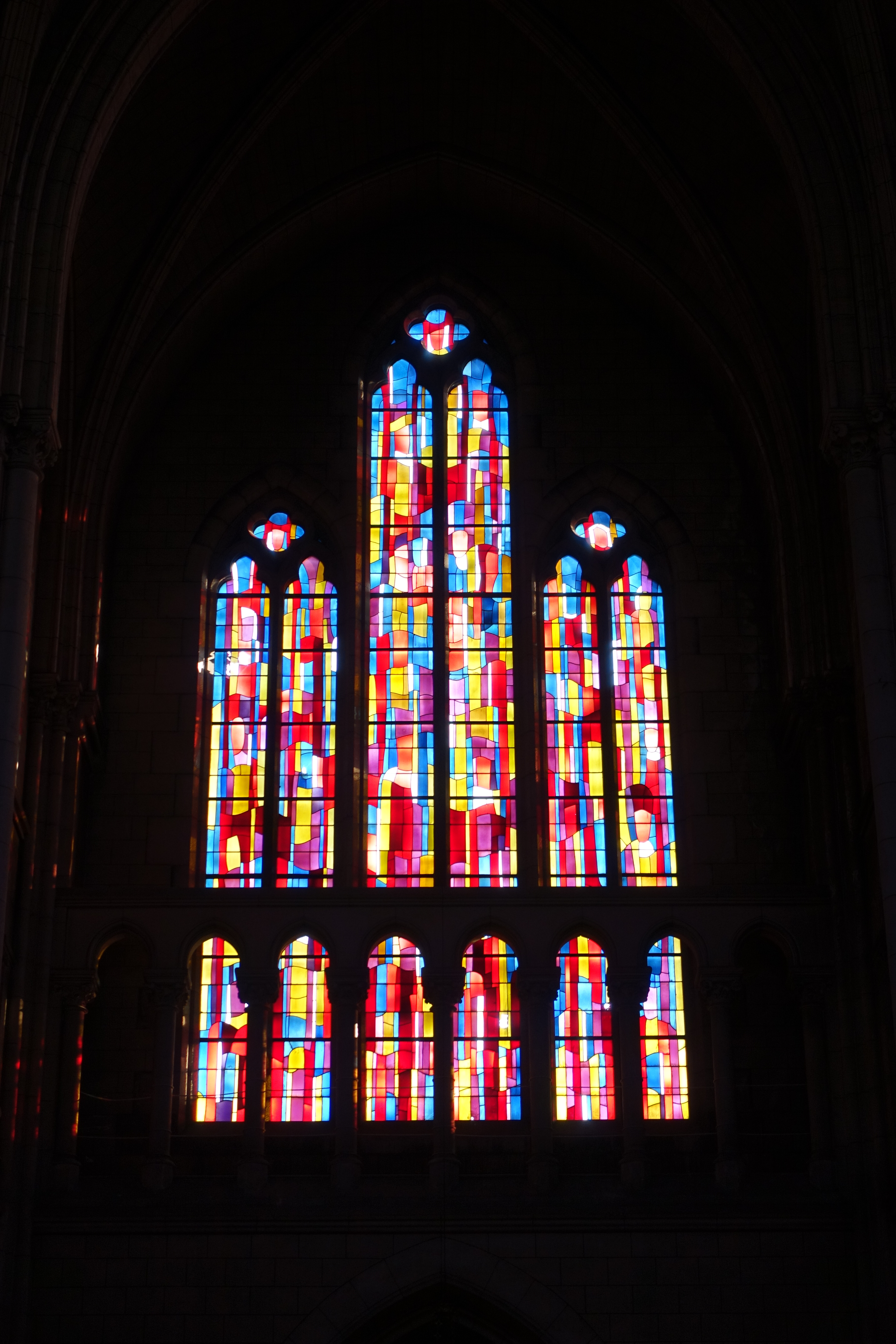
stained glass in the choir (1974)

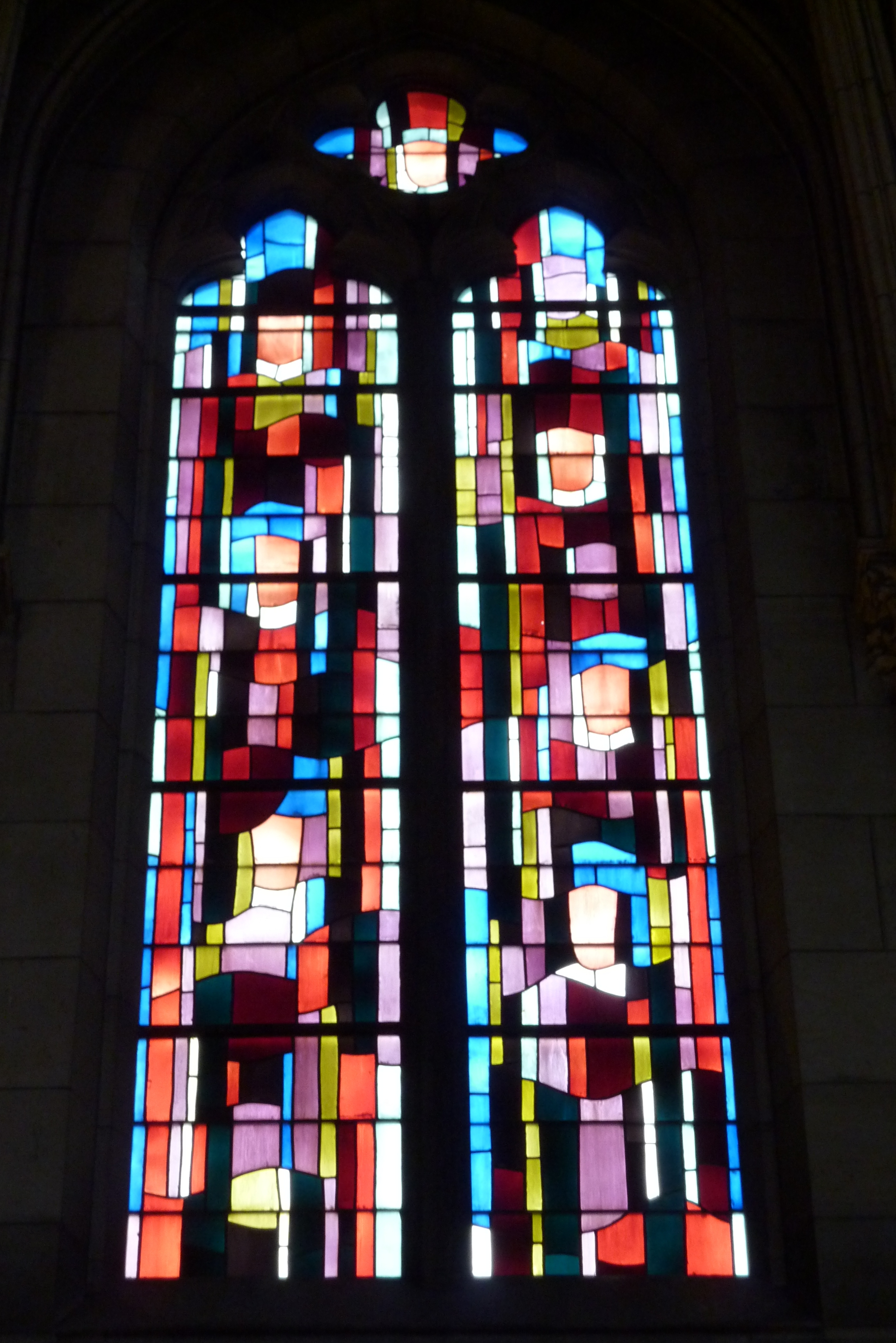
From the series "The Apocalypse"

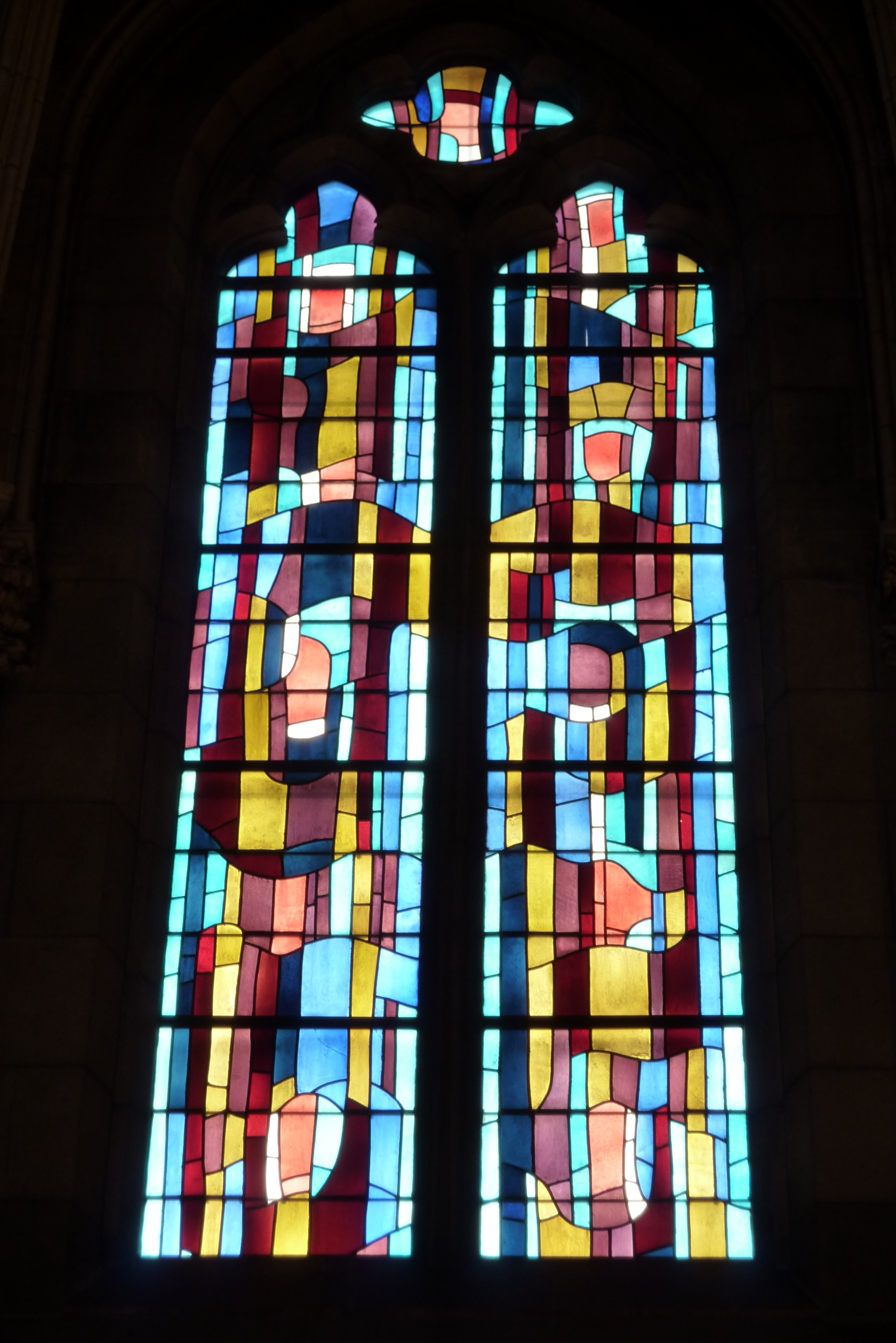
From the series "The Apocalypse" (1974)

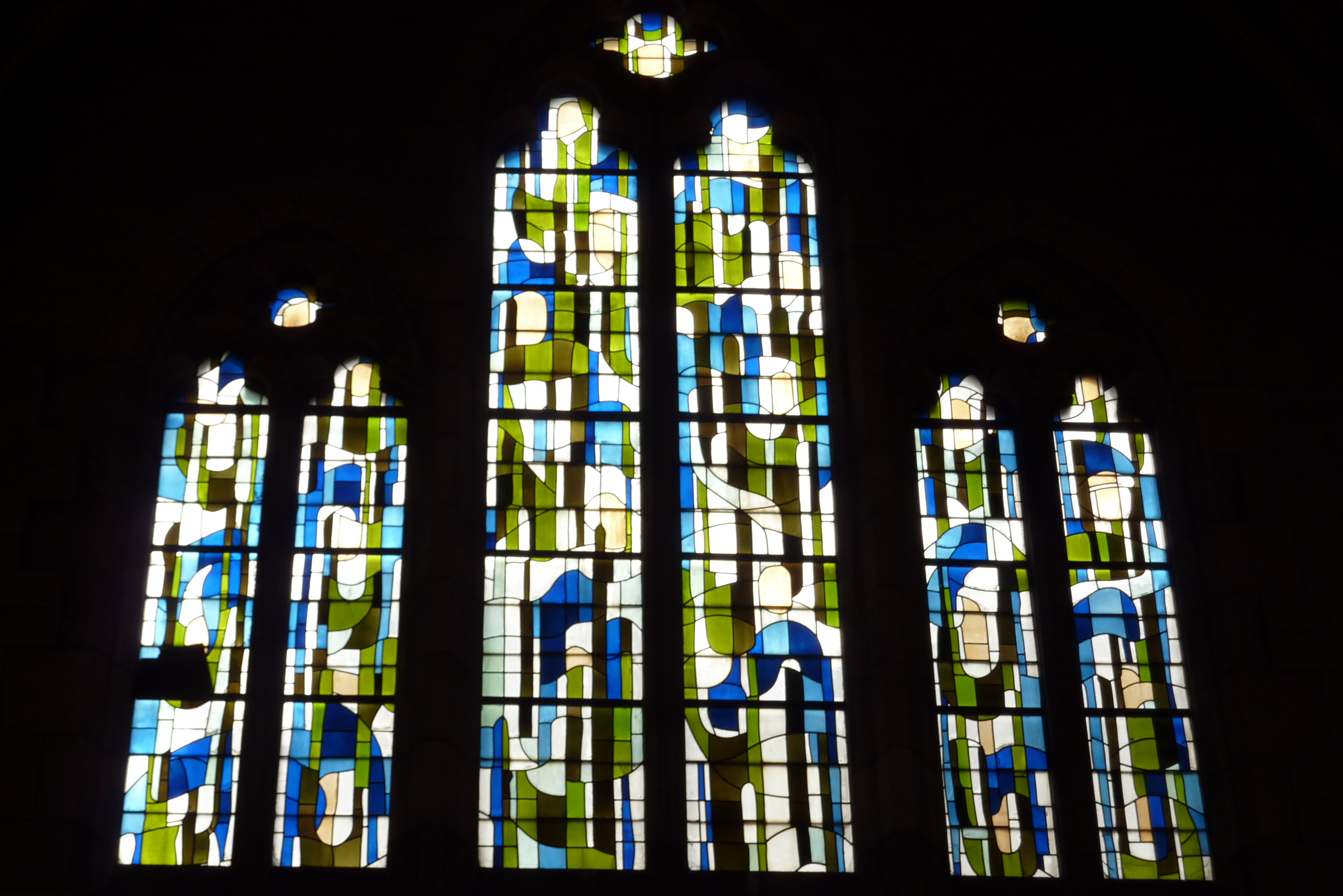
From the series "The Apocalypse" (1974)

=== Organ ===
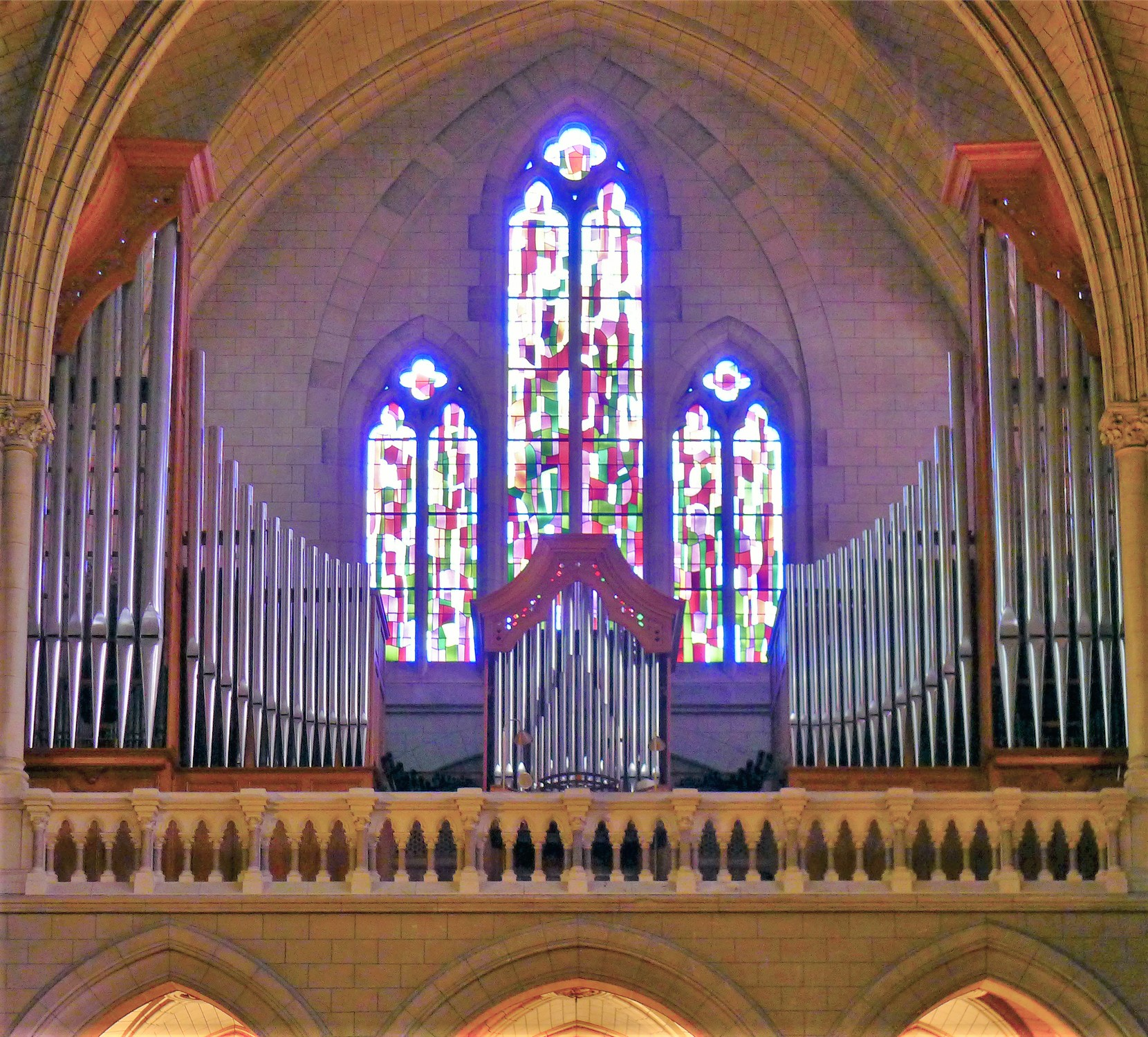
The organ

The organ of the church, in the tribune over the portal, was built by the Darggassies workshop in 1994, and updated in 2004.
