= Pınarbaşı, Çelikhan =

Town in Adıyaman Province, Turkey

Pınarbaşı
- Municipality
- Location in Turkey
- Coordinates: 38°01′48″N 38°10′59″E
- Country: Turkey
- Province: Adıyaman
- District: Çelikhan
- Population (2021): 3,193
- Time zone: UTC+3 (TRT)

Pınarbaşı (Kurdish: Bulam) is a town (belde) and municipality in the Çelikhan District, Adıyaman Province, Turkey. The town is populated by Kurds of the Reşwan tribe and had a population of 3,193 in 2021.

The town is divided into the neighborhoods of Aktaş, Balıkburnu, Cami, Çamlıyayla, Hacılar, İnönü, Kaya and Kurudere.

The town was impacted by the 2023 Turkey–Syria earthquake on 6 February, including ten mortalities. Subsequently, an aftershock (M_{w} 4.2) with an epicenter located in the town hit on 11 February.
