= Recep, Çelikhan =

Village in Adıyaman Province, Turkey

Recep
- Village
- Location within Turkey
- Coordinates: 37.987°N 38.360°E
- Country: Turkey
- Province: Adıyaman
- District: Çelikhan
- Population (2021): 306
- Time zone: UTC+3 (TRT)

Recep (Kurdish: Recew) is a village in the Çelikhan District, Adıyaman Province, Turkey. The village is populated by Kurds of the Cêlikan and Reşwan tribes and had a population of 306 in 2021.

The hamlets of Aydoğdu, Çem, Değirmen, Deveboynu, Eskiköy, Kayalık and Şahverdi are attached to Recep.
