= Köseuşağı, Çelikhan =

Village in Adıyaman Province, Turkey

Köseuşağı
- Village
- Location within Turkey
- Coordinates: 38.053°N 38.288°E
- Country: Turkey
- Province: Adıyaman
- District: Çelikhan
- Population (2021): 165
- Time zone: UTC+3 (TRT)

Köseuşağı (Kurdish: Koseuşaxi) is a village in the Çelikhan District, Adıyaman Province, Turkey. The village is populated by Kurds of the Reşwan tribe and had a population of 165 in 2021.

The hamlet of Yağmurlu is attached to Köseuşağı.
