= Kalecik, Çelikhan =

Village in Adıyaman Province, Turkey

Kalecik
- Village
- Location within Turkey
- Coordinates: 38.123°N 38.298°E
- Country: Turkey
- Province: Adıyaman
- District: Çelikhan
- Population (2021): 105
- Time zone: UTC+3 (TRT)

Kalecik (Kurdish: Qelacik) is a village in the Çelikhan District, Adıyaman Province, Turkey. The village is populated by Kurds of the Cêlikan tribe and had a population of 105 in 2021.

The hamlets of Akyüz and Buğdaylı are attached to the village.
