= Çelikhan District =

- District
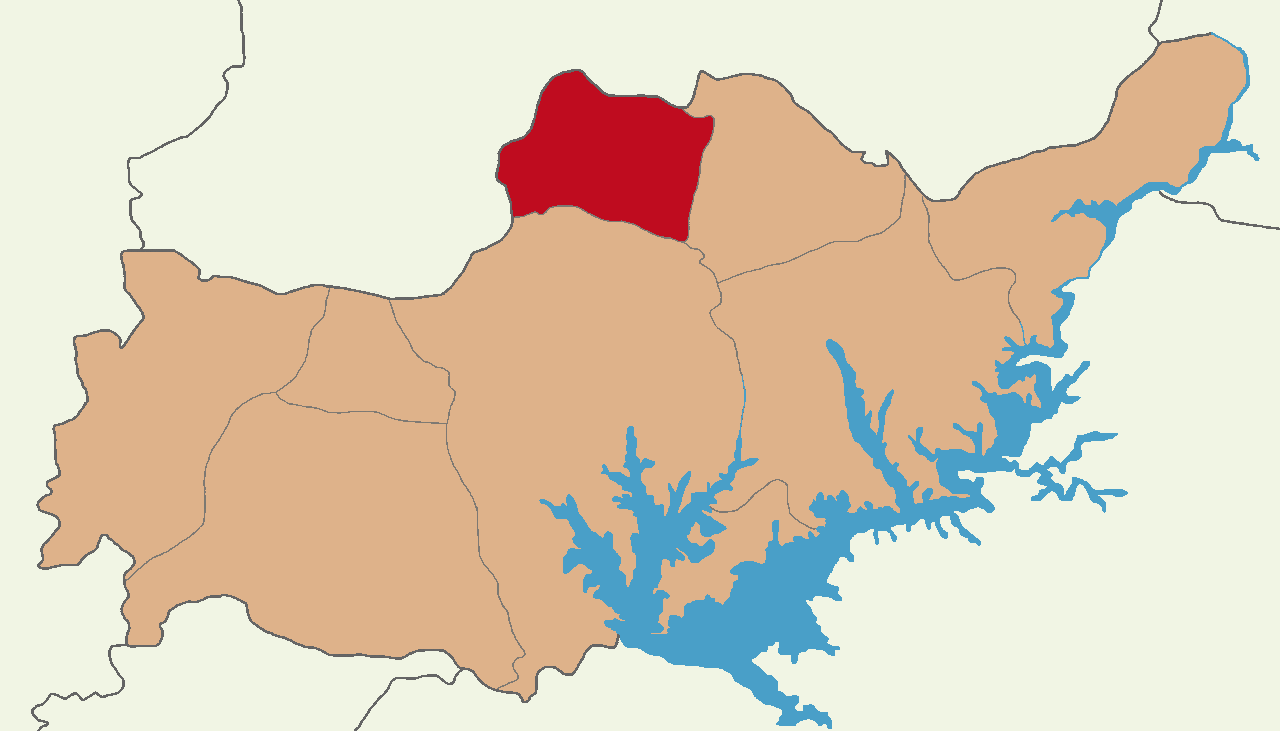
- Map showing Çelikhan District in Adıyaman Province

- Location in Turkey
- Coordinates: 38°02′N 38°15′E
- Country: Turkey
- Province: Adıyaman
- Seat: Çelikhan

Government
  - Kaymakam: Murat Uz
- Area: 444 km^{2} (171 sq mi)
- Population (2021): 15,294
  - Density: 34/km^{2} (89/sq mi)
- Time zone: UTC+3 (TRT)

Çelikhan District is a district of Adıyaman Province of Turkey. Its seat is the town Çelikhan. Its area is 444 km^{2}, and its population is 15,294 (2021). The district was established in 1954.

== Composition ==
There are 2 municipalities in Çelikhan District:

- Çelikhan (Komaşir)
- Pınarbaşı (Bulam)

There are 20 villages in Çelikhan District:

- Aksu (Bistigan)
- Altıntaş (Diregî)
- Askerhan (Eskeran)
- Bozgedik (Koltik)
- Çampınar
- Fatih
- Gölbağı (Aptulharab)
- İncirli
- Kalecik (Porga)
- Karaçayır (Xidiran)
- Karagöl (Golreş)
- Korucak (Rûtikan)
- Köseuşağı
- Mutlu (Şirfîn)
- Recep (Recew)
- Şerefhan (Şerefxan)
- Yağızatlı (Bistikan)
- Yeşilova
- Yeşiltepe
- Yeşilyayla (Gov)

== Demography ==
Around 60% of the district is populated by Kurds from the Reşwan tribe including the main town of Çelikhan.
