= Askerhan, Çelikhan =

Village in Adıyaman Province, Turkey

Askerhan
- Village
- Location within Turkey
- Coordinates: 38.050°N 38.429°E
- Country: Turkey
- Province: Adıyaman
- District: Çelikhan
- Population (2021): 273
- Time zone: UTC+3 (TRT)

Askerhan (formerly: İzci, Kurdish: Eskeran) is a village in the Çelikhan District, Adıyaman Province, Turkey. The village is populated by Kurds of the Reşwan tribe and had a population of 273 in 2021.
