= Korucak, Çelikhan =

Village in Adıyaman Province, Turkey

Korucak
- Village
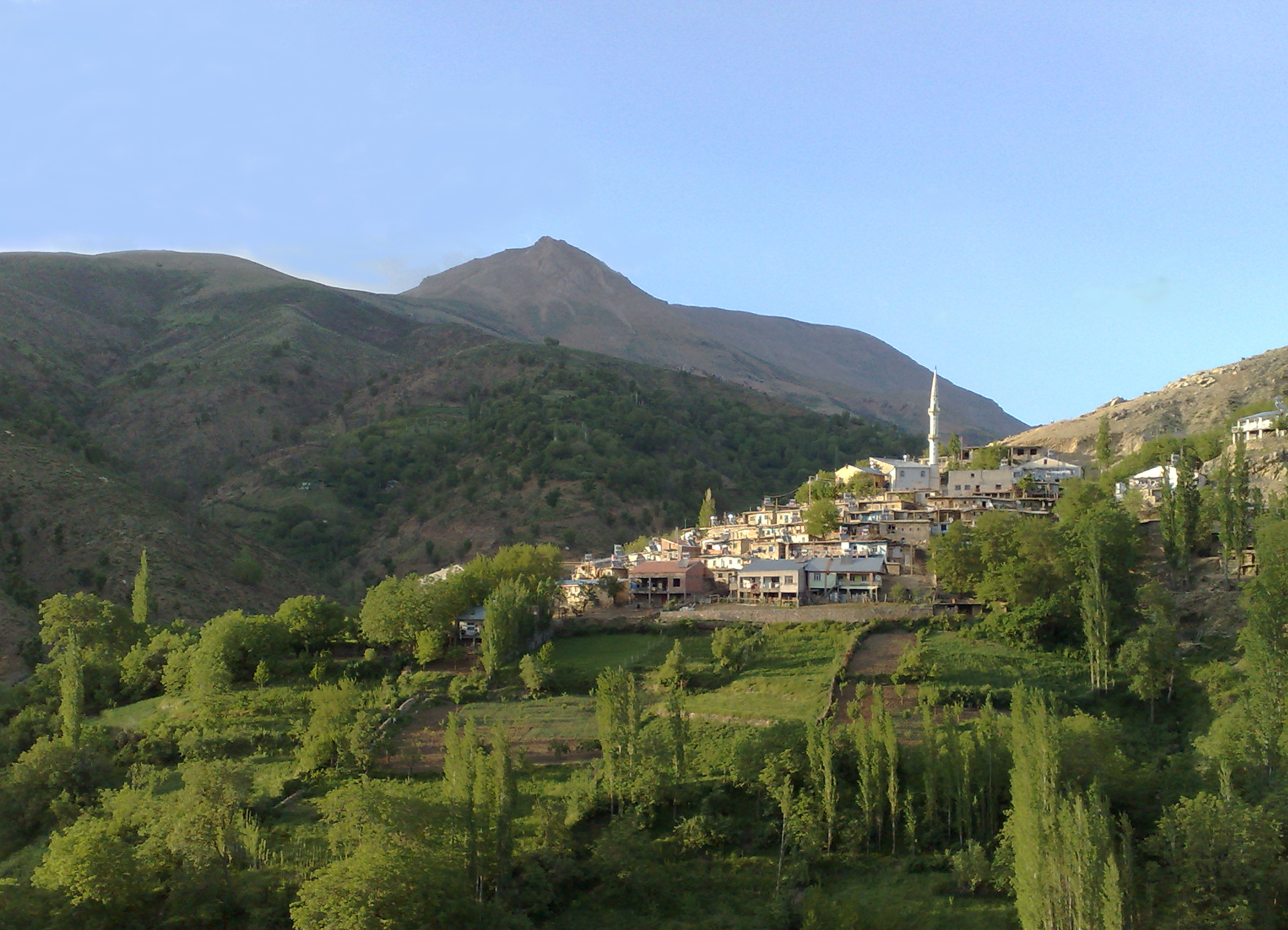

- Location within Turkey
- Coordinates: 38.065°N 38.376°E
- Country: Turkey
- Province: Adıyaman
- District: Çelikhan
- Population (2021): 334
- Time zone: UTC+3 (TRT)

Korucak (Kurdish: Rûtikan) is a village in the Çelikhan District, Adıyaman Province, Turkey. The village is populated by Kurds of the Reşwan tribe and had a population of 334 in 2021.
