= Gölbağı, Çelikhan =

Village in Adıyaman Province, Turkey

Gölbağı
- Village
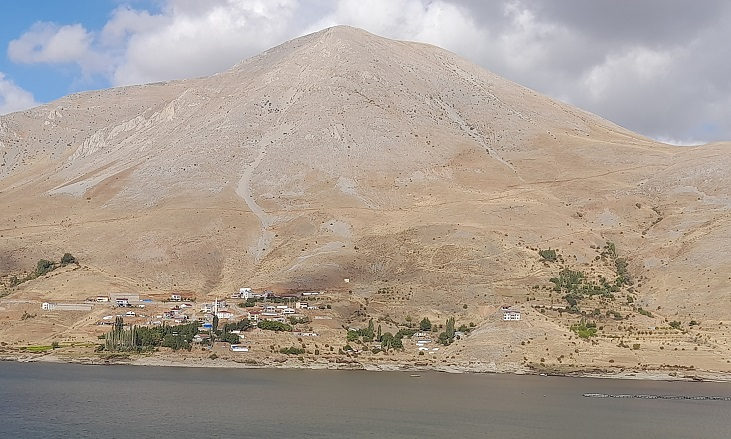
- A view of the village

- Location within Turkey
- Coordinates: 38°04′23″N 38°13′59″E
- Country: Turkey
- Province: Adıyaman
- District: Çelikhan
- Population (2021): 198
- Time zone: UTC+3 (TRT)

Gölbağı (Kurdish: Evdilxiraw) is a village in the Çelikhan District, Adıyaman Province, Turkey. The village is populated by Kurds of the Cêlikan tribe and had a population of 198 in 2021.

The hamlets of Koyunucular and Uzuntaş are attached to the village.
