= Athalie Manvoy =

Athalie Manvoy (1842-1887) was a French artist and member of the demimonde. Born in 1842, she became a celebrated actress and visual artist during the Second Empire.

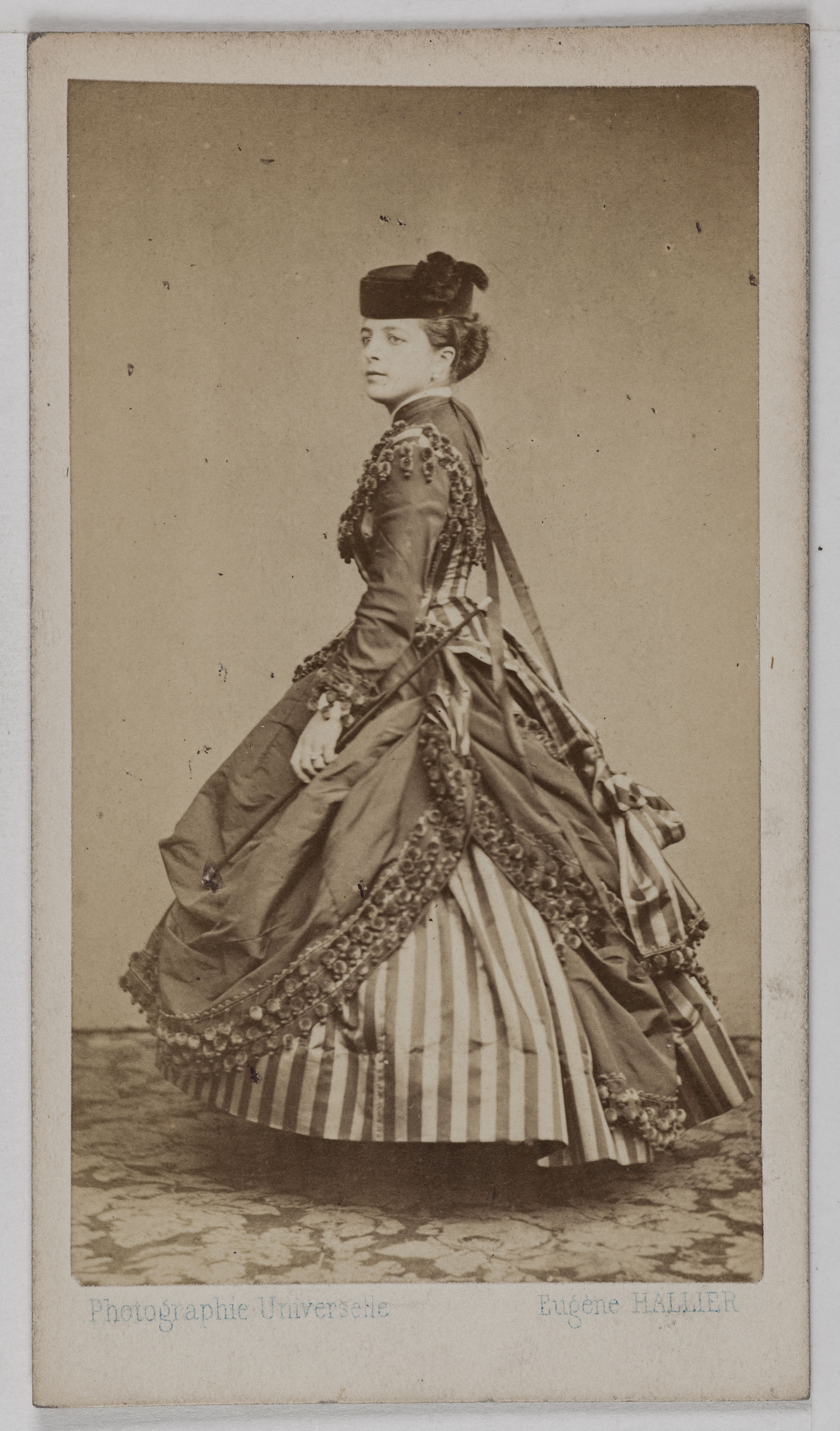
Athalie Monvoy photographed by Eugène Hallier.

Her early life is not well documented, but she was the child of middle-class parents. Manvoy was the student of Augustine Brohan and made her debut in the theatre in 1861. She got her start in vaudeville and was later known for playing Mme. Dubarry in La Reine Cotillion. Her painting, "Reflections of the Soul," received high praise at the Salon of 1868. She garnered praise and accolades from artistic societies. In 1875, Manvoy left France for the Michailovsky Theatre in Saint Petersburg, Russia.

Manvoy is notable for her mentoring of younger female artists, and she may have influenced the Impressionist movement through her use of light and atmosphere. In her time, she was ranked among other renowned women of the demimonde like Cora Pearl and Sarah Bernhardt.

In her later years, Manvoy did charity work. She died in Paris in 1887 at 45 years old. She was interred at the Cimetière du Père Lachaise in Paris.
