= Père Lachaise Cemetery =

Cemetery in Paris, France

Père Lachaise Cemetery Cimetière du Père-Lachaise (French) Cimetière de l'Est
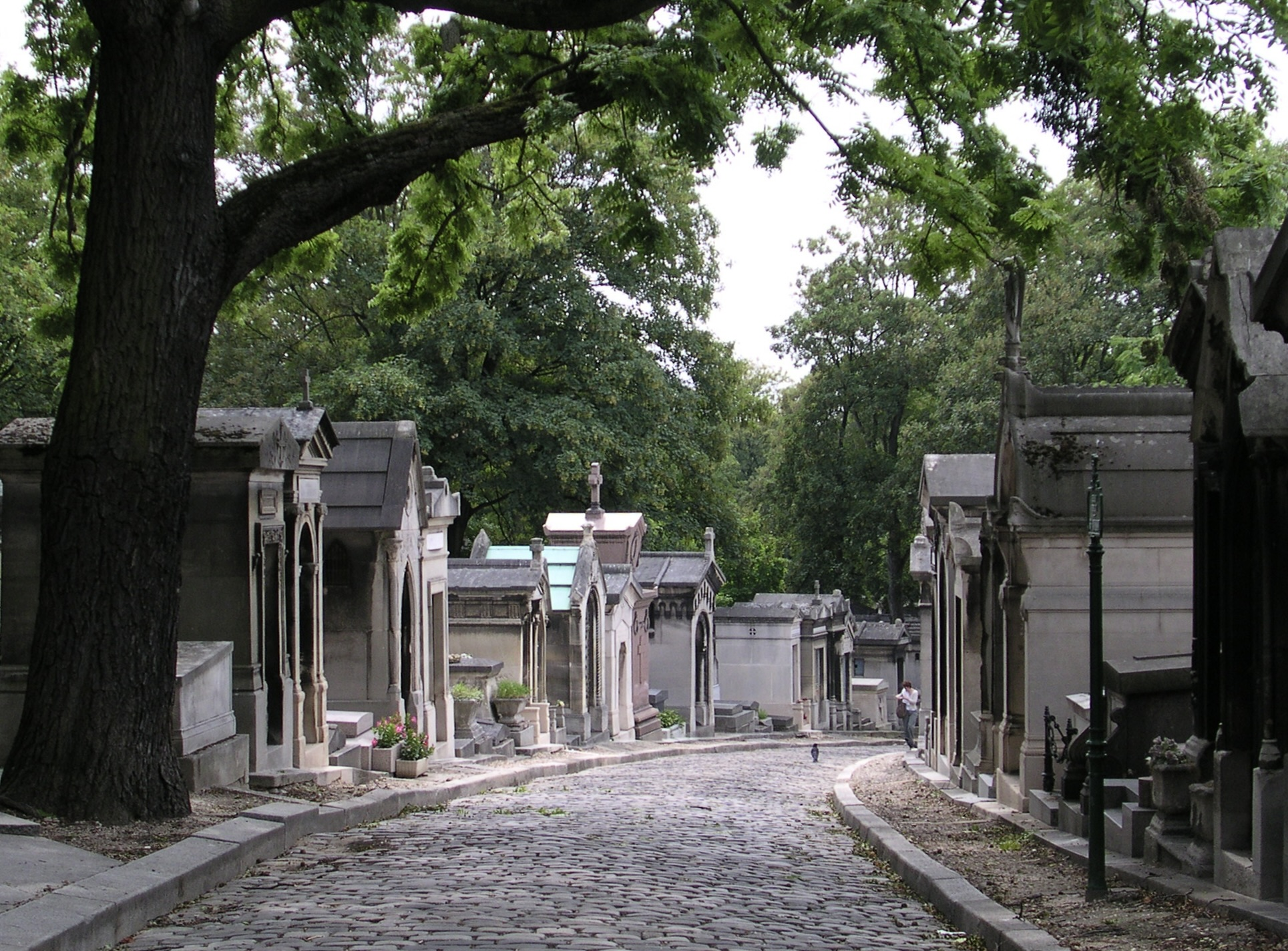
- Père Lachaise, Chemin Errazu
- Interactive map of Père Lachaise Cemetery; Cimetière du Père-Lachaise (French); Cimetière de l'Est

Details
- Established: 1804; 222 years ago
- Location: Paris
- Country: France
- Coordinates: 48.860°N 2.395°E
- Type: Public, non-denominational
- Size: 44 ha (110 acres)
- No. of interments: Above 1 million

Père Lachaise Cemetery (French: Cimetière du Père-Lachaise [simtjɛʁ dy pɛʁ laʃɛːz], formerly Cimetière de l'Est, lit. 'Cemetery of the East') is the largest cemetery in Paris, France, at 44 hectares (110 acres).

Père Lachaise is located in the 20th arrondissement and was the first garden cemetery, as well as the first municipal cemetery in Paris. It is also the site of three World War I memorials. The cemetery is located on the Boulevard de Ménilmontant. The Paris Métro station Philippe Auguste on Line 2 is next to the main entrance, while the station Père Lachaise, on both Line 2 and Line 3, is 500 m (1,640 ft) away near a side entrance.

== History and description ==
=== Origin ===
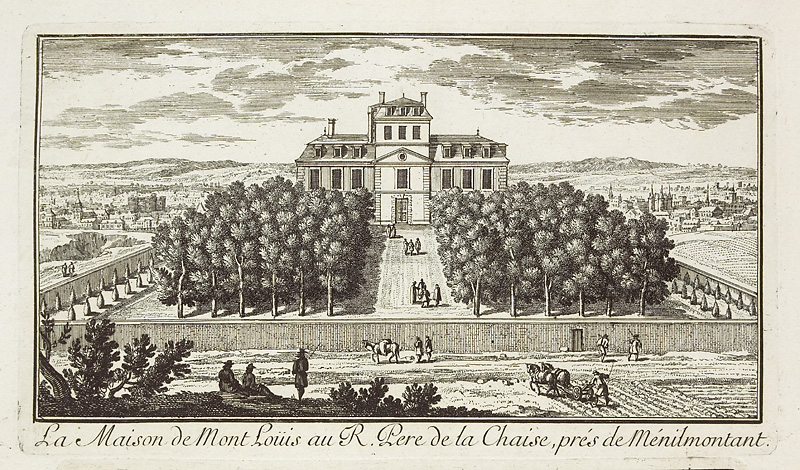
The House of Père François de la Chaise, Mont-Louis (17th century)

The cemetery of Père Lachaise opened in 1804 and takes its name from the confessor to Louis XIV, Père François de la Chaise (1624–1709), who lived in the Jesuit house rebuilt during 1682 on the site of the chapel. The property, situated on the hillside from which the king watched skirmishing between the armies of the Condé and Turenne during the Fronde, was bought by the city in 1804. Established as a cemetery by Napoleon during that year, plans were laid out by Alexandre-Théodore Brongniart; the property was later extended. Napoleon, who had been proclaimed Emperor by the Senate three days earlier, had declared during the Consulate: "Every citizen has the right to be buried regardless of race or religion."

After the closing of the Holy Innocents' Cemetery on 1 December 1780 and as the city graveyards of Paris filled, several new, large cemeteries, outside the precincts of the capital, replaced them: Montmartre Cemetery in the north; Père Lachaise in the east; Montparnasse Cemetery in the south and Passy Cemetery in the west.

In 1803, the French officials approved the transformation of 17 hectares (42 acres) of Mont-Louis into the Cemetery of the East, and the work was given to neoclassical architect Alexandre-Théodore Brongniart. He used English-style gardens as inspiration, designing the cemetery with uneven paths adorned with diverse trees and plants and lined with carved graves. He anticipated various funerary monuments but only one was finally built: the grave of the Greffulhe family, in a refined neo-Gothic style.

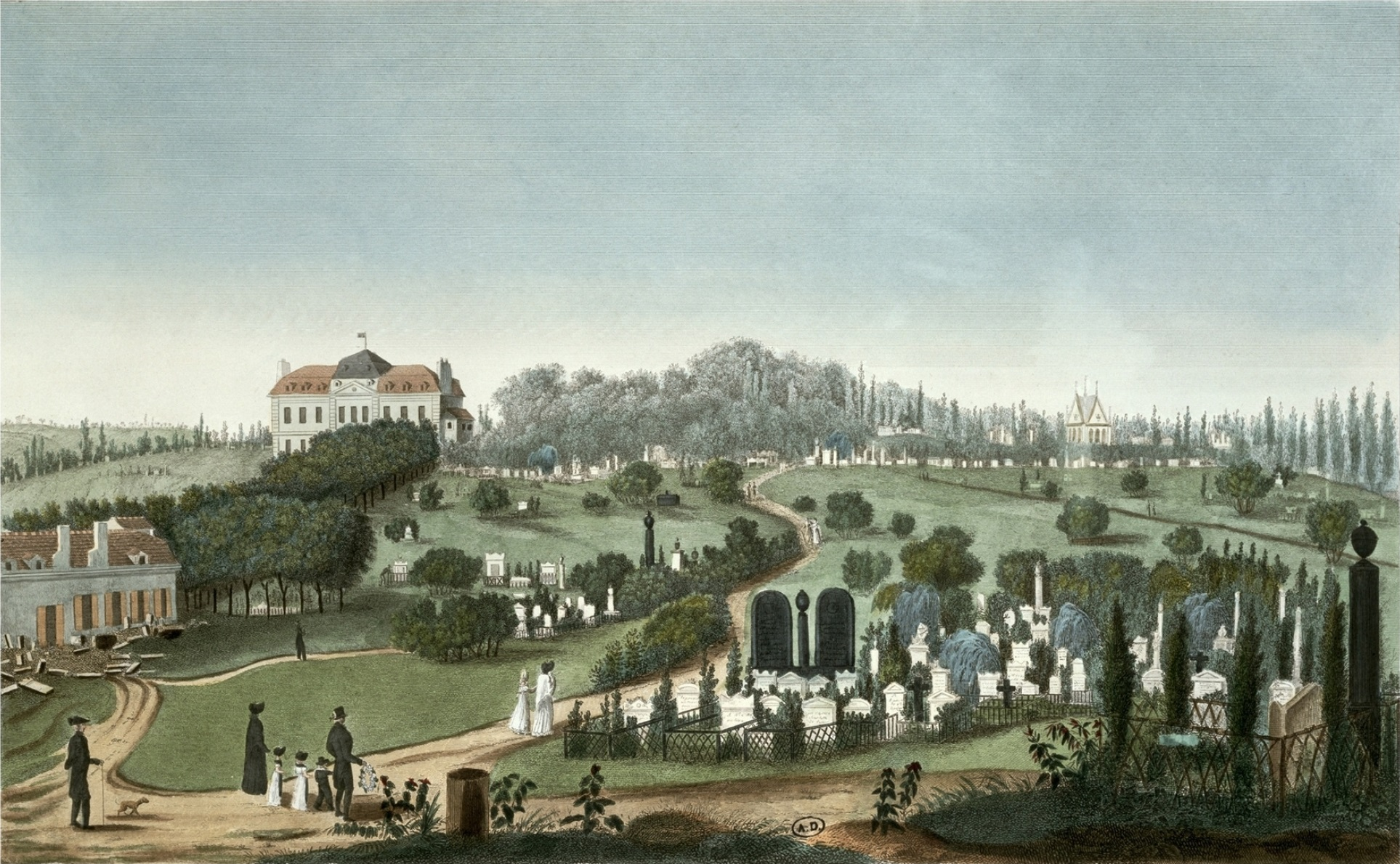
The cemetery, an English-style park, with the tomb of Héloïse and Abélard (top right) (1815)

At the time of its opening, the cemetery was considered to be situated too far from the city and attracted few funerals. Moreover, many Roman Catholics refused to have their graves in a place that had not been blessed by the Church.

In 1804, the Père Lachaise contained only 13 graves. The next year there were 44 burials, with 49 during 1806, 62 during 1807 and 833 during 1812. Consequently, the administrators devised a marketing strategy to improve the cemetery's stature: in 1817, with great fanfare, they organised the transfer of the remains of Jean de La Fontaine and Molière to the new resting place. Then, in another great spectacle, the purported remains of Pierre Abélard and Héloïse d'Argenteuil were also transferred to the cemetery along with their monument's canopy made from fragments of the abbey of Nogent-sur-Seine. By tradition, lovers or lovelorn singles leave letters at the crypt in tribute to the couple or in hope of finding true love.

This strategy achieved its desired effect: people began clamouring to be buried among the famous citizens. Records show that the Père Lachaise contained more than 33,000 graves in 1830. Père Lachaise was expanded five times: in 1824, 1829, 1832, 1842, and 1850. At present, there are more than 1 million bodies buried there, and many more represented in the columbarium, which holds the remains of those who had requested cremation.

The Communards' Wall (Mur des Fédérés), located within the cemetery, was the site where 147 Communards were executed by the French Army during the Semaine sanglante, "The Bloody Week", following the final battles between the Army and the Paris Commune. The Commune soldiers, who had been captured in earlier battles by the French Army, were taken to the prisons of Mazas and la Roquette, where they were quickly tried by military courts and sentenced to death. They were then taken to Père Lachaise, where they were lined up against the wall and shot, and buried in common graves. The site is a traditional rallying point for members of the French political Left. Adolphe Thiers, the second elected President of France, and the first President of the French Third Republic, who led the suppression of the Commune, is also interred in the cemetery.

== Crematorium and columbarium ==
A funerary chapel was erected in 1823 by Étienne-Hippolyte Godde at the exact place of the former Jesuit house. This same Neoclassical architect created the monumental entrance a few years later.

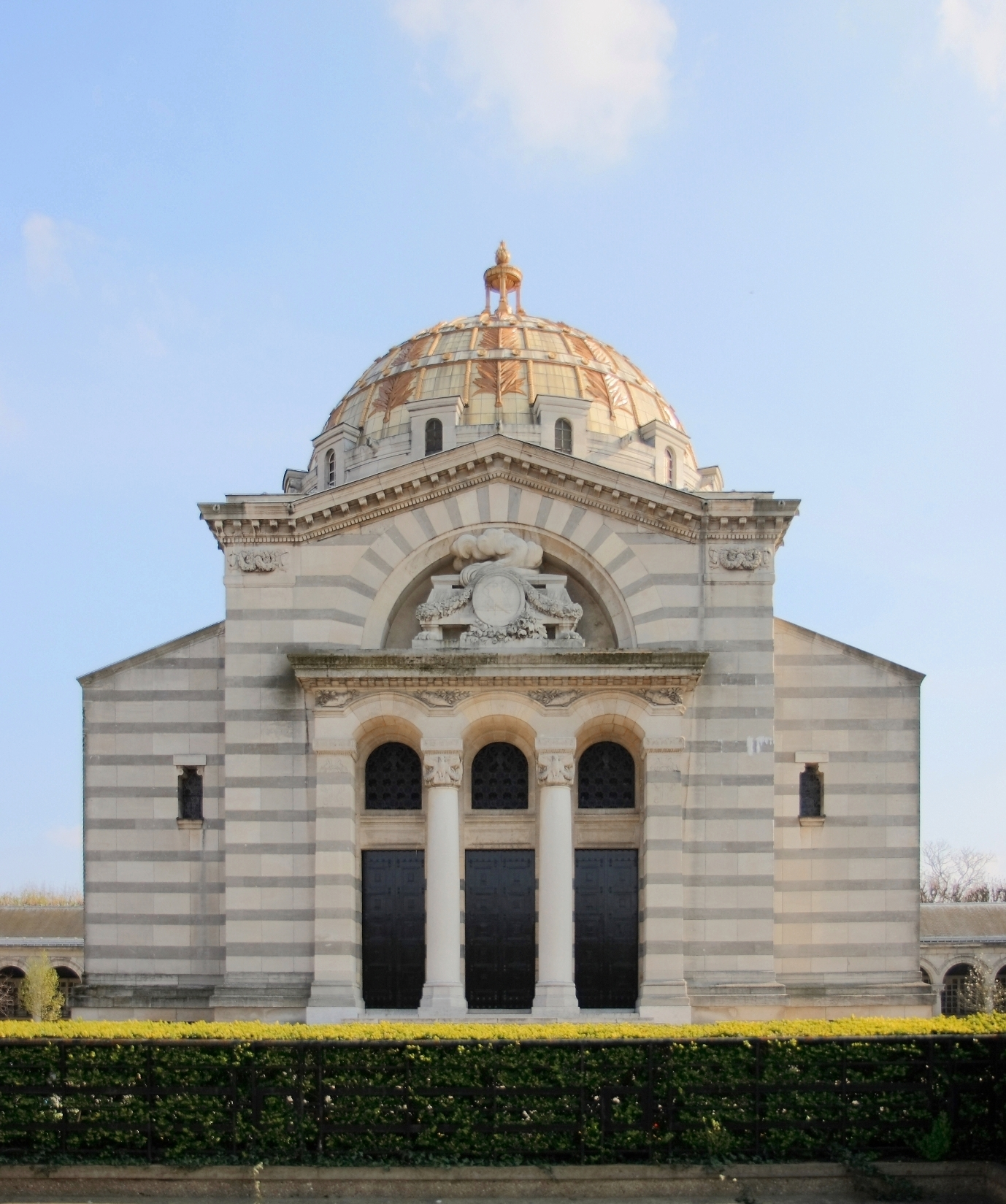
Crematorium and columbarium building

A columbarium and a crematorium of a Byzantine Revival architecture were designed in 1894 by Jean-Camille Formigé in one building. The roof consists of a large brick and sandstone dome, three small domes and two chimneys. In the 1920s, the main dome was decorated with stained glass windows by Carl Maumejean. The final columbarium is composed of four levels: two in the basement and two exterior levels, both can contain more than 40,800 cases.

The crematorium was the first built in France. The first cremation took place on 30 January 1889, a little over a year after the law of 15 November 1887 proclaimed freedom of funerals and thus authorised cremations. Nonetheless, cremation remained uncommon until the end of the 20th century. With the work of anticlerical and free-thinkers (e.g. Charles-Ange Laisant, André Lorulot), the use of cremation became more popular after the overturning of the ban by the Catholic Church in 1963. From 49 cremations in 1889, there were about 5,000 cremations at the beginning of the 21st century. In 2012, cremation represented 45% of funerals in Paris.

Inside the columbarium are the remains of numerous celebrities, including the director Max Ophüls and the comedian Pierre Dac. The box inscribed with Maria Callas' name is only a cenotaph.

== Religion ==
An 1804 law put in place by Napoleon addressed the question of cemetery organisation relating to religious beliefs. It was required that an entire cemetery be built, or at least a section of a large cemetery should be dedicated to a specific religion.

The law of separation of church and state on 9 December 1905 had no impact on Père Lachaise because religious emblems were still allowed on private funeral monuments. The cemetery cross was removed in June 1883.

=== Chapel ===
Where the former house of Père Lachaise stood, Alexandre-Théodore Brongniart envisioned an outstanding pyramid to be used by all Christian denominations. It was never constructed but the Parisian architect Étienne-Hippolyte Godde began building a chapel in 1820. It was sanctified by the Catholic Church in 1834 and is supported by the basilique Notre-Dame-du-Perpetuel-Secours.

=== Jewish enclosure ===
In 1804, a law was passed which allowed the sharing of cemeteries between diverse religions. The Jewish enclosure in Père Lachaise opened on 18 February 1810 in the 7th division. Enclosed by a wall, this part of the cemetery included a purification room and a pavilion for the caretaker.

From 1865 to 1887 the 87th division also served as the Jewish enclosure. After the revocation of segregation within cemeteries in 1881, the walls of the enclosure were destroyed, and the Jewish dead were buried in the 96th division.

Some noteworthy individuals buried in the 19th century include the actress Rachel Félix, the first French rabbi, J.D. Sintzheim, and Robles, Singer and Fould Rothschild.

=== Muslim enclosure ===
In 1856, a Muslim enclosure was opened in the 85th division – part of this section of the cemetery was newly acquired in the last extension in 1850. Work on the mosque started in 1855 based on the plans created by Marie-Gabriel Jolivet. The monument included a waiting room, a lavatorium intended for the purification of Muslims, and a counter for religious effects.

The Muslim enclosure opened on 1 January 1857, making it the first Muslim cemetery in France. Between 1856 and 1870, there were only 44 burials – 6 perpetual concessions, 7 temporary and 31 free of charge. The enclosure was reduced multiple times and in 1871, an unused part was dedicated to the Jewish religion.

The law of 14 November 1881 made segregation in cemeteries illegal. The fence of the enclosure was removed but the plant hedge was preserved. Despite the law, the mosque was conserved but the Ottoman Empire, responsible for maintenance, lapsed in their responsibility. Plans for reconstruction were made, but during World War I, when the Ottomans became an ally to Germany and an enemy to France, those plans were cancelled. The mosque was destroyed in 1914 and a plan for reconstruction was abandoned in 1923 in lieu of the project to build the Grand Mosque of Paris.

== Monuments ==
In 1899, the Monument aux Morts by Albert Bartholomé was erected in Père Lachaise as a memorial to unidentified deceased Parisians. The monument holds a communal ossuary. In addition to the elaborate tombs, there are various monuments dedicate to individuals or groups of people including:

- Monuments for foreign soldiers who died for France during World War II
- Monuments in the memory of victims of concentration and extermination camps
- Monument in memory of the Parisians killed during the Second World War
- Monuments in homage to victims of catastrophic aerial accidents
- Monuments in homage to victims of June 1848 (the suppression of the Paris working class uprising)
- Monument for the Rwandan genocide
- Monument for the 228 people that died aboard Air France Flight 447

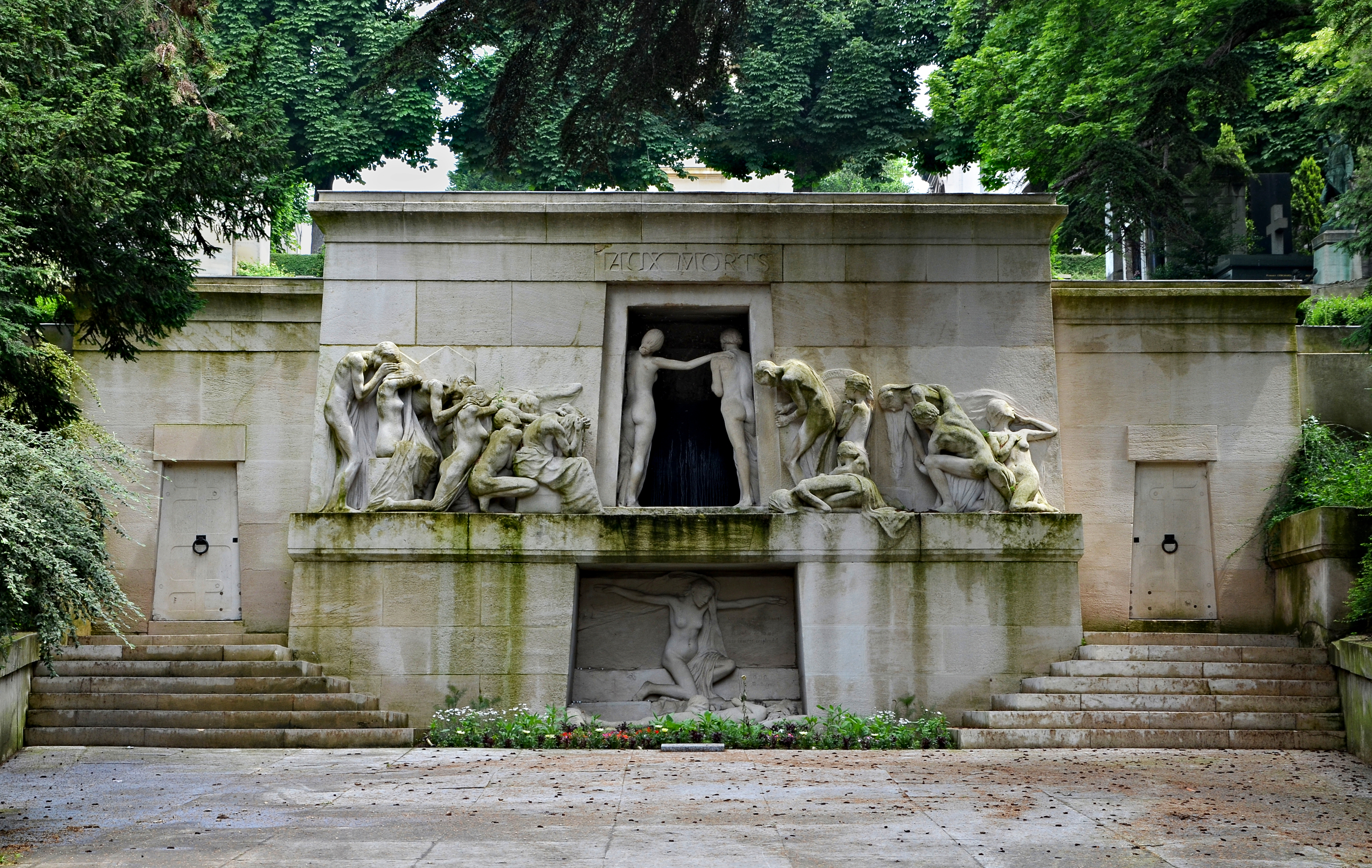
Monument aux morts, behind lies the ossuary

=== Aux Morts ossuary ===
Behind the Aux Morts ('to the dead') monument sculpted by Albert Bartholomé lies an ossuary of the bones of Parisians from cemeteries all over the city, a smaller kind of modern-day catacombs. Although the monument is well known, it is not general knowledge that it is also an ossuary, and its doors usually remain closed and locked to the public. When it became overcrowded recently, the bones were removed for cremation and returned to the ossuary after the incineration process. In the Père Lachaise ossuary, efforts are made to store bones and ashes in separate boxes.

== Cemetery today ==
Map of the Père-Lachaise Cemetery

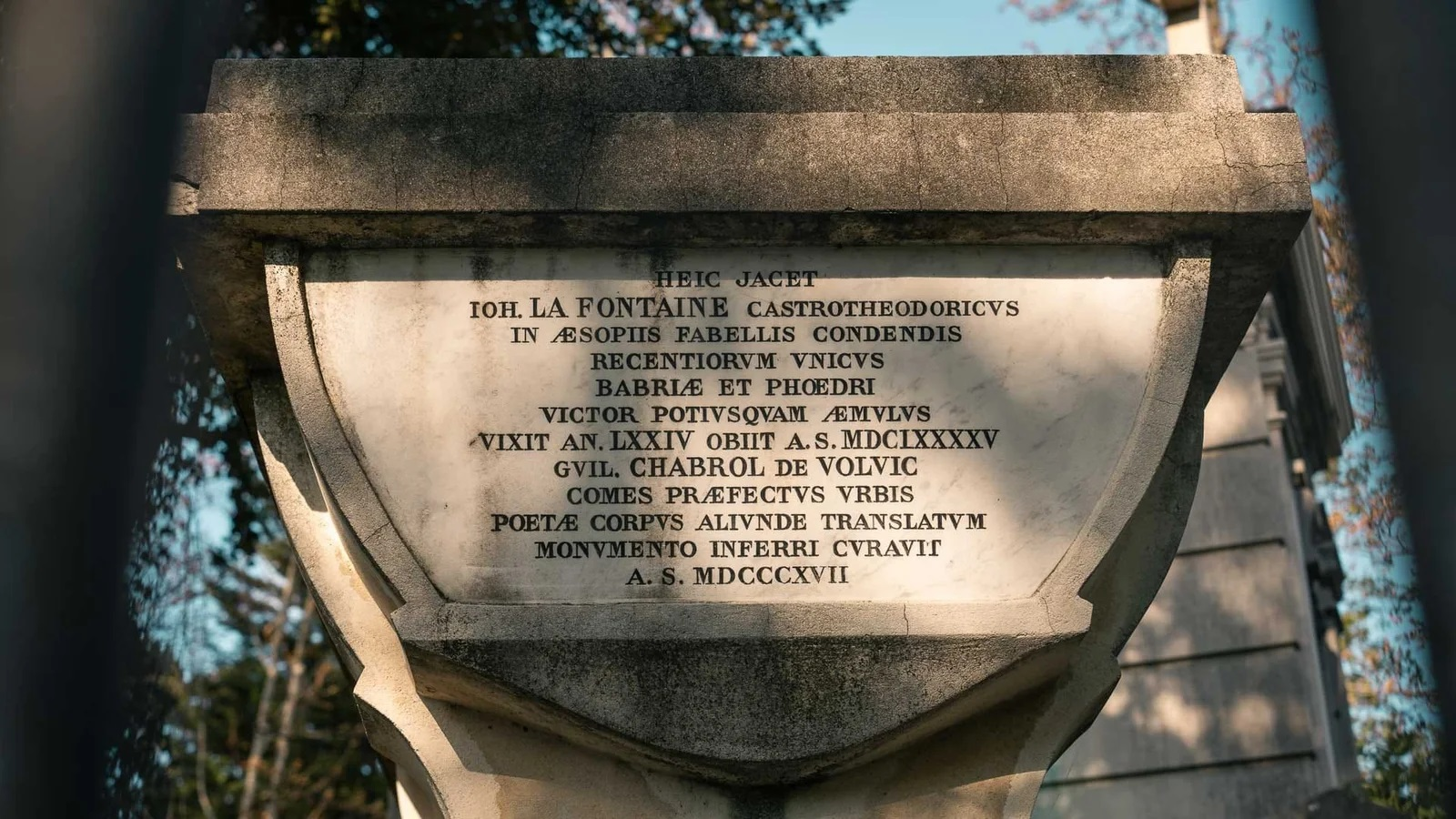
Grave of Jean de La Fontaine, Père Lachaise Cemetery

Père Lachaise is an operating cemetery and accepts new burials. However, the rules to be buried in a Paris cemetery are that people may be buried in one of these cemeteries if they die in the French capital city or if they lived there. Being buried in Père Lachaise is even more difficult nowadays as there is a waiting list and very few plots are available.

During relatively recent times, the Père Lachaise has adopted a standard practice of issuing 30-year leases on gravesites, so that if a lease is not renewed by a family, the remains can be removed, space made for a new grave, and the overall deterioration of the cemetery minimised. Abandoned remains are boxed, tagged and moved to Aux Morts ossuary, still in the Père Lachaise cemetery.

Although some sources incorrectly estimate the number of interred as 300,000 in Père Lachaise, according to the official website of the city of Paris, one million people have been buried there as of 2012.

== Habitat ==
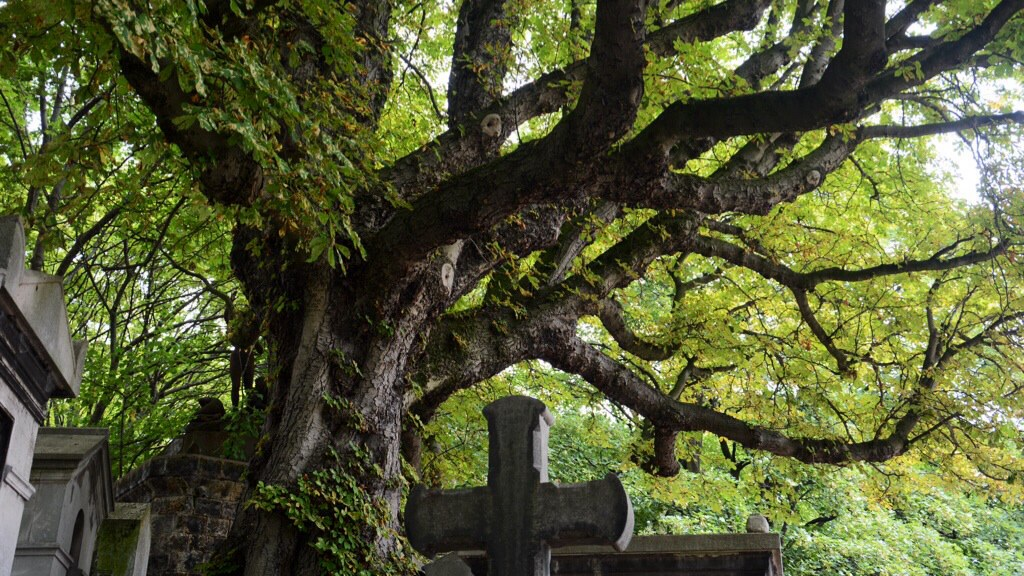
Example of flora of Père Lachaise

Like other cemeteries around the world, Père Lachaise has become a miniature biodiversity preserve. A change in management practices, including a prohibition on the use of pesticides and a sterilisation program that reduced the cemetery's population of feral cats, set the stage for what is now described as a "rich ecosystem." Flora now growing at the cemetery includes cyclamen and orchids. The cemetery also hosts a population of foxes and 100 species of birds, including flycatchers and tawny owls.

== Notable interments ==
Buried at Père Lachaise are many famous figures in the arts, including:

- Miguel Ángel Asturias
- Honoré de Balzac
- Gilbert Bécaud
- Sarah Bernhardt
- Georges Bizet
- Frédéric Chopin
- Colette
- George Enescu
- Max Ernst
- Olivia de Havilland
- Sadegh Hedayat
- Amy Horrocks
- Suzanne Lacascade
- Ahmet Kaya
- Athalie Manvoy
- Marcel Marceau
- Georges Méliès
- Amedeo Modigliani
- Molière
- Jim Morrison
- Georges Perec
- Michel Petrucciani
- Édith Piaf
- Camille Pissarro
- Francis Poulenc
- Marcel Proust
- Raymond Radiguet
- Marjane Satrapi
- Gertrude Stein
- Gerda Taro
- Oscar Wilde
- Monique Wittig
- Richard Wright
- Gaspard Ulliel

Many famous philosophers, scientists, and historical figures are buried there as well, including:

- Peter Abelard
- Paul Bénichou
- Pierre Bourdieu
- Jean-François Champollion
- Auguste Comte
- Georges Cuvier
- Joseph Fourier
- Augustin-Jean Fresnel
- Manuel Godoy
- Georges-Eugène Haussmann
- Samuel Hahnemann
- Jean-François Lyotard
- Félix Guattari
- Nestor Makhno
- Malika Kishwar
- Maurice Merleau-Ponty
- Sir Sidney Smith
- Jean Moulin
- Henri de Saint-Simon
- Jean-Baptiste Say
- Louis-Nicolas Davout
- Michel Ney
- Madho Rao Scindia I
- Emmanuel Joseph Sieyès
- Marie Souvestre
- J. R. D. Tata
- Adolphe Thiers
- Trần Đức Thảo
- Rafael Trujillo
- Alexandre Colonna-Walewski
- Charles-Pierre Augereau
- Joseph Louis Gay-Lussac

== In popular culture ==
Père Lachaise is often referenced in French culture and has been included in various films, literary works, video games and songs. A number of English-language works also make reference to the cemetery.

=== Films ===
- 1960: Oscar Wilde – 1960 film. The ending credits roll over a shot of the poet's tomb.
- 1979: French Postcards – Laura visits Sidonie-Gabrielle Colette, Isadora Duncan, and Édith Piaf burial sites.
- 1991: The Doors by Oliver Stone – biographical film of Jim Morrison which includes various snapshots of the tombs of those buried in Père Lachaise, such as Georges Bizet, Oscar Wilde, Marcel Proust. Like Morrison, a poet and singer, the tombs shown are all people of the arts, mainly music, literature and poetry.
- 2001: Amélie by Jean-Pierre Jeunet – images of the burial of Sarah Bernhardt with music from Samuel Barber
- 2006: Paris, I Love You by Wes Craven – segment about the 20th arrondissement, a couple is strolling through the cemetery where the woman is trying to find Oscar Wilde's tomb
- 2007: 2 Days in Paris by Julie Delpy – scene where Marion is leaning on Jim Morrison's tomb
- 2009: Oscar and Jim short film set entirely in the cemetery
- 2012: Holy Motors by Leos Carax – Monsieur Merde kidnaps Kay M, a model, from a photo shoot in the cemetery
- 2016: Elle by Paul Verhoeven – the final scene takes place at the columbarium of the cemetery where Michele is seen in front of her parents' urn
- 2018: Fantastic Beasts: The Crimes of Grindelwald by David Yates – Grindelwald convenes his followers at Père Lachaise towards the end of the film.
- 2020: Dil Bechara – Kizie Basu proposes Manny before returning to India.

=== Television ===
- 2000: Relic Hunter – Season 1, Episode 22 "Memories of Montmartre" – A tiara known as the Heart of Europe, the relic being sought in the episode, is hidden in vault A317 in Père Lachaise.
- 2021: Emily in Paris – Season 2, Episode 3 "Bon Anniversaire!" – Luc takes Emily to the grave of Honore de Balzac to tell her a story.
- 2022: Family Guy – Season 21, Episode 7 "The Stewaway" – Stewie goes to look for the grave of Marcel Proust after getting lost in Paris at night.
- 2023: The Walking Dead: Daryl Dixon – Season 1, episode 3 – Daryl Dixon traverses through the cemetery and points out Jim Morrison's grave.

=== Literature ===
- 1833: Ferragus by Balzac – description of cemetery
- 1834: Père Goriot by Balzac – the Père Goriot is buried in Père Lachaise
- 1842: Père la Chaise., a poem by Lydia Huntley Sigourney recording her impressions of the cemetery on her visit to Europe in 1840.
- 1844: Le comte de Monte Cristo by Alexandre Dumas – M. de Villefort "...considered the cemetery of Père Lachaise alone worthy of receiving the mortal remains of a Parisian family..." and intended to bury his believed-deceased daughter Valentine there.
- 1862: Les Misérables by Victor Hugo – Jean Valjean is buried in Père Lachaise
- 1869: Sentimental Education by Gustave Flaubert – description of cemetery
- 1948: The Old Beauty by Willa Cather – Gabrielle de Coucy is buried in Père Lachaise
- 2001: Waiting for Gertrude: A Graveyard Gothic by Bill Richardson - set in Père-Lachaise Cemetery, the souls of its notable occupants have been reincarnated into the bodies of feral cats.
- 2004: The Enemy by Lee Child – Jack and Joe Reacher's mother gets buried there after passing from cancer due being part of the French Resistance during WWII. She went by the name Beatrice.
- 2023: Monument to the Dead by Spanish author Victoria Sánchez is based on this cemetery. The author uses her social media presence, notably her TikTok account "bluebardot" to tell stories about its graves.

=== Video games ===
- 2015: The Witcher 3: Wild Hunt by CD Projekt – in the expansion Blood and Wine, a cemetery by the name "Mère-Lachaiselongue" is used to pay homage to the Père Lachaise cemetery. The Blood and Wine expansion is set in Toussaint, a French-inspired region.
- 2009: The Saboteur by Pandemic Studios features the Père Lachaise Cemetery on its depictions of Nazi occupied Paris. A couple of missions are set inside the cemetery itself.

=== Art works ===
- 2020: Mon Ami by David Eustace – Photographic portfolio created at Père Lachaise Cemetery with artist Douglas Gordon. Exhibited at the Signet Library in 2023.

== See also ==
- List of burials at Père Lachaise Cemetery
- List of burial places of classical musicians
- List of tourist attractions in Paris

== Bibliography ==
- Tombs, Robert (2021). La guerre contre Paris – 1871: l'ármée met fin à la Commune. Paris: Flammarion. ISBN 978-2-0802-4351-5.
- Gallot, B. (2022), La vie d'un cimetière ("The Secret Life of a Cemetery"), Les Arènes.
