= Ağlama Bebeğim =

Studio album by Ahmet Kaya
- Released: April 1985
- Genre: Protest
- Label: Taç Plak, Gam Müzik
- Producer: Yapımcı Cihan Sütşurup & Fikret Kuroğlu

Ağlama Bebeğim (tr: "Don't Cry My Child") is Ahmet Kaya's first album, released in 1985, but censored in Turkey shortly following the release. It features a number of Kaya's own poems, but also includes settings of poems by Ahmed Arif, Sabahattin Ali, Nazım Hikmet, and Mehmet Akif Ersoy.

== Track listing ==
1. "Ağlama Bebeğim" (Don't Cry My Child)
  - lyrics and music: Ahmet Kaya
2. "Kara Yazı" (Bad destiny)
  - lyrics: Sabahattin Ali
  - music: Ahmet Kaya
3. "Suskun" (Taciturn)
  - lyrics: Ahmed Arif
  - music: Ahmet Kaya
4. "Geçmiyor Günler" (The Days Aren't Passing)
  - lyrics: Sabahattin Ali
  - music: Ahmet Kaya
5. "Hasretinden Prangalar Eskittim"
  - lyrics: Ahmed Arif
  - music: Ahmet Kaya
6. "Kız Kaçıran" (Girl Snatcher)
  - lyrics: Sabahattin Ali
  - music: Ahmet Kaya
7. "Şahin Gibi" (Like a Falcon)
  - lyrics: Karacaoğlan
  - music: Ahmet Kaya
8. "Aynı Daldaydık" (We were on the Same Branch)
  - lyrics: Nazım Hikmet
  - music: Ahmet Kaya
9. "Maviye Çalar Gözlerin" (Your Eyes Are Tinged with Blue)
  - lyrics: Ahmed Arif
  - music: Ahmet Kaya
10. "Bırak Beni" (Leave Me)
  - lyrics: A. Damar
  - music: Ahmet Kaya
11. "Bizim Hikayemiz" (Our Story)
  - lyrics and music: Ahmet Kaya
12. "Karanlıkta" (In the Darkness)
  - lyrics and music: Ahmet Kaya
13. "Kurtuluş Savaşı Destanı" (Epic of the War of Liberation)
  - lyrics and music: anonymous
14. "Uğurlar Ola" (Goodbye)
  - lyrics: Mehmet Akif Ersoy
  - music: Ahmet Kaya
