= Yeşilyayla, Çelikhan =

Village in Adıyaman Province, Turkey

Yeşilyayla
- Village
- Location within Turkey
- Coordinates: 38.051°N 38.340°E
- Country: Turkey
- Province: Adıyaman
- District: Çelikhan
- Population (2021): 86
- Time zone: UTC+3 (TRT)

Yeşilyayla (Kurdish: Gov) is a village in the Çelikhan District, Adıyaman Province, Turkey. The village is populated by Kurds of the Reşwan tribe and had a population of 86 in 2021.

The hamlet of Eskiköy is attached to Yeşilyayla.
