= Çampınar, Çelikhan =

Village in Adıyaman Province, Turkey

Çampınar
- Village
- Location within Turkey
- Coordinates: 38.119°N 38.219°E
- Country: Turkey
- Province: Adıyaman
- District: Çelikhan
- Population (2021): 62
- Time zone: UTC+3 (TRT)

Çampınar (Kurdish: Pîrhemzikan) is a village in the Çelikhan District, Adıyaman Province, Turkey. The village is populated by Kurds of the Cêlikan tribe and had a population of 62 in 2021.

The hamlet of Değirmenbaşı is attached to the village.
