= Fatih, Çelikhan =

Village in Adıyaman Province, Turkey

Fatih
- Village
- Location within Turkey
- Coordinates: 38.031°N 38.387°E
- Country: Turkey
- Province: Adıyaman
- District: Çelikhan
- Population (2021): 117
- Time zone: UTC+3 (TRT)

Fatih (Kurdish: Fatîh) is a village in the Çelikhan District of Adıyaman Province in Turkey. The village is populated by Kurds of the Reşwan tribe and had a population of 117 in 2021.
