= Bozgedik, Çelikhan =

Village in Adıyaman Province, Turkey

Bozgedik
- Village
- Location within Turkey
- Coordinates: 38.087°N 38.286°E
- Country: Turkey
- Province: Adıyaman
- District: Çelikhan
- Population (2021): 83
- Time zone: UTC+3 (TRT)

Bozgedik (Kurdish: Qoltik) is a village in the Çelikhan District, Adıyaman Province, Turkey. The village is populated by Kurds of the Cêlikan tribe and had a population of 83 in 2021.

The hamlets of Düzağaç and Karaman are attached to the village.
