= Şerefhan, Çelikhan =

Village in Adıyaman Province, Turkey

Şerefhan
- Village
- Location within Turkey
- Coordinates: 38.087°N 38.332°E
- Country: Turkey
- Province: Adıyaman
- District: Çelikhan
- Population (2021): 324
- Time zone: UTC+3 (TRT)

Şerefhan, formerly Taşdamlar, Kurdish: Şerefxan) is a village in the Çelikhan District, Adıyaman Province, Turkey. The village is populated by Kurds of the Reşwan tribe and had a population of 324 in 2021.

The hamlets of Çat, Esen, Havuzbaşı and İncesu are attached to Şerefhan.
