= Aksu, Çelikhan =

Village in Adıyaman Province, Turkey

Aksu
- Village
- Location within Turkey
- Coordinates: 37.984°N 38.327°E
- Country: Turkey
- Province: Adıyaman
- District: Çelikhan
- Population (2021): 316
- Time zone: UTC+3 (TRT)

Aksu (Kurdish: Avêspî) is a village in the Çelikhan District, Adıyaman Province, Turkey. The village is populated by Kurds of the Reşwan tribe and had a population of 316 in 2021.
