= Karaçayır, Çelikhan =

Village in Adıyaman Province, Turkey

Karaçayır
- Village
- Location within Turkey
- Coordinates: 38.045°N 38.406°E
- Country: Turkey
- Province: Adıyaman
- District: Çelikhan
- Population (2021): 82
- Time zone: UTC+3 (TRT)

Karaçayır (Kurdish: Xidiran) is a village in the Çelikhan District, Adıyaman Province, Turkey. It is populated by Kurds of the Reşwan tribe and had a population of 82 in 2021.
