= Çelikhan =

- Municipality
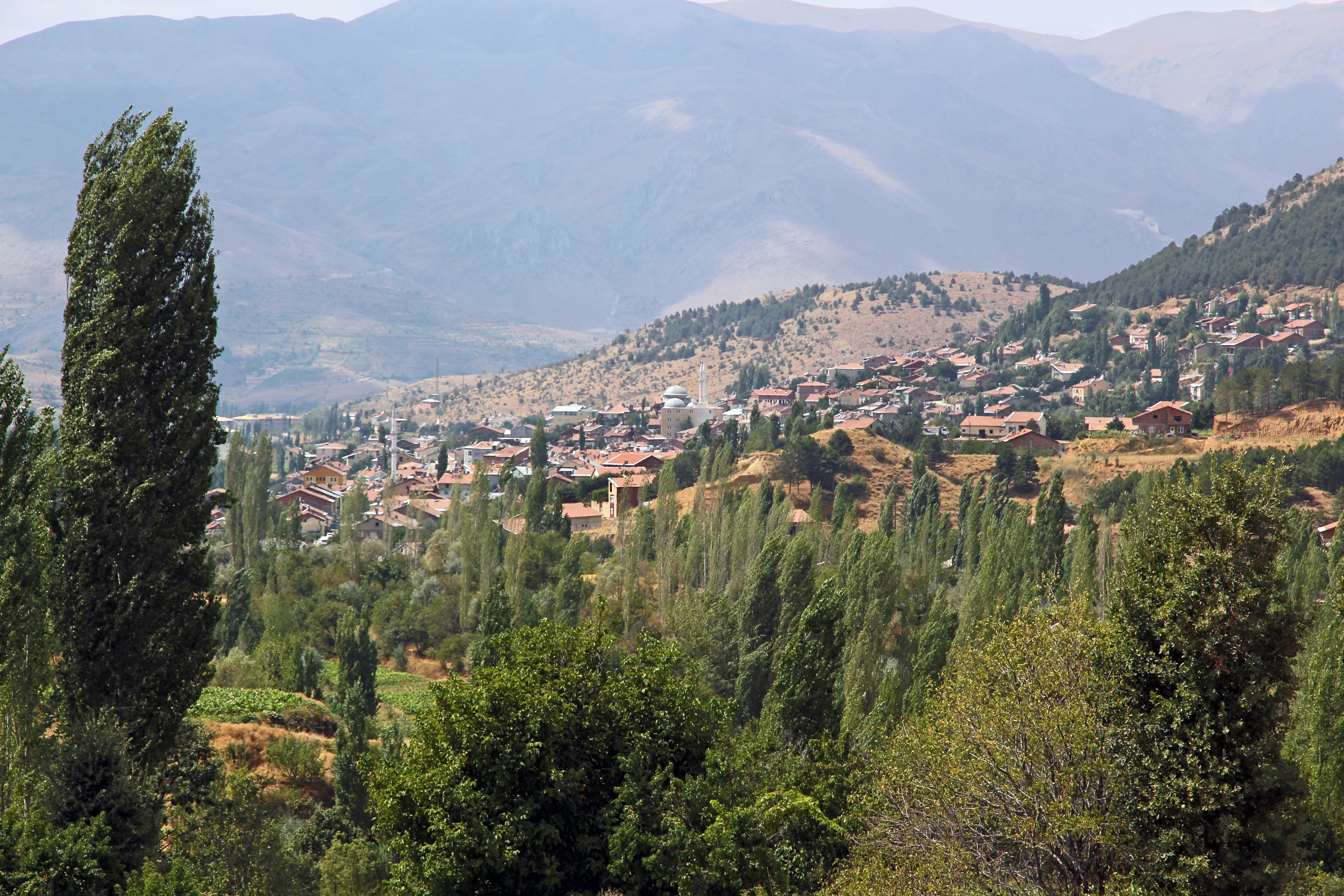

- Location within Turkey
- Coordinates: 38°02′05″N 38°14′45″E
- Country: Turkey
- Province: Adıyaman
- District: Çelikhan

Government
  - Mayor: Mahmut Şahin (DEVA)
- Population (2021): 8,473
- Time zone: UTC+3 (TRT)
- Postal code: 02600
- Website: www.celikhan.bel.tr

Çelikhan (Kurdish: Komaşir) is a town of Adıyaman Province, Turkey. It is the seat of Çelikhan District. The town is mostly populated by Kurds of the Reşwan tribe and had a population of 8,473 in 2021.
