= Mutlu, Çelikhan =

Village in Adıyaman Province, Turkey

Mutlu
- Village
- Location within Turkey
- Coordinates: 38.048°N 38.400°E
- Country: Turkey
- Province: Adıyaman
- District: Çelikhan
- Population (2021): 295
- Time zone: UTC+3 (TRT)

Mutlu (Kurdish: Şirfîn) is a village in the Çelikhan District, Adıyaman Province, Turkey. The village is populated by Kurds of the Cêlikan and Reşwan tribes and had a population of 295 in 2021.

The hamlets of Çubuklu and Harman are attached to the village.
