= Yeşiltepe, Çelikhan =

Village in Adıyaman Province, Turkey

Yeşiltepe
- Village
- Location within Turkey
- Coordinates: 37.969°N 38.397°E
- Country: Turkey
- Province: Adıyaman
- District: Çelikhan
- Population (2021): 420
- Time zone: UTC+3 (TRT)

Yeşiltepe (Kurdish: Kela) is a village in the Çelikhan District, Adıyaman Province, Turkey. The village is populated by Kurds of the Reşwan tribe and had a population of 420 in 2021.
