= Yağızatlı, Çelikhan =

Village in Adıyaman Province, Turkey

Yağızatlı
- Village
- Location within Turkey
- Coordinates: 37.992°N 38.399°E
- Country: Turkey
- Province: Adıyaman
- District: Çelikhan
- Population (2021): 116
- Time zone: UTC+3 (TRT)

Yağızatlı (Kurdish: Bistikan) is a village in the Çelikhan District, Adıyaman Province, Turkey. The village had a population of Kurds of the Reşwan tribe and had a population of 116 in 2021.
