= Castros (Spain) =

Fortified settlement found in northern Spain

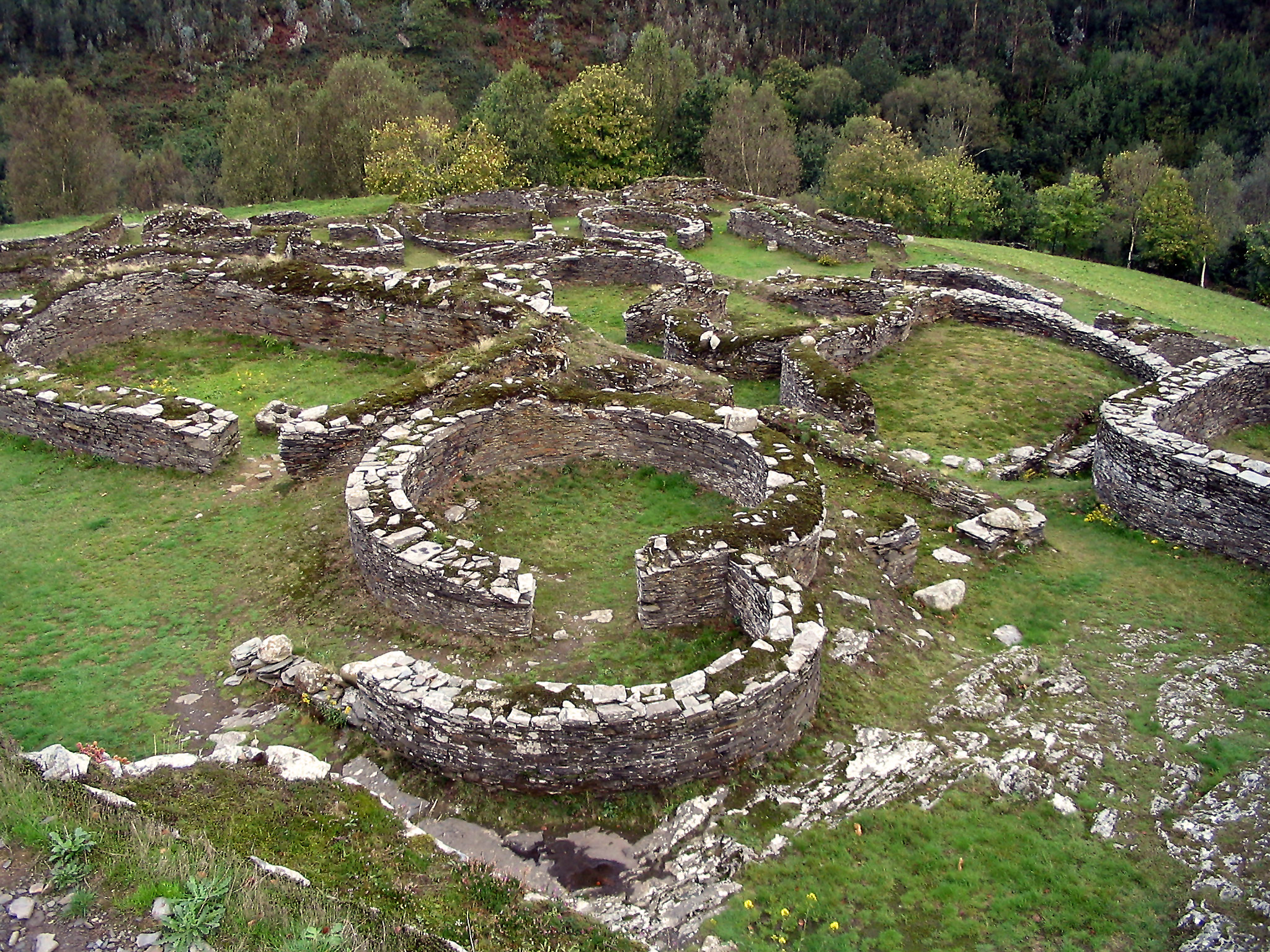
Ruins of the houses of the Castro of Coaña, next to Coaña (Asturias).

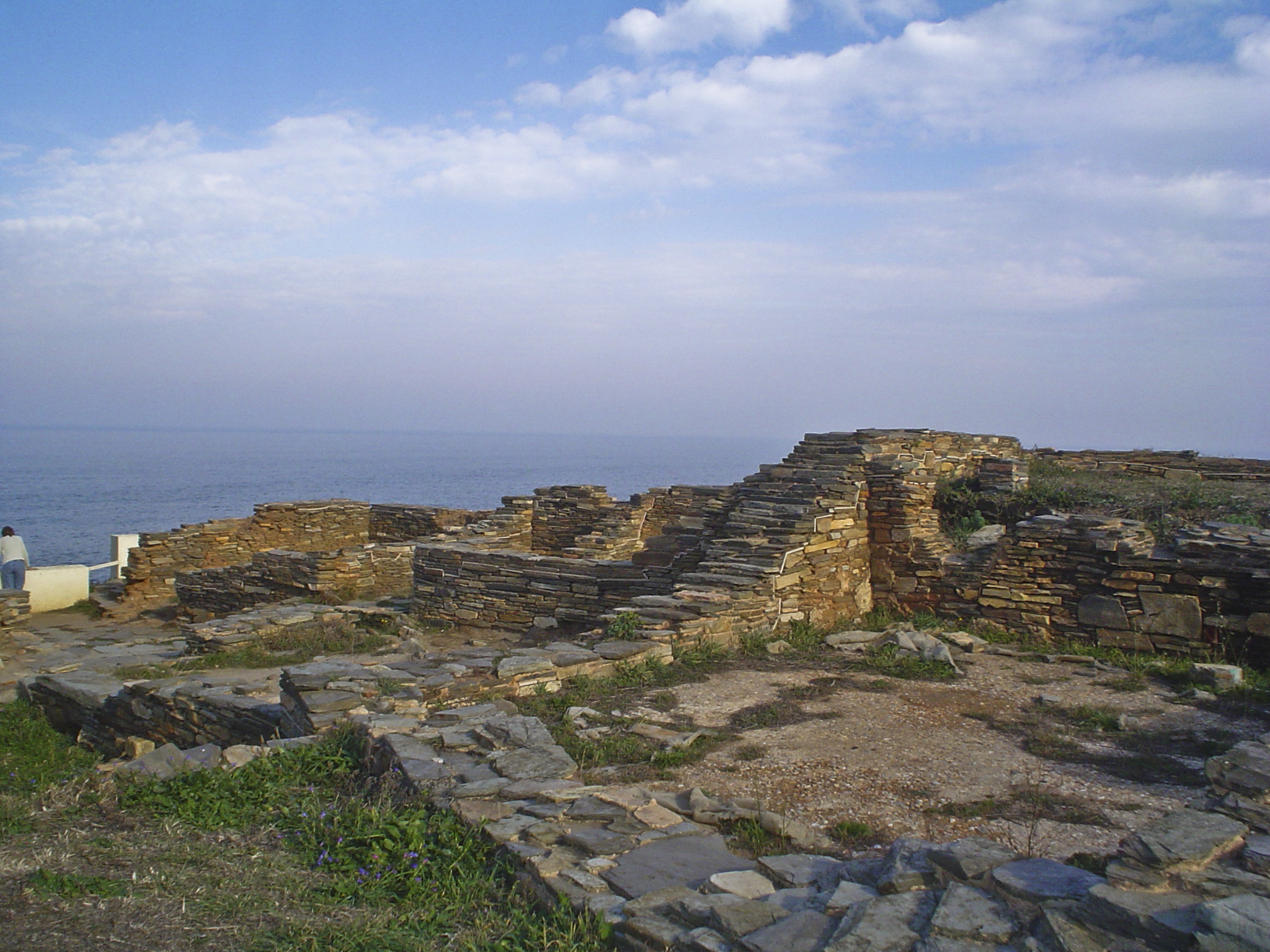
Castro of Fazouro, Foz, (Galicia).

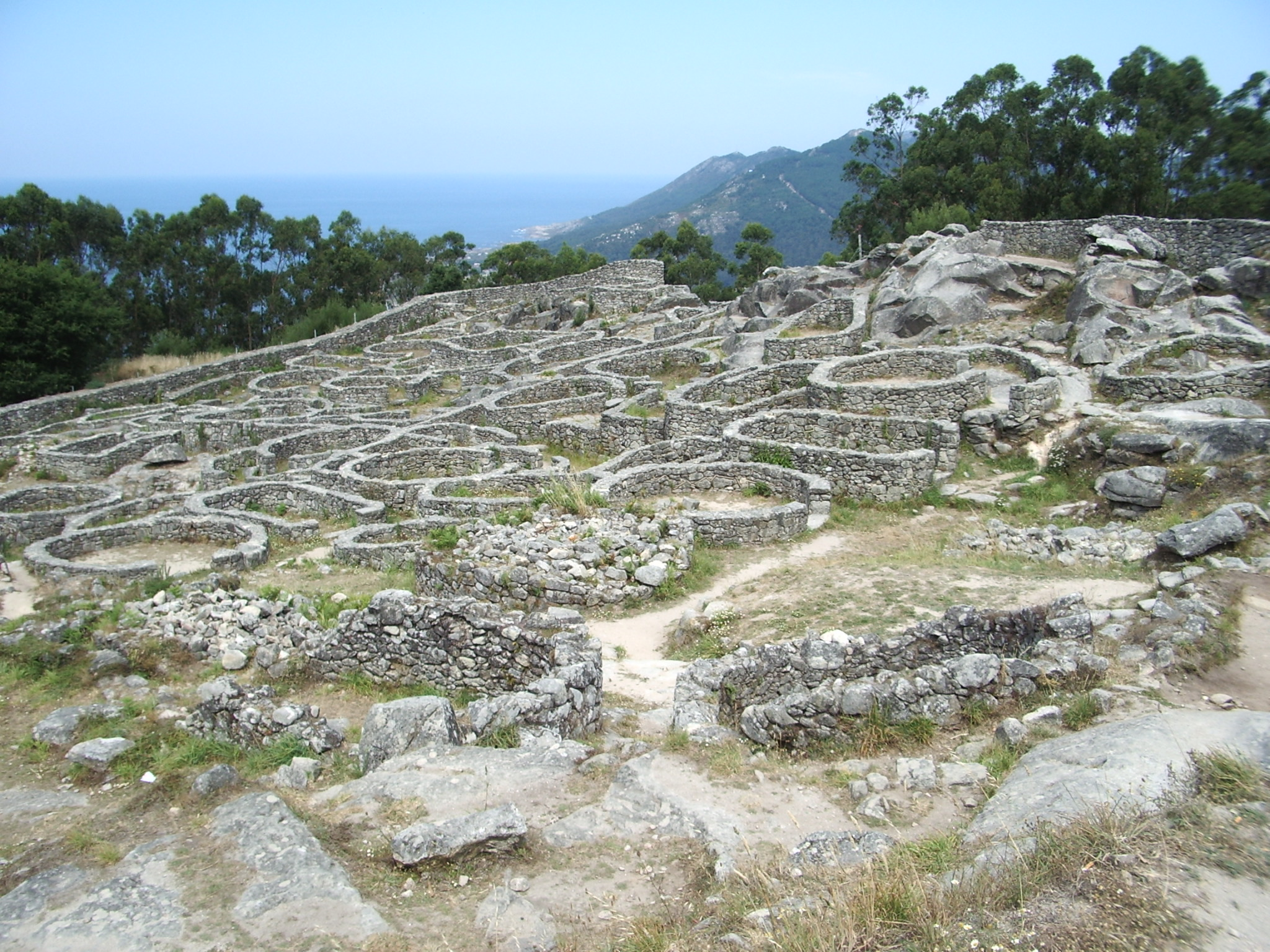
View of the northern side of the Castro of Santa Tegra, in the Mount of Santa Tegra, (municipality of A Guarda, Galicia).

A castro is a fortified settlement, usually pre-Roman, some from late Bronze Age and Iron Age, associated with Celtic culture. These are frequently found in Northern Spain, particularly in Asturias, Galicia, Cantabria, Basque Country and the province of Ávila, with the Castro culture and on the plateau with Las Cogotas culture.

The word castro comes from the Latin castrum, which means "hill fort".

== Castros of the Castro culture ==
The castro is a fortified village that began to be inhabited from the 6th century BC, lacking streets of right angles and full of construction almost always circular. The oldest houses were mostly of straw-mud and the latest masonry. Construction of individual homes and rooms were often unique. The roof was made of branches and mud and supported by wooden poles or beams. These are located in naturally protected areas (heights, riots rivers, small peninsulas), close to water sources and arable land and on the border between these and higher areas of grazing.

The castros were protected by one or more pits, parapets and walls that bordered the inhabited precinct, which may have in its accesses a torreón, which controlled the entryways to itself or another strategic location.

In times of conflict, the people who lived in open field moved to these strategically located buildings to ensure their safety. The buildings could also have other purposes such as control of territory, vigilance of crops, etc.

Its situation on the territory compared to other castros suggests that there was a definite strategy when choosing its location, allowing the communication by signals between them as a defensive network.

The maximum flowering time was between the 4th and 2nd centuries BC and show greater business contact with the outside of the south than the north, and the coastal than the inland. Some historians argue that in the first mid-1st century BC there was a multiplication of castros (either for population growth or for other reasons). At the end of the century, coinciding with the final phase of the Roman conquest, some with signs of destruction of the walls and in some cases immediate reoccupation.

=== Types of castros ===
==== Inland castros ====
These are the most common and characteristic. These are located on hills or prominent elevations, but rarely in high summits. They are circular or oval and have one or more walls. An example is the castro of Coaña (Asturias).

==== Mountain castros ====
Located in high mountainous areas, are located on the slopes and are oval, with artificial pits on the upper side and walls or embankments into the valley. Dating back to Roman times and are linked to mining. Two examples include Vilar in the Sierra de Caurel and Xegunde in Fonsagrada (Lugo).

==== Coastal castros ====
Are of varied plant, but usually round or oval, adapting to the terrain. The natural defenses of the sea are complemented by walls and moats into the inland. These are very abundant and an example are the Baroña in the Sierra of Barbanza.

=== Urbanism of the castros ===
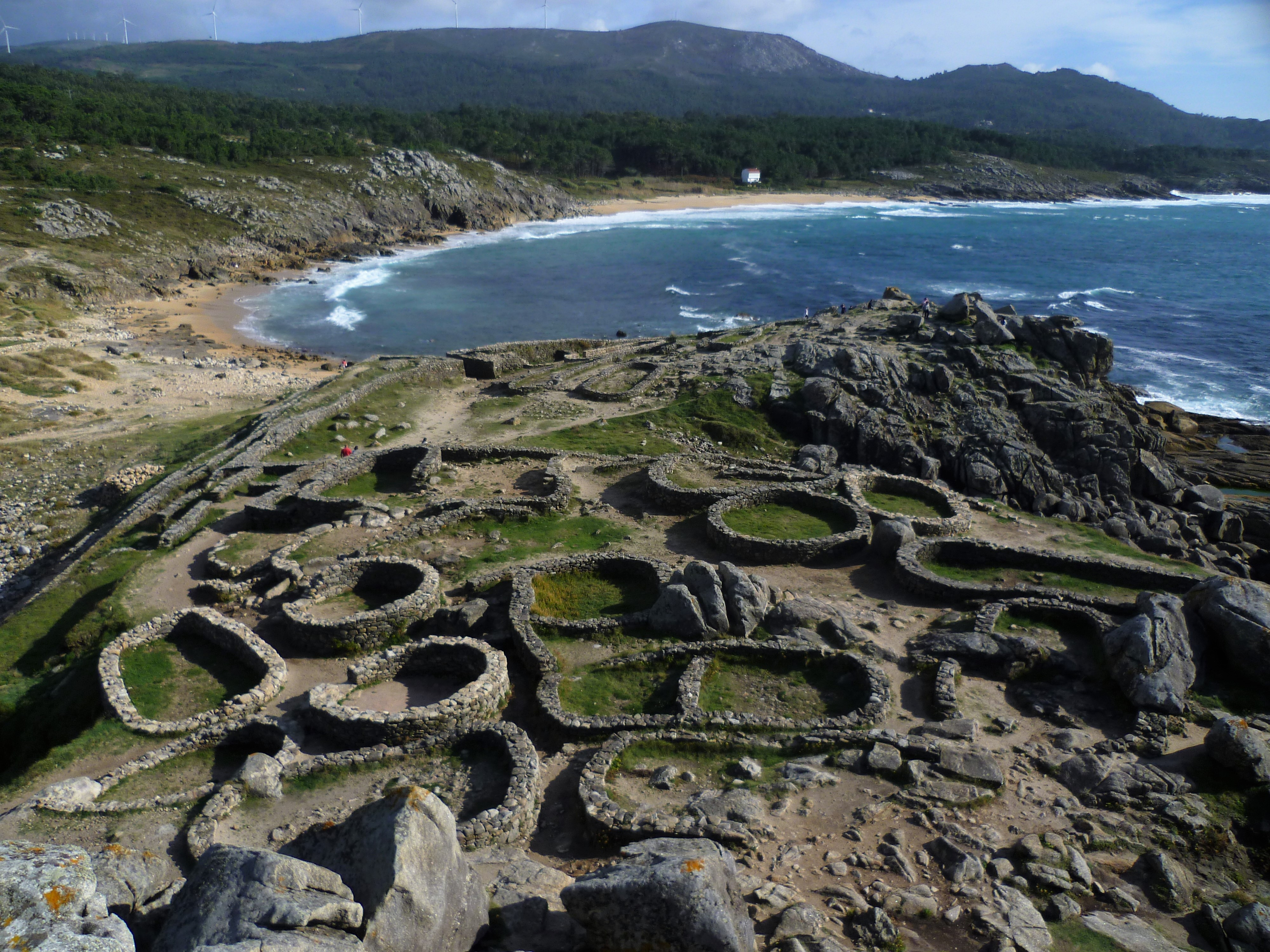
Castro of Baroña, in Galicia.

The Castro villages tend to be constructed in cleared hills, rocky headlands or peninsulas that stretch into the sea, which provides visibility, defense and the contour domain. The place of settlement is given also in terms of natural resources exploited by the residents. The castros have an upper enclosure, the "croa" and a series of terraces laid down where are the buildings. Each of these sections may be limited by walls, parapets or pits. Sometimes there is a kind of additions, the antecastros, which is also surrounded by walls but do not harbor houses, so it is assumed that these were intended for animals or orchards.

The castros tend to have a single entrance, which also serves to prevent passage. In some cases is a simple thickening of the tops of the walls, in others, a panel of the wall surpasses the other, forming a narrow corridor. It is assumed that they closed with wooden doors.

The defenses of the castros do not seem to meet war needs, but of prestige and symbolic boundaries of the inhabited space. In fact, few weapons were found. In addition to natural defenses, there are structures of three types:

- Ramparts. Terrain variations formed by earth and stone, which can be natural. These are the basis of the defenses and usually comes from the rubble of the foundational works in the interior.
- Parapets. Artificial elevation of the terrain in the most vulnerable points (entrances and flat areas).
- Trenches. Gabias long and deep, usually associated with the parapets, which can be dug into soil or rock.
- Walls. Masonry defenses of varied types, such as two parallel walls of stone with stone fill. From the inside up to them by wooden stairs, recessed slabs, ramps or rocks. There may be defensive towers at the accesses to the doors. These are later elements.

The most common is the absence of urban organization. In the 1st century appear clusters of buildings ("neighborhoods"), consisting of several buildings surrounded by a wall with one opening facing the street. This arrangement is common in large towns, and in more modest towns like Castro do Vieito. These may be households in which a building would be housing and the other, silos and warehouses. The houses do not share dividing walls, but are separated from the others. It is not known whether this is a reflection of the idiosyncrasies of this culture or because of the difficulty to do in a circular building. The houses also do not have windows.

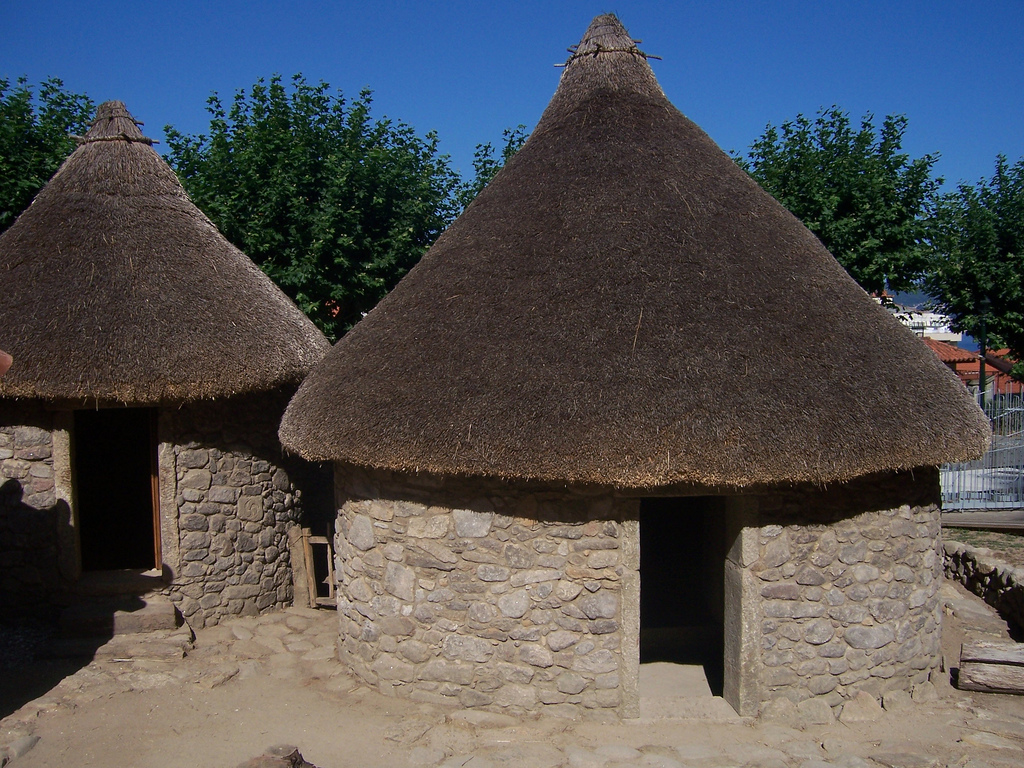
Rebuilt house in the Celtic castro of Vigo (Galicia).

The floor of the houses was of mud trod. Prior to the 2nd-3rd century BC, the walls were usually built of adobe, with a central pole. Subsequently, it used masonry more or less in horizontal rows (or polygonal, in some cases). The covers were made of branches covered with mud and reinforced by weights or subsequent of tiles. From the 1st century and due to Roman influence, become more usually square or rectangular. The essential element of a house is the home, that in the change of era was located at the center and was made of slate or clay and by the end of the 1st century it shifted to one side and was, in some cases, with shingles.

It is suspected that some large buildings, where a stone bench runs along the wall and in which are not remains of room, could have been room enclosures. It has also ceramic and pottery kilns, usually next to the exits or outside.

== See also ==
- List of castros in Asturias
- List of castros in Galicia
- List of castros in Cantabria
- List of castros in Basque Country
- List of castros in the Province of Ávila
- Hill fort
- Castro culture
- Oppidum
- Gaztelu zahar
