= Votive relief of Jupiter Dolichenus =

Ancient religious votive relief sculpture

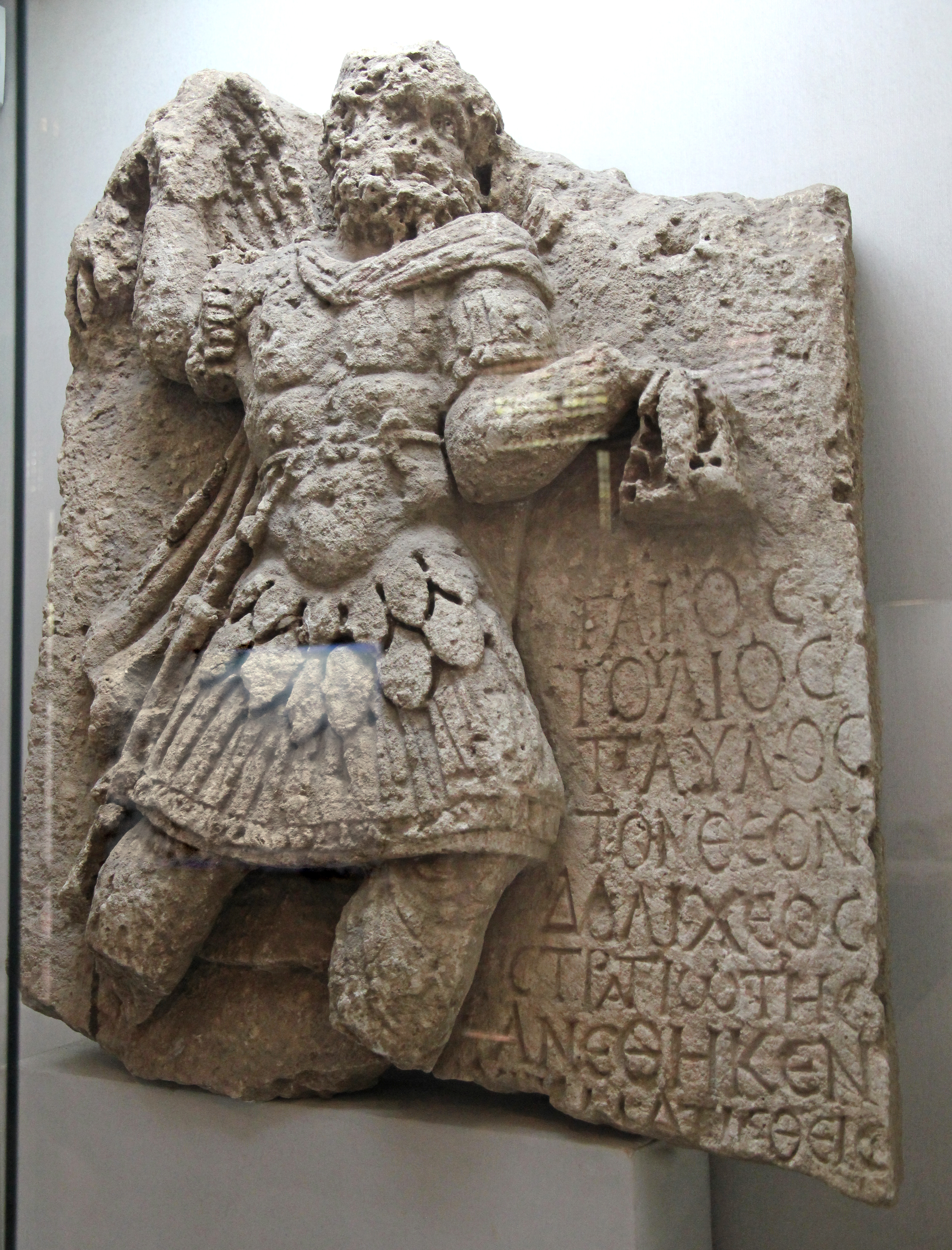
Votive relief in the Adıyaman Museum

The Votive relief of Jupiter Dolichenus was discovered in the ancient city of Perrhe in the kingdom of Commagene in the southeast of modern Turkey. It is now displayed in the Adıyaman Archaeological Museum.

== Discovery ==
The votive relief was discovered in the vast necropolis of the city of Perrhe - today the suburb of Pirin in the provincial capital of Adiyaman. During excavation and cleaning work by the Museum of Adiyaman in 2001 under the leadership of its director, Fehmi Erarslan, the relief was revealed in secondary use as the covering for a late antique grave. Along with Samosata, Marasch and Doliche, Perrhe was one of the core cities of the Kingdom of Commagene. Thus, the relief of Jupiter Dolichenus is the only one thus far known, which has been found in the immediate area of the god's original worship. While images of him spread throughout the whole Roman Empire and numerous examples have been found in Western Europe, they are rare in Asia Minor and Syria. As part of a project of the Forstellungstelle Asia Minor of the University of Münster, the relief was discussed by Michael Blömer (relief) and Margherita Facella (inscription).

== Depiction ==
The stele is made of light yellow local limestone and measures 0.81 m high and 0.63 m wide. The base is 11 cm deep, the greatest projection of the relief is 12 cm. At left is the god and at right, under his arm is an eight-line inscription. A large part of the relief is lost, including the point of the god's hat and both hands, while of the legs only the upper thighs survive. This bottom break runs through the final line of the inscription. The relief is very deep, such that parts of the figure like the head and the arms are nearly in the round. The god is shown in a typical pose of Jupiter Dolichenus, with his right arm raised and his left arm bent. There was a thunderbolt held in his left hand, but only the lower part still survives. The labrys usually found in the right hand is completely lost. Jupiter is depicted with a beard and long hair, both of which are depicted in detail with individual spiral locks. Despite the serious damage to the face, the deep-set eyes with drilled pupils can still be made out. On top of his head, he wears a Phrygian cap. Otherwise he is dressed in a military outfit. On his upper body, he wears a Roman muscle cuirass over his tunic, which is held in place by flat leather straps over his shoulders and a Cingulum militare around his midriff. Over his hips he wears the Pteruges, with deep furrows in between them. Over his cuirass the god wears a paludamentum, which is gathered over his right shoulder and hangs down from his left shoulder such that it is visible in the background behind him. A small bandolier holds a sword on his right hand side. The god wears tights on his legs. Above the right shoulder of the figure, behind the raised arm, the remains of an eagle are visible. The end of the left wing and the tail feathers are relatively clear.

The relief may have been complete with the common, right-facing bull, on which the god would have stood, as is common in the iconography of images of Jupiter Dolichenus. The tights the god wears are remarkable, as is the head covering. Both were considered "oriental" attributes by the Romans and thus emphasised his supposed birthplace. In other images from northern Syria and Asia Minor, there are no other cases of the god depicted wearing tights, although they were subsequently an attribute of the god, especially in Roman depictions.

== Inscription ==
The dedicatory inscription is in the right, lower floor of the field, between the left leg and the left arm. It is eight lines long, with letters deeply carved into the stone. The letters get smaller lower down, which indicates that the stonemason had issues fitting the text in the available space. The inscription says:

Γάϊος ᾿Ιούλιος Παῦλος τὸν θὲον Δολίχεος στρατιώτης ἀνέθηκεν χ[ρ]ηματισθείς
Gaius Iulius Paulus, soldier, dedicated [this] to the god of Doliche, after receiving an oracular response.

Thus the inscription supplies the name of the dedicant, his position, and the reason for his dedication. The donor from Doliche was a soldier and his name indicates that he was a Roman citizen. Blömer and Facella suggest that one of his ancestors received citizenship and adopted the nomen Julius. This nomen was widespread in North Syria and Commagene and indicates either the emperor who was reigning at the time of the receipt of citizenship or the governor of the province who was responsible for the award.

It is not stated which legion of the army that Gaius Julius Paulus belonged to. It is known that towards the end of the 2nd century AD, soldiers of the Legio IV Scythica were carrying out construction work in Commagene and that, around the same time, the Legio XVI Flavia Firma was tasked with the construction of the Chabinas bridge. But whether Paulus came to Perrhe as a member of one of these legiones or belonged to another vexillatio stationed in the area, cannot be determined. This is particularly the case because the original location of the stele is unclear.

The letterforms indicate that the inscription dates to the period between the late 2nd century AD and the beginning of the 3rd century AD.

== Bibliography ==
- Michael Blömer, Margherita Facella: "Ein Weihrelief für Iupiter Dolichenus aus der Nekropole von Perrhe." In: Engelbert Winter (ed.): ΠΑΤΡΙΣ ΠΑΝΤΡΟΦΟΣ ΚΟΜΜΑΓΗΝΗ. Neue Funde und Forschungen zwischen Taurus und Euphrat (= Asia Minor Studien. Volume 60). Dr. Rudolf Habelt GmbH, Bonn 2008, ISBN 978-3-7749-3517-4, pp. 189–200.
