= Antiochia ad Taurum =

Hellenistic city in ancient Syria

Coordinates: 37°05′N 37°24′E

Antiochia ad Taurum (lit. 'Antiochia at Taurus') (Ancient Greek: Ἀντιόχεια τοῦ Ταύρου; lit. "Antiochia of Taurus") was a Hellenistic city in ancient Syria east of Mount Amanus of the Taurus mountain range. Later identified as 'ad Taurum montem' (lit. 'at Mount Taurus') in the Commagene province of Syria.

== Historical geography ==
Antiochia ad Taurum was located to the east of Mount Amanus, and in the Second Temple period, Jewish authors seeking to establish with greater precision the geographical borders of the Promised Land, began to construe Mount Hor as a reference to the Amanus range of the Taurus Mountains, which marked the northern limit of the Syrian plain.

Most modern scholars locate Antiochia ad Taurum at or near Gaziantep (formerly called Aïntab) in the westernmost part of present-day Turkey's Southeastern Anatolia Region, although past scholars tried to associate it with Aleppo (Arabic name Halab), Syria. It has also been identified with Perrhe near Adıyaman.

Locating Antiochia ad Taurum at or near (Gaziantep, Turkey), the city lies in the Islahiye valley which connects the lower Orontes valley to the southern piedmont of the central Taurus Mountains. During the Bronze Age, the region belonged to the Inner Syrian cultural context, and held a highly strategic significance, over the course of time, for the connections between Upper Mesopotamian and Levantine lowlands on the one hand and the Anatolian highlands on the other.

== Numismatics ==
Coins were minted at Antiochia ad Taurum.

== History of Christianity ==
During the Roman Period (1st century CE), Antiochia ad Taurum was located within the Roman provinces of Antiochia or Cilicia et Syria, and excluded from Paul's missionary journeys. Antiochia ad Taurum was eventually Christianized and formed a bishopric see as "the episcopal city of Commagene in Syria with the Euphrates river near its border."

== See also ==
- List of ancient Greek cities
