= Runtiya =

Luwian god of the hunt

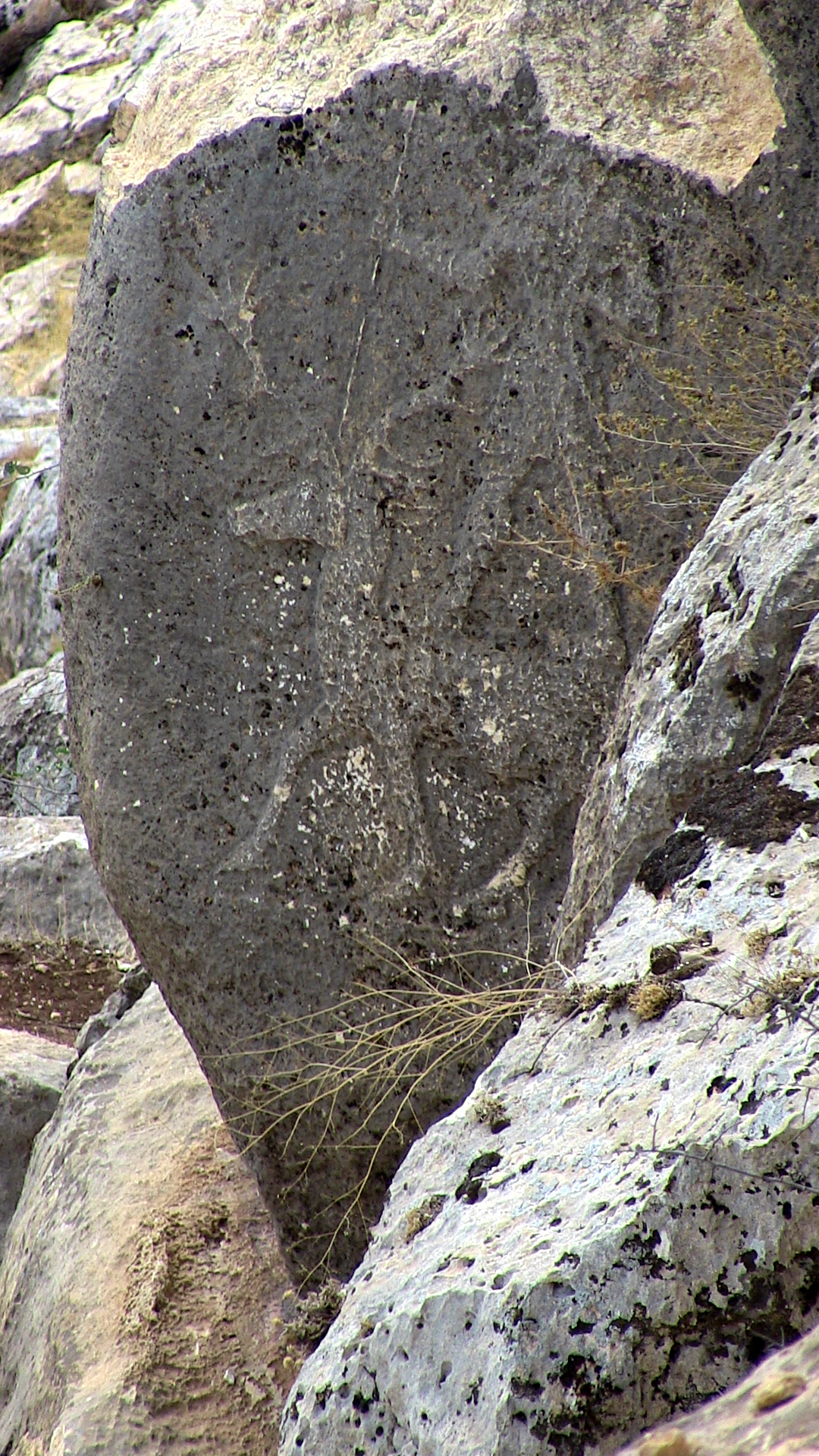
Runtiya, on the Karasu relief

Runtiya was the Luwian god of the hunt, who had a close connection with deer. He was among the most important gods of the Luwians.

== Name ==
The name was written in the Luwian cuneiform of the Bronze Age as 𒀭𒆗𒄿𒀀 ^{D}LAMMA-ya, which can be read as *Runtiya or *Kruntiya. In Hieroglyphic Luwian of the Iron Age, he was named "Runtiya" and his name was generally written with the image of a deer or antlers, as (DEUS) CERVUS ("God deer").

The name is possibly derived from a word for "horn" or "antler", but all the etymologies which have been proposed to date are problematic. The relationship between Runtiya and the Kurunta is disputed. Some scholars argue that the two gods are identical and reconstruct an older Luwian form of the name, *Krunti(ya)-; others suggest that there was a pre-Indo-European Anatolian divinity which the Luwian Runtiya and the Hittite Kurunta had developed.

Runtiya was often invoked in personal names: the oldest example derives the 18th century BC Kültepe, where a man called Ruwa(n)tia and another called Ru(n)tia are attested. The latest attested names are Hellenistic examples from Cilicia: Rondas (Ρωνδας), Rozarmas (Ρωζαρμας; Luwian: *Runt-zalma- "Runtiya is safety") and Rondbies (Ρωνδβιης; Luwian: Runt(a)-piya- "Runtiya-Gift").

== Role ==
During the Bronze Age, he was the treated as a protective deity, the son of the Sun god Tiwaz and the goddess Kamrušepa. His partner was "Lady Ala." The pair were invoked along with various mountains and rivers, such as ^{ḪUR.SAG}Šarpa (Arısama Dağı near Emirgazi). Runtiya's epithet šarlaimi ("raised") was also the name of a mountain god. In the Neo-Hittite period, Runtiya and Ala-Kubaba shared a sanctuary at Ancoz.

=== Meadow god ===
Runtiya was closely linked with the deer and his Iron Age epithets Imralli and Imrassi ("The meadow") indicate his connection to hunting. According to Iron Age evidence, he received sacrifices of gazelles and rewarded the worshipper for this with success in the hunt.

Divinities are also known from the Bronze Age which were referred to with the Luwian word im(ma)ra- ("field, meadow") and are likely to be linked to this aspect of Runtiya. Thus, in the cult of the Hittite city of Ḫubišna, the divinity ^{D}Imralli was named immediately before ^{D}LAMMA šarlaimi and in the cult of Ištanuwa, ^{D}Immaršia is listed immediately after the "Great Protective God" (^{d}LAMMA GAL). Another relevant Luwian deity was ^{D}Immarni.

The Carian god Imbramos or Imbrasos (Ἴμβρασος) which Stephanus of Byzantium identified with Hermes, probably belongs to this group of deities as well.

In the Luwian-Phoenician Karatepe Bilingual Runtiya is identified with Resheph (ršp ṣprm "Rašap of the he-goats" or "Rašap of the birds").

== Depiction ==
According to a Hittite description of a statuette of the Protective God, he was depicted as a man standing on a deer, with a bow in his right hand and eagle and hares in his left hand. Iron Age depictions of Runtiya, like the Karasu relief show him as a beardless god standing on a deer, with a peaked cap and a bow over his shoulder.

== Subsequent history ==
It is generally agreed that Runtiya lived on in the cult of Hermes at Korykos in Rough Cilica, especially since the lists of priests of the sanctuary in the nearby grottos of Cennet and Cehennem frequently include Ro(nd)- as part of their personal names.

== Bibliography ==
- Volkert Haas: Geschichte der hethitischen Religion (= Handbuch der Orientalistik. Volume 1.15). Brill, Leiden 1994, ISBN 978-9-004-09799-5.
- Manfred Hutter: "Aspects in Luwian Religion." In H. Craig Melchert (ed.): The Luwians (= Handbuch der Orientalistik. Volume 1.68). Brill, Leiden 2003, ISBN 90-04-13009-8. pp. 211–280.
