= Adıyaman Archaeological Museum =

Archaeological museum in Turkey

- Adıyaman Müzesi
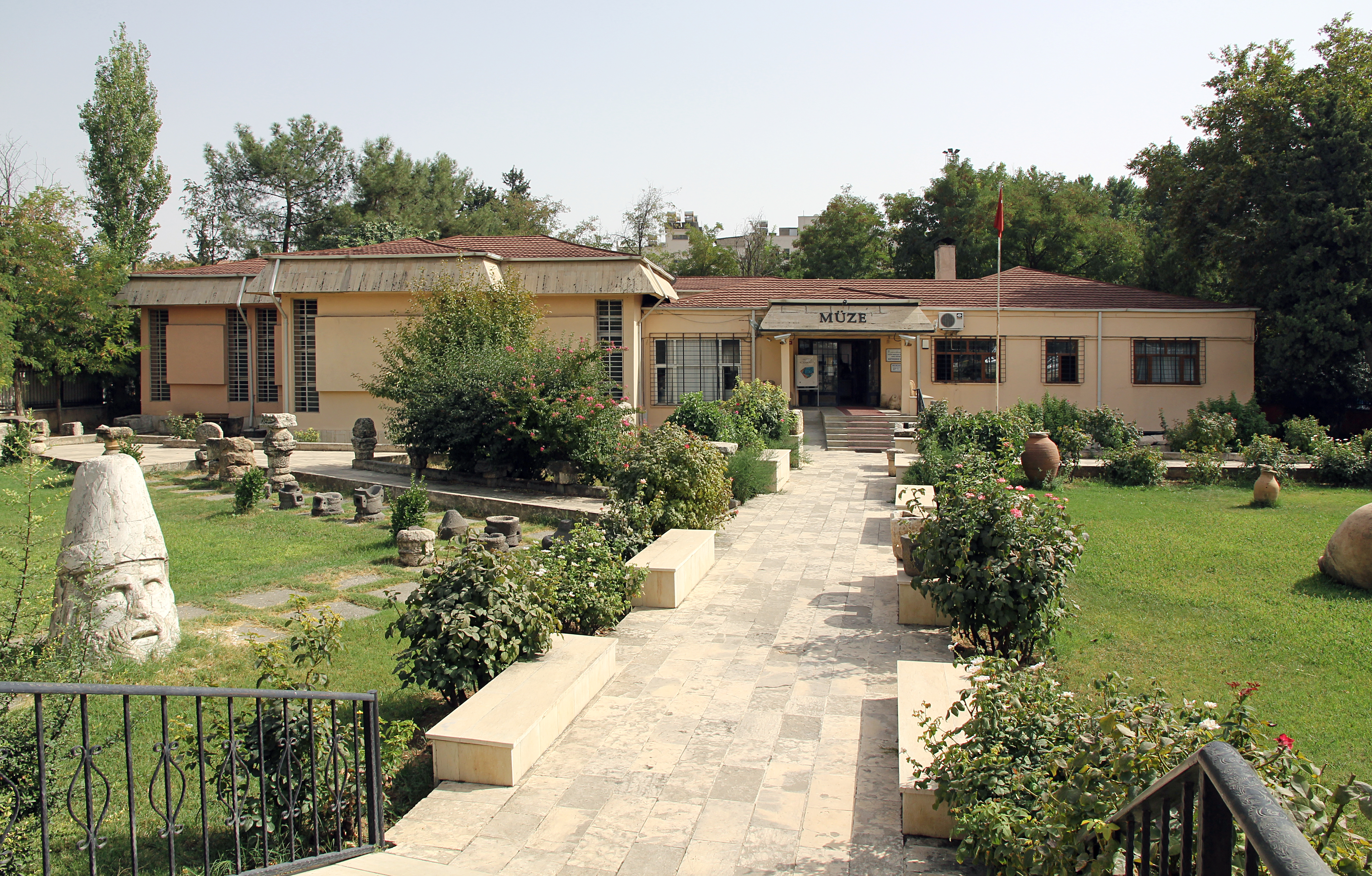
- Adıyaman Archaeological Museum.

- Location of the museum in turkey.
- Established: 1982; 44 years ago
- Location: Adıyaman, Turkey
- Coordinates: 37°45′47″N 38°16′41″E
- Type: Archaeological
- Visitors: around 30,000 (2010)
- Director: Fehmi Erarslan,

Adıyaman Archaeological Museum (Turkish: Turkish: Adıyaman Müzesi) is an archaeology museum in Adıyaman, southeastern Turkey. It is located at the corner of Atatürk Boulevard and Cumhuriyet Avenue in the heart of the city. The museum displays archaeological finds from the area around the city, as well as from rescue excavations carried out in the course of the Southeastern Anatolia Project.

== History ==
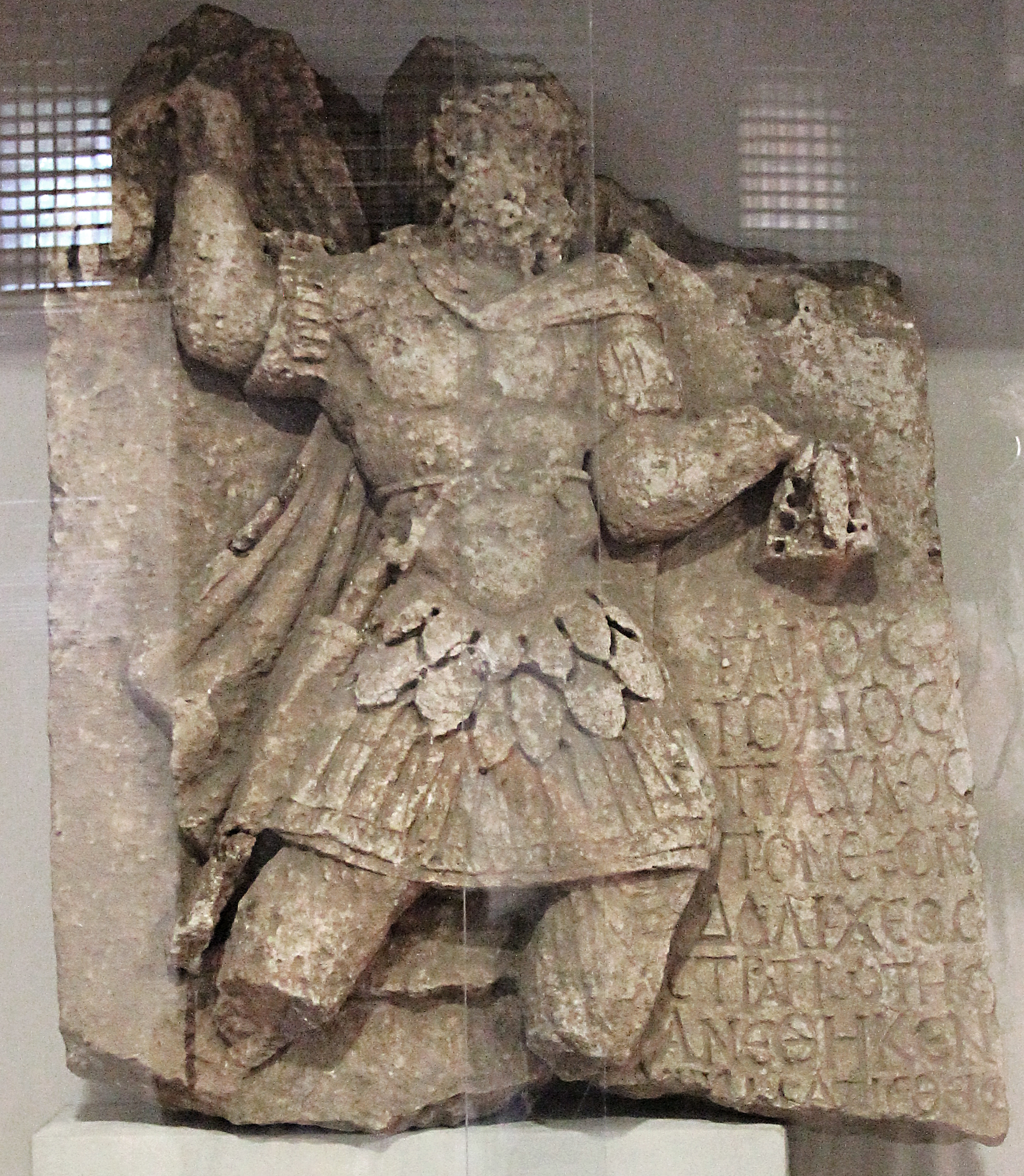
Votive relief of Jupiter Dolichenus from the necropolis of Perrhe.

When planning began on the Southeastern Anatolia Project at the end of the 1970s, rescue excavations were initiated at many sites in the Euphrates basin around Adıyaman, since many archaeological find spots were threatened by the planned construction of hydroelectric dams. From 1978 on, finds from these excavations were stored in the buildings of the city library. The present museum building was completed in 1982, at which point Emin Yener became its first director. The museum participated in the rescue excavations of the tumult of Levzin and Sofraz and of Haraba, as well as the excavations of the Commagenian city of Perrhe, located within the modern city of Adıyaman. Since 2008, they have been participating in the Research Centre for Asia Minor in collaboration with Margherita Facella of Pisa and Charles Crowther of Oxford in order to record and process the inscriptions stored in the museum.

== Exhibition buildings ==
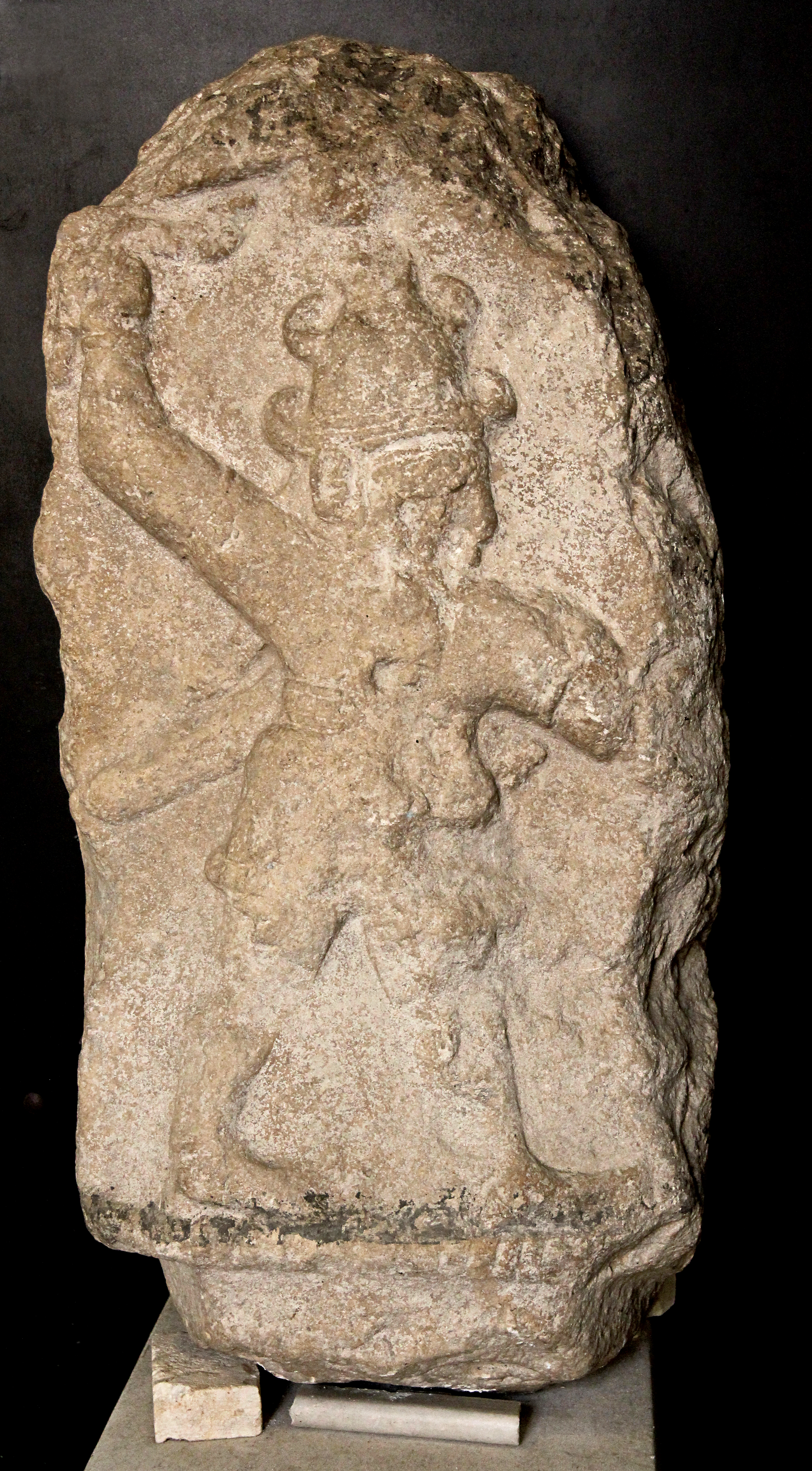
Stela of the Hittite weather god.

The one-story museum building contains an archive, photo-lab and work area in the basement. Part of the ground floor contains administrative offices, the rest consists of two exhibition halls and a linking room. Among the items on display are Palaeolithic tools, Neolithic arrowheads, pottery from the Copper Age, spearpoints, cooking utensils and jewellery from the Bronze and Iron Ages, as well as items from the Hellenistic and Roman periods, such as statues, mosaics and vessels of stone, ceramics and glass. In the basement, there are also many inscriptions from all periods since the Bronze Age and coins. Particularly, noteworthy is a Stele of the Weathergod, along with many other steles and stones with Luwian hieroglyphic inscriptions, which are on display outside the building. The collection is completed by items from the Islamic period, particularly the Seljuq and Ottoman eras.

There are items sourced from the Commagenian towns of Perrhe, Samosata, Ancoz and Direk Kale. A remarkable Votive relief of Jupiter Dolichenus is derived from Perrhe. Donald H. Sanders, the editor of the excavation reports of Nemrut Dag, states that 37 crates with fragments of sculptures and inscriptions from that site are kept in the basement of the museum.

The director of the museum, Fehmi Erarslan, states that the museum received around 30,000 visitors in 2010.
