= Ancoz =

Ancient settlement in Commagene, now modern Turkey

Ancoz is the name used in academic literature for an ancient settlement, which is located below the Atatürk Reservoir in the modern state of Turkey. It is located in the modern town of Eskitaş, which used to be called Ancoz.

== Location ==
The ancient settlement, whose name is unknown, was in Commagene, north of the Euphrates, on the Chabinas (modern Cendere Çayı), opposite the ancient city of Charmodara. On the hill where the acropolis was located there were two large springs. Both cities are now under the Atatürk Reservoir.

== History ==
During the Neo-Hittite period (1200-700 BC), Ancoz was a sanctuary site, where the gods Runtiya and Ala-Kubaba were worshipped, with dedicatory inscriptions from King Suppiluliuma and his son Hattusili. Later, the Commagenian king Antiochus I Theos (69-36 BC) had a sanctuary for the royal cult built, from which many Greek inscriptions survive. This was one of a series of similar sanctuaries built by the same king; the most significant of which was visible from Ancoz: Nemrut Dağı.

The Luwian hieroglyphic inscriptions: Ancoz 1 (lower part), 5, 7, 8, 9 und 10, are kept in the Adıyaman Archaeological Museum. The upper part of Ancoz 1 is in Adana Archaeology Museum and the location of the rest is unknown.

== Bibliography ==
- J. Wagner & G. Petzl, "Relief- und Inschriftfragmente des kommagenischen Herrscherkultes aus Ancoz." in G. Heedemann et al. Neue Forschungen zur Religionsgeschichte Kleinasiens : Elmar Schwertheim zum 60. Geburtstag gewidmet.
- J. David Hawkins, "Gods of Commagene: The cult of the Stag-God in the inscriptions of Ancoz." in Eva Cancik-Kirschbaum et al.: Diversity and Standardization Akademie Verlag, 2013, ISBN 978-3-05-005756-9. pp. 65–80.
