= Karasu relief =

Coordinates: 37°25′51″N 37°54′30.5″E

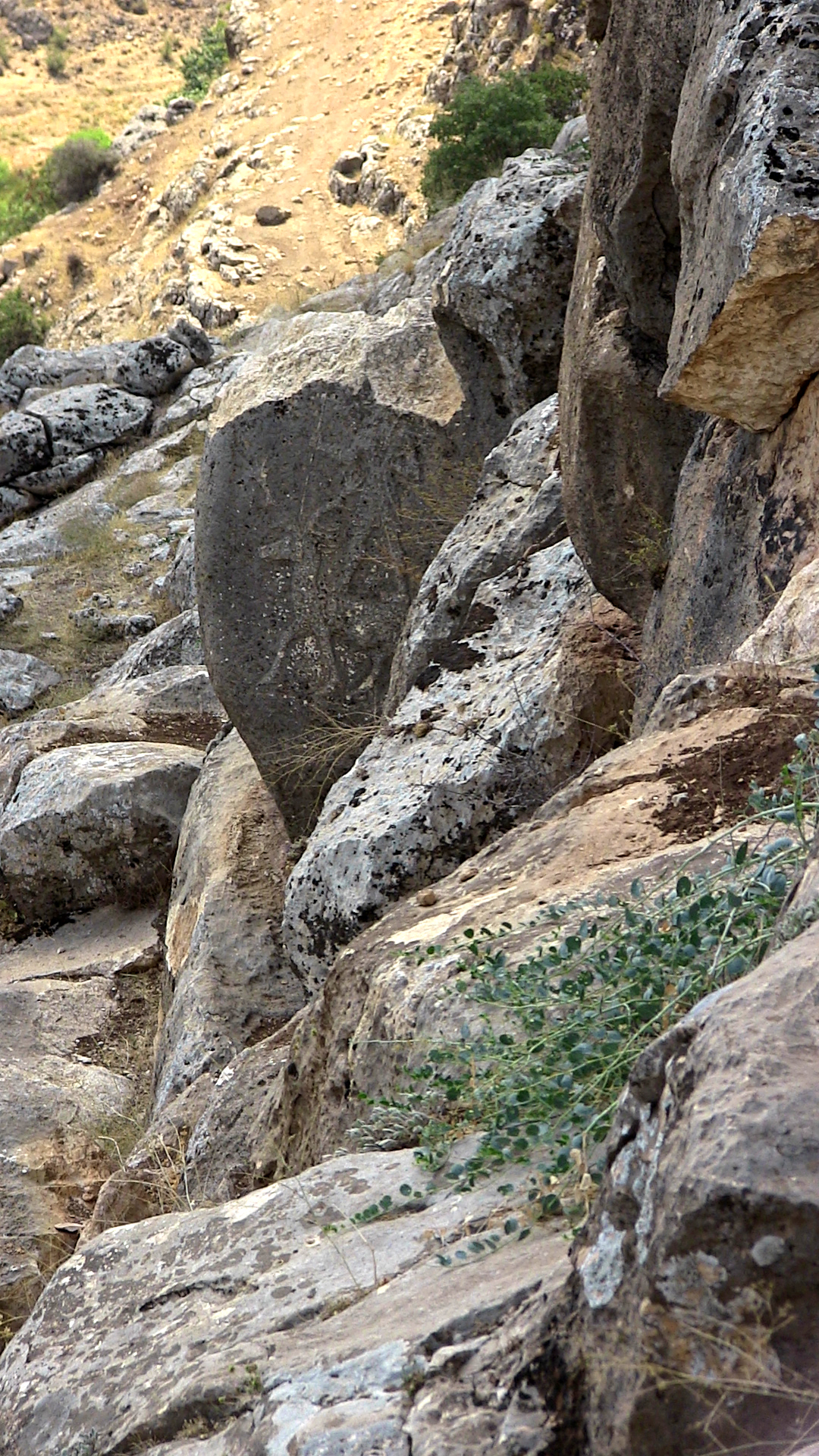
Kerasu relief

Location of the Karasu relief in Turkey

The Karasu relief, also known as the Süpürgüç relief after the earlier name of the nearby town of Akbudak, is a rock relief located on a tributary of the Euphrates and derives from the Neo-Hittite period. It depicts a protective god standing on a deer. Rock reliefs are a prominent aspect of Hittite art.

== Location and discovery ==
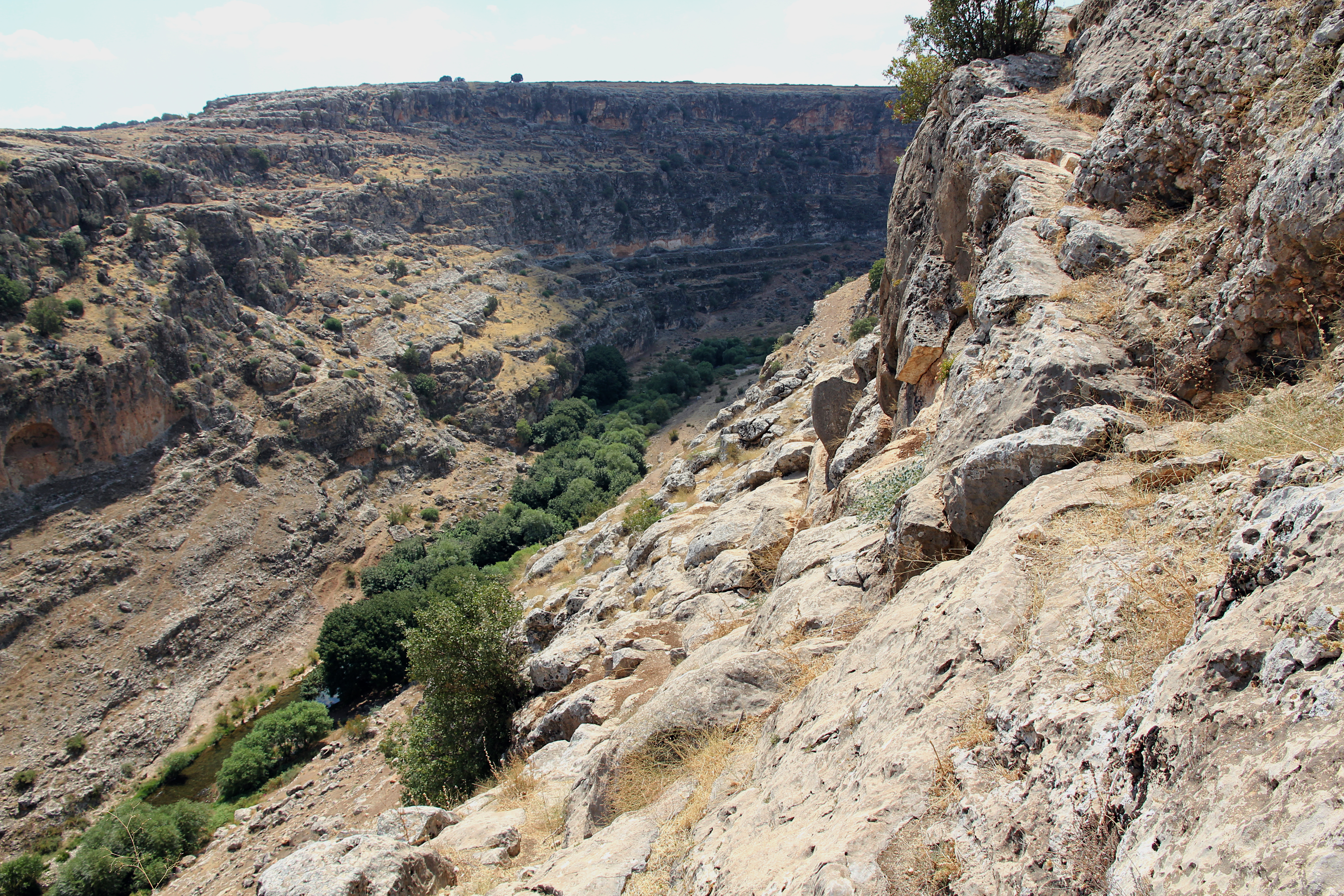
Location high above the river

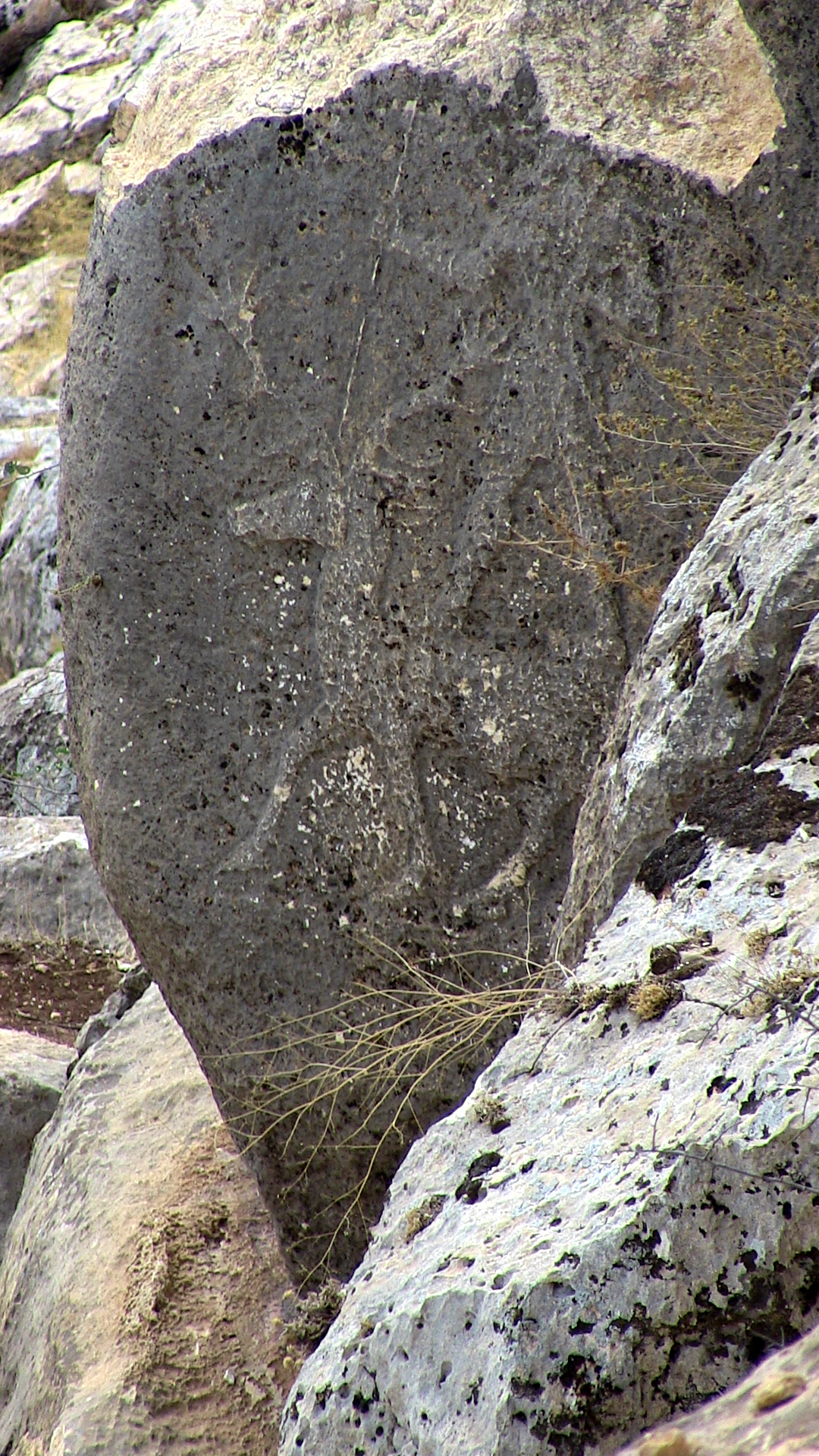
vertical

The relief is located near the town of Gümüşpınar near Akbudak in the district of Araban, Gaziantep Province, Turkey, on a cliff-face about 200 m above the Karasu river, about three km from where it meets the Euphrates. Here the river has dug a deep gorge in the limestone of the Kartal Dağı. A few metres below the top of the cliff is the relief on the east side of a rectangular outcrop. In the early first millennium BC the border between the Iron Age kingdoms of Kummuh (later Commagene) and Carchemish was located in the area. From the inscription on the late Assyrian relief at Kenk Boğazı, ten kilometres away, it appears that both reliefs were located within the kingdom of Kummuh.

The relief was discovered by geologists Krummanacher and Wilson in 1956 and first published by Charles A. Burney and Gordon R. J. Lawson in 1958.

== Description ==
The relief is 1.98 m high by 1.6 m wide. It shows a warrior standing on a deer. The deer is 1.2 m high, its back is 52 cm high and the body is 68 cm long. It faces left, with its head held high on a slender neck. The head with a slightly opened mouth is depicted in profile. A finely carved pair of antlers with two branches on each side is depicted front-on on top of the head. According to Frank Starke it is a red deer (Cervus elaphus).

On the back of the dear, there is a 1.2 m high male figure facing left and wearing a short kilt and shoes. He is armed with a spear in his right hand and holds a bow over his shoulder with his left hand. In 1976, the upper part of the cliff was blown away with dynamite by treasure hunters. Since then none of the head is visible except for the beard. On old illustrations show details of the face and the hair hanging down his neck. The wears the tall, round-topped hat of a god. A Sun symbol hovers above the figure. Although there is no inscription on the relief, the figure with the deer is clearly the protective god of the wild, Kurunta or Tuntija. The motif of the "god on the deer" is already known attested at Assyrian trade outposts and the Hittite empire at the beginning of the 2nd millennium BC. In late Hittite times the motif is found on, for example, the Hacıbebekli stele. Inspection revealed traces of a late Hittite settlement in the area, which suggests that the relief depicts a protective god of the settlement.

Hansgerd Hellenkemper and Jörg Wagner assigned the work to the "traditional style" (1050-850 BC) on the basis of stylistic elements, while Winfried Orthmann dated it to the "Late Hittite II" period (950-850 BC).

== Bridge ==
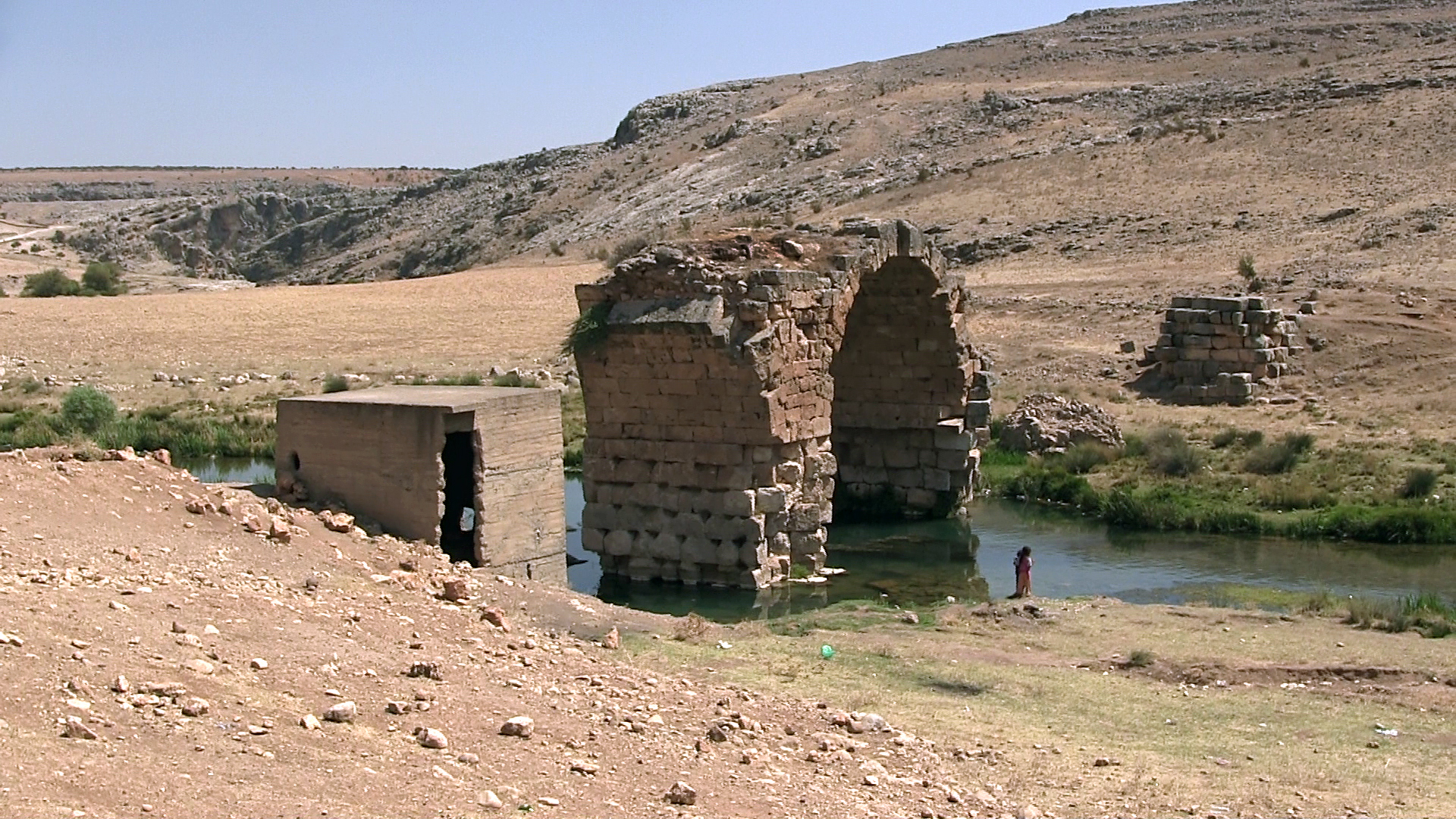
Roman bridge

About two kilometres upstream are the remains of a Roman bridge at Karasu, known in Turkish as Karasu Köprüsü. It was part of the military road which led from Zeugma to Samosata and was located south of the Monumental graves at Elif, Hisar und Hasanoğlu. From the bridge it is about forty-five minutes walk up the plateau to the relief.

== Bibliography ==
- Charles A. Burney, G. R. Lawson: "Urartian reliefs at Adilcevaz, on Lake Van, and a rock relief from the Karasu, near Birecik." Anatolian Studies 8, 1958, pp. 211–218.
- Hansgerd Hellenkemper, Jörg Wagner. "The God on the Stag. A Late Hittite Rock-Relief on the River Karasu" Anatolian Studies 27, 1977, pp. 167–173.
- Eberhard P. Rossner: Felsdenkmäler in der Türkei. Vol. 1: Die hethitischen Felsreliefs in der Türkei. Ein archäologischer Führer. 2nd, revised edition. Rossner, München 1988, ISBN 3-924390-02-9, pp. 198–201.
- Horst Ehringhaus. Das Ende, das ein Anfang war. Felsreliefs und Felsinschriften der luwischen Staaten Kleinasiens vom 12. bis 8./7. Jahrhundert v. Chr. Nünnerich-Asmus, Mainz 2014, ISBN 978-3-943904-67-3, pp. 95–101.
