= Castro of Vieito =

Portuguese archaeological site

- Castro de Vieito
- Interactive map of the Castro of Vieito area

General information
- Type: Castro
- Architectural style: castrejo
- Location: Perre, Viana do Castelo, Portugal
- Coordinates: 41°43′50.34″N 8°48′25.78″W
- Opened: 1st century BCE
- Owner: Portuguese Republic

The Castro of Vieito (Portuguese: Castro do Vieito) is an archaeological site of the Castro culture of northwestern Iberian Peninsula, situated on the right margin of the Lima River estuary, in the civil parish of Perre, municipality of Viana do Castelo.

== History ==
Lasting for a century, the settlement corresponded to the initial Romanization of the northwest corner of the Iberian Peninsula (from the late 1st century BCE to the first half of the 1st century AD, or as late as the year 70).

Much of the knowledge of this culture came from similar great settlements in the region, such as the Citânia de Santa Luzia. This culture is distinguished from others in the region by the scope of the spatial organization and size, that implies a proto-urban structure, and the elevated quantity of the exogenous artifacts.

The settlement is considered modest, with characteristics common for the larger settlements: such as a wall with monumental entrance-ways; the organization of the family living spaces and barrios; paved floors; a circular great house with bunk seating along the wall; and a home with rectangular courtyard, in addition to Roman coins in silver and bronze, amphorae, and rings. During the course of the investigations, numerous Haltern 70 baetic amphorae were collected, about 2775, or actually the largest group in the Roman Empire and twice the quantity discovered in the district capital Bracara Augusta. Its position along one of the largest rivers, meant that it was located in a privileged place for the Romans, crossroads of alluvial and mineral exploration along the river.

The presence of coins and jewellery shouldn't diminish the fact that the majority of the ceramics (about 80%) corresponded to regional pottery. The remainder of the elements are characterized by a provincialism that is difficult to reconcile with a modern urban environment, implying an urban-rural mix.

The presence of the large castro culture community was incentive enough for the president of the Municipal Council, and local authority of Perre, to request a meeting with the Instituto de Estradas de Portugal (IEP) in order to save the castro or mitigate its complete destruction with the construction of the A228/IC1.

== Architecture ==
Two-thirds of the site is crossed by a construction corridor of the A28/IC1 Autoestrada (Viana do Castelo-Caminha). Owing to this fact, an emergency archaeological intervention, directed by António José Marques da Silva, was funded between June 2004 and July 2005, completed by the company AMS-Análise e Consultadoria Arqueológica Lda. The area of the intervention covered an area of 15,000 square metres (160,000 ft^{2}), and resulted in the movement of 12,000 cubic metres (420,000 ft^{3}) of dirt and the archaeological remnants that included 14 tonnes of ceramics, and more than 1000 lithic artifacts.

The investigation covered a period of three years (financed by AMS) and involved the chrono-strategraphic analysis of the artifacts, revealing that field's occupation during the course of a century. There were no indications that the spaces were occupied prior to this period. The excavations revealed a traditional indigenous architecture, using circular dwellings generally completed with a vestibule in the form of a crab's pincer and oblong-shaped barns.
