= Perrhe =

Ancient city near modern Adiyaman, Turkey

Coordinates: 37°47′30″N 38°18′04″E

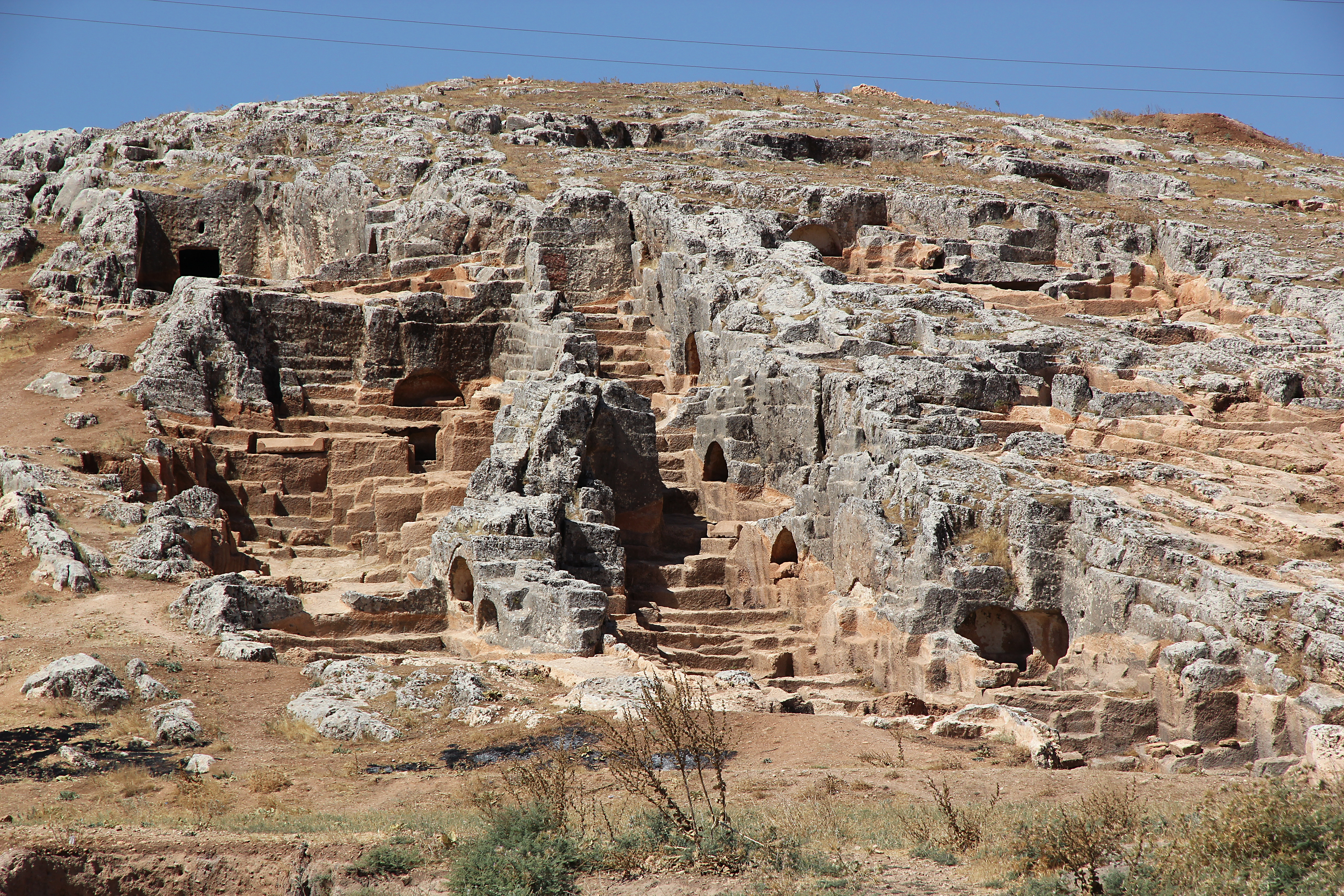
Necropolis of Perrhe

Perrhe (Ancient Greek: Πέρρη) was an ancient city in the kingdom of Commagene. The remains of the city are located in the modern suburb of Örenli (previously the village of Pirin or Pirun) in the northern section of Adıyaman, Turkey. Some authors identify it with Antiochia ad Taurum.

== History ==
According to the 1925 excavations of the Swiss anthropologist Eugène Pittard, Pirin was already inhabited in Paleolithic times. In antiquity, Perrhe was one of the four core cities of the kingdom of Commagene mentioned in inscriptions, along with Samosata, Marash and Doliche. It lay on the route from the capital of Samosata over the Taurus Mountains to Melitene. On account of a profuse spring, which was already famous in ancient times and which now issues from a Roman fountain in the middle of the town, Perrhe was an important staging post for travellers over the mountains. On the late antique Roman route map, the Tabula Peutingeriana, the town appears as the second stop on the route from Samosata in the direction of Comana. Under Antiochus IV (r. AD 38-72) Perrhe was refounded as the polis of Antiochia on the Taurus. A votive relief of Jupiter Dolichenus which was found in the city's necropolis in 2001 derives from this period. In AD 198/200, the city probably contributed financially to the construction of the Severan Bridge. A floor mosaic found in the city indicates the importance of the place during Christian times. Under the Byzantine Empire, Perrhe was a bishopric. In the Middle Ages, the city lost significance in the face of the town of Hisn-Mansur (modern Adıyaman).

== Description ==
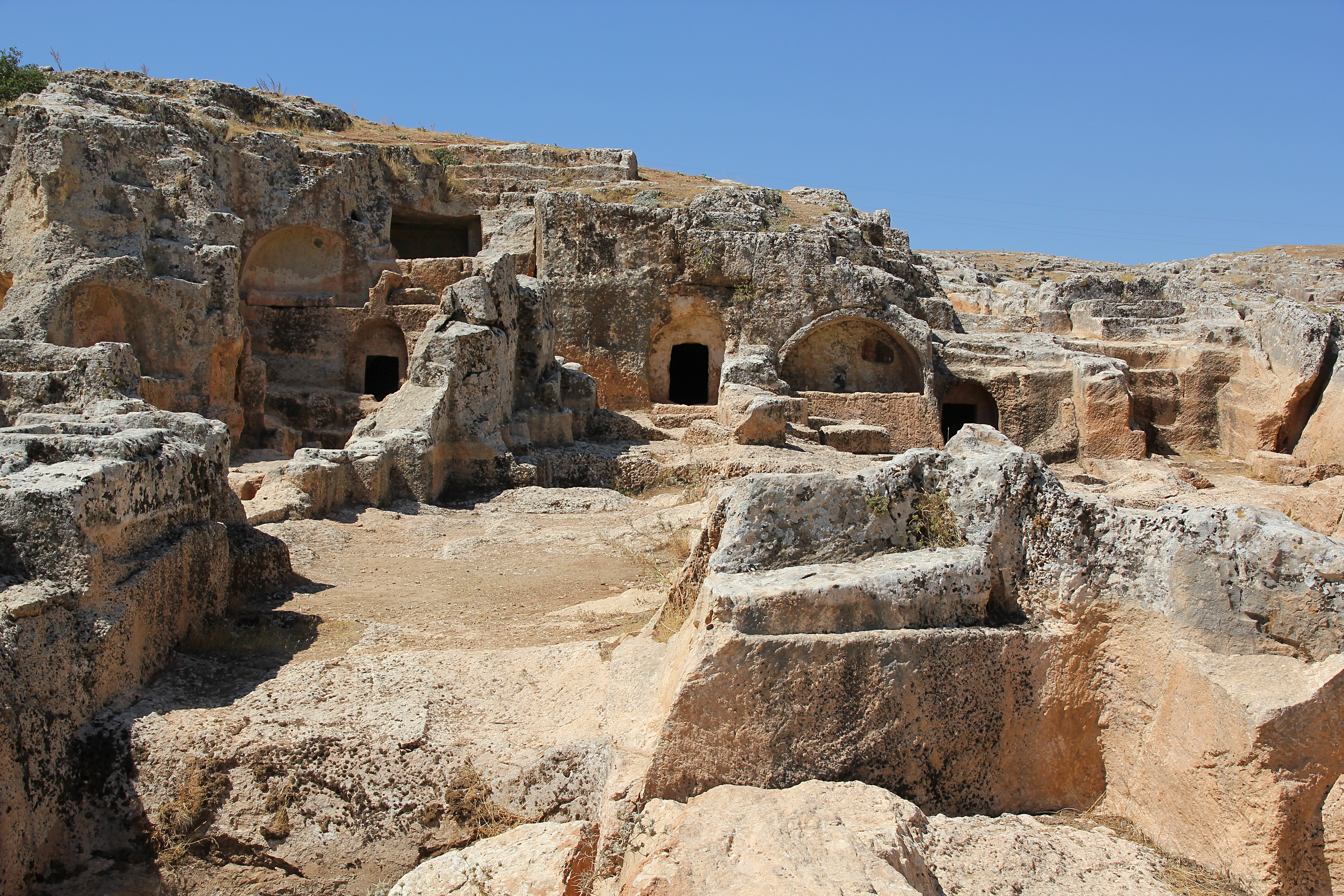
Necropolis

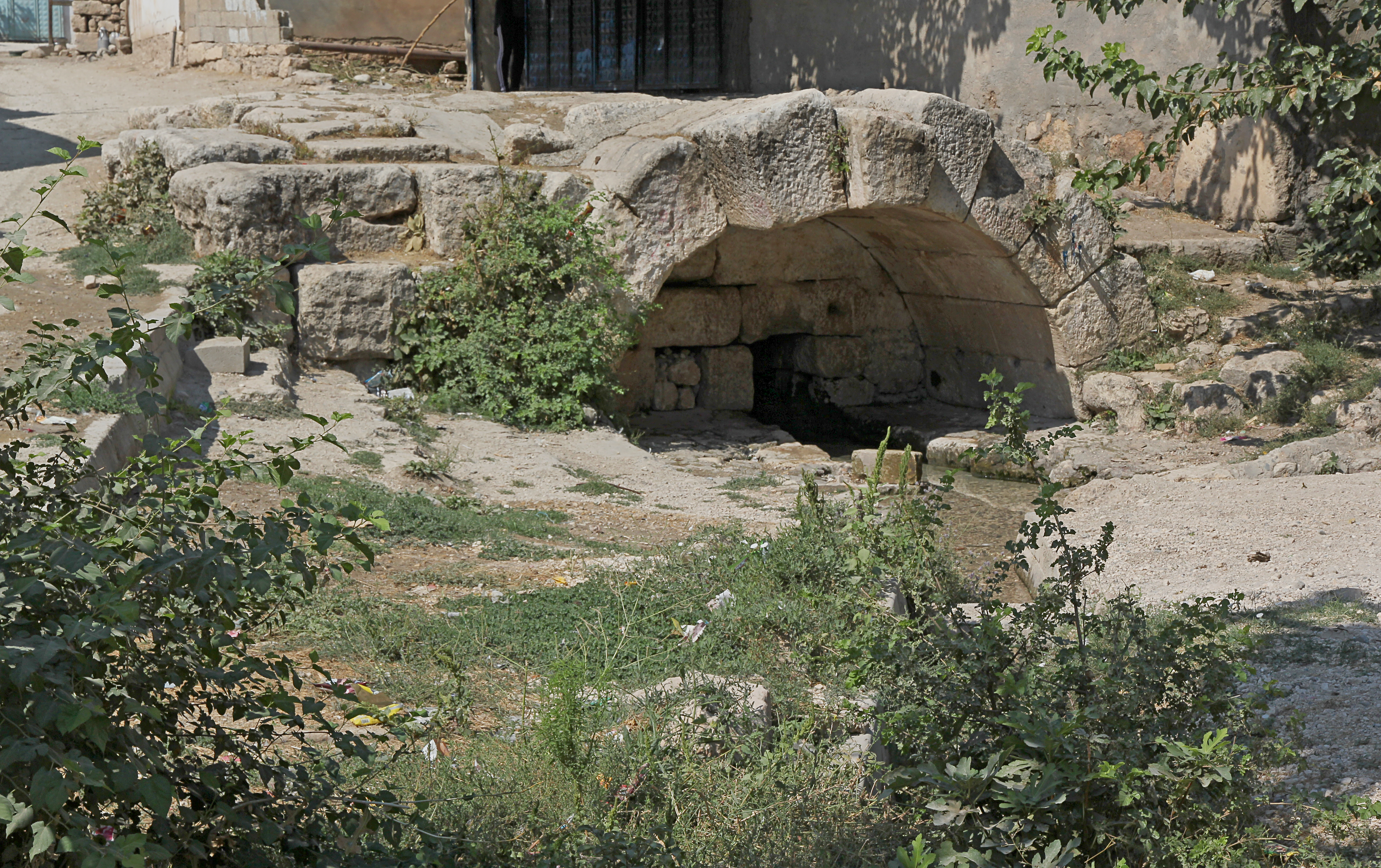
Roman fountain in the village of Pirin

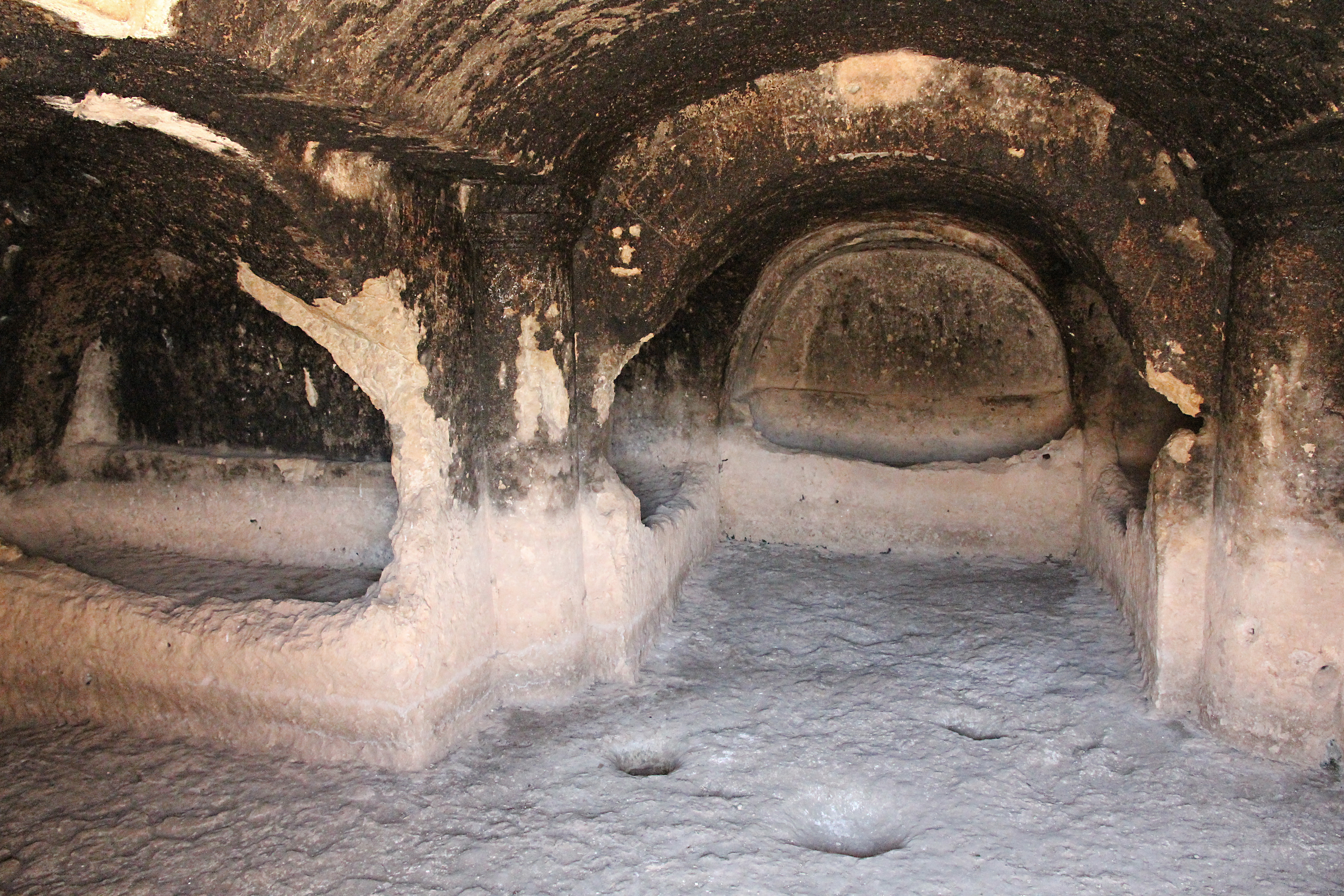
Catacombs with burial chambers and pilasters

Perrhe/Pirin is reached from the city of Adıyaman by travelling along Atatürk Bulvarı along a signposted route via Sakarya Caddesi. After about four kilometres, the necropolis appears on the left, stretching along the side of the street for almost a kilometre. After that one reaches the former village of Pirin. In the centre of the village is the Roman water fountain with a five-metre-wide (16 ft) stone vault covering a water channel. Remains of the city walls also survive. The vast necropolis contains free-standing sarcophagi and simple vaulted burial niches, as well as catacombs, which often contain several rooms, with vaulted niches dug out of the cliff face and irregularly separated by pilasters. Most of the graves are grouped together in sections accessed by stairs carved into the cliff face at various points. Some of the tombs have remains of reliefs still surviving in front of the entranceways, but there is no other decoration.

== Excavation ==
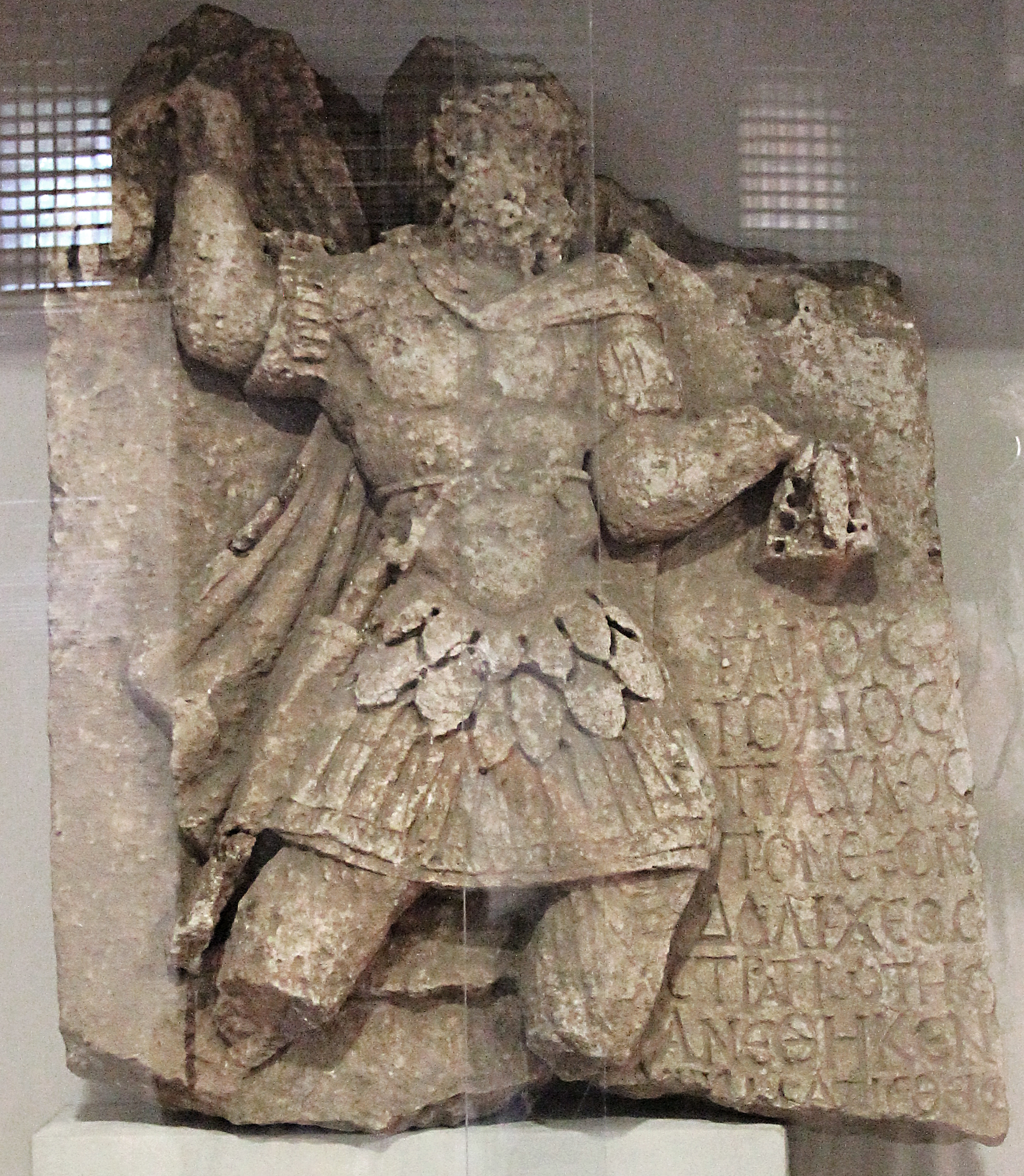
Votive relief of Jupiter Dolichenus in the Adıyaman Archaeological Museum

Otto Puchstein and Karl Sester visited the town in 1882, as Puchstein recorded in the volume Reisen in Kleinasien und Nordsyrien ("Travels in Asia Minor and North Syria) which he co-authored with Carl Humann. In 1925, Eugène Pittard discovered a Palaeolithic settlement at Pirin, which he investigated further in the following years. In 1945, İsmail Kılıç Kökten continued these investigations and found many new objects. Friedrich Karl Dörner and Rudolf Naumann carried out investigations of the village of Pirin and the necropolis in 1938 in the course of their expedition to Commagene. They found only a little spolia and a recently exposed floor mosaic, of which a single field consisting of an abstract pattern and an amphora with handles survived. This was further uncovered later and investigated by Hasan Candemir and Jörg Wagner in 1975. They were able to work out that it belonged to a Basilica with a 10 metre wide nave and two 3 metre wide side aisles and they dated the mosaic to the fifth century AD on the basis of its motifs. Dörner and Naumann also documented new sections of the necropolis. Excavations undertaken in this necropolis by the Adıyaman Archaeological Museum under the leadership of the museum director Fehmi Erarslan brought to light the aforementioned votive relief of Jupiter Dolichenus, along with numerous other archaeological, epigraphic and numismatic finds. Engelbert Winter of Münster University's Research Centre for Asia Minor has worked on the epigraphic finds and the relief at the museum in collaboration with Margherita Facella of Pisa and Charles Crowther of Oxford.

== Bishopric ==
Perrhe was a bishopric in the ecclesiastical province of Hierapolis Bambyce. As Perre, it is a titular bishopric of the Roman Catholic church. Joseph Marie Henri Belleau OMI held the titual bishopric as Apostolic Vicar of Baie de James (Canada) from 1939 to 1976.

== Bibliography ==
- Friedrich Karl Dörner, Der Thron der Götter auf dem Nemrud Dağ. 2nd Edition. Gustav Lübbe, 1987, pp. 61–64 ISBN 3-7857-0277-9
- Fehmi Erarslan: "Die antike Stadt Perrhe und ihre Nekropole," in Jörg Wagner (Ed.), Gottkönige am Euphrat. Neue Ausgrabungen und Forschungen in Kommagene. Von Zabern, Mainz 2012, pp. 146–150 ISBN 978-3-8053-4218-6.
- Fehmi Eraslan, Engelbert Winter: "Perrhe (Pirun) – Geographische Lage, Topographie und (Forschungs-) Geschichte," in: Engelbert Winter (ed.), ΠΑΤΡΙΣ ΠΑΝΤΡΟΦΟΣ ΚΟΜΜΑΓΗΝΗ. Neue Funde und Forschungen zwischen Taurus und Euphrat. Habelt, Bonn 2008, pp. 179–187.
