= Innara =

Goddess in Hittite–Hurrian mythology

Innara (Cuneiform: 𒀭𒆗 ^{d}LAMMA) is the Hittite god of woods and fields.

Inar is mentioned in the Hahhima-myth. There Tarhun sends Inar to look for sun god Istanu, but the ice devil Hahhima freezes Inar. Inar's tasks are similar to the tasks of the god of wild animals and hunting, Kurunta.

== Name ==
In the Luwian language, Innara is called Annari.

The name of the god comes from the word innara-, meaning "power, strength", which itself comes from *h₁en-h₂nor-o-, a Proto-Indo-European word meaning "having masculinity", from the root *h₂ner- 'man'.

== Bibliography ==
- Piotr Taracha: Religions of Second Millennium Anatolia. Harrassowitz Verlag, Wiesbaden 2009, ISBN 978-3-447-05885-8.
