= Torreon (disambiguation) =

Torreón is a city in the Mexican state of Coahuila.

Torreon or Torreón may also refer to:

- Torreón Municipality, Coahuila, Mexico
- Roman Catholic Diocese of Torreón, Coahuila, Mexico
- Torreón massacre, a racially motivated massacre in 1911 in Torreón, Coahuila, Mexico
- Torreon, Sandoval County, New Mexico, USA, a rural census-designated place (CDP)
- Torreon, Torrance County, New Mexico, USA, a farming community and CDP
- Torreón de la Chorrera, a fortification in Havana, Cuba
- Torreón de Llanes, a medieval tower in Llanes, Asturias, Spain
- Torreón Airport, near Coelemu, Bío Bío, Chile
