= Kurunta (god) =

Hittite god

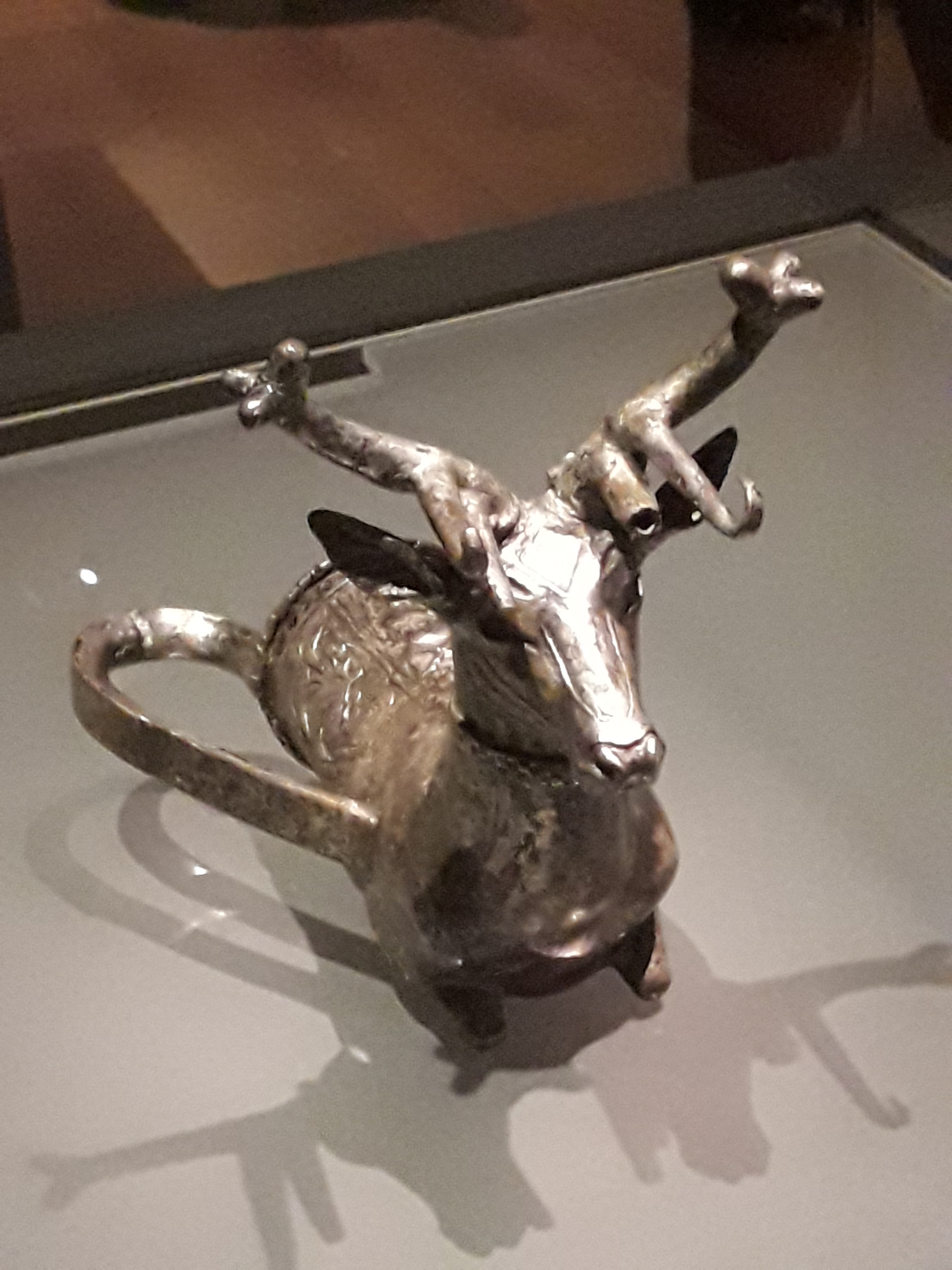
Rhyton (drinking vessel) in the shape of a deer with an engraving of god Kurunta. Silver with gold inlays. Hittite kingdom, Imperial era. Central Anatolia (now Turkey). 1400-1200 BC. New York, Metropolitan Museum of Art.

Kurunta (Hittite: 𒀭𒆗, romanized: ^{d}LAMMA) or Kurunti(ya) is the Hittite stag god and a tutelary god of the countryside.

== Name ==
The name of Kurunta is spelled as (DEUS)CERVUS in Hieroglyphic Luwian, or as ^{d}KAL in Hittite cuneiform. As ^{d}KAL has to be read as ^{d}LAMMA following Assyriological tradition, many times it is directly transliterated as ^{d}LAMMA instead.

Kurunta was attested as Runti(ya) in the first millennium BC, although there is a possibility that the loss of the initial syllable may have occurred during the time of the Hittite New Kingdom/Empire period.

== Character and iconography ==
Kurunta is a tutelary deity, as seen from the usage of the sign ^{d}KAL which corresponds to ^{d}LAMMA. However, there are still differences between the Hittite ^{d}KAL deities and the Mesopotamian ^{d}LAMMA deities, such as that KAL and LAMMA have different meanings, and Archi adds that unlike the Mesopotamian ^{d}LAMMA the Hittite ^{d}KAL deities were always considered male. (Note: Although the Mesopotamian ^{d}LAMMA deities are not always female)

His sacred animal is the stag. Although the stag was not the symbol for all Hittite tutelary deities, it was also not exclusive to Kurunta. He is commonly depicted standing on a stag, and Hittite texts identify the god standing on the stag as the god of the countryside. Depictions of a god standing on a stag and holding an eagle were already known during Old Assyrian times. Other depictions have the god holding a hare instead of an eagle. In Yazilikaya, a tutelary god of nature (likely Kurunta as the god is accompanied by the antler sign) is depicted with only a crook. There are also parallels with Kurunta following behind a storm god, as seen in a sea of Mursili III and a relief from Aleppo.

The Schimmel silver rhyton depicts an offering scene to two deities, one standing on a stag holding an eagle and a curved staff, and the other one sitting behind holding a bird and a cup. It could be a single deity that was depicted twice, or two separate deities. Archi proposes that the female deity behind the one standing on the stag represents not the wife of Innara/Kurunta as commonly suggested, but his daughter instead.

There are also depictions of Kurunta holding a bow and arrows, which outside of due to him being a tutelary god also connects him to hunting. The hunting aspect was also emphasized by Tudhaliya IV.

== Association with other deities ==
^{d}KAL in Hittite contexts is usually read as Innara, which could signify any of the tutelary deities, including Kurunta and Inara. During the time of Tudhaliya IV, (DEUS)CERVUS could be used to represent both Innara and Kurunta, possibly indicating that Innara and Kurunta stopped being viewed as separate.

CERVUS was also used to denote gods of similar character to Kurunta, such as Karhuha, the main male deity of Carchemish.

== Worship ==
The tutelary god of the countryside appears to have been primarily worshiped outside of the capital of Hattusa in the provinces. In the ritual for the Stormgod of Kuliwišna, the tutelary god of the countryside receives offerings together with Ishtar of the countryside.

In the Old Hittite KI.LAM festival, a priest of the stag god followed the royal pair in the proceeding. Other figures of animals were then included, including figures of the stag. The section concerning the ritual action describes how the tutelary god had to be pleased for the reintegration of hunted wild animals.

In later documentation, the god most connected with the singers of Kanesh was the tutelary god of the countryside, replacing Inar from the Old Hittite documents involving the singers of Kanesh/Nesha.

As campaigns and hunts were important for the authority of the Hittite king, the cult of the stag god was under Hittite royal authority since early on. Innara also accompanied the Hittite king on campaigns. The cult of Kurunta became important for the Hittite state cult during the reign of Tudhaliya IV. Several hieroglyphic inscriptions in various locations states that Tudhaliya established cultic monuments to the god. Collins believes that the interest Tudhaliya displays for the stag god is due to his vulnerable royal position (his father, Hattusili III, usurped the crown from Urhi-Teshub) and as such, sought to secure as much divine support as possible. A late Hittite text describes all the activities and manifestations of the king as being under the protection of Kurunta.

Kurunta may have been the stag god honored in Malatya. Although it could also be Karhuha, Haas believes it is more likely to be Kurunta.

Theophoric names of Kurunta were attested in Greece, especially Cicilia and Pesidia until the Hellenistic period.

== Mythology ==
Haas seems to believe that the ^{d}LAMMA deity mentioned in the Song of LAMMA (from the Kumarbi Cycle) is Kurunta, or at least a variation of the god. Haas argues that the act of cutting up the god in the end symbolizes cutting up a hunted animal.

== See also ==
- Runtiya
- Innara
