= Kâhta Çayı =

River in Adıyaman, Turkey

Coordinates: 37°37′N 38°42′E

The Kâhta Çayı is a river in Adıyaman Province, Turkey, mostly in Kâhta district, rising in the southeast Taurus Mountains and draining into the Atatürk Reservoir.

Its ancient name was the Nymphaios (Νυμφαίος) or Nymphaeus river.

For most of its course, the Kâhta has a braided channel. The ancient city of Arsameia lay on its middle course, before the Cendere Çayı feeds it on the right. Before the Atatürk Dam was built, the Kâhta was a right tributary of the Euphrates River.
