= Cendere Çayı =

River in Adıyaman Province, Turkey

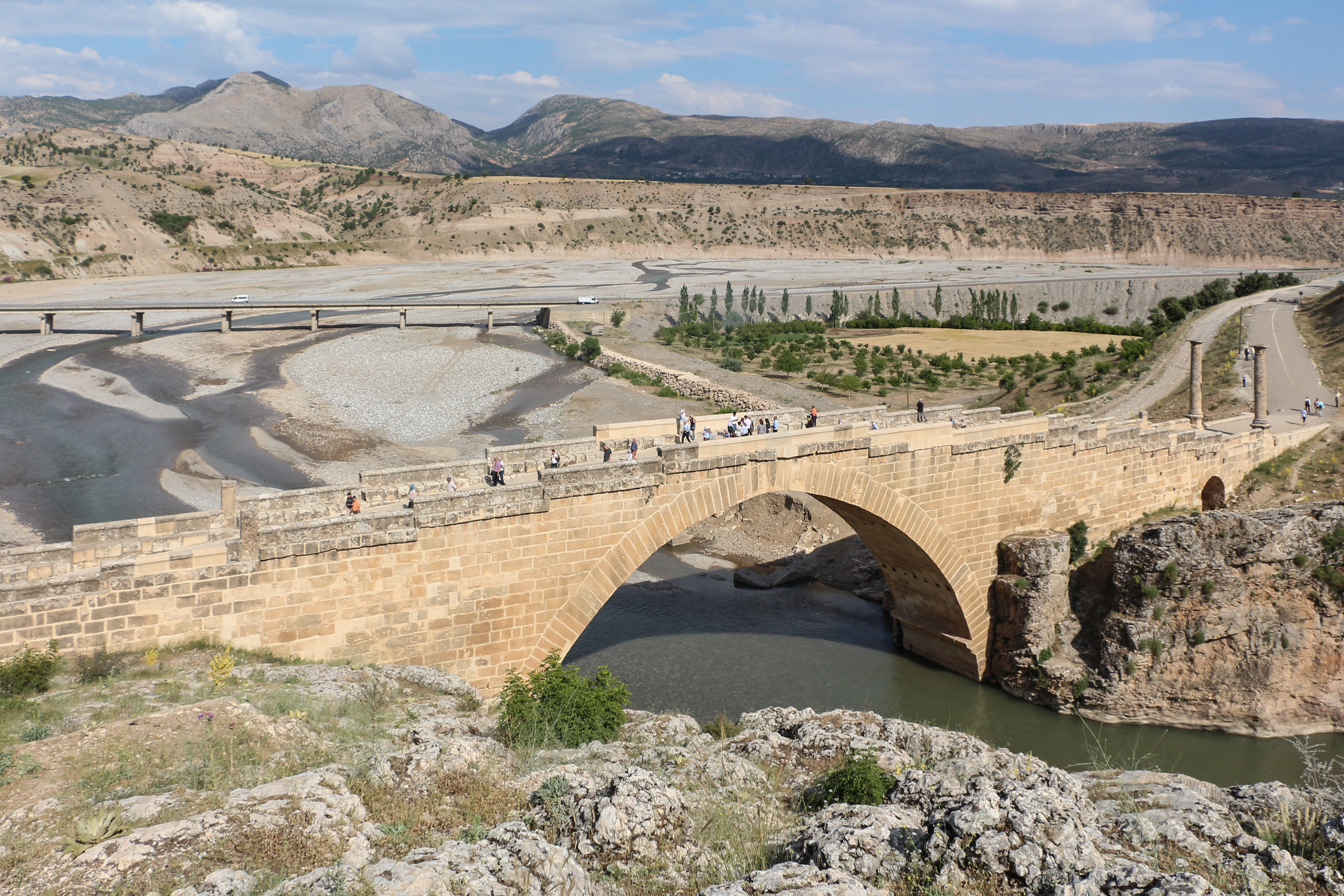
The Severan Bridge crossing the Cendere Çayı

The Cendere Çayı, formerly the Bölam Su, is a right tributary of Kâhta Çayı in Adıyaman Province, Turkey.

A major Roman bridge, the Severan Bridge, crosses it. The Latin inscription on the bridge calls the river Chabina(s).
