= Severan Bridge =

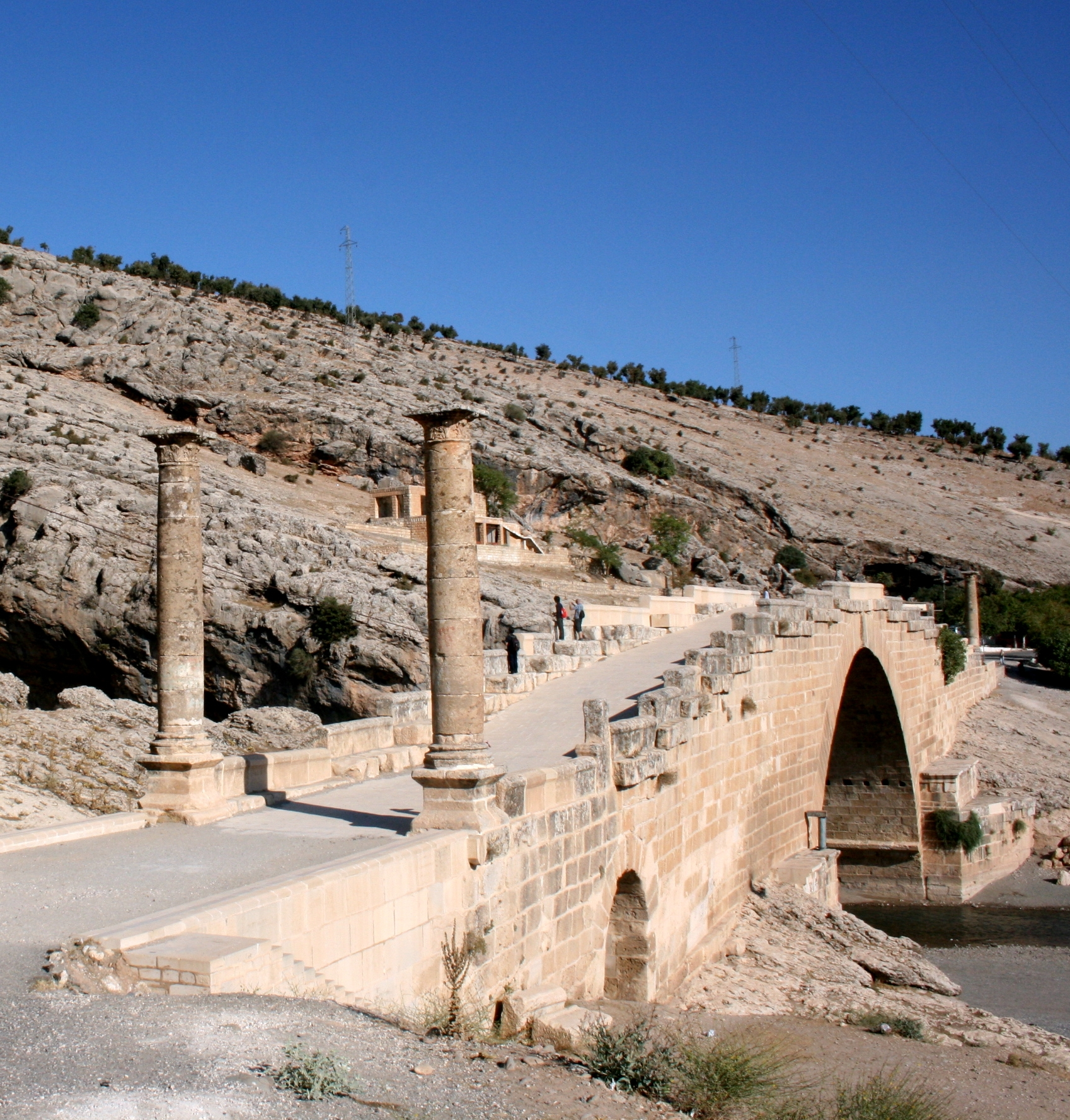
- Severan Bridge with the columns of Roman Emperor Lucius Septimius Severus and his second wife Julia Domna seen from the south.
- Coordinates: 37°55′58″N 38°36′31″E
- Carries: Road traffic and pedestrians
- Crosses: Chabinas Creek (Cendere Çayı)
- Locale: Between Kahta and Sincik in Adıyaman Province, Turkey
- Official name: Cendere Köprüsü

Characteristics
- Design: Simple, unadorned, single majestic arch
- Total length: 120 m (390 ft)
- Width: 7 m (23 ft)
- Longest span: 34.2 m (112 ft)

History
- Construction end: c200

Location
- Interactive map of Severan Bridge

The Severan Bridge (also known as Chabinas Bridge or Cendere Bridge or Septimius Severus Bridge; Turkish: Cendere Köprüsü) is a Roman bridge constructed c. 200 CE located near the ancient city of Arsameia (today Eskikale), 55 km (34 mi) north east of Adıyaman in southeastern Turkey. It spans the Cendere Çayı (Chabinas Creek), a tributary of Kâhta Creek, on provincial road 02-03 from Kâhta to Sincik in Adıyaman Province. This bridge was described and pictured in 1883 by archeologists Osman Hamdi Bey and Osgan Efendi. It has a photo and description in David George Hogarth's Wandering Scholar.

== Description and history ==
The bridge is constructed as a simple, unadorned, single arch on two rocks at the narrowest point of the creek. At 34.2 m (112 ft) clear span, the Cendere bridge is the longest known extant Roman arch bridge. It is 120 m (390 ft) long and 7 m (23 ft) wide.

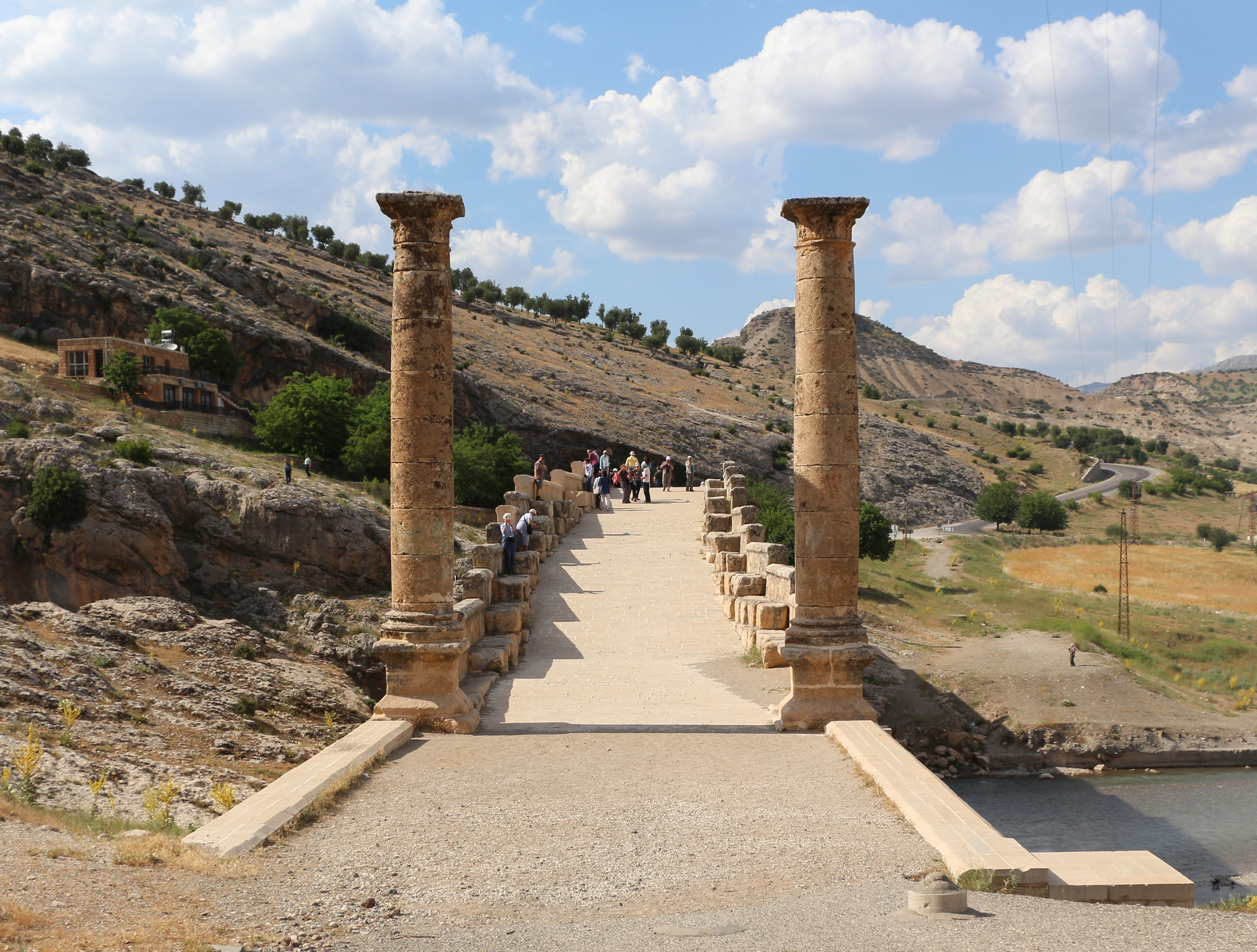
Roadway flanked by ancient columns

The bridge was rebuilt by the Legio XVI Gallica, garrisoned in the ancient city of Samosata (today Samsat) to begin a war with Parthia. Commagenean cities built four Corinthian columns on the bridge, in honor of the Roman Emperor Lucius Septimius Severus (193–211), his second wife Julia Domna, and their sons Caracalla and Publius Septimius Geta as stated on the inscription in Latin on the bridge. Two columns on the Kâhta side are dedicated to Septimius Severus himself and his wife, and two more on the Sincik side are dedicated to Caracalla and Geta, all in 9–10 m in height. Geta's column, however, was removed after his assassination by his brother Caracalla, who damned Geta's memory and ordered his name to be removed from all inscriptions.

The Severan Bridge is situated within one of the most important national parks in Turkey, which contains Nemrut Dağı with the famous remains of Commagene civilization on top, declared as World Cultural Heritage site by UNESCO. The bridge has been in continuous use since its construction. In 1997, the bridge was restored. Vehicular traffic was restricted to 5 tons or less. The bridge is now closed to vehicles, and a new road bridge has been built 500 m (550 yd) east of the old bridge.

== See also ==
- List of Roman bridges
- Roman architecture
- Roman engineering
