= Adıyaman =

- Municipality
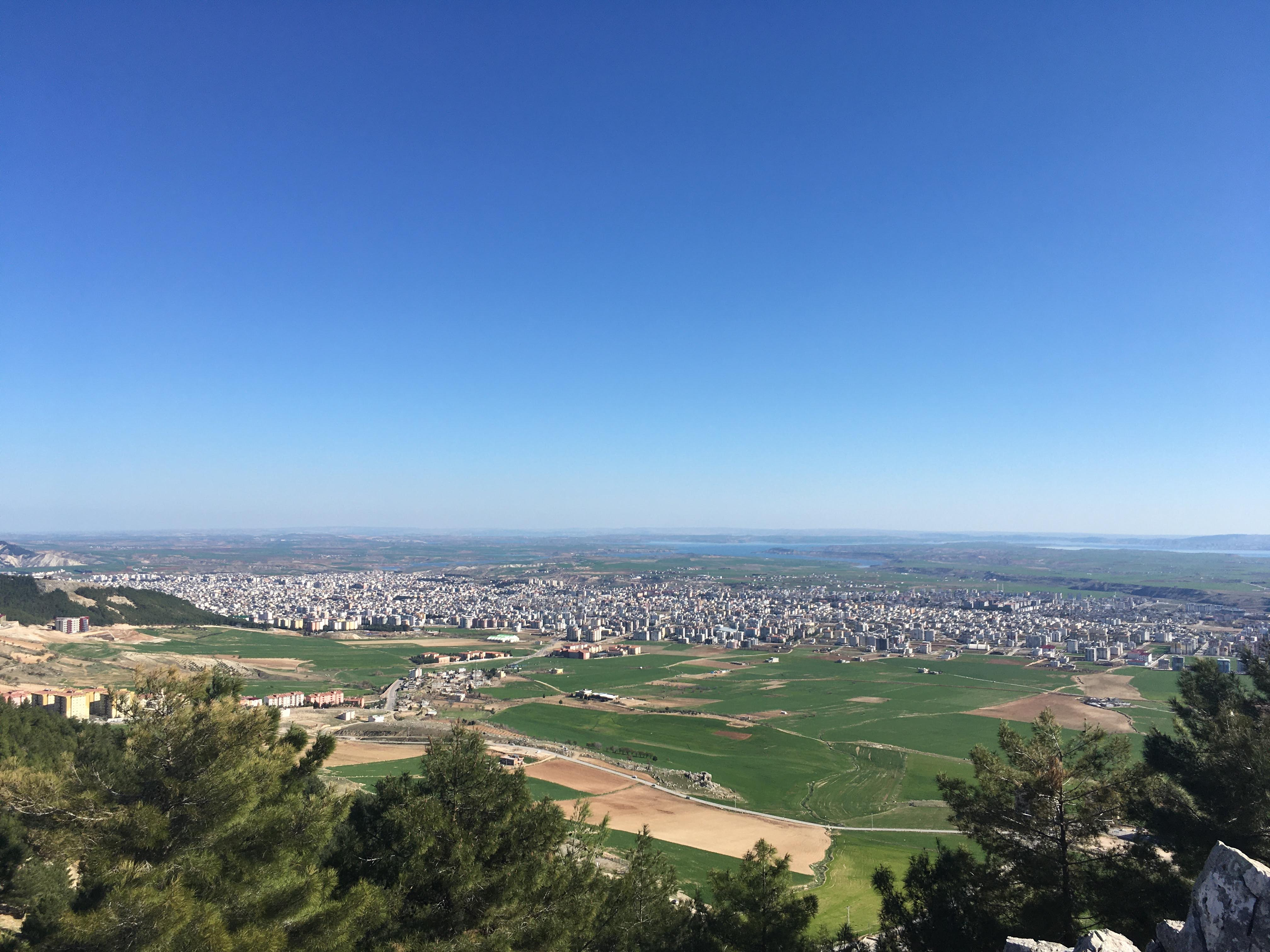
- Adıyaman city center seen from the north in 2020

- Logo

- Location within Turkey
- Coordinates: 37°45′50″N 38°16′40″E
- Country: Turkey
- Province: Adıyaman
- District: Adıyaman

Government
  - Mayor: Abdurrahman Tutdere (CHP)
- Population (2024): 290,883
- Time zone: UTC+3 (TRT)
- Website: www.adiyaman.bel.tr

Adıyaman (Kurdish: Semsûr) is a city in southeastern Turkey. It is the administrative centre of Adıyaman Province and Adıyaman District. Its population is 290,883 (2024). The inhabitants of the city are mostly Kurdish.

== Etymology ==
An unverified theory is that the former name of the city, Hisn-Mansur derives from the name of the Umayyad Emir Mansur ibn Jawana who was killed by the Abbasid Caliph Al-Mansur in this region in 758. Because of the difficulty among the locals in pronouncing Hisn-Mansur, the corruption Semsur emerged.

Various unverifiable theories exist for the name.

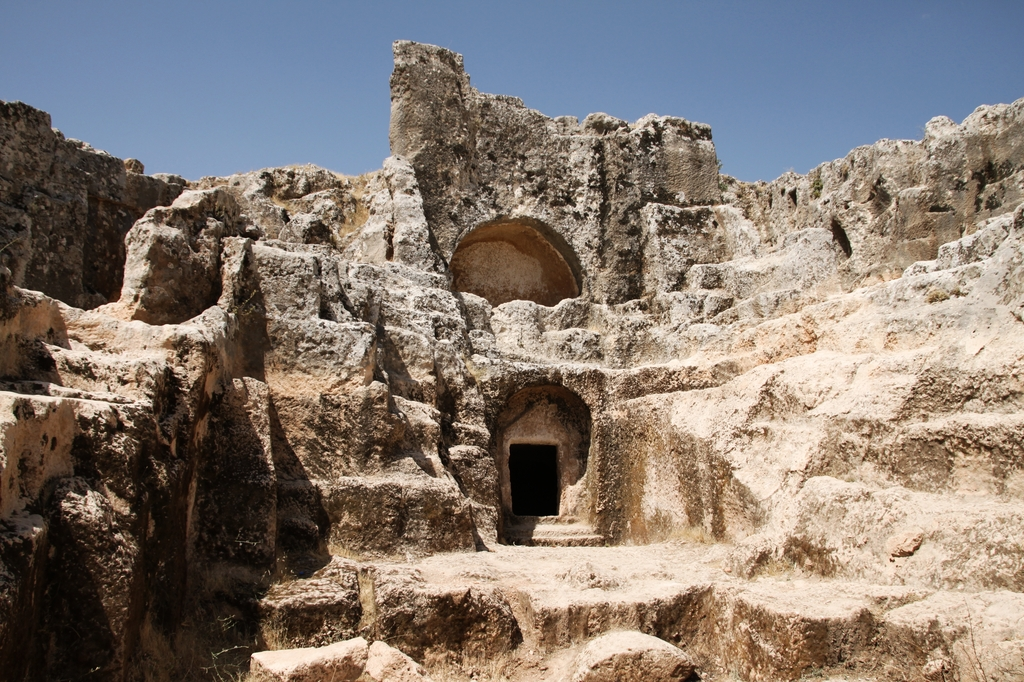
Ruins of Perre

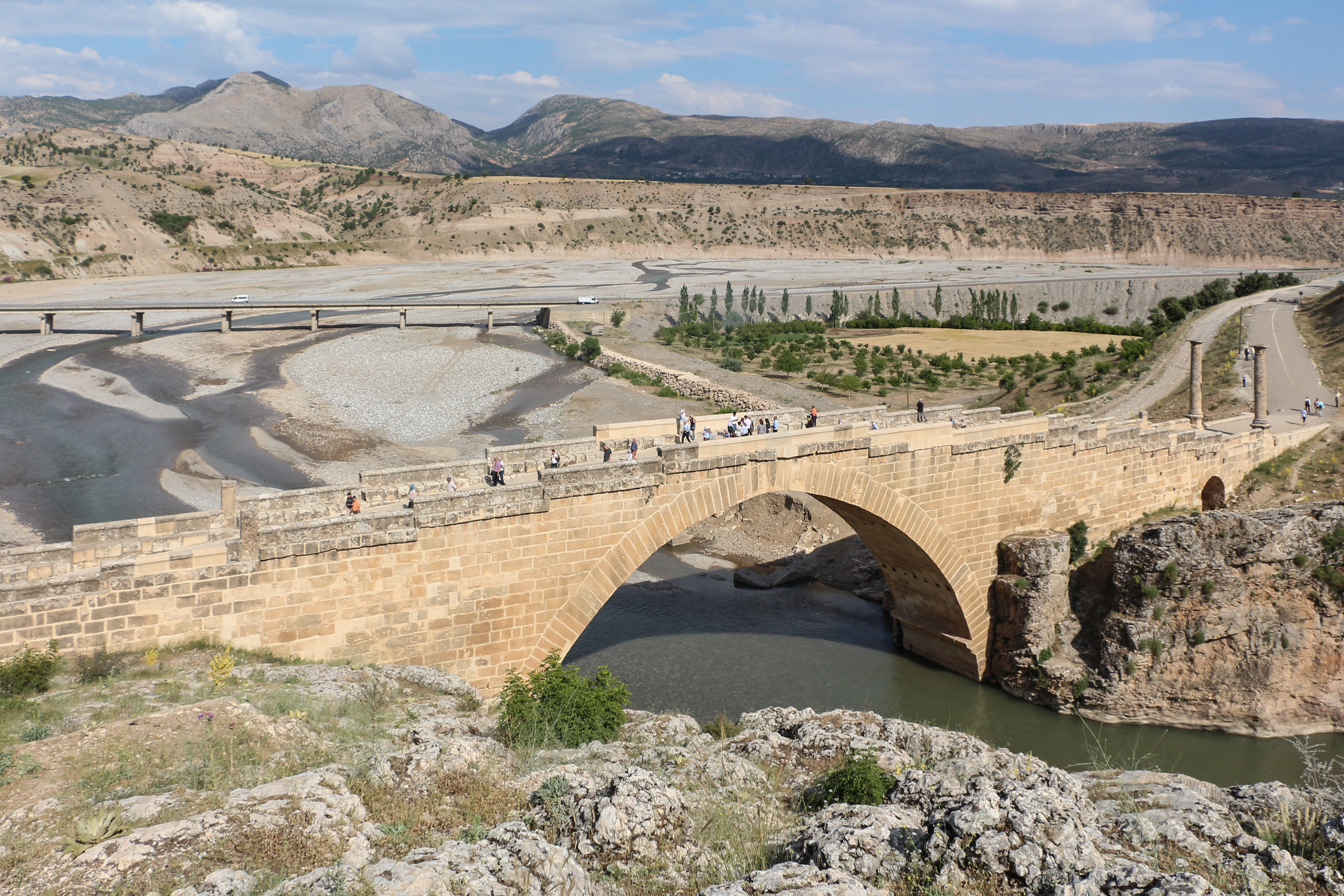
Severan Bridge

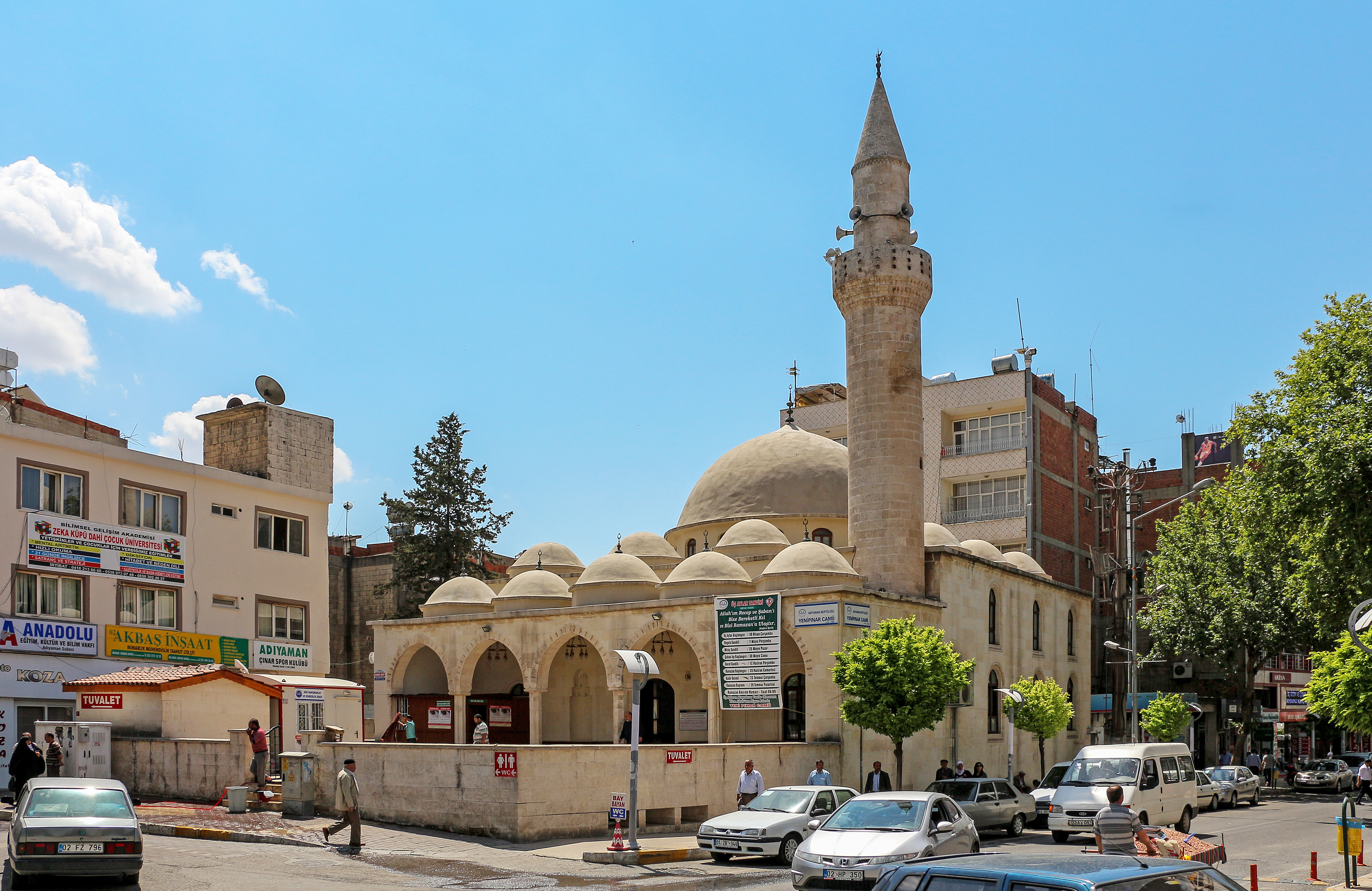
Yenipınar Mosque

== History ==
The first settlement on the site of the city was the ancient town of Perrhe, part of the kingdom of Commagene before it became part of the Roman and later Byzantine Empire.

It was then captured by the Arabs and became known as Hisn Mansur. It became a contested border town between the Abbasid caliphate and the Byzantines and was therefore well protected; a wall with three gates and a ditch guarded the town while in its middle stood a fortress with double walls.

In the early eleventh century, the town formed part of the Byzantine defences in the Euphrates region together with Edessa, Gargar, Samosata and Chasanara. In 1066/1067, the region around the town was ravaged by a Turkish emir called Gümüshtekīn who took booty and captives. By the end of the eleventh century, the Byzantines had lost control of the town and it was now in possession of the Armenian local ruler Kogh Vasil.

== Places of interest ==
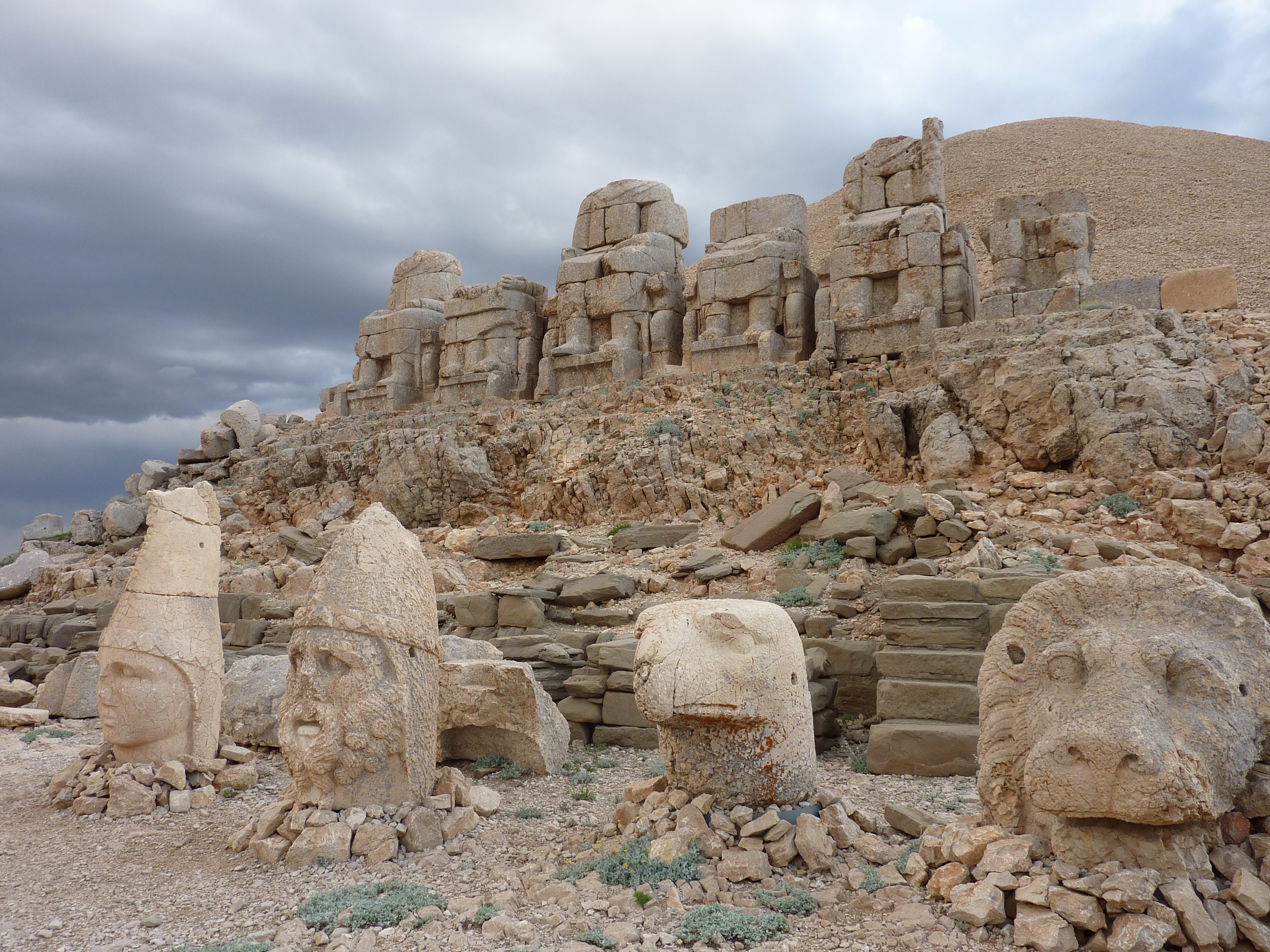
Mount Nemrut

There is some passing tourist trade, the main tourist attraction being Mount Nemrut.

- The caves of Pirin (ancient city of Perrhe) are 5 km (3 mi). from Adıyaman. These have been used as a burial ground for thousands of years. The sights include the ruins of the city and burial caves carved into the rock.
- The only active church in Adıyaman Province is located here, where it is the center of the Syriac Orthodox patriarchal vicarate of Adıyaman. It was renovated and reopened in 2012.

== Neighbourhoods ==
The city has 33 quarters, including Altınşehir, Yenimahalle, and Esentepe.

== Education ==
Adıyaman University is the sole university in the province. The city's three prominent high schools are Adıyaman Science High School, Esentepe Anatolian High School, and Altınşehir Anatolian High School, respectively.

== Climate ==
Adıyaman has a hot summer Mediterranean climate (Csa) under both the Köppen and Trewartha classifications, with some continental characteristics. Summers are very hot and very dry. Temperatures often reach 40 °C (104 °F) at the height of summer. The highest recorded temperature was 45.3 °C (113.5 °F) on 30 July 2000. Winters in Adıyaman are cool to cold with heavy precipitation. Due to its inland location and relatively high altitude, frost and snow are common. The lowest recorded temperature was −14.4 °C (6.1 °F) on 24 January 1972.

Climate data for Adıyaman (1991–2020, extremes 1963–2024)
Month	Jan	Feb	Mar	Apr	May	Jun	Jul	Aug	Sep	Oct	Nov	Dec	Year
Record high °C (°F)	19.9 (67.8)	23.8 (74.8)	28.3 (82.9)	34.5 (94.1)	39.0 (102.2)	43.0 (109.4)	45.3 (113.5)	45.2 (113.4)	42.2 (108.0)	36.1 (97.0)	29.4 (84.9)	26.5 (79.7)	45.3 (113.5)
Mean daily maximum °C (°F)	9.2 (48.6)	10.9 (51.6)	15.7 (60.3)	21.1 (70.0)	27.4 (81.3)	34.1 (93.4)	38.7 (101.7)	38.6 (101.5)	33.6 (92.5)	26.3 (79.3)	17.4 (63.3)	11.1 (52.0)	23.7 (74.7)
Daily mean °C (°F)	5.0 (41.0)	6.2 (43.2)	10.4 (50.7)	15.3 (59.5)	20.9 (69.6)	27.1 (80.8)	31.5 (88.7)	31.2 (88.2)	26.2 (79.2)	19.7 (67.5)	11.9 (53.4)	6.8 (44.2)	17.7 (63.9)
Mean daily minimum °C (°F)	1.8 (35.2)	2.5 (36.5)	5.9 (42.6)	10.0 (50.0)	14.7 (58.5)	20.1 (68.2)	24.1 (75.4)	23.9 (75.0)	19.4 (66.9)	14.2 (57.6)	7.6 (45.7)	3.6 (38.5)	12.3 (54.1)
Record low °C (°F)	−14.4 (6.1)	−10.0 (14.0)	−7.0 (19.4)	−2.0 (28.4)	3.4 (38.1)	10.6 (51.1)	15.0 (59.0)	15.8 (60.4)	9.6 (49.3)	2.2 (36.0)	−3.5 (25.7)	−8.4 (16.9)	−14.4 (6.1)
Average precipitation mm (inches)	140.5 (5.53)	107.1 (4.22)	87.3 (3.44)	61.7 (2.43)	45.2 (1.78)	9.4 (0.37)	1.9 (0.07)	2.5 (0.10)	9.2 (0.36)	48.6 (1.91)	74.1 (2.92)	142.0 (5.59)	729.5 (28.72)
Average precipitation days	12.37	11.77	11.47	11.3	8.4	3	0.8	0.67	1.63	6.8	8.3	11.7	88.2
Average snowy days	2.7	0.6	0.3	0	0	0	0	0	0	0	0	0.8	4.4
Average relative humidity (%)	66.4	64.4	57.9	55.1	47.6	33	27.5	29.4	33.3	45.5	59	67.4	48.9
Mean monthly sunshine hours	106.7	120.6	168.1	210.6	267.3	322.7	347.4	323.6	264.9	204.7	145.7	97.9	2,580.2
Mean daily sunshine hours	3.5	4.4	5.5	7.1	8.7	10.8	11.2	10.4	8.8	6.6	5.0	3.3	7.1
Source 1: Turkish State Meteorological Service
Source 2: NCEI(humidity, sun 1991-2020), Meteomanz(snow days 2008-2023)

== See also ==
- Anatolian Tigers
- Kawi (tribe)
- Reşwan (tribe)
- Commagene
- Çiğ köfte

== Twin towns – sister cities ==
Adıyaman is twinned with:

- Tekirdağ, Turkey
- Edirne, Turkey
- İzmir, Turkey (multiple districts)

== Sources ==
- Beihammer, Alexander Daniel (2017). Byzantium and the Emergence of Muslim Turkish Anatolia, ca. 1040-1130. Routledge. ISBN 978-1-138-22959-4.
- Strange, Guy Le (1 January 2010). The Lands of the Eastern Caliphate: Mesopotamia, Persia, and Central Asia from the Moslem Conquest to the Time of Timur. Cosimo, Inc. ISBN 978-1-61640-512-0.
