= List of bridges in Montenegro =

This list of bridges in Montenegro lists bridges of particular historical, scenic, architectural or engineering interest. Road and railway bridges, viaducts, aqueducts and footbridges are included.

== Historical and architectural interest bridges ==
	Name	Montenegrin	Distinction	Length	Type	Carries Crosses	Opened	Location	Municipality	Ref.
1	Adži-paša's Bridge	Аџи-пашин мост			Masonry; 2 arches	Footbridge; Ribnica (Morača)		Podgorica; 42°26′22.1″N 19°15′31.8″E	Podgorica Capital City	
2	Bar Aqueduct	Барски аквадукт	Only remaining aqueduct in Montenegro		Masonry; 17 arches	Aqueduct	16th century	Stari Bar; 42°05′39.7″N 19°08′09.8″E	Bar Municipality	
3	Rijeka Crnojevića Bridge	Мост на Ријеци Црнојевића		43 m (141 ft)	Masonry; 2 arches	Footbridge; Rijeka Crnojevića (river)	1853	Rijeka Crnojevića; 42°21′21.0″N 19°01′27.9″E	Cetinje	
4	Tsar's Bridge	Царев мост		269 m (883 ft)	Masonry; 18 arches	Road bridge Zeta (river)	1894	Nikšić; 42°43′49.9″N 18°57′37.2″E	Nikšić Municipality	

== Major road and railway bridges ==
This table presents the structures with spans greater than 100 meters (non-exhaustive list).

	Name	Montenegrin	Span	Length	Type	Carries Crosses	Opened	Location	Municipality	Ref.
1	Verige Bridge project	Мост Вериге	450 m (1,480 ft)	1,335 m (4,380 ft)	Cable-stayed; Concrete box girder deck, concrete pylons 90+130+450+130+90	Adriatic Highway; Bay of Kotor		Bijela–Tivat; 42°27′35″N 18°40′44″E	Herceg Novi; Tivat Municipality	
2	Moračica Bridge	Мост Морачица	190 m (620 ft)(x3)	960 m (3,150 ft)	Box girder Prestressed concrete 95+170+3x190+125	A-1 motorway Moračica		Podgorica; 42°31′50.0″N 19°20′47.2″E	Podgorica Capital City	
3	Piva Lake Bridge		180 m (590 ft)	380 m (1,250 ft)	Box girder Steel; 100+180+100	European route E762; Piva (river)		Plužine; 43°09′59.9″N 18°51′25.7″E	Plužine Municipality	
4	Mala Rijeka Viaduct	Мост изнад Мале Ријеке	151 m (495 ft)	499 m (1,637 ft)	Truss; Steel; 81+93+150+93+81	Belgrade–Bar railway Mala Rijeka River	1973	Podgorica; 42°33′11.1″N 19°23′14.5″E	Podgorica Capital City	
5	Millennium Bridge (Podgorica)	Мост Миленијум	140 m (460 ft)	173 m (568 ft)	Cable-stayed; Concrete box girder deck, concrete pylon	4 lanes road bridge Morača	2005	Podgorica; 42°26′42.8″N 19°15′29.7″E	Podgorica Capital City	
6	Đurđevića Tara Bridge	Мост на Ђурђевића Тари	116 m (381 ft)	775 m (2,543 ft)	Arch; Concrete deck arch	P4 road Tara (river)	1941	Žabljak; 43°09′00.9″N 19°17′42.3″E	Žabljak Municipality	
7	Piva River Bridge				Box girder	European route E762; Piva (river)		Mratinje; 43°17′39.2″N 18°51′07.3″E	Plužine Municipality	
8	Moscow Bridge	Московски мост		105 m (344 ft)	Arch; Steel deck arch	Footbridge; Morača	2008	Podgorica; 42°26′39.0″N 19°15′28.4″E	Podgorica Capital City	
9	Slijepac Bridge				Truss; Steel	Belgrade–Bar railway		Bijelo Polje; 42°59′32.6″N 19°40′32.6″E	Bijelo Polje Municipality	

== Notes and references ==
- Nicolas Janberg. "International Database for Civil and Structural Engineering". Structurae.com.
- Others references

== See also ==
- Transport in Montenegro
- Highways in Montenegro
- Rail transport in Montenegro
- Geography of Montenegro
