= Montenegro Pride =

Annual LGBTIQ march in Podgorica

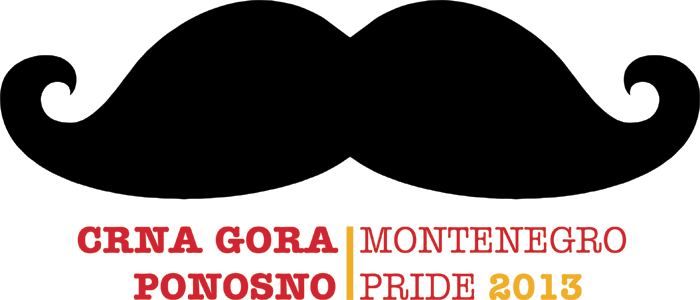
Logo for Montenegro Pride 2013

Montenegro Pride is the national LGBTIQ pride march in the city of Podgorica, the capital of Montenegro, which first took place for the first time in 2013. Since then Montenegro Pride has become an annual event. It is self-identified as an LGBTIQ pride rally.

Montenegro Pride is organized by a volunteer and grassroots Organizing Committee that is formed anew every year. The Organizing Committee of the Montenegro Pride is a non-hierarchical group and it is logistically supported by the non-governmental organization Queer Montenegro. Pride receives support and funding from various donors and sponsors.

== History ==
=== 2013 ===
The first Montenegro Pride was announced in July 2013, followed by numerous criticisms from the head of the Serbian Orthodox Church in Montenegro, Metropolitan Amfilohije Radović, who in an open letter to the organizers of the Montenegro Pride in which he mentioned the pride parade as "immoral and shameful" and declaring it as "sin instead of virtue ".

Prior to the event, a pride event, Sea Side Pride, was held in Budva on July 24. For two months following the event, there was an escalation in hate crimes in the city, with approximately reports of hate crimes filed. Due to that, and due to Radović's comments, the organizing committee of the Montenegro Pride worked intensively with police in the following months to prevent similar incidents.

After several months of negotiations with the Police Administration, the first Montenegro Pride under the message "Proudly, Montenegro" was held on October 20, 2013 in the capital Podgorica. Montenegro Pride was protected by 2,000 police officers to ensure the safety of the participants from the attempts made by extremist groups, fascists, hooligans and sports fans to break through the police cordons and attack the participants in the pride. In the clash between the police and hooligans, 60 people were injured, 20 of them police officers. There was significant damage to the city, including things like garbage containers, traffic signs, benches, and garbage cans; and several businesses in the city centre were damaged in the riots.

As a reaction to the first Montenegro Pride, the Metropolitanate of Montenegro and the Littoral organized the Petkovdan Liturgy "For the Montenegrin honour, dignity, the sanctuary of marriage and the birth of children", which was attended by a few thousand people. "God's children can only be those who guard themselves against every sin, be it visible or invisible, especially the one that has polluted this city these days."

=== 2014 ===
In anticipation of the second Montenegro Pride in Podgorica, graffiti stating "Everyone on the streets 2. 11" appeared in response to the pride parade held on the same day. Members of the Varvari fan group claimed the responsibility for the graffiti, stating that "Behind the graffiti are not only Varvari, but all citizens of Podgorica who are against the promotion of homosexuality..." As with the year before, the pride parade denounced by the Metropolitan of Montenegro and the Littoral, when Radović, again had messages filled with hate speech regarding the Parade.

On Sunday, November 1, the second pride parade was held in the capital city Podgorica under the message "Traditionally proud" with the logo of a Montenegrin woman with a moustache. About 200 people took part in the parade, including the Mayor of the capital of Podgorica, Slavoljub Stijepović, and representatives of the international community: the ambassadors of the Netherlands, Great Britain, Italy and Germany. The second pride event in Podgorica was supported by the presence of gay activists from the Balkans, as well as the Croatian singer Marina Perazić, who held a mini-concert.

The parade passed peacefully and without any incidents. The gathering was secured by about two thousand policemen, who, in addition to St. Peter Cetinjski Street and Blažo Jovanović Bridge, also blocked the surrounding streets and boulevards to ensure the safety of the participants. Police arrested sixteen people and seized Molotov cocktails, smoke bombs and batons on suspicion of planning an attack on Pride participants.

=== 2015 ===
After the Montenegrin Police Administration banned the Pride Parade in Nikšić, which was to be held in protest of series of homophobic graffiti that appeared on the building of the University of MontenegroFaculty of Philosophy in the city. Following this, the third Montenegro Pride was scheduled in Podgorica under the slogan "Montenegro Pride for every city", in reference to the decision of the police administration. This year's pride intended to decentralize LGBTIQ activism in Montenegro and increase the visibility in the rest of the country.

The political discourse of 2015 in Montenegro was marked by mass protests against the ruling regime of Milo Đukanović. This political situation presented several challenges for the organizers of the pride parade. The lack of media attention and interest of political actors in the middle of the political crisis forced the organizing committee to cancel the pride parade, which was scheduled for October 18. In the weeks that followed, the political situation in Montenegro worsened and the protests reached a critical point on October 24, just a week after the originally scheduled day.

Due to the unrest and violence of these protests, it seemed that the third pride event would not happen at all, but after the events of October 24, the situation began to calm down and conditions for a pride were once more achieved. The new date of the third pride event was scheduled for December 13, 2015. The pride event passed peacefully and without incidents, with the LGBTIQ activists, the Minister of Human and Minority Rights, the Mayor of Podgorica, representatives of the civil sector and the international community taking part. The pride moved through much of the city and ended on the Republic Square in front of the municipality building. Montenegro Pride 2015 is considered a turning point in LGBTIQ activism in Montenegro, due to it decentralizing activism and increase visibility in the rest of the country.

=== 2016 ===
The fourth Montenegrin Pride parade organized by Montenegro Pride was held on December 17, 2016. in Podgorica under the message "Family Values". About 200 people from the LGBTIQ community and supporters participated in the parade. The event was protected by strict police security, which ensured it went without any incidents.

The slogan of the fourth Pride Parade was chosen by the Pride Organizing Committee after the incident of three men beating a minor in Podgorica under the false assumption that he is a member of the LGBTIQ community, since he and his family support equal rights and regularly attend pride and related events in Montenegro. Physical attack was accompanied by death threats. In 2016. attacks on the LGBTIQ individuals were on the increase. The frequency of these attacks is a direct consequence of the negative comments and condemnations of the LGBTIQ community by the Metropolitanate of Montenegro and the Littoral and its leaders.

In addition to community members, organizers, and a large number of family members, the event was also attended by the Montenegrin Minister of Human and Minority Rights, Meto Zenka, and the Minister of Culture, Jank Ljumović. The presence of Minister Zenka, who is a member of the Albanian national minority in Montenegro, was a sign of progress in its attitudes towards the LGBTIQ community, given that his predecessor from the same minority party, Ferhat Dinosa, refused to attend the pride in 2012.

=== 2017 ===
The fifth Montenegro Pride Pride Parade was held on September 23 in Podgorica under the name "With chivalry against violence ". Chivalry and heroism are more than principles for Montenegrin society. Throughout the turbulent history of wars, the principles of chivalry and heroism have strived and transcended from mere principles into a lifestyle and a tradition of true values nurtured by generations of Montenegrins. "Heroism is when I defend myself from another, chivalry is when I defend another from myself," said Marko Miljanov. Message of the Pride but also its logo – medal, order for chivalry, heroism and above all humanity were directly influenced by these principles.

The pride event was attended by hundreds of LGBTIQ activists from Montenegro and the region. In addition to people from the community, the event was attended by a large number of representatives of state institutions, municipal services, international institutions, diplomats, and individuals from the non-governmental sector who are committed to reducing discrimination against vulnerable groups and combating all forms of violence. This year's route was different from the previous ones, moving through Njegoševa Street, Novaka Miloševa Street and Slobode Street.

The message of the pride parade was meant to refer to the long-standing struggle of the LGBTIQ community against violence. However, it also referred to the solidarity with other vulnerable and marginalized groups in Montenegrin society. "Not only violence against us, but violence against everyone. This Pride is for all groups exposed to violence. We who are engaged in activism in Montenegro have seen a lot in previous years. We have seen injured heads, fractured skulls, situations and scenes that are unimaginable. This is something we live with daily. Although we are becoming more visible with each passing day, the violence is also on the increase," said Danijel Kalezic, a member of the Organizing Committee of Montenegro Pride.

This year's Pride Parade was attended by a much smaller number of members of the Police Directorate who were in charge of securing the event. No incidents were reported. Unlike previous years, the organizers of this year's Pride did not personally invite representatives of institutions and politicians, out of the belief that everyone should take part in pride because of sincere support, and not for collecting political points or media attention.

=== 2018 ===
The Sixth Montenegro Pride parade was held on November 17 in Podgorica with the participation of over 200 LGBTIQ activists, friends of the community, representatives of the civil sector, political parties and the Government of Montenegro. The parade was also attended by the director of the Police Administration, Veselin Veljović, and his associates. Despite minimal police escort, the event had no recorded incidents.

The pride was held under the slogan "Break the chains". The meaning behind the message, according to Organizing Committee member, Marija Jovanović, is the effort to make the sixth Montenegro Pride a safe place to which all citizens of Montenegro are invited. "All that is needed is for you to come, to show bravely and decisively that together we can put an end to the chains made up of patriarchy, sexism, racism, xenophobia, transphobia, homophobia and all other forms of oppression," Jovanovic said. The organizers of the Montenegro Pride made clear demands, the most important of which referred to the civil partnership legislation being drafted by the Parliament in the coming weeks.

=== 2019 ===
The seventh Montenegro Pride parade was held on September 21, 2019 in Podgorica under the slogan "Not over our backs". The slogan came after MPs from the minority parties that make up the ruling coalition voted against the Law on Same-Sex Partnerships, which was proposed by the government. Voting was cast with the absence of opposition party MPs, who include LGBTIQ rights in their political programs. Montenegro Pride 2019 was the most numerous and the route was significantly longer. One of the main demands of the Montenegro Pride was that politicians, especially members of parliament, stop calculating human rights and use them for inter-party games.

"I have the right that representatives of the people do not use my identity as an insult to each other. I have the right to live my life authentically, and to live freely with the community to which I belong without being manipulated with." Jovan Džoli Ulićević

The Pride occurred without any incidents, and it was followed by a concert of the Croatian band "Nipplepeople", which was organized in cooperation with the Podgorica Art Festival.

=== 2020 ===
The 8th Montenegro pride parade was held on 20 December under the slogan ‘’I am a symbol of resistance’’. Due to the COVID-19 pandemic and public health concerns, the parade was reconfigured for people to attend in their own cars. The idea was based on wedding car parades, also known as svatovi which are part of the Balkans wedding traditions. In this way, 8th Montenegro pride was partially a celebration of the newly adopted same-sex partnership law that passed in Montenegrin parliament in July earlier that year. The convoy of cars started from the city centre and traveled to the city district.

Pride week lockdown edition was held online and activities included online gatherings, film evenings, workshops, speed dating, and the first online Montenegro Pride parties and exhibitions. As a sign of support for the LGBTIQ community, Podgorica, for the first time, illuminated the Millennium Bridge with rainbow colours, as well as the buildings of the President of Montenegro and the Ministry of the Interior. By illuminating recognizable buildings and institutions, the mayor of Podgorica, Ivan Vuković, the President of Montenegro, Milo Đukanović, and the Ministry of Interior gave symbolic but significant support to the Montenegro pride parade.

Months prior to the 8th Montenegro pride parade, Montenegrin society was faced with the rise of hate speech against LGBTIQ people. During parliament discussions about same-sex partnership law, same-sex attraction was compared to paraphilic sexual tendencies such as zoophilia and paedophilia. The slogan, "I am a symbol of resistance", was created as an answer to the rising clerofascist political ideologies that were emerging from Montenegro's political and social structures. After the newly elected prime minister of Montenegro, Zdravko Krivokapić, stated that terrorist Nikola Kavaja was a "symbol of resistance", the organising committee of Montenegro pride decided to reclaim these words and put them in the anti-fascist context. They explained that despite daily discrimination, violence, insults and non-acceptance of LGBTIQ persons, just with their existence, are a symbol of resistance to homophobia, transphobia, patriarchy, exploitation, theocracy and autocracy, marginalization, violence, to the war narrative, dogma, regression, prejudice, stereotypes to the vampirization of fascism, hate, social inequality and degradation of human rights.
