= Gabrovica pri Črnem Kalu =

- Location in Slovenia
- Coordinates: 45°33′36.42″N 13°51′49.55″E
- Country: Slovenia
- Traditional region: Littoral
- Statistical region: Coastal–Karst
- Municipality: Koper

Area
  - Total: 2.53 km^{2} (0.98 sq mi)
- Elevation: 73.4 m (241 ft)

Population (2002)
  - Total: 76

Gabrovica (pronounced [ˈɡaːbɾɔʋitsa pɾi ˈtʃəɾnɛm ˈkaːlu]; Italian: Gabrovizza) is a settlement near Črni Kal in the City Municipality of Koper in the Littoral region of Slovenia. It lies below the Črni Kal Viaduct.

== Name ==
The name of the settlement was changed from Gabrovica to Gabrovica pri Črnem Kalu in 1953.

== Church ==
The local church is dedicated to Saint Nicholas and belongs to the Parish of Osp.
