= Old Bar Fortress =

The Old Bar Fortress may refer to:

- A somewhat intact fortification in Stari Bar, Montenegro
- Ruins of a fortress in Bar, Ukraine
