= Moscow Bridge =

Pedestrian bridge in Podgorica, Montenegro

Coordinates: 42.4441°N 19.2579°E

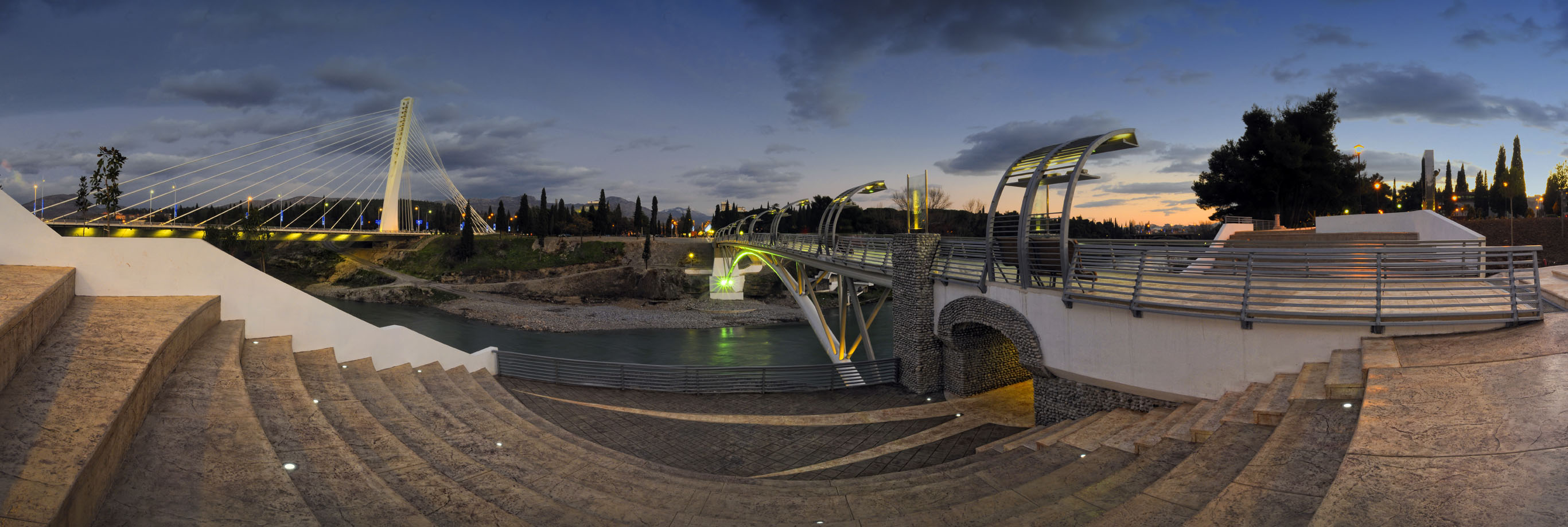
A panoramic view of the Moscow Bridge (right) and the Millennium Bridge (left)

The Moscow Bridge (Montenegrin: Московски мост, romanized: Moskovski most) is a pedestrian bridge that spans the river Morača in Podgorica, the capital city of Montenegro.

== Description ==
The metal construction of the bridge was a gift by the city of Moscow to the people of Montenegro. It measures 105 meters long, and its construction cost around 2.2 million euros. It was officially opened on 19 December 2008, by the Montenegrin president Filip Vujanović, Podgorica Mayor Miomir Mugoša, and Aleksey Aleksandrov, head of the Central Administrative Okrug of Moscow.

== Construction ==
Moskovski bridge connects the Hercegovačka street with the monument to Vladimir Vysotsky, a famous Soviet singer, songwriter, poet, and actor. The main project was designed by the Russian Giprostroymost Institute, with the help of the Faculty of Civil Engineering of Podgorica. It was built by Energomash from Belgorod, Russia, Intermost from Belgrade, Serbia and Bomanite from Budva, Montenegro.

== See also ==
- Montenegro–Russia relations
- Millennium Bridge
- Blažo Jovanović Bridge
