= Marjan Pipenbaher =

Slovenian civil engineer

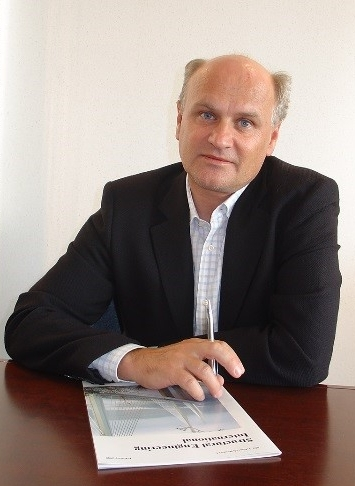
- Marjan Pipenbaher (2021)
- Born: 22 August 1957 (age 68); Ljubljana, PR Slovenia, FPR Yugoslavia
- Education: Faculty of Civil Engineering, University of Maribor
- Engineering career
- Discipline: Civil engineer
- Institutions: Slovenian Association of Civil Engineering (IZS); International Association for Bridge and Structural Engineering (IABSE); Fédération Internationale du Béton (FIB); Slovenian Association of Structural Engineers (SDGK)
- Practice name: Ponting Bridges, Pipenbaher Consulting Engineers
- Projects: Pelješac Bridge, Croatia; Črni Kal Viaduct, Slovenia; Millennium, Montenegro; Nissibi Euphrates Bridge, Turkey

Marjan Pipenbaher (born 22 August 1957) is a Slovenian structural engineer and bridge specialist.

== Career ==
Pipenbaher graduated from the Faculty of Civil Engineering, University of Maribor in 1981. From 1980, he worked at the Gradis Design Office where he participated in designing of several large bridges and viaducts constructed by Gradis. In 1990, he and Viktor Markelj founded Ponting Bridges, a Slovenian studio for structural engineering, focusing mainly on bridge structures, with headquarters in Maribor. The practice is led by Markelj and Pipenbaher, and has constructed many high-profile bridges. Since 2002, he is also founder and CEO of specialized design and research company Pipenbaher Consulting Engineers.

His high-profile bridges include Pelješac Bridge in Croatia (2022), Nissibi Euphrates Bridge in Turkey (2015), and Črni Kal Viaduct in Slovenia (2004). He lives in Slovenska Bistrica.

He is a lecturer at the Faculty of Civil Engineering in Maribor since 2000, in the field of prestressed concrete structures and bridges. He began there as an assistant in 1986.

== Major projects ==
Major projects, by year of completion and ordered by type, are:

=== Bridges ===
- Carinthian bridge, Maribor, Slovenia (1996)
- Črni Kal Viaduct, Slovenia (2004)
- Viaduct Bivje, Slovenia (2004)
- Millennium Bridge, Podgorica, Montenegro (2006)
- Viaduct Bonifika, Koper, Slovenia (2007)
- Viaduct Dobruša, Slovenia (2010)
- Peračica viaducts, Slovenia (2012)
- Giborim bridge, Haifa, Israel (2012)
- Nissibi Euphrates Bridge, highway Adiyaman - Diyarbakir, Turkey (2015)
- High speed railway bridge no. 10, HSR Tel Aviv - Jerusalem, Israel (2017)
- New Kömürhan Bridge, Turkey (2021)
- Pelješac Bridge, Croatia (2022)

=== Pedestrian and cyclist bridges ===
- Footbridge in Ptuj, Slovenia (1997)

=== Current ===
- Highway bridge and parallel pedestrian bridge over Krka river, Slovenia (detailed design)

=== Selected works ===
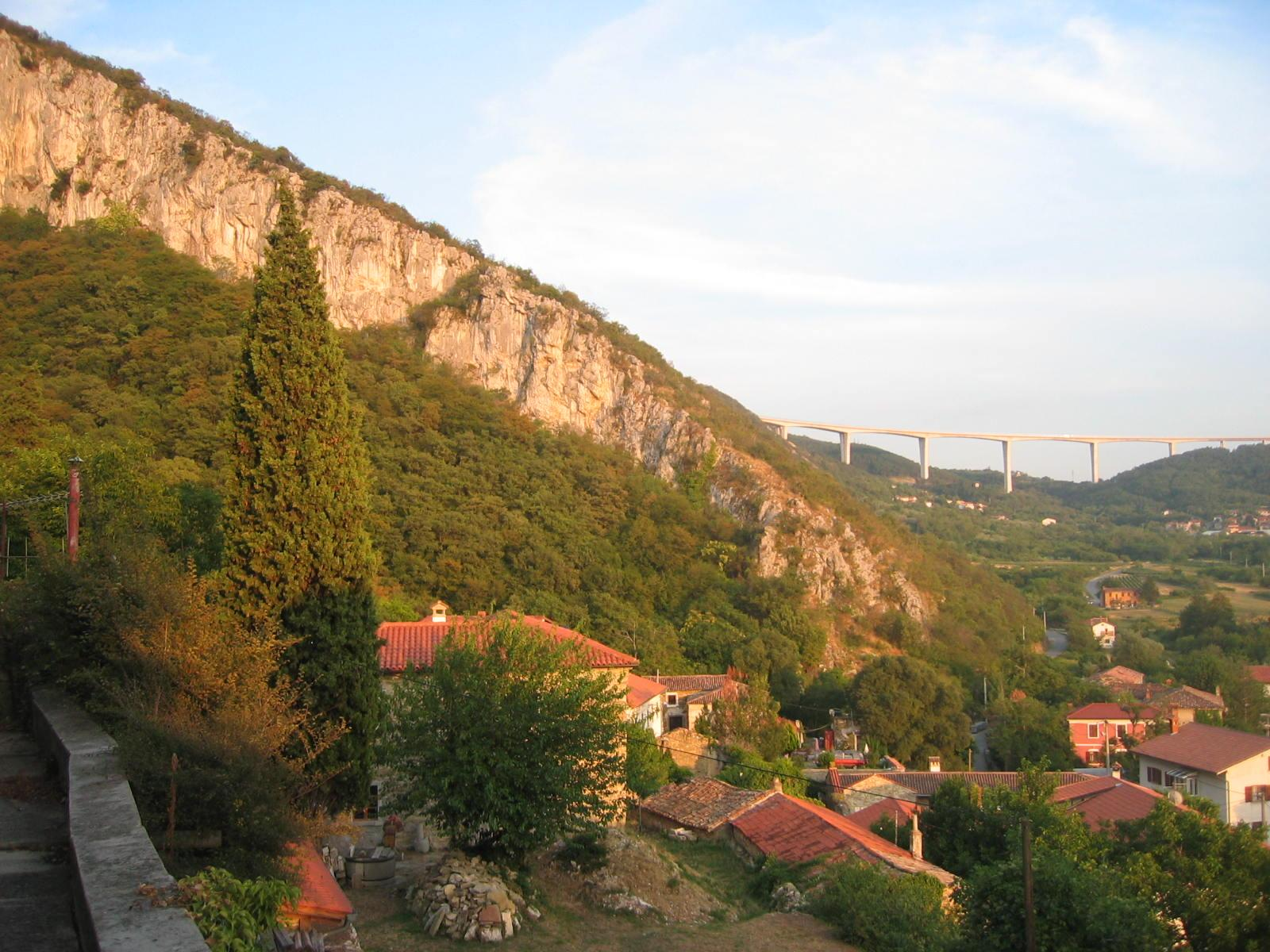
Črni Kal Viaduct, Slovenia (2004)

Millennium Bridge, Podgorica, Montenegro (2006)

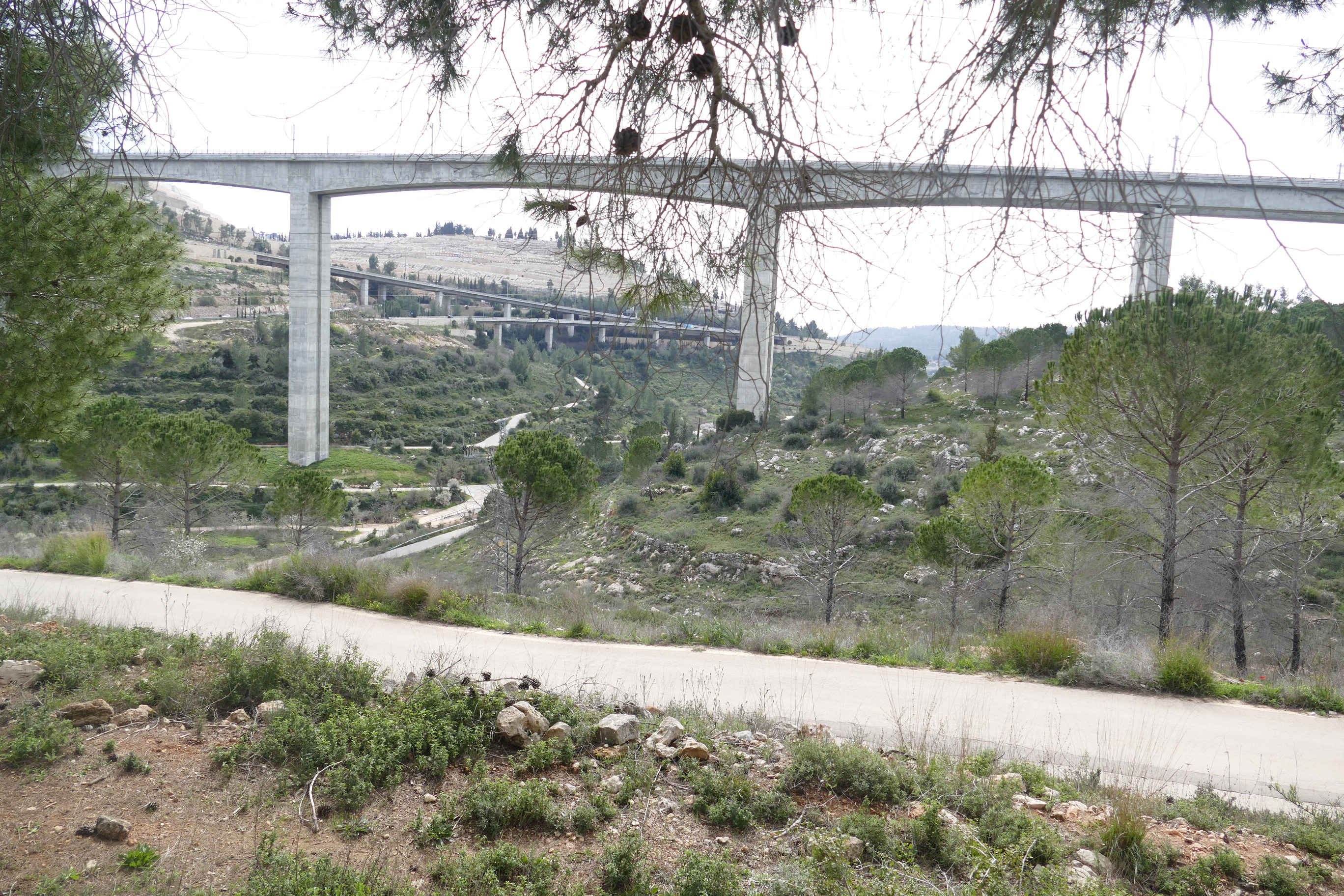
High speed railway bridge no. 10, HSR Tel Aviv - Jerusalem, Izrael (2017)

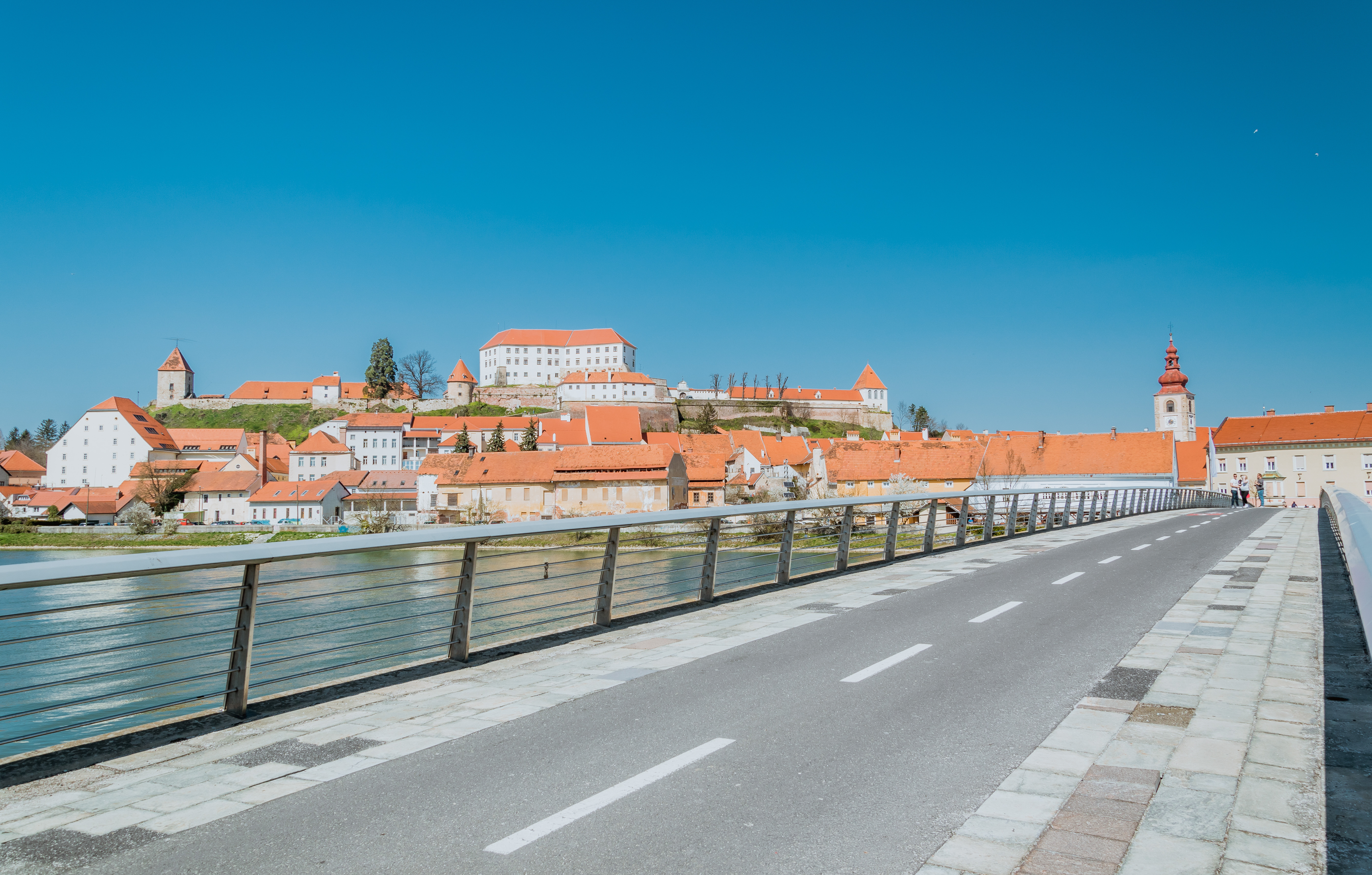
Footbridge in Ptuj, Slovenia (1997)

Bridge over Kamniška Bistrica in Kamnik, Slovenia (2010)

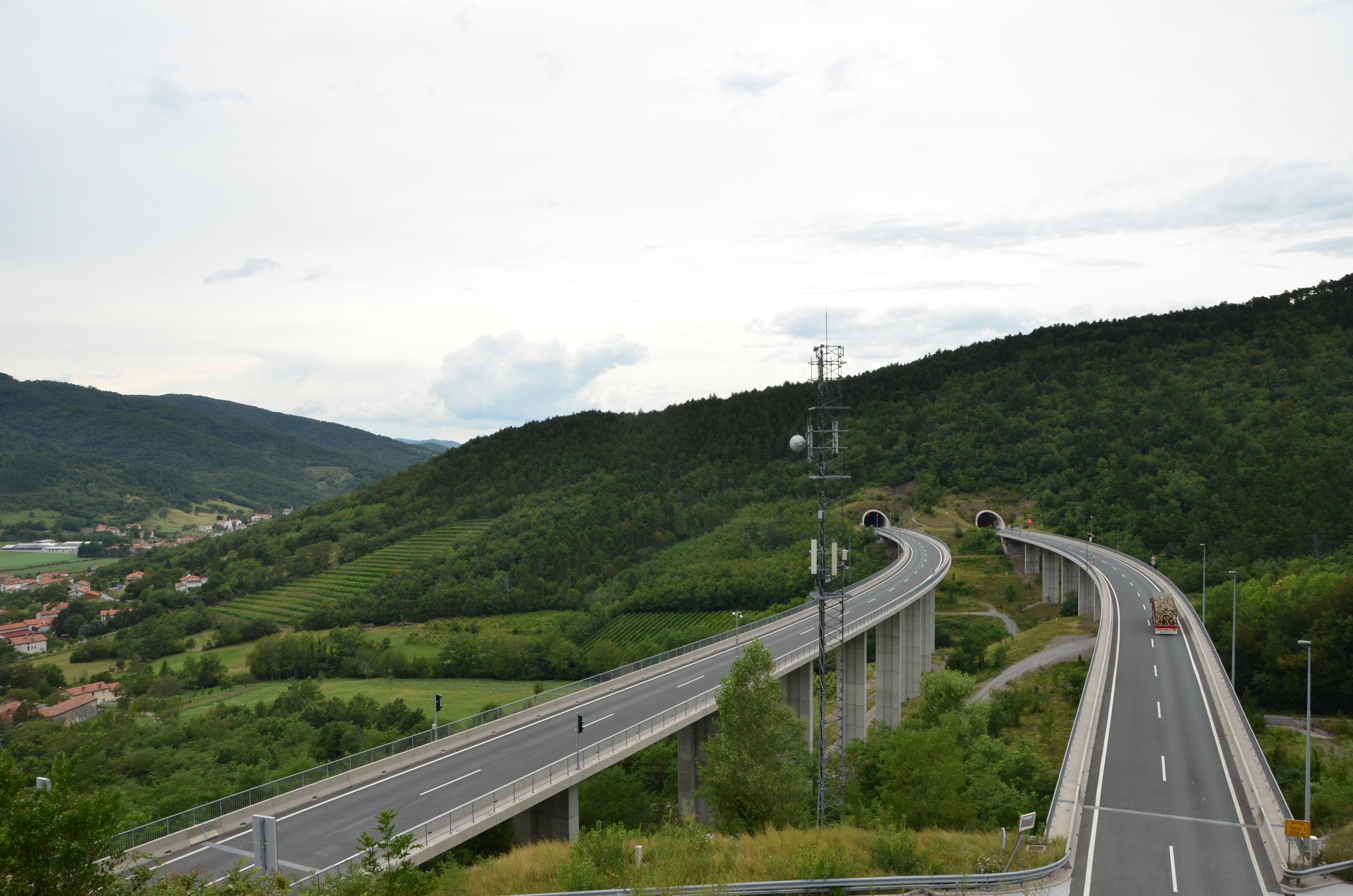
Viaducts Tabor 1 and Tabor 2, Rebernice, Slovenia (2009)

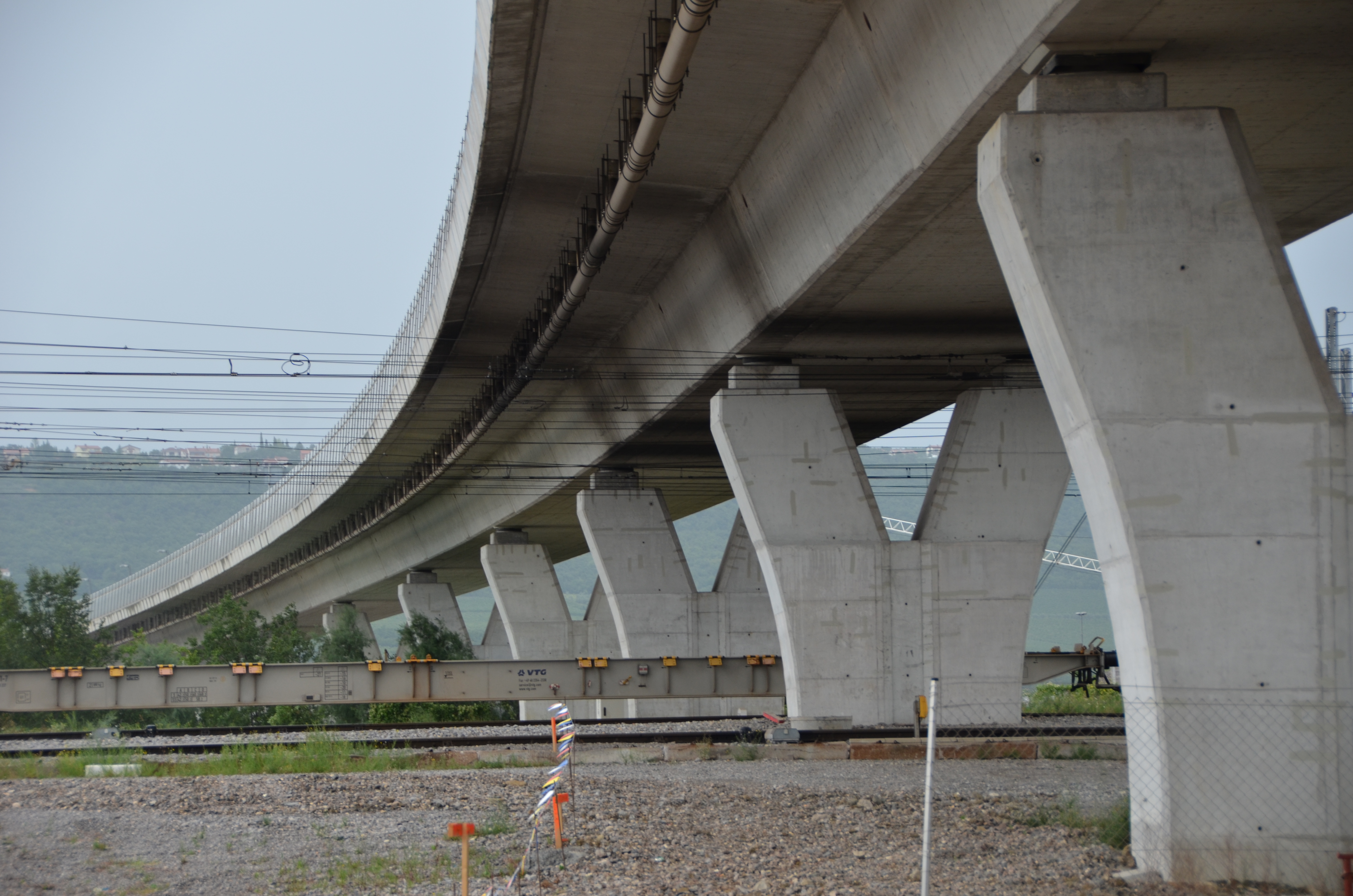
Viadukt Bonifika in Koper, Slovenia (2008)

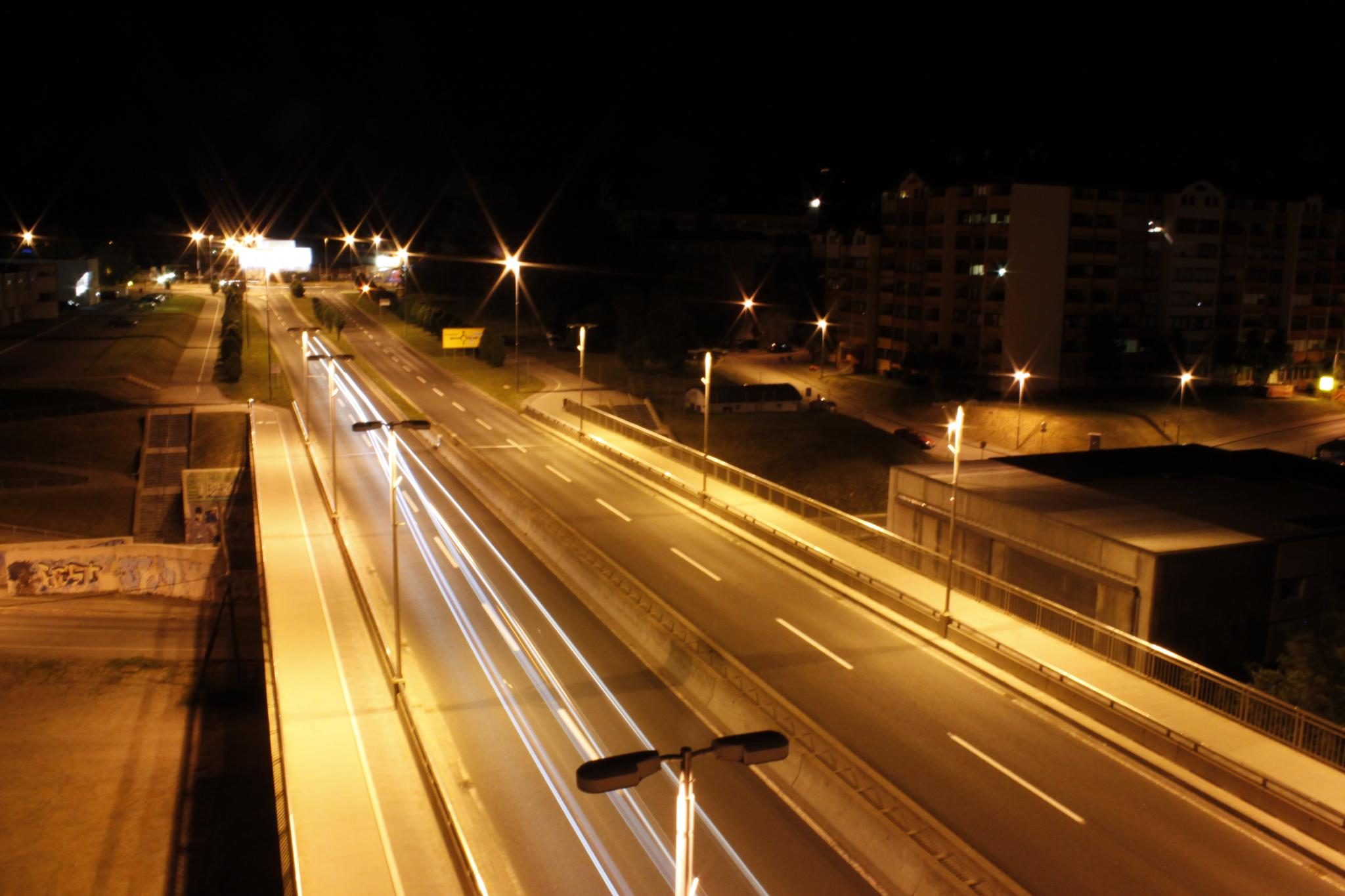
Koroški most, Maribor, Slovenia (1996)

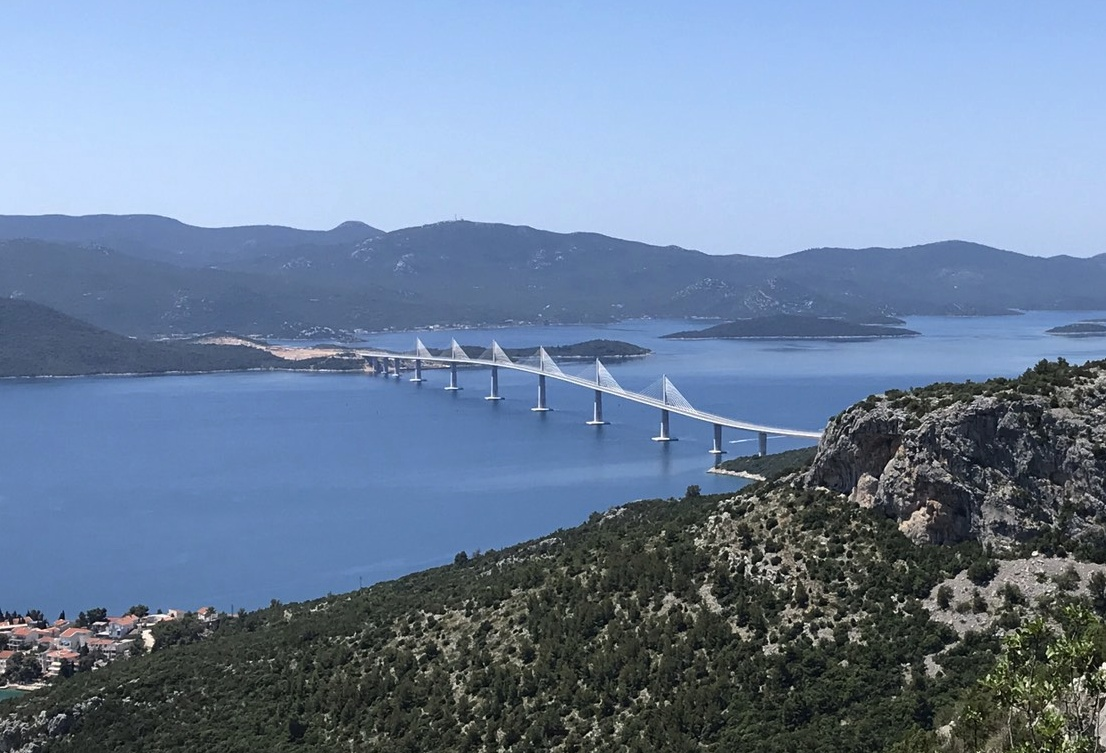
Pelješac Bridge in Croatia (2022)

== Awards ==
- 2022 Kolos awards for exceptional achievements in civil engineering for the Pelješac Bridge project
- 2021 The Newspaper Finances' Award for Special Achievements
- 2019 Jožef Mrak Award for Pelješac Bridge
- 2019 Honorary City Certificate of Slovenska Bistrica to Dr. Viktor Markelj and Marjan Pipenbaher
- 2004 UM Award 2004: Golden recognition award to Mr. Marjan Pipenbaher and Mr. Viktor Markelj
- 1999 Award CSS of CCIS to Footbridge in Ptuj
