= 1979 Montenegro earthquake =

Earthquake in SR Montenegro, Yugoslavia

- Location within Yugoslavia Location within Montenegro
- UTC time: 1979-04-15 06:19:44
- ISC event: 666588
- USGS-ANSS: ComCat
- Local date: April 15, 1979
- Local time: 07:19:44
- Magnitude: 6.9 M_{w}
- Depth: 10 km (6.2 mi)
- Epicenter: Pečurice 42.03°N 19.17°E
- Areas affected: Montenegro, Albania, Croatia
- Max. intensity: MMI X (Extreme)
- Peak acceleration: 0.46 g
- Tsunami: 0.6 m (2 ft 0 in)
- Aftershocks: 6.3 M_{s} May 24 at 17:23 UTC
- Casualties: 136 dead 1,000+ injured

The 1979 Montenegro earthquake occurred on 15 April at 06:19 UTC with a moment magnitude of 6.9 and a maximum Mercalli intensity of X (Extreme). It was the most devastating earthquake in SR Montenegro, then part of Yugoslavia, and was mostly felt along the Montenegrin and Albanian coastline. It was also felt in other parts of the country (in Podgorica and Dubrovnik with intensity of VII, in Sarajevo and Skopje V-VI, in Belgrade IV, in Zagreb and Ljubljana III-IV).

The main earthquake was followed by more than 90 aftershocks stronger than 4.0 on Richter scale, strongest of which occurred on 24 May 1979, with a magnitude of 6.3.

== Damage ==
Budva's Old Town, one of Montenegro's Cultural Heritage Sites, was heavily devastated. Of the 400 buildings in Budva's Old Town, 8 remained unscathed from the earthquake. The 15th century walls and ramparts protecting the Old Town were severely damaged as well. Praskvica Monastery, located between Miločer and Sveti Stefan in the Budva Municipality, suffered greatly too. The church inside the monastery had all but totally collapsed, whereas the frescoes in the monastery were completely damaged.

The walls surrounding Stari Bar had suffered very little damage from the earthquake, in comparison to the Aqueduct in Stari Bar which was completely destroyed. Herceg Novi, the youngest town on the Montenegrin coast, suffered heavily as well. Parts of the walls of Herceg Novi's Old Town fell into the Adriatic Sea. Ulcinj's Old Town, another Montenegrin Cultural Heritage Site, was almost totally devastated. The centuries-old Balšić Tower in Ulcinj nearly collapsed as a result of the earthquake.

Over 450 villages were razed to the ground. In addition, many villages in the regions of Crmnica, Grbalj, Krajina and Paštrovići were in danger of near total collapse. Further inland, Cetinje, Danilovgrad, Nikšić and Montenegro's capital city, Titograd (present Podgorica) were damaged as well, but not as severely.

Even areas outside Montenegro and Albania suffered damage. 1,071 buildings were damaged in Dubrovnik, Croatia, including the Walls of Dubrovnik. In villages in Konavle and Župa Dubrovačka, south of Dubrovnik which were built on unsecured mountain slopes, 80% of houses were uninhabitable. In 1980, total damage in the Dubrovnik area was estimated at US$436,5 million.

According to a 1984 UNESCO report, a total of 1,487 objects were damaged, nearly half of which consisted of households and another 40% consisting of churches and other sacred properties. Only 30% of the 1,487 objects damaged were destroyed. Over 1,000 cultural monuments were suffered, as well as thousands of works of art and valuable collections.

By the end of the catastrophe, 101 people had died in Montenegro and 35 in Albania and over 100,000 people were left homeless.

=== Aid and relief ===
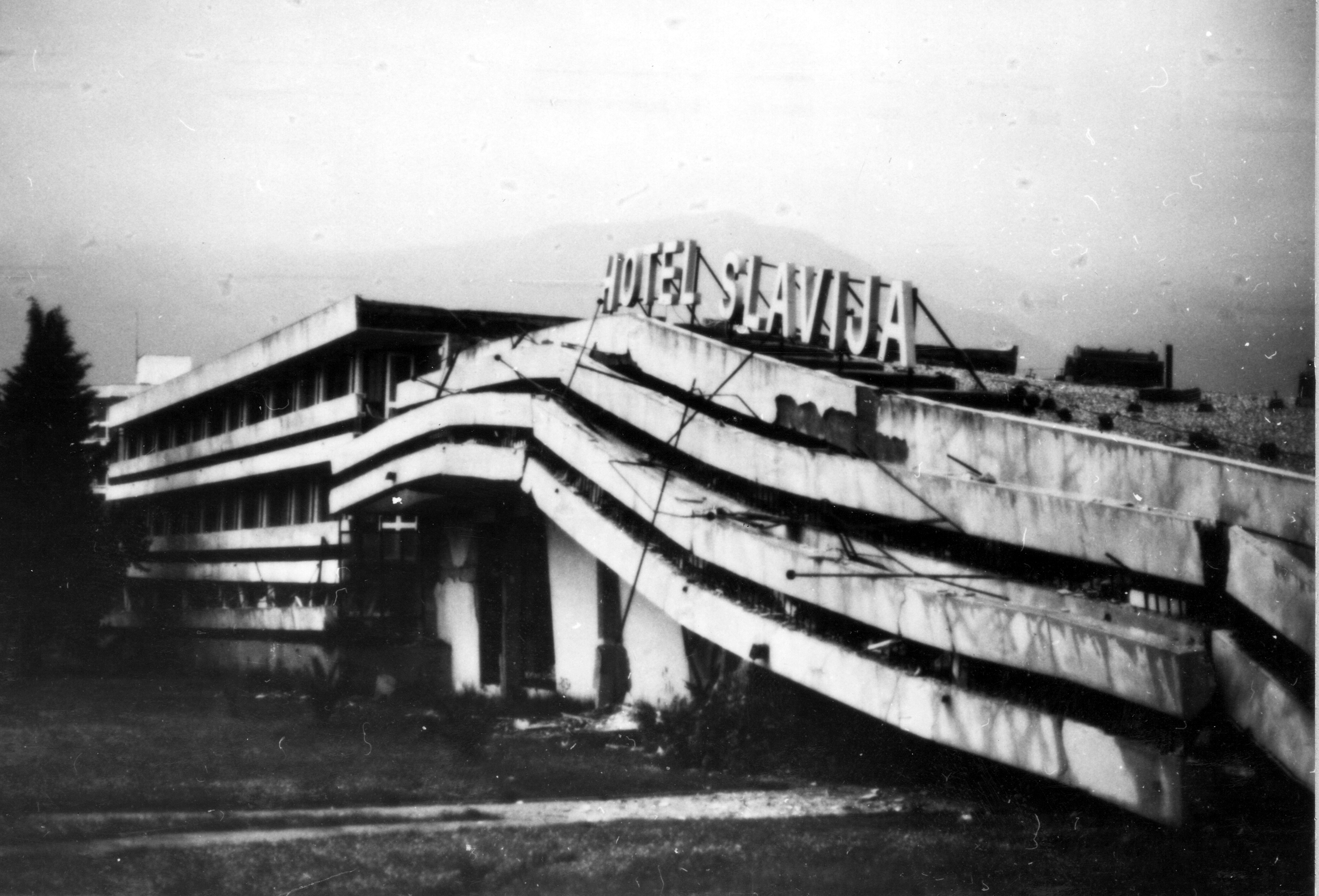
Damage done to Hotel Slavija in Budva

Days after the earthquake, $30,000 was made available immediately for aid work and restoration of disaster areas. On 28 May 1979, the Director-General of UNESCO issued a worldwide appeal for donations to help the nation recover for the devastation as the federal budget was insufficient for aid funding.

Several months later, in October 1979, the World Heritage Committee of UNESCO decided to list the Natural and Culturo-historical Region of Kotor in the World Heritage List and in the List of World Heritage in Danger.

UNESCO, through ICCROM, aided the Republic Institute for the Protection of Cultural Monuments in Cetinje for the restoration of frescoes in the Church of the Virgin in Podlastva Monastery. Similar help was given for the restoration of the Church of Alexander Nevsky on the island of Sveti Stefan.

First estimates of the cost of damaged cultural property was about 10,527,690,000 Yugoslav dinars (US$10.5 billion), which is just under 15% of the total earthquake damage. The 1984 inflation rates put that amount at about 3,174,098,500,000 dinars (3.1 trillion), equaling to US$31,700,000,000 ($31 billion). The Yugoslav Government agreed to pay 82% of the total estimated cost of damaged cultural property, whereas the remaining 18% was to be paid by the local municipalities. To help meet the total costs of the disaster, the Government had set up a statutory fund whereby each worker across SFR Yugoslavia contributed 1% of his monthly salary towards the restoration effort in a ten-year period, from 1979 to 1989.

Until September 1983, the Government had budgeted for a total expenditure of 54,722,849,000 dinars (54.7 billion), of which 3.7% or 21,023,620,800 dinars (21 billion) were allocated for cultural property.

By 1984, Montenegro was still under restoration, the entire Montenegrin coast, especially Budva and Kotor, and Cetinje receiving the heaviest amounts of restoration. Several objects had been fully restored by 1984, including the Memorial Museum of Jovan Tomasevic in Bar; Monastery of St. Vid and Church of St. Alexander Nevsky in Budva; Republic Institute for the Protection of Cultural Monuments (former Austrian embassy), State Museum (former Palace of King Nicholas), National Gallery and the Bishop's House in Cetinje; the Archives and Gallery of Josip Bepo Benkovic in Herceg Novi, Cultural Center in Kotor, Church of St. George in Orahovac (Kotor), Church of Our Lady in Krimovice (Kotor), Church of St. John in Dub (Kotor), Church of St. George in Sisici (Kotor), Church of St. George in Sutvara (Kotor), Church of St. George in Prijeradi (Kotor), Church of St. Eustacius in Dobrota (Kotor), Church of Our Lady of the Rocks in Perast (Kotor), Roman mosaics in Risan (Kotor) and twelve church buildings in Grbalj (Kotor).

== See also ==
- List of earthquakes in 1979
  - List of earthquakes in Albania
  - List of earthquakes in Croatia
