= Črni Kal Viaduct =

Črni Kal Viaduct Viadukt Črni Kal
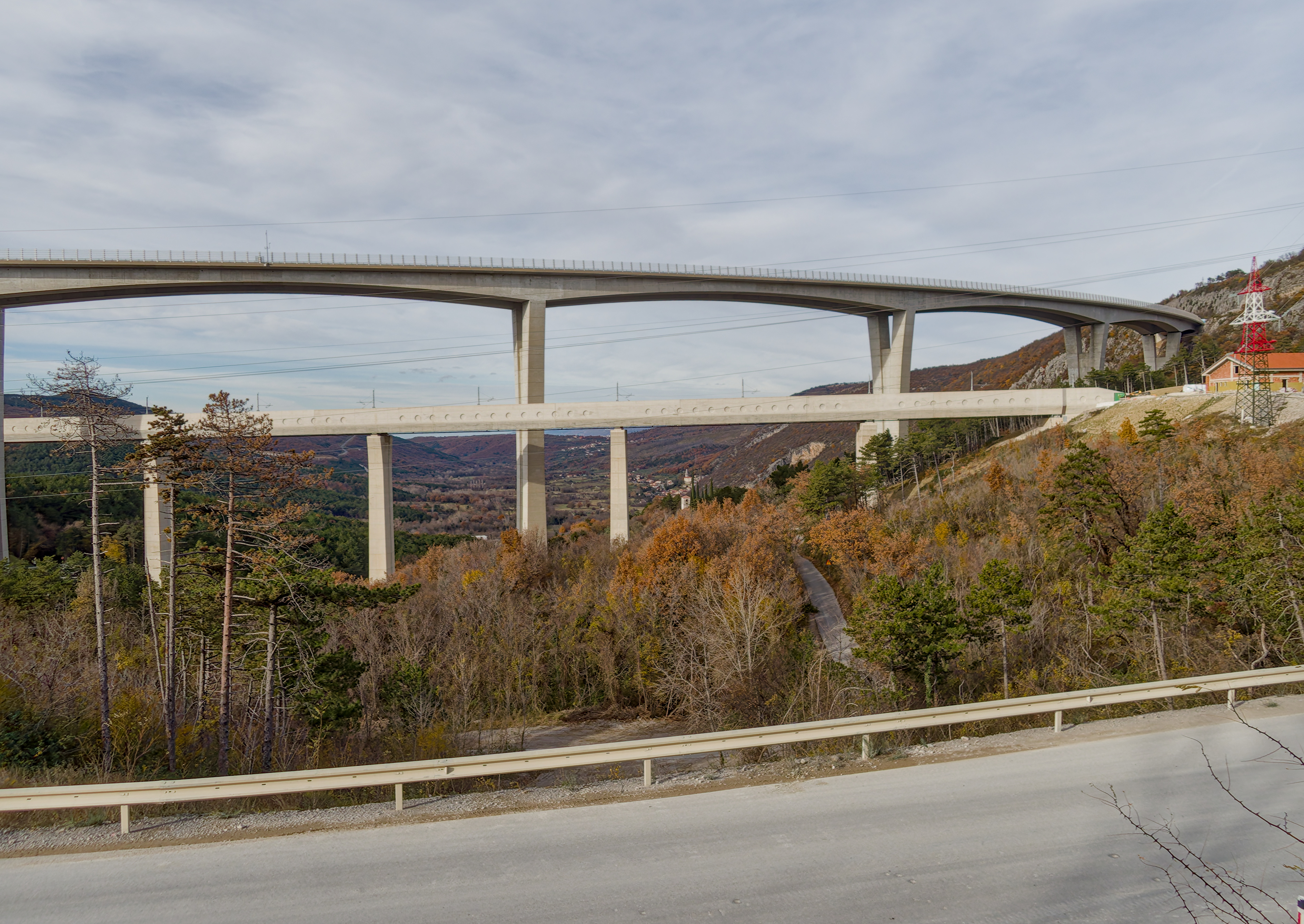
- The Črni Kal Viaduct (above) with a newer railway Viaduct Gabrovica
- Coordinates: 45°33′26.98″N 13°52′16.33″E
- Carries: A1 motorway
- Crosses: Osp Valley
- Locale: Gabrovica, Slovenia

Characteristics
- Total length: 1,065 m (3,494 ft)
- Width: 26.5 m (87 ft)
- Height: from 10 m (33 ft) to 95 m (312 ft)
- Longest span: 140 m (460 ft)
- Load limit: 4 lanes, 2 emergency lanes

History
- Construction start: September 2001
- Construction end: September 2004
- Opened: 24 September 2004

Statistics
- Daily traffic: 19,606 vehicles

Location
- Interactive map of Črni Kal Viaduct

The Črni Kal Viaduct (Slovene: Viadukt Črni Kal) is the longest and the highest viaduct in Slovenia. It is located on the A1 motorway above the Osp Valley near the village of Gabrovica, about 20 kilometres (12 mi) east of Koper. It is named after the village of Črni Kal. The viaduct is 1,065 metres (3,494 ft) long and is mounted on 11 Y-shaped columns (its distinguishing feature), the highest reaching 87.5 m (287 ft).

The viaduct was designed by Janez Koželj and Marjan Pipenbaher, who was also its constructor. The construction work began in 2001 and the viaduct was opened for traffic on 23 September 2004. When almost completed in May 2004, it served as a stage of the Giro d'Italia race.
