= Bar Aqueduct =

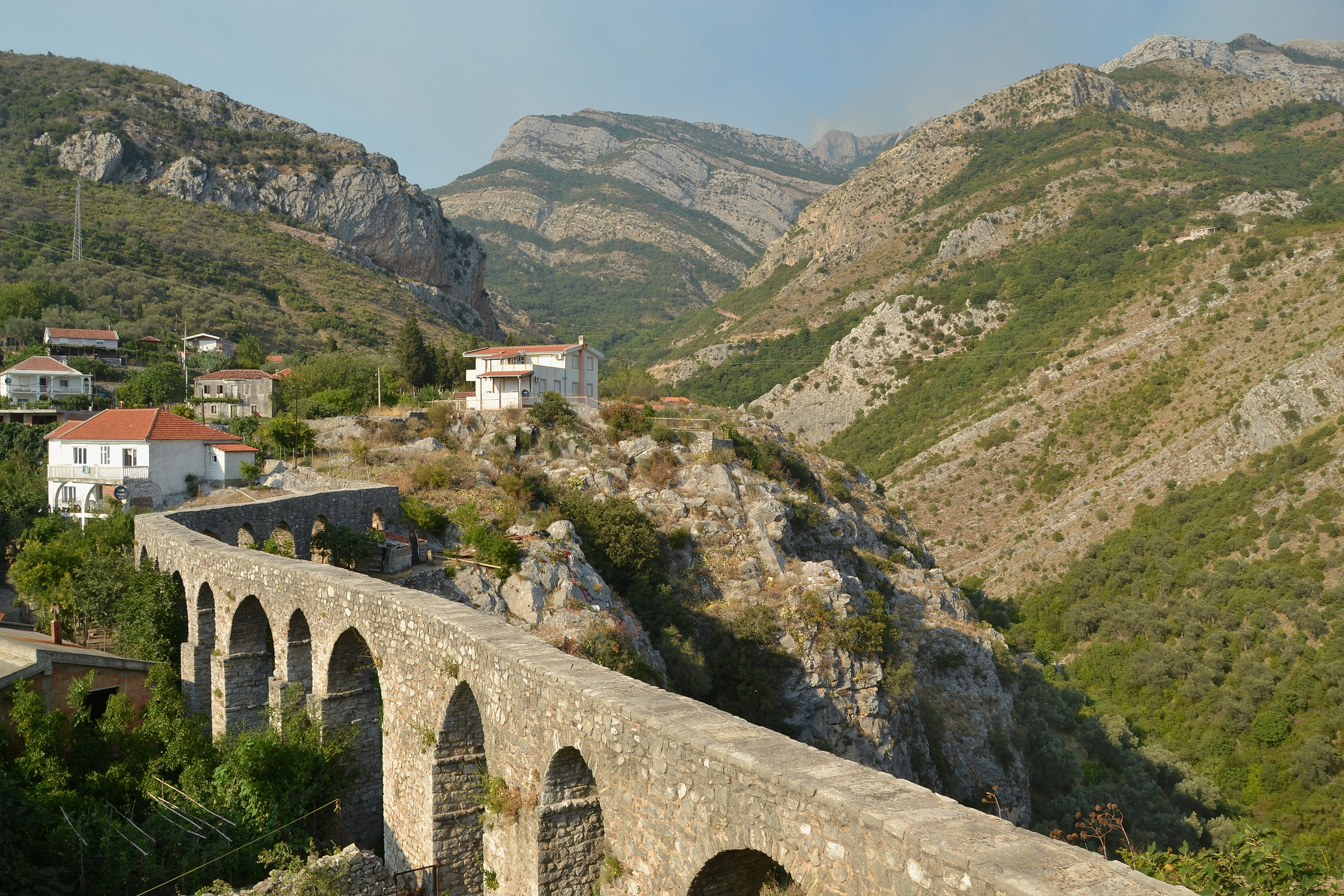
- Today's remains of Bar Aqueduct
- Coordinates: 42°05′39″N 19°08′10″E
- Locale: Stari Bar near Bar, Montenegro

Characteristics
- Material: Stone

History
- Construction end: during the reign of Ottomans (16th century - 17th century

The Bar Aqueduct (Montenegrin: Барски аквадукт, romanized: Barski akvadukt) is a stone aqueduct located on the northern side of Stari Bar Fortress, 4 km north of the town of Bar in Montenegro. The Bar Aqueduct is the only remaining aqueduct in Montenegro, and one of the largest and best preserved aqueducts from the three remaining ones in the former Yugoslavia, which include the Diocletianus Aqueduct near Split, Croatia and the Skopje Aqueduct in North Macedonia.

== History ==
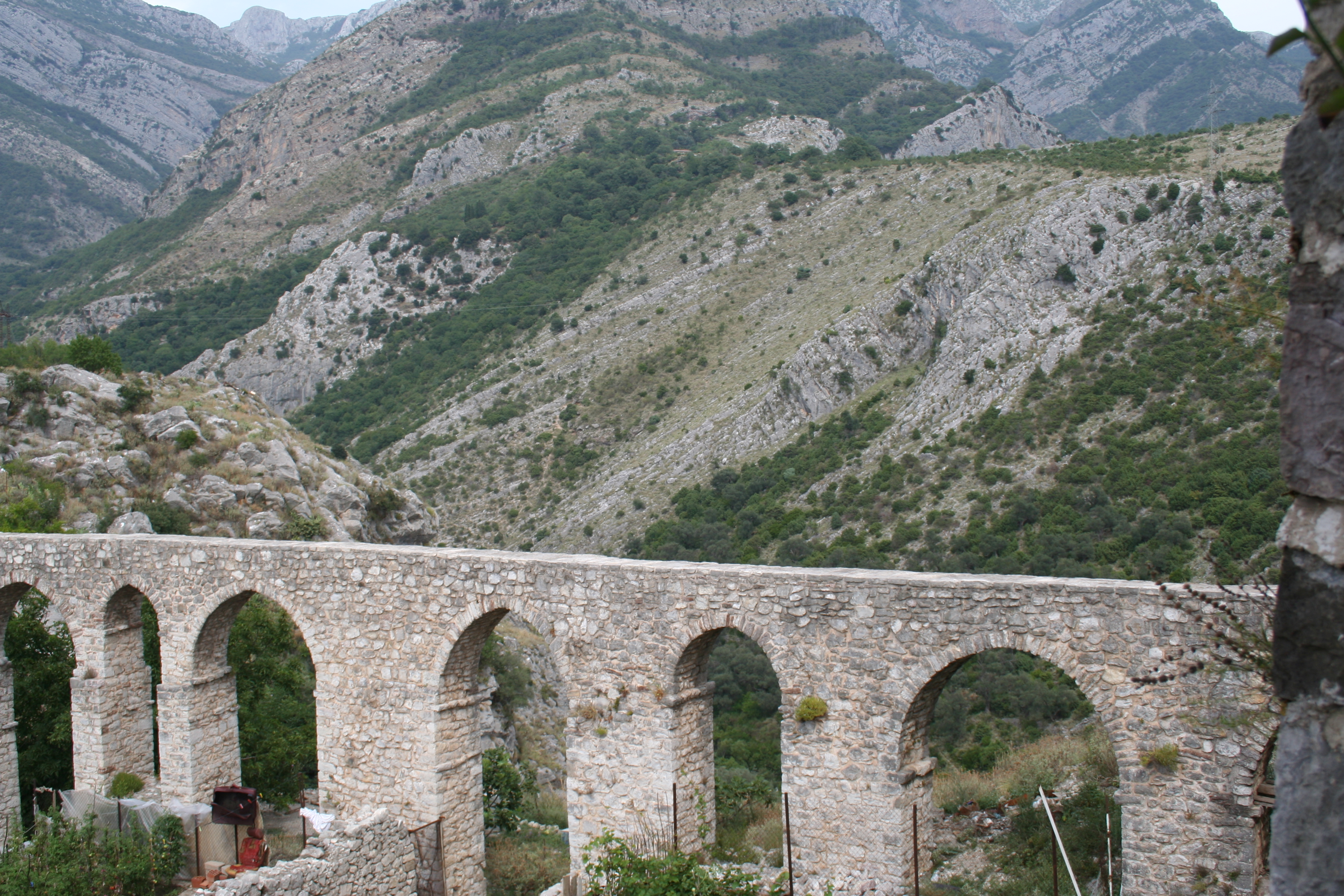
Bar Aqueduct

The aqueduct was constructed during the governance of the Ottoman Empire, in the 16th century, and included a bridge across a valley. It served as the water supply for Stari Bar, bringing water 3 km from a spring on Mount Rumija. The structure of the aqueduct bridge consists of seventeen large arches of varying widths, which are supported on eighteen massive pillars. The water channel is formed on the upper surface of the aqueduct, where jointly connected stoneware pipes were placed, each being about 12 cm in diameter and 30 cm long. The entire construction is made of broken and roughly hewn stone.

After the devastating Montenegro earthquake in 1979 on April 15, at 06:19, the aqueduct was completely destroyed.
Later on it was completely renovated, so it can even be used to this day.

== See also ==
- List of bridges in Montenegro
