= Rijeka Crnojevića =

Town in Central Montenegro

Rijeka Crnojevića Ријека Црнојевића
- Town
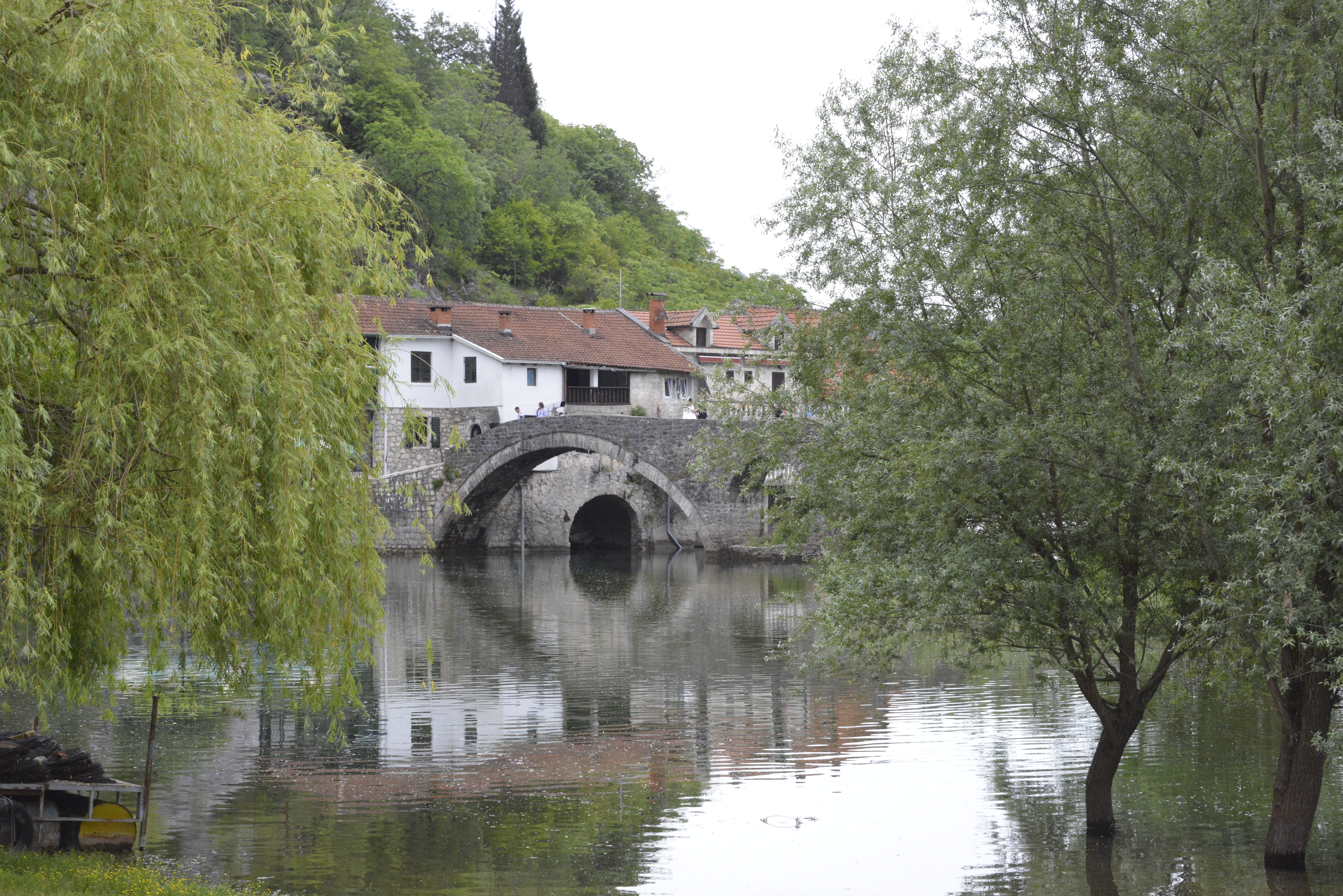
- View towards an old bridge

- Location within Montenegro
- Coordinates: 42°21′N 19°2′E
- Country: Montenegro
- Region: Central
- Municipality: Old Royal Capital Cetinje

Population (2011)
  - Total: 175
- Time zone: UTC+1 (CET)
  - Summer (DST): UTC+2 (CEST)

Rijeka Crnojevića (Montenegrin Cyrillic: Ријека Црнојевића, lit. 'River of Crnojević') is a town in Montenegro on the eponymous Rijeka Crnojevića River, near the shore of Lake Skadar. Town is placed in Cetinje Municipality with proximity to Podgorica.

== History ==
The Ottomans captured Žabljak Crnojevića in 1478 after they had defeated the main army of Ivan Crnojević in late 1477 or early 1478. Ivan moved his seat to Obod (fortified by him in 1475) which was soon renamed to Rijeka Crnojevića, and became the new capital of Montenegro.

Rijeka housed the Crnojević printing house which printed the first books in south east of Europe.

Rijeka Crnojevića was the historical seat of the Riječka nahija, one of the four territorial units of Old Montenegro.

The town used to the second most important town in Montenegro, with residence of the Petrović dynasty placed in the place, being the first building, soon followed by other buildings gradually forming urban settlement.

During the 1862 uprising in Herzegovina, Montenegro faced Ottoman invasion which saw Montenegrin forces crushed. Peace treaty was signed in Rijeka Crnojevića on September 8th in 1862.

At the turn of the century, it was a major river port.

In World War two, the entire region was a hotspot of the partizan movement, one of the strongest communist hotspots in Yugoslavia.

== Geography ==
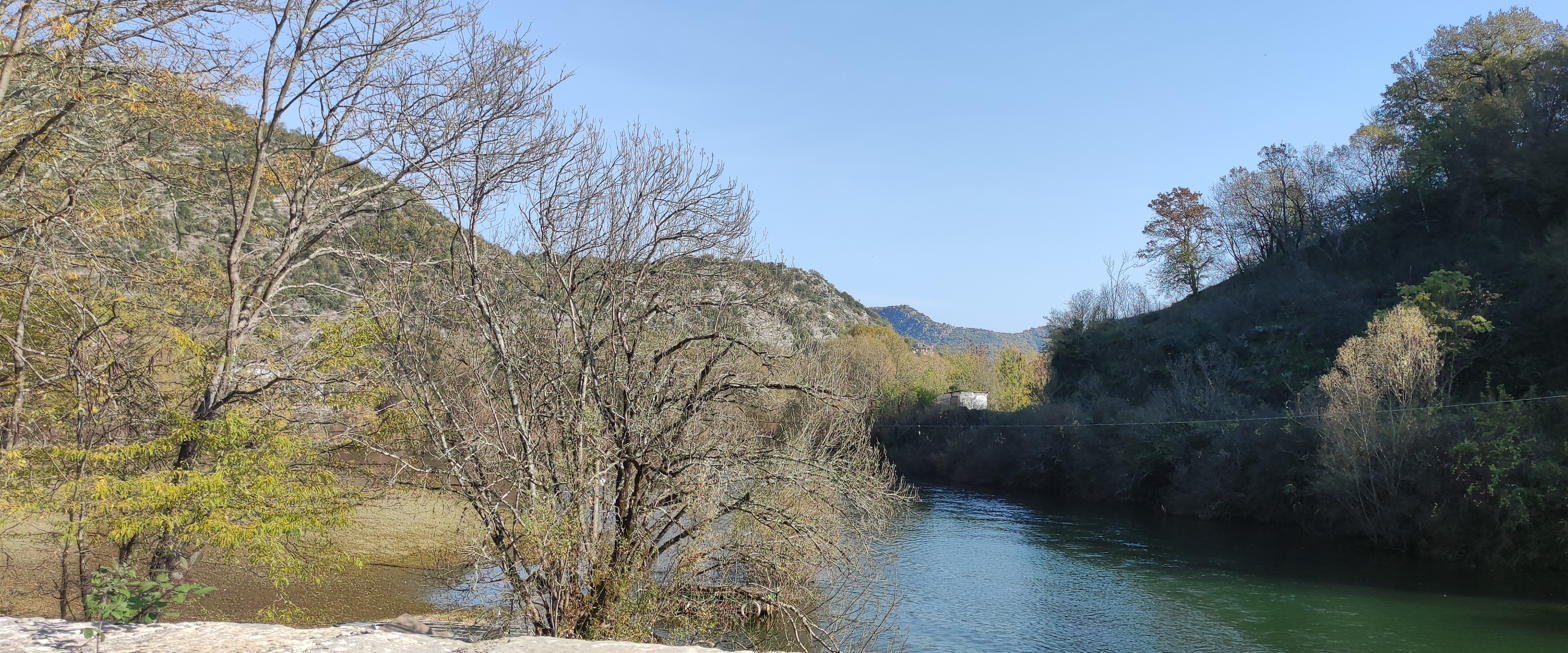
Skadar lake on winter days covers the river

Rijeka Crnojevića lays on the main water source in the region. It is placed in region with rare water sources, it had evolved into place of importance for all nearby residents. Proximity to Skadar lake makes the town vulnerable to water level of the lake, occasionally flooding exposed town buildings.

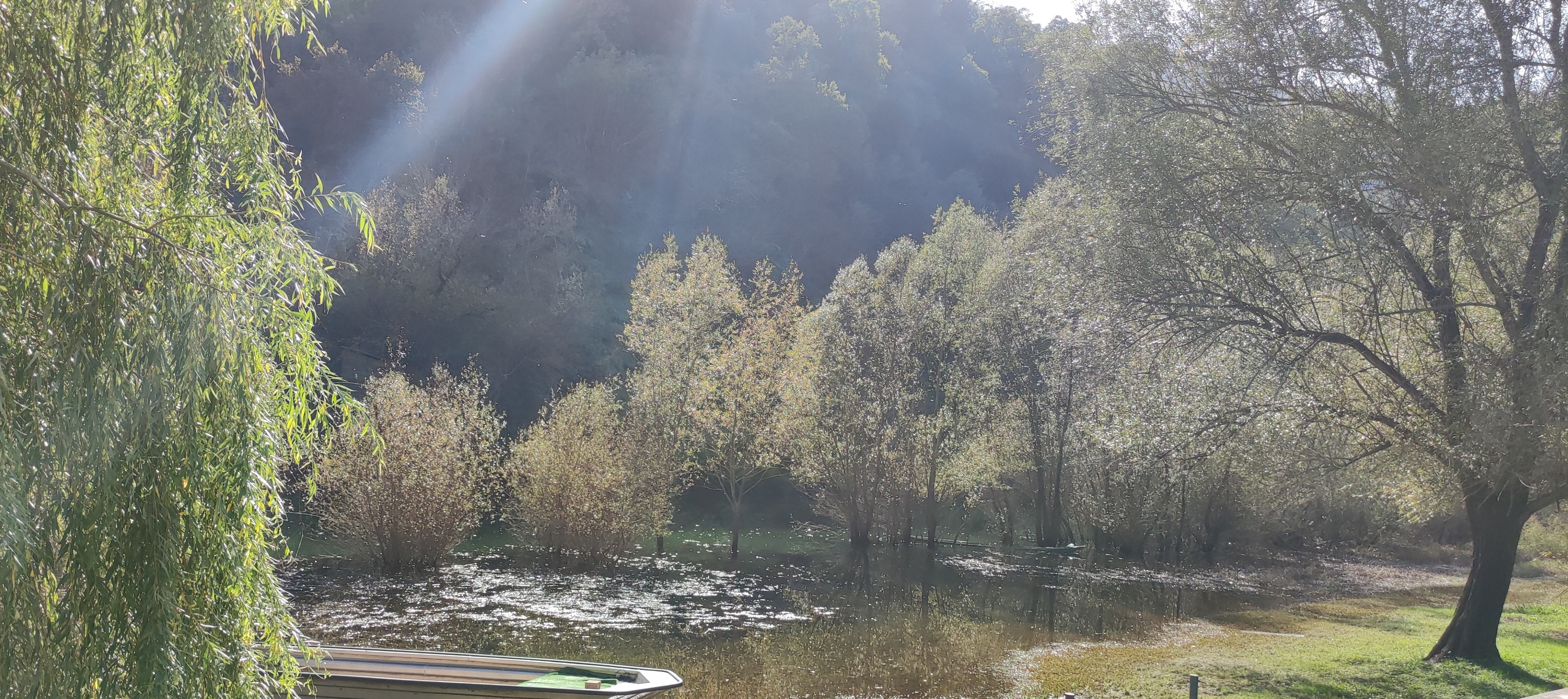
River flow in town

Steep hills raise above the town leaving barely any flat lands. Until 1982, major road from Titograd and Cetinje went through town due to being placed right in between them two. Nearby waters remain popular fishing hotspots.

Pavlova Strana is notoriously attractive for panoramic view of the river and the lake.

== Economy ==
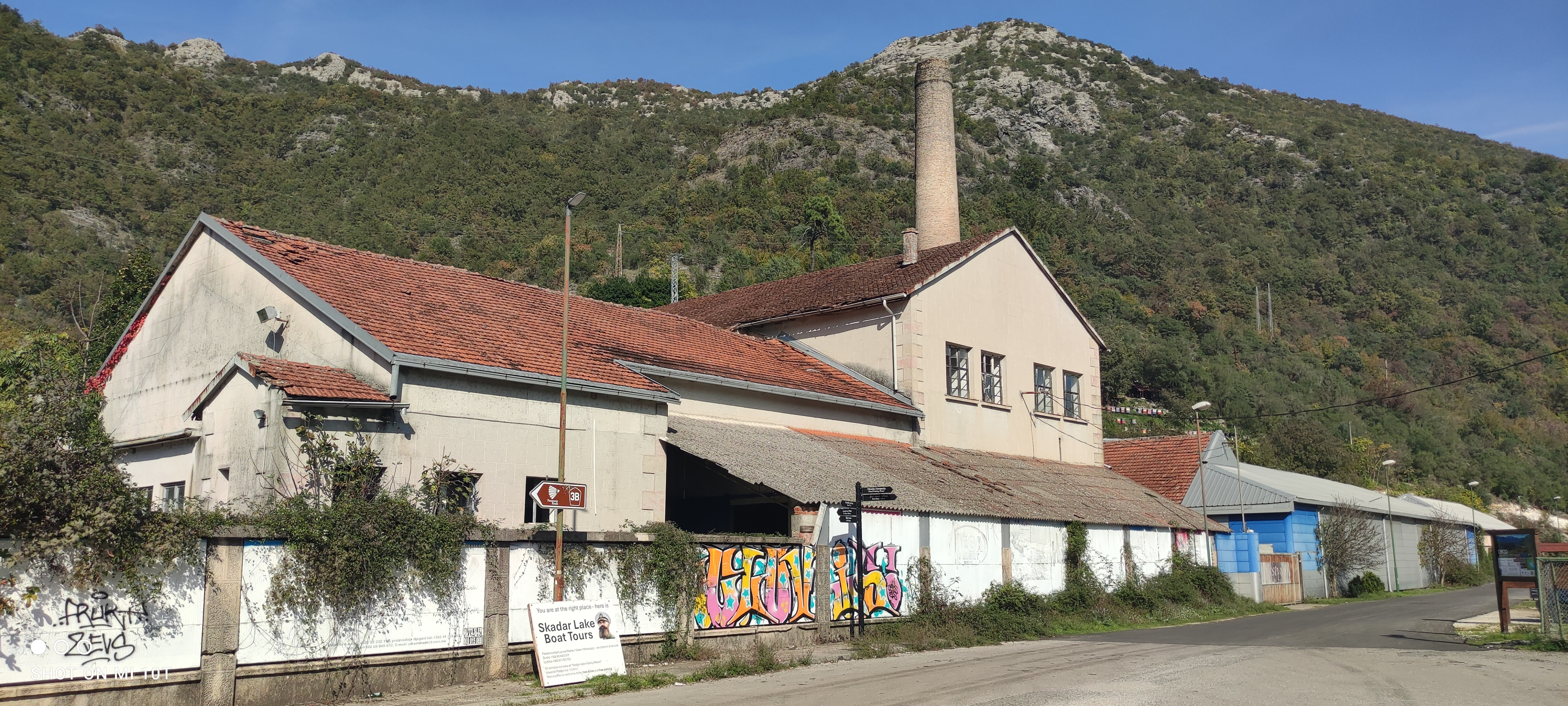
Fish factory

Town remained the main center of economic activities. Nearby people for centuries came to trade good and for other economic activities. The first manufacturing in the area came with establishing of sawmill in 1873. For a century, local hydro power plant still remains active, being one of the oldest in Montenegro, covering needs of consumers in the region.

Town attracted nearby residents who would temporary reside for fishing.

In SFRY, town saw the establishment of fish factory for the freshwater fish from the Skadar lake.

== Townscape ==
Town boasts a collection of buildings built in different periods, with variations of styles, varying from Dinaric vernacular to Mediterranean architecture. As a local historical, geographic and administrative center of the region, it developed sole urban settlement in the region with the most rich architecture.

Building of the bridge was commissioned in 1853 by the Montenegrin Prince Danilo, who erected the bridge in memory of his father Stanko Petrović. On the left bank of the river, adjacent to the bridge, Danilo also built a one-story house, popularly called Mostina. Danilo's bridge replaced the previous wooden bridge across the river, which was built by his predecessor Petar II Petrović-Njegoš.

Rijeka Crnojevića building

Petrović palace

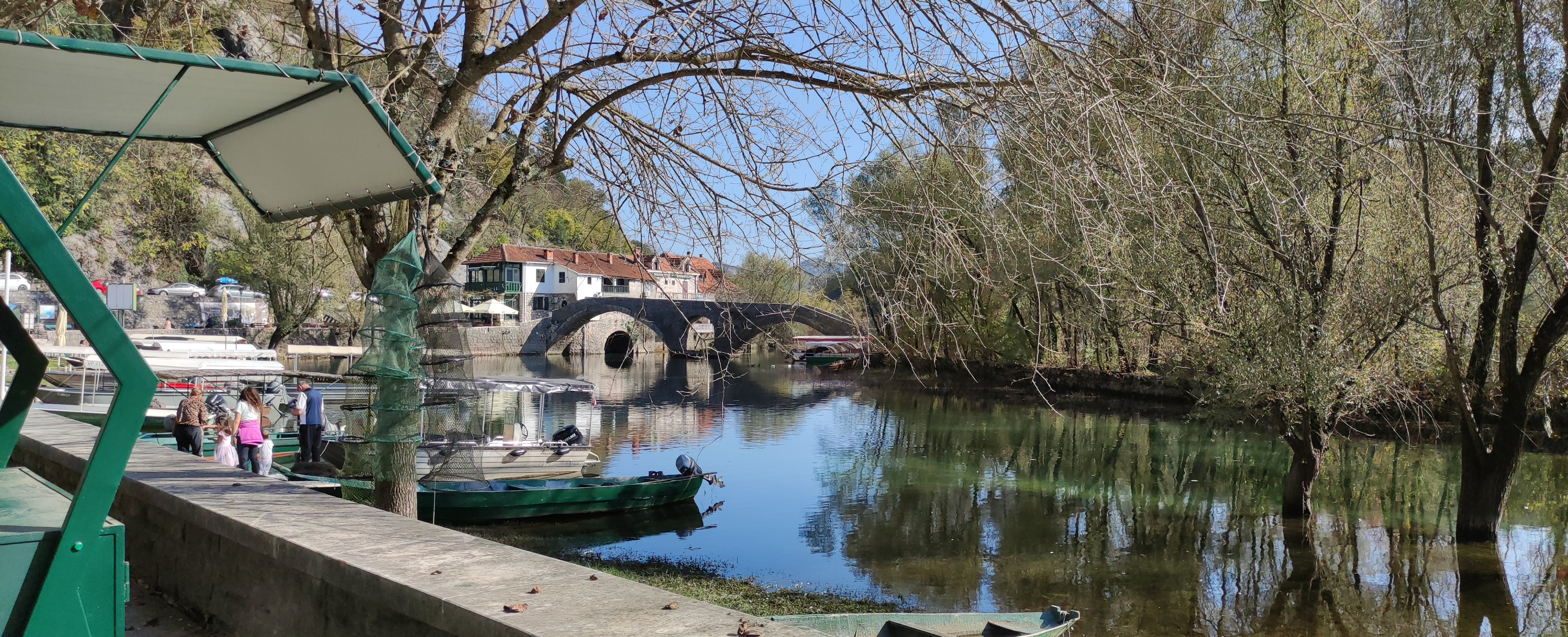
Old Bridge

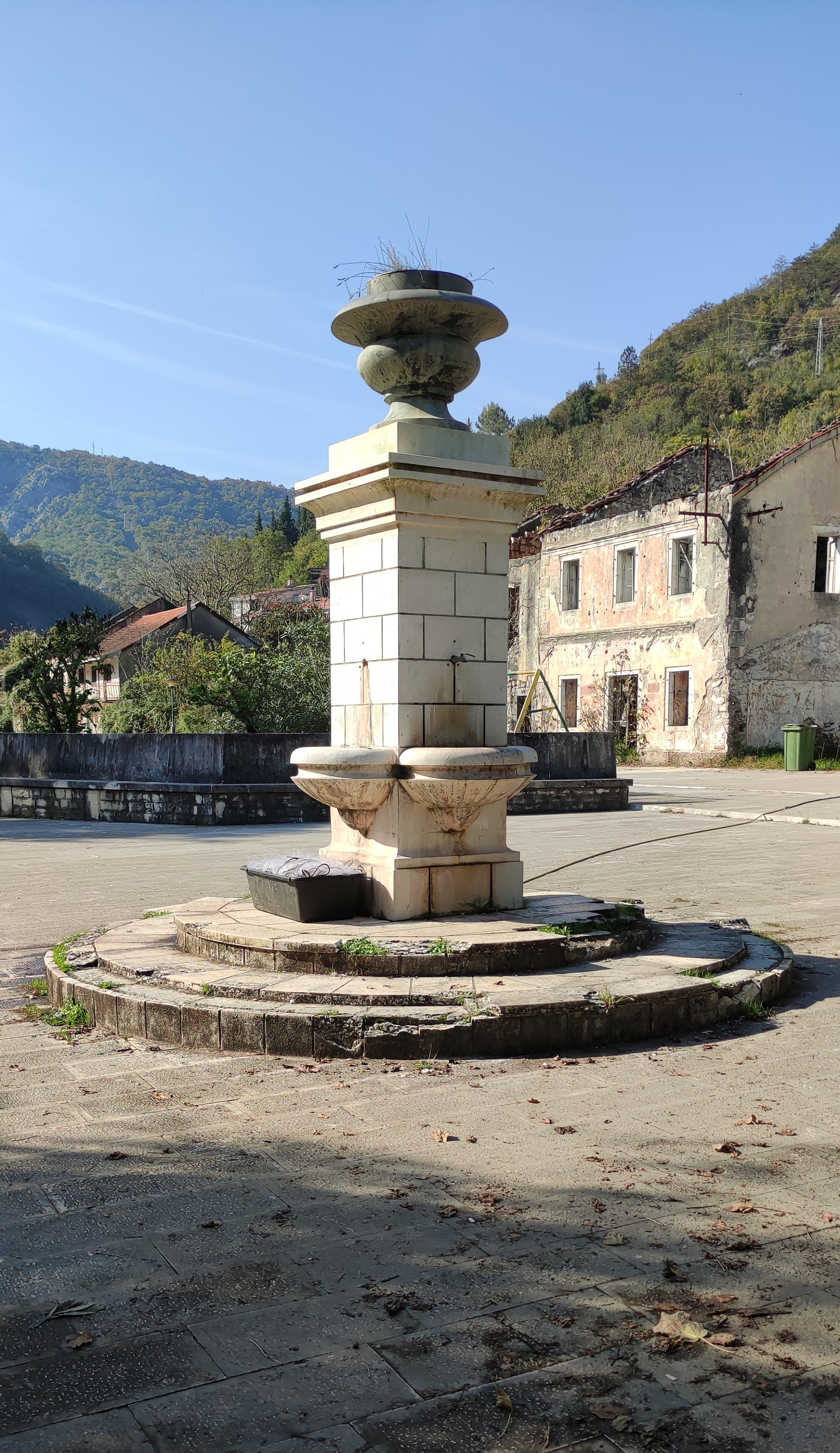
Water Fountain

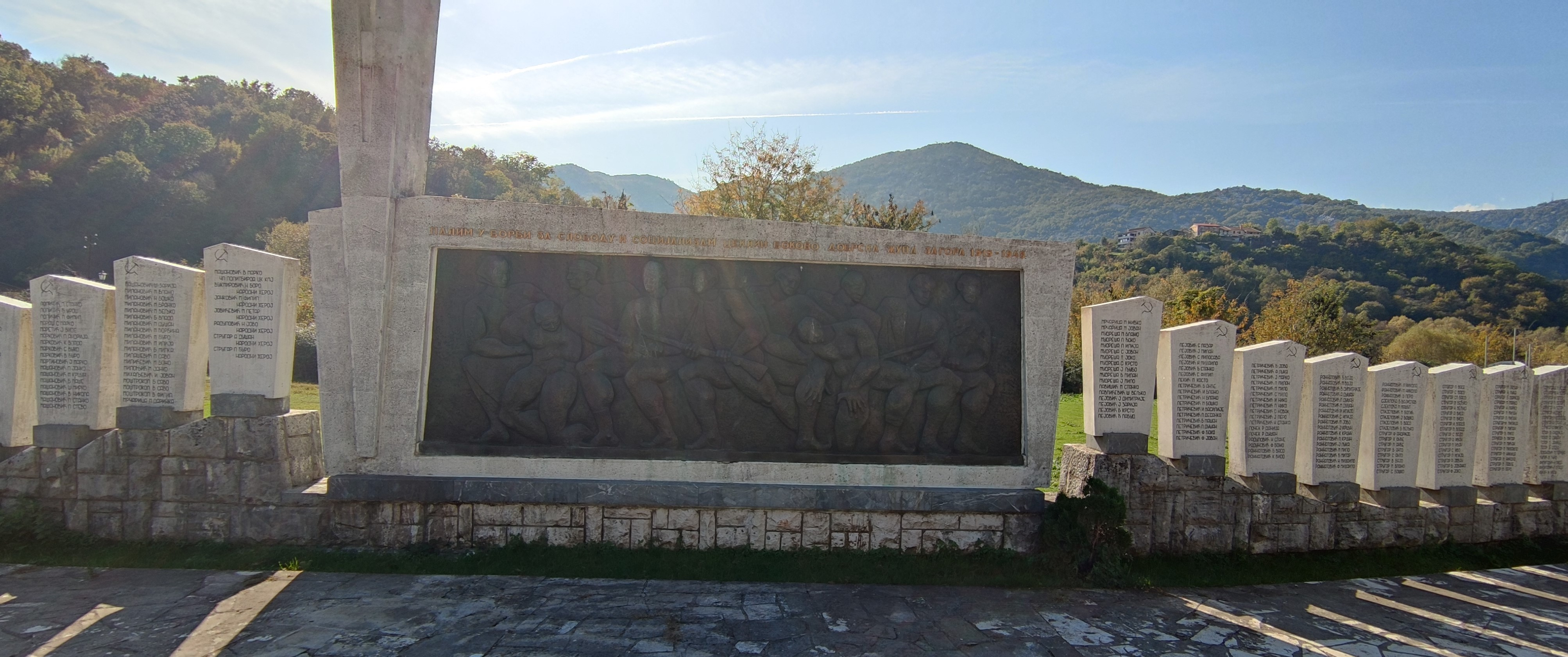
War monument

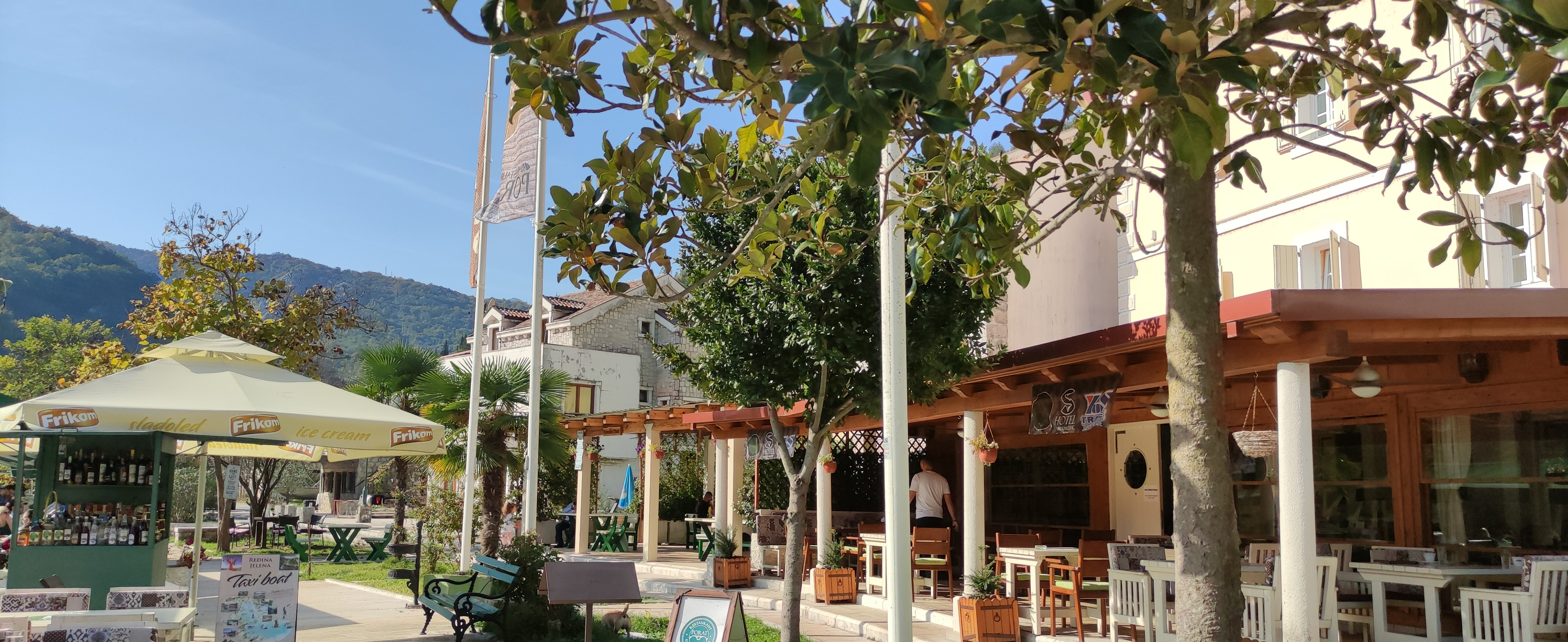
Riva

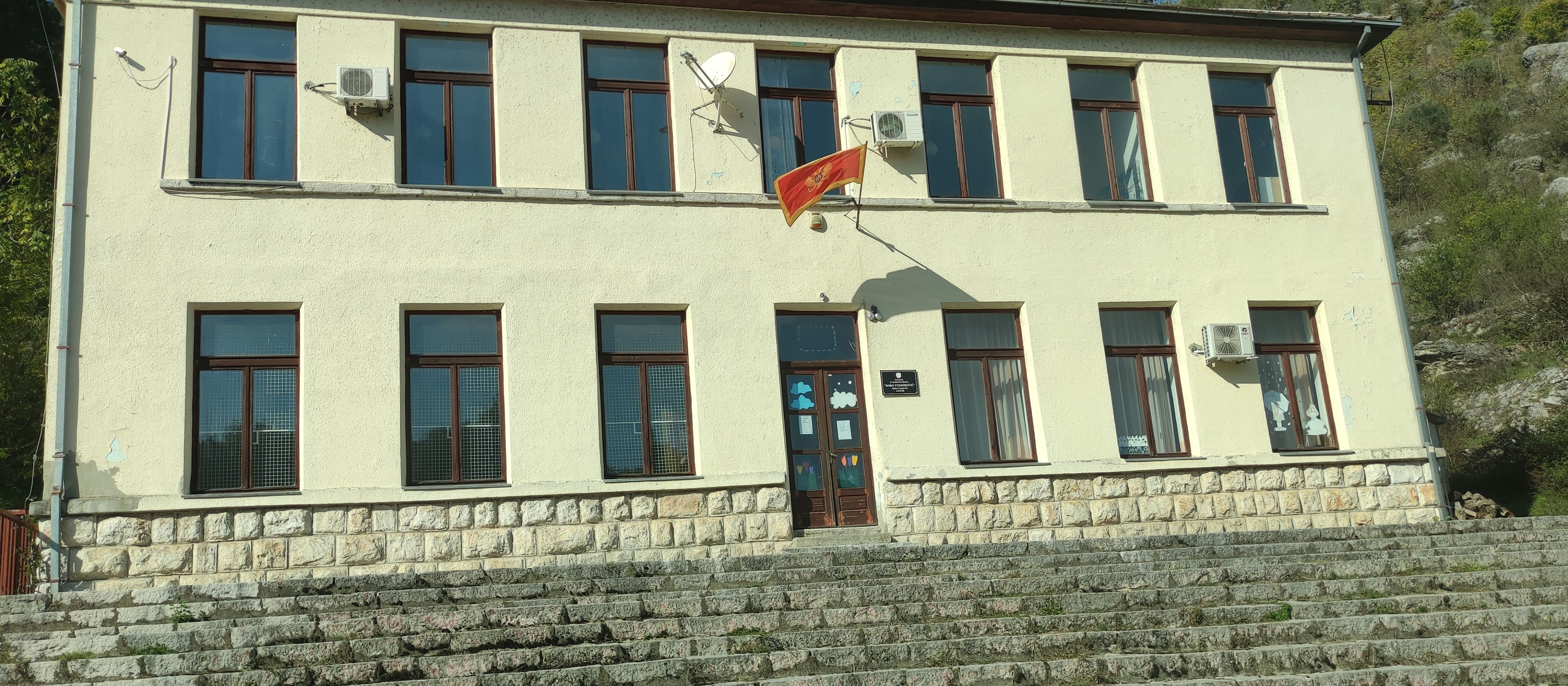
Elementary school

With the demographic decline, many buildings lay abandoned, most notably Petrović palace which, after many decades, saw entire roof collapsing.

== Demographics ==
Town saw steady decline for decades, peaking with almost one thousand residents with nearby areasin 60s. Residents are predominantly Montenegrin with sizeable community of Serbs.

Ethnicity in 2011
Ethnicity	Number	Percentage
Montenegrins	119	68%
Serbs	35	20%
Montenegrins-Serbs	6	3.4%
other and undeclared	15	8.6%
Total	175	100%

Ethnicity in 2023
Ethnicity	Number	Percentage
Montenegrins	53	63.09%
Serbs	27	32.14%
other and undeclared	3	3.57%
Total	84	100%

== See also ==
- Crnojević printing house
- Rijeka Crnojevića (river)
- Rijeka Crnojevića Bridge
