= Rijeka Crnojevića (river) =

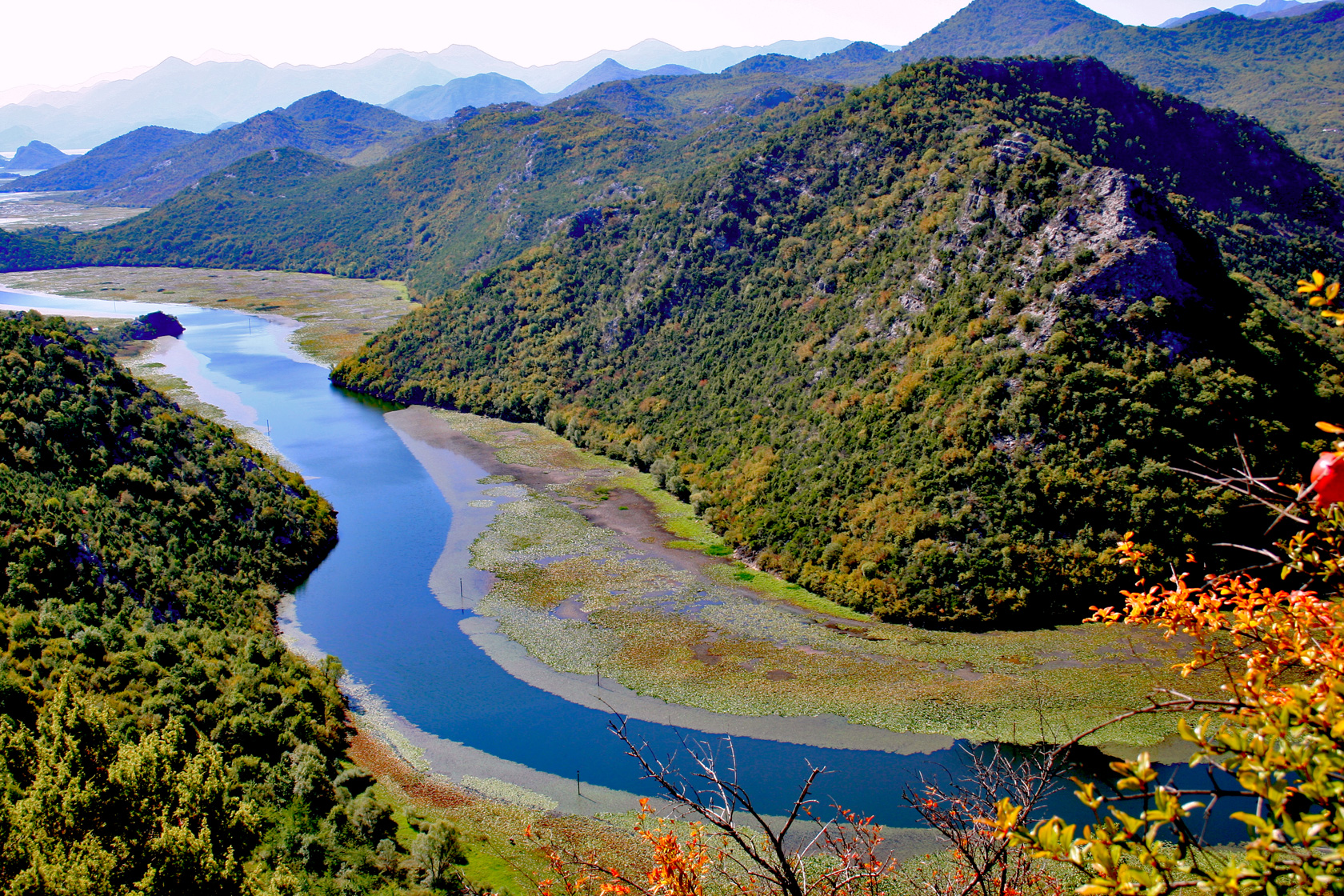

Location
- Country: Montenegro

Physical characteristics
- Source
  - coordinates: 42.3520902°N 19.007678°E
- Mouth
  - location: Lake Skadar
  - coordinates: 42.3085°N 19.0882°E
- Length: 12.3 km (7.6 mi)

Basin features
- Progression: Lake Skadar→ Bojana→ Adriatic Sea

The Rijeka Crnojevića (Montenegrin Cyrillic: Ријека Црнојевића, lit. 'River of Crnojević') is a river in Montenegro, emerging just above and running through the eponymous town, close to the northeastern shores of Lake Skadar.

Its length is 12.3 km. The spring of Rijeka Crnojevića is located 2.5 km south-west from Rijeka Crnojevića town, under the cave in Obod hill, which is 420m high.

== See also ==
- Crnojević printing house
- Rijeka Crnojevića town
- Rijeka Crnojevića Bridge
