= Rijeka Crnojevića Bridge =

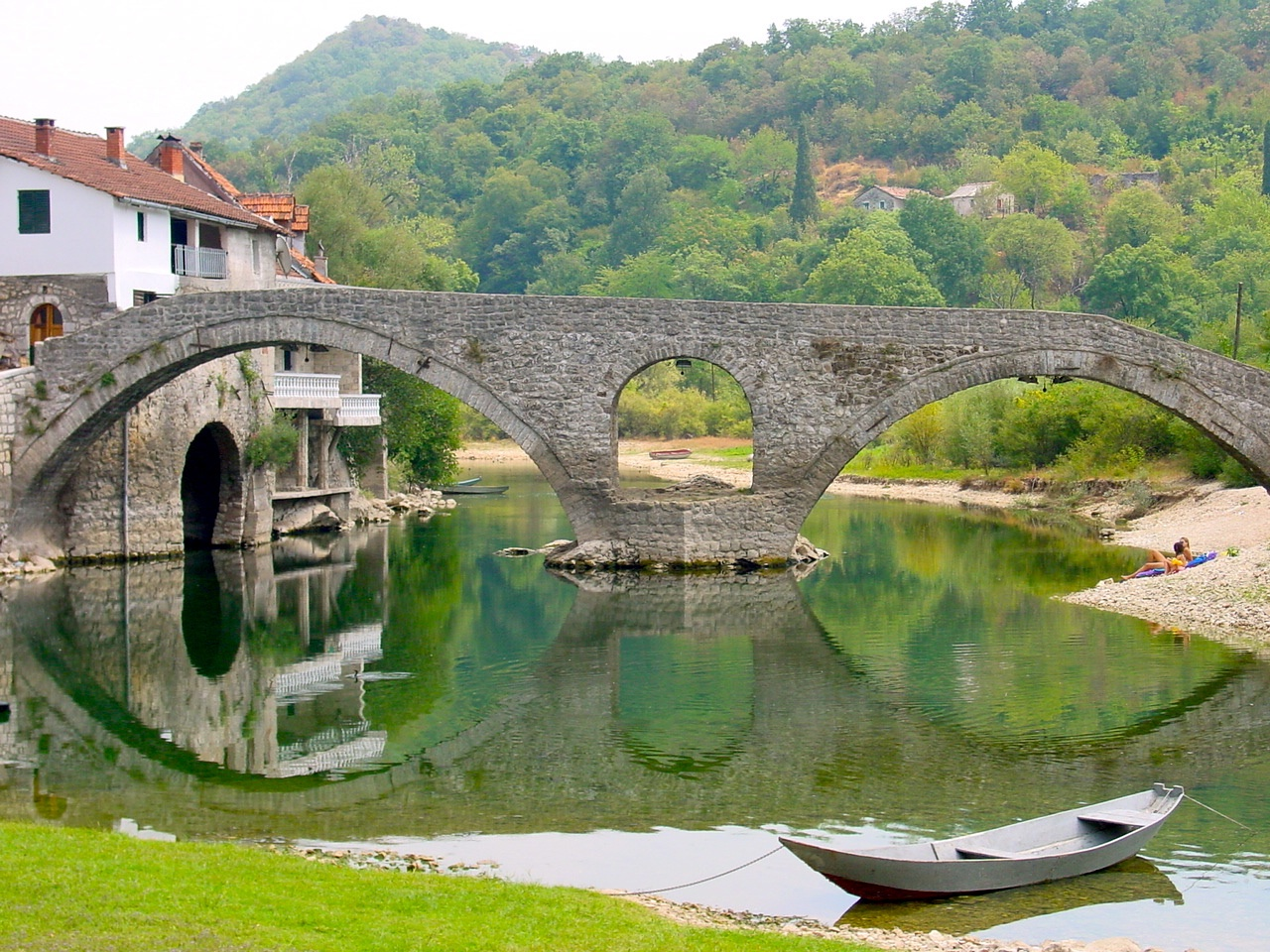
- Coordinates: 42°21′21″N 19°01′28″E
- Crosses: Rijeka Crnojevića River
- Locale: Rijeka Crnojevića, Montenegro
- Official name: Most na Rijeci Crnojevića

Characteristics
- Total length: 43 m

History
- Opened: 1853

Location
- Interactive map of Rijeka Crnojevića Bridge

Rijeka Crnojevića Bridge (Montenegrin: Most na Rijeci Crnojevića / Мост на Ријеци Црнојевића), also known as Danilo's Bridge (Montenegrin: Danilov most / Данилов мост), is a bridge in Rijeka Crnojevića, Montenegro. The bridge spans the Rijeka Crnojevića River and is one of the most important historical monuments and tourist attractions in Cetinje Municipality. The bridge connected Rijeka Crnojevića with the medieval town of Obod, located on a hilltop across the river, which was the location of the first South Slavic printing house.

== History ==
Building of the bridge was commissioned in 1853 by the Montenegrin Prince Danilo, who erected the bridge in memory of his father Stanko Petrović. On the left bank of the river, adjacent to the bridge, Danilo also built a one-story house, popularly called Mostina (Montenegrin Cyrillic: Мостина). Danilo's Bridge replaced the previous wooden bridge across the river, which was built by his predecessor Petar II Petrović-Njegoš.

== Characteristics ==
Danilo's Bridge is a double-arched limestone bridge. Its total length is 43 meters.
