= Črni Kal =

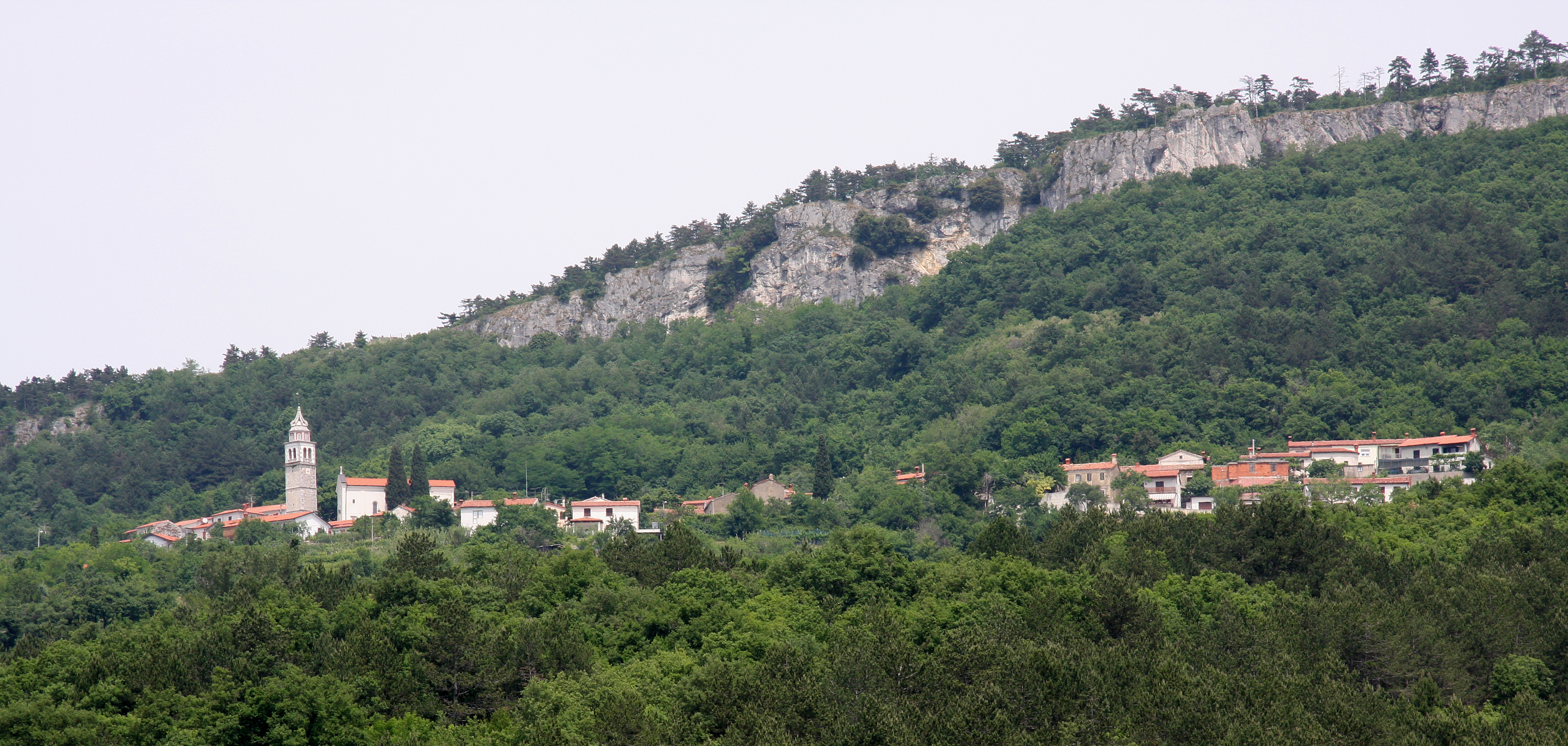

- Location in Slovenia
- Coordinates: 45°33′0.01″N 13°52′42.38″E
- Country: Slovenia
- Traditional region: Littoral
- Statistical region: Coastal–Karst
- Municipality: Koper

Area
  - Total: 1.47 km^{2} (0.57 sq mi)
- Elevation: 252.9 m (830 ft)

Population (2002)
  - Total: 191

Črni Kal (pronounced [ˈtʃəɾni ˈkaːu̯]; Italian: San Sergio) is a village in southwestern Slovenia in the City Municipality of Koper. It is best known today for the Črni Kal Viaduct, the longest and highest viaduct in Slovenia.

== Name ==
Črni Kal was attested in historical sources as Fontanafusca in 1035, Zernical in 1402, Cernical in 1404, and Zernicali in 1404. The name Črni Kal, literally 'black pond', is based on the common noun kal 'pond, watering hole' and originates in a local geographical feature. The Italianized name of the settlement, San Sergio, was applied during the Fascist era. It refers to the San Sergio Fortress (Slovene: Utrdba San Sergio), which was built above the settlement in the 11th century to control traffic from the Rižana Valley to the Karst Plateau.

== Architecture ==
=== Houses ===
The village has several examples of traditional Karst architecture. One such monument is the Benko House, built in 1489 by stonemasons Andrej (Andrew) and Benko (Benjamin), as indicated by an inscription on the building: Andreas et Benco construxerunt. This makes it oldest surviving farmhouse in the Koper area and is also the oldest signed and dated secular building in all of Slovenia. It stands on the lower edge of the village core and is made of chiseled limestone and marlstone blocks. It comprises two buildings with inscriptions in the Glagolitic alphabet on the facade. The older building is the main house, with Romanesque as well as late-Gothic features.

=== Church ===
The local church is dedicated to Saint Lawrence and belongs to the Parish of Predloka. The church's bell tower leans to the west, deviating from the vertical by over one meter.
