= Stari Bar =

Stari Bar Стари Бар Tivari i Vjetër Old Bar
- Town
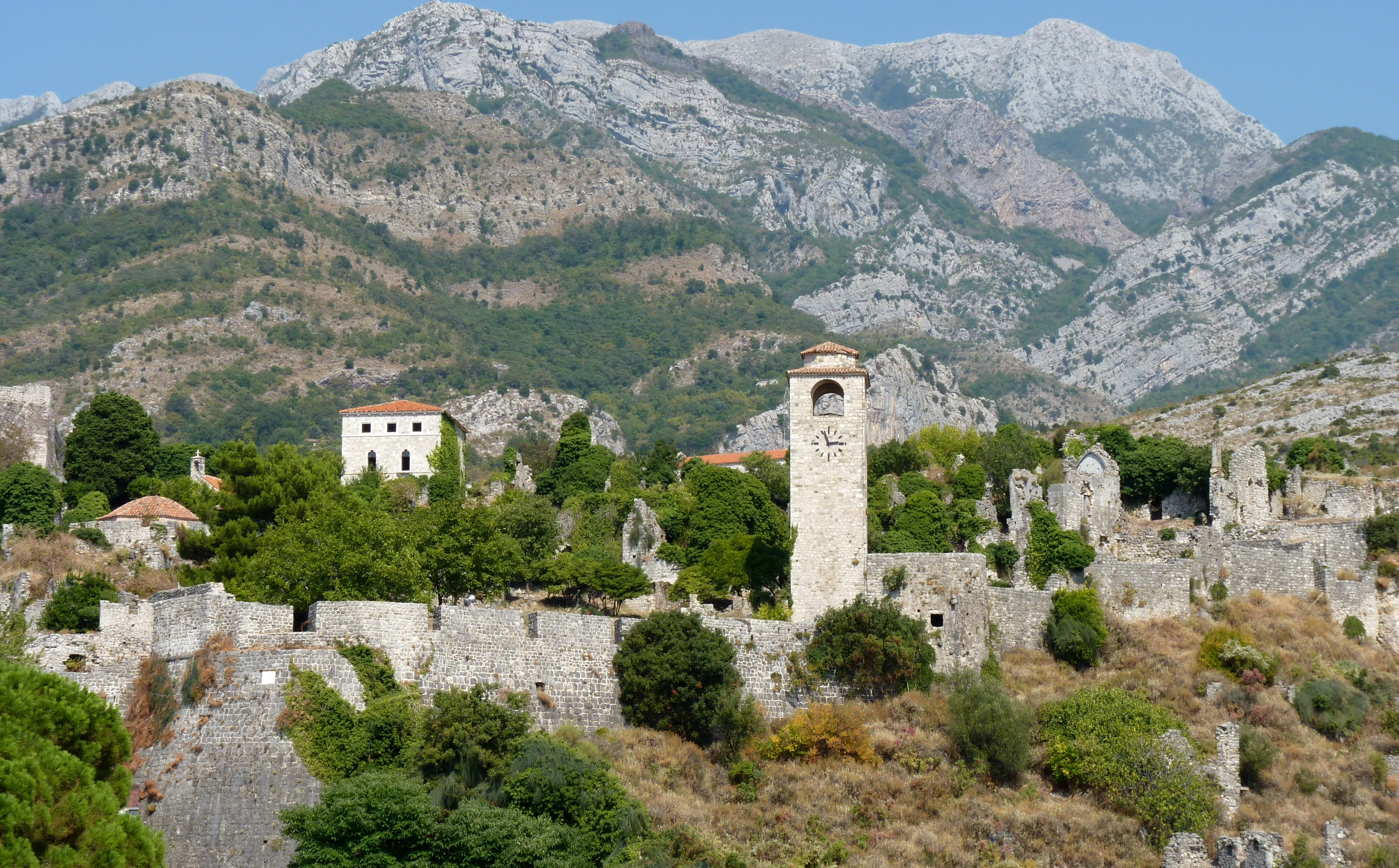
- Fortress Bar

- Location within Montenegro
- Coordinates: 42°05′14″N 19°07′35″E
- Country: Montenegro
- Municipality: Bar
- Elevation: 184 m (604 ft)

Population (2003)
  - Total: 1,864
- Time zone: UTC+1 (CET)
  - Summer (DST): UTC+2 (CEST)
- Postal code: 85354
- Area code: +382 30
- Vehicle registration: BR

Stari Bar (Cyrillic: Стари Бар, Albanian: Tivar i Vjetër; lit. "Old Bar") is a small town in Montenegro. It is located inland, three kilometers from the new city of Bar. According to the 2003 census, the town has a population of 1,864 people.

== Geography ==
Stari Bar is located on a hilltop (Londša hill) overlooking the Adriatic Sea, at the foot of Mount Rumija. It is surrounded by agricultural land. Bar is south of the Bay of Kotor between the fortresses at Budva (Buva) to the northwest and Ulcinj to the southeast.

== History ==
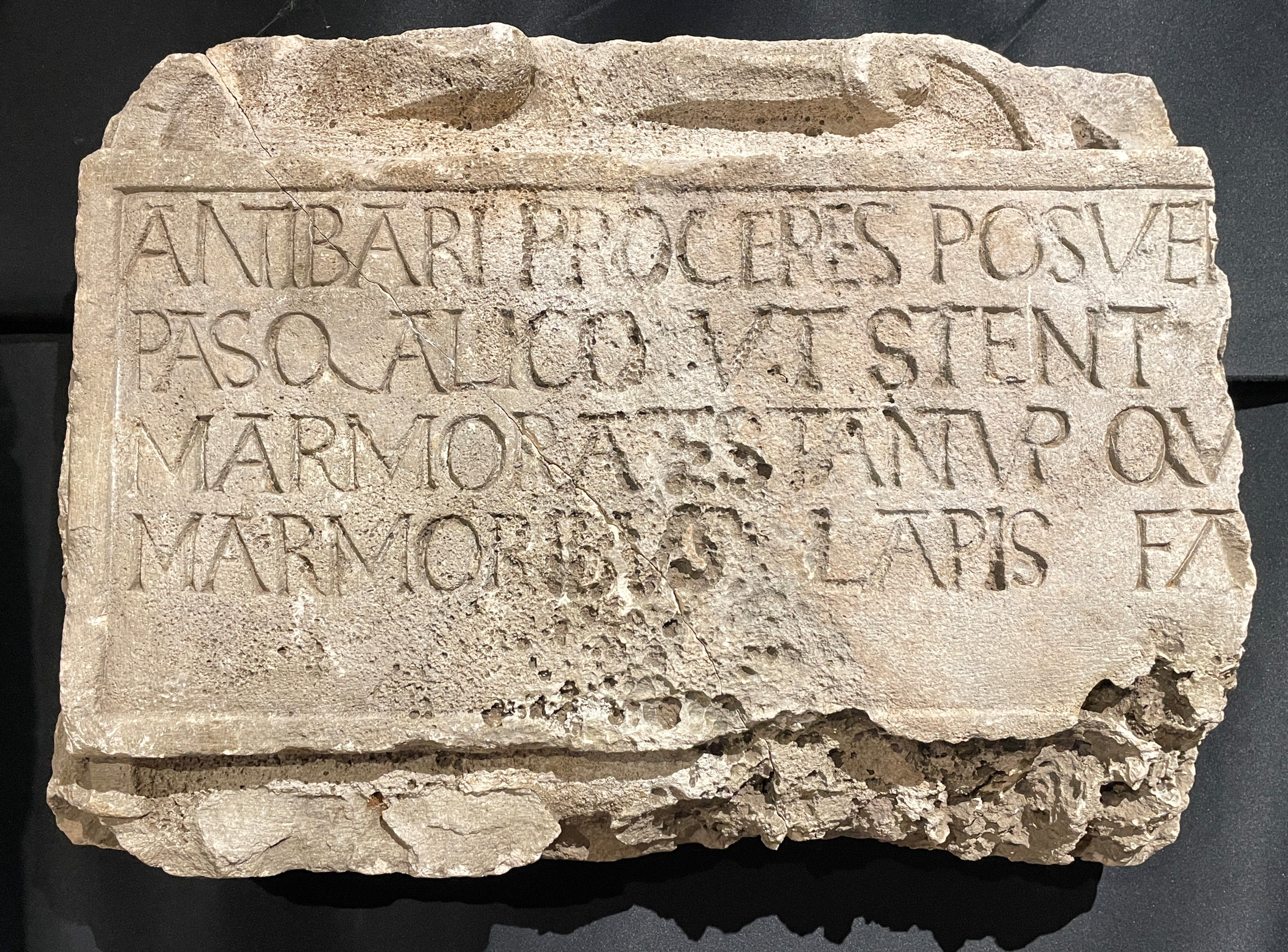
Inscription from 16th century mentioning name ANTIBARI

In the Early Middle Ages, Antivari (Latin: Antibarium) remained a subject of the Byzantine Empire, as part of the Theme of Dyrrhacium. Stefan Vojislav, incorporated it into his state in c. 1040, and his family till 1090, after which it became part of the medieval Serbian state culminating in the Empire under the Nemanjić dynasty. It was briefly annexed by the Republic of Venice, until Louis I of Hungary forced the Republic of Venice to renounce the Dalmatian towns in 1358 (Treaty of Zadar). About 1360, the Balšić family of Zeta gained control of Bar as the Serbian Empire crumbled. Venice took Bar from the Bašićs in 1405, but lost it back to the Bašićs in 1412 as they had received aid from Mehmed I. However in 1421 the Venetians took advantage of Balša III's death to reclaim Bar, however, the Serbian Despotate ended up in control of Bar from 1421 to 1441. In 1441 and again in 1442 to 1443, Bar was in the hands of the Grand Duke of Bosnia, Stefan Vukčić Kosača. In 1443, it was again annexed by Venice who held it until it was taken by the Ottoman Empire in 1571 as part of the Ottoman expansion into Europe.

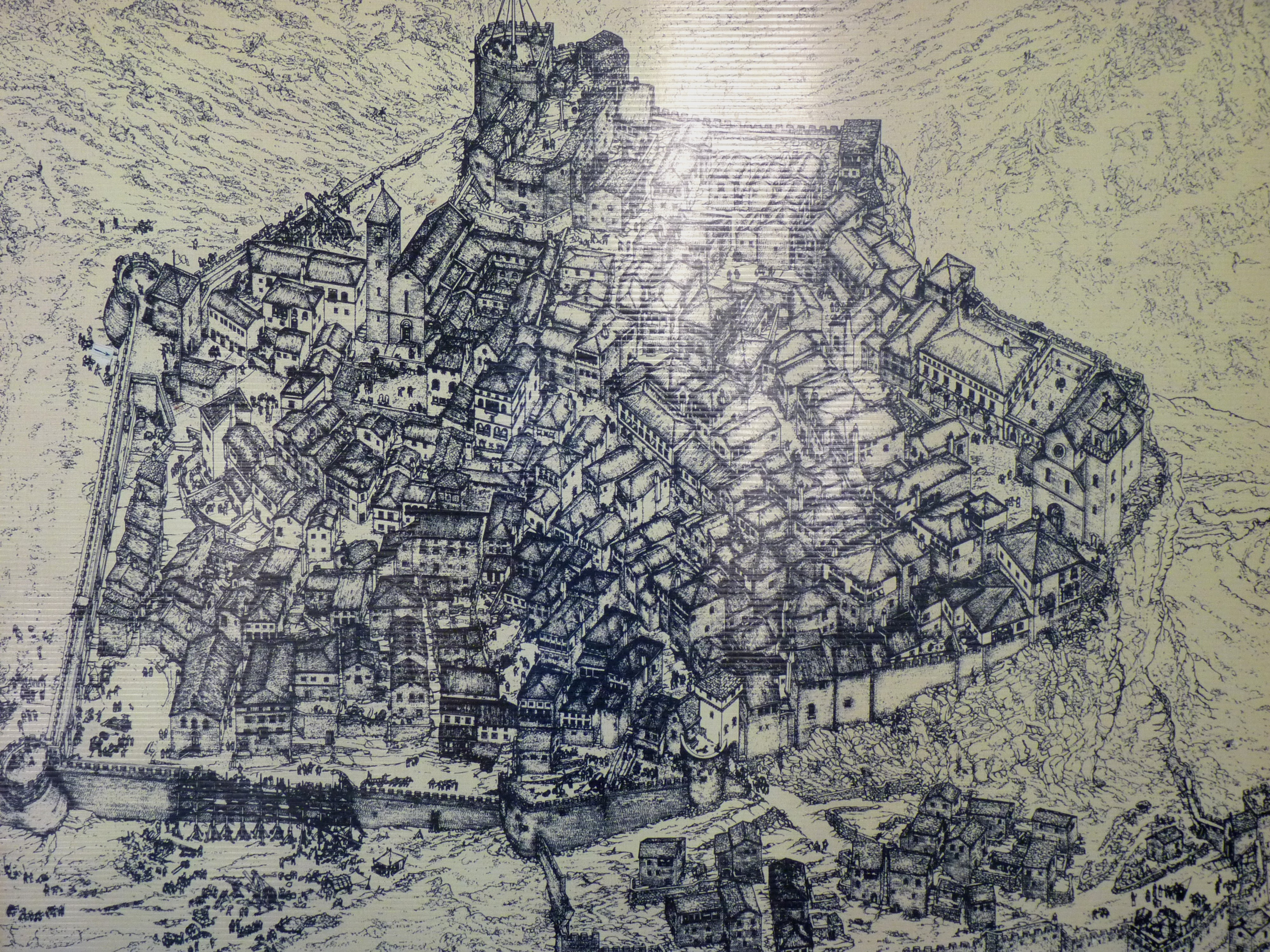
Map of Stari Bar

On 13 November 1877, during the Montenegrin–Ottoman War (1876–78), the town was besieged by forces under the command of Mašo Vrbica. The defenses of the town were in the hands of Ibrahim Bey, who refused to surrender the town despite the Montenegrin heavy artillery bombardment, consisting of four Russian guns, and six Ottoman guns that had been seized at the Battle of Nikšić. The bombardment lasted over seven weeks and much of the town was destroyed. On 5 January 1878, the Montenegrins detonated a 225 kg explosive inside the Bar Aqueduct which cut off the town's water supply. Ibrahim Bey surrendered the town on 9 January. The Bar peninsula and the town were awarded to the newly recognized Principality of Montenegro at the Congress of Berlin (1878).

After the 1979 Montenegro earthquake destroyed the aqueduct that supplied water to the town, the location was abandoned, and the new town of Bar constructed on the coast at the old port facilities. After the aqueduct was restored some years later, people began to return.

== Demographics ==
Historical population
Year	Pop.	±%
1948	1,417	—
1953	1,679	+18.5%
1961	1,803	+7.4%
1971	1,559	−13.5%
1981	1,514	−2.9%
1991	1,968	+30.0%
2003	1,864	−5.3%

Ethnicity in 2003

Ethnicity	Number	Percentage
Montenegrins	729	39.10%
ethnic Muslims	510	27.36%
Serbs	221	11.85%
Bosniaks	101	5.41%
Albanians	101	5.41%
Romani	14	0.75%
Egyptians	7	0.37%
Croats	6	0.32%
Slovenes	1	0.05%
Macedonians	1	0.05%
Yugoslavs	1	0.05%
Others	60	3.21%
Total	1,864	100%

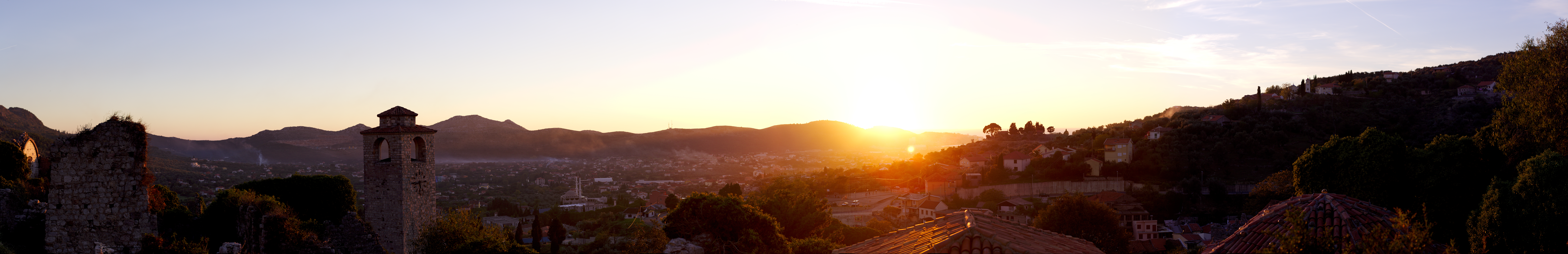
A panoramic view from the fortress of the Old Town of Bar.

== Sports ==
The local football club is FK Sloga Stari Bar who share the Stadion Topolica in Bar with FK Hajduk Bar and FK Mornar.
