= Blažo Jovanović Bridge =

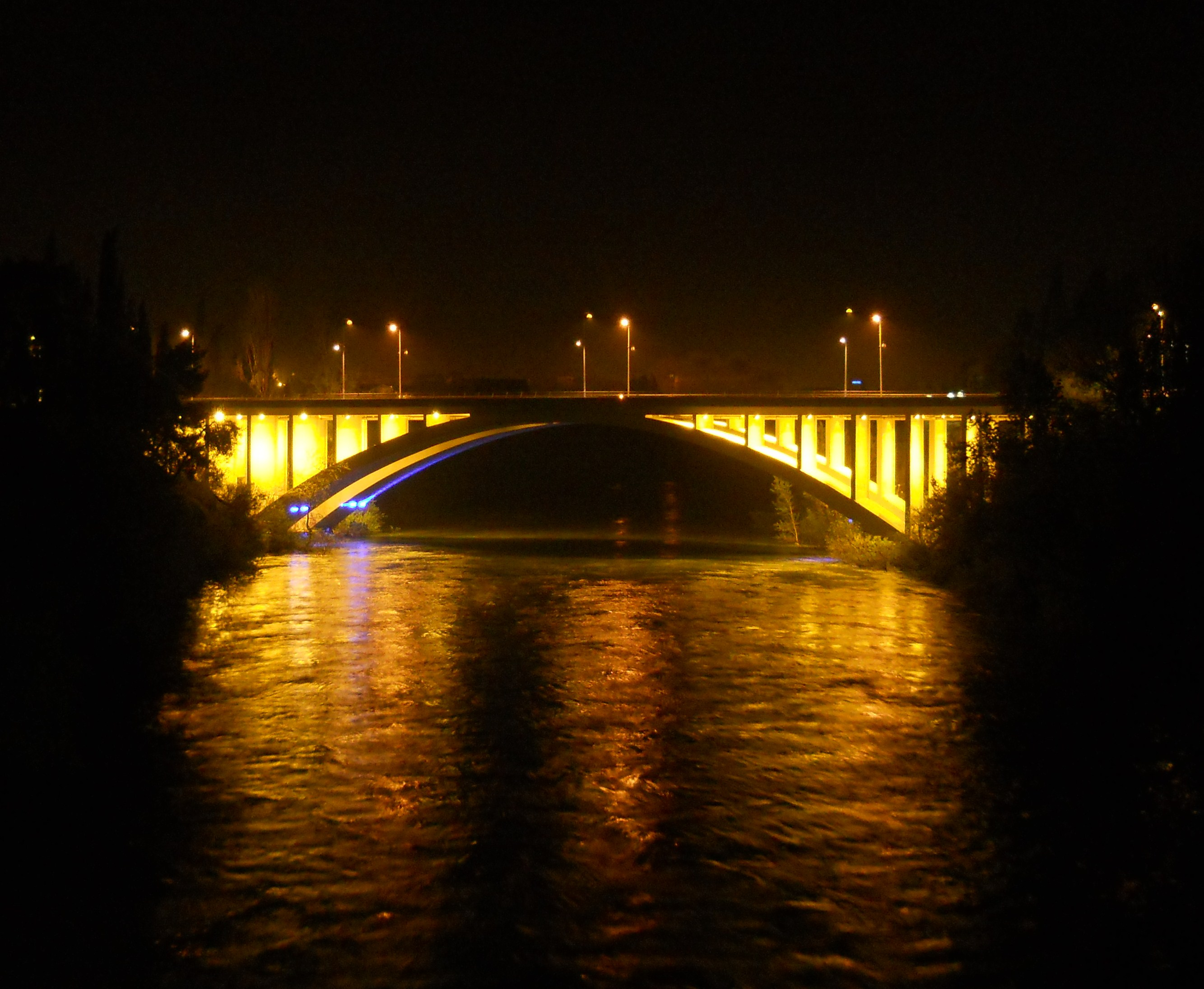
- Coordinates: 42°26′25″N 19°15′28″E
- Crosses: Morača River
- Locale: Podgorica, Montenegro
- Official name: Most Blaža Jovanovića

Characteristics
- Total length: 115,2 m
- Width: 22,35 m

History
- Opened: 1950

Location
- Interactive map of Blažo Jovanović Bridge

Blažo Jovanović Bridge (Montenegrin: Мост Блажа Јовановића, romanized: Most Blaža Jovanovića) is a bridge across the Morača river in Podgorica, Montenegro. The bridge is located near the confluence of the Ribnica and Morača rivers and is part of the Saint Peter of Cetinje Boulevard. It is 115.20m long, 22.35m wide and the city's busiest bridge.

== History ==
Blaža Jovanovića Bridge was constructed from 1948 to 1950. It was projected by the famous Serbian architect Branko Žeželj. The bridge was named after the Montenegrin national hero Blažo Jovanović. The bridge underwent a major reconstruction in 2008 and was officially re-opened in March 2009.
