= Millennium Bridge (Podgorica) =

Bridge over the River Morača in Montenegro

- Coordinates: 42°26′42″N 19°15′32″E
- Crosses: Morača River
- Locale: Podgorica, Montenegro
- Official name: Most Milenijum

Characteristics
- Design: cable-stayed
- Total length: 173 m (568 ft)
- Longest span: 140 m (459 ft)

History
- Opened: 13 July 2005

Location
- Interactive map of Millennium Bridge

The Millennium Bridge (Montenegrin: Мост Миленијум, romanized: Most Milenijum) is a cable-stayed bridge that spans the Morača river in Podgorica, Montenegro.

== History ==
The bridge was designed by Marjan Pipenbaher from the Slovenian company Ponting Bridges and Mladen Ulićević, a professor at the Faculty of Civil Engineering in Podgorica. It was built by the Slovenian company Primorje, and opened on 13 July 2005, Montenegro's National Day. It quickly became one of the city's most prominent landmarks.

The bridge is 173 metres long, and the pylon soars 57 m above the roadbed. Twelve cables support the roadway deck, while twenty-four more are attached to the counterweights, creating an imposing image.

The construction of the bridge began in 2005, and the building cost was approximately 7 million euros. The roadway carries two lanes of traffic and a pedestrian walkway in each direction. The bridge connects the Boulevard of Ivan Crnojević in the city centre and July 13 street in the new part of the city, thus relieving the other congested bridges connecting the city center with the densely populated districts over the Morača river.

Bridge guys

Night illumination

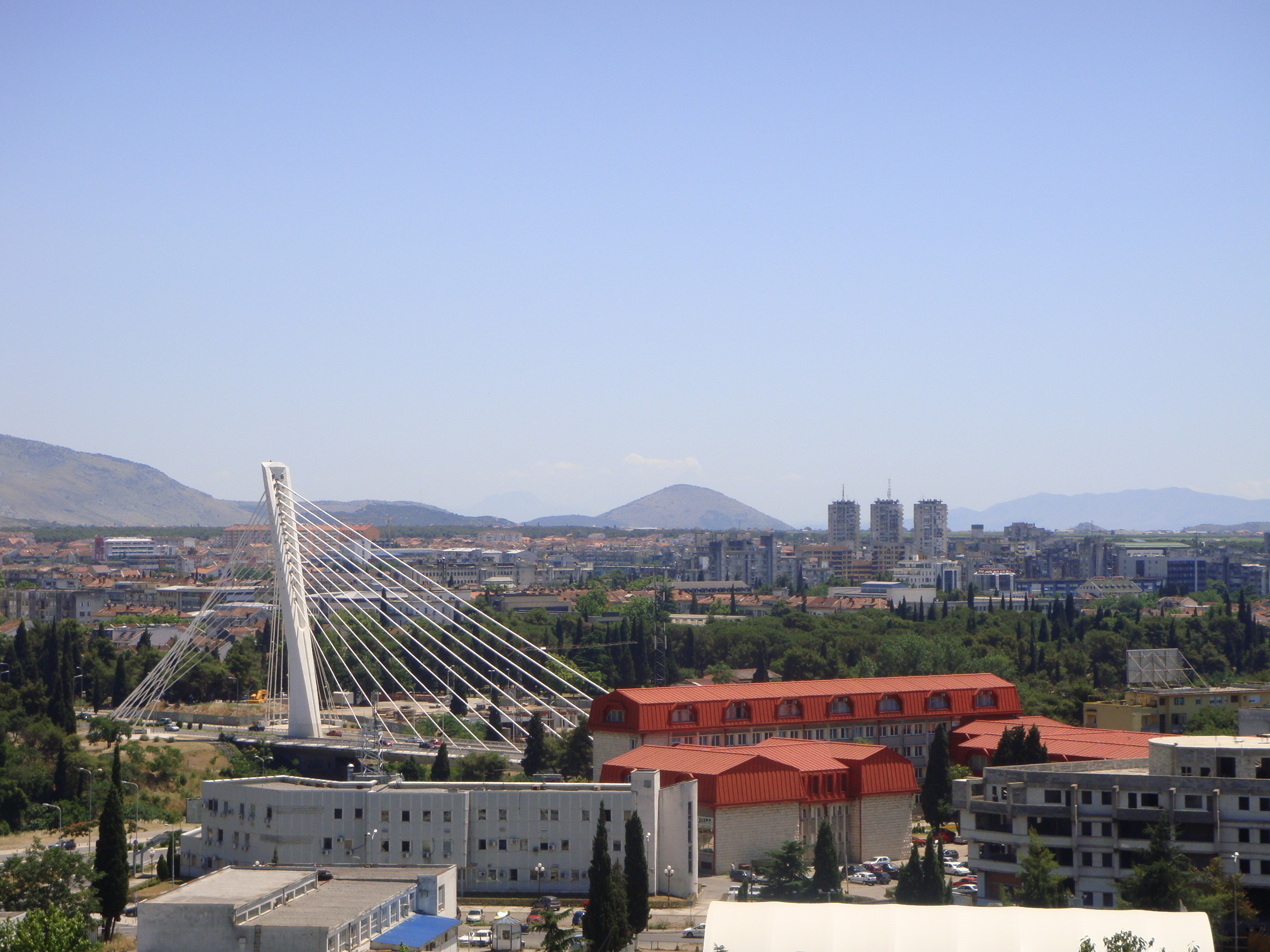
View of Millennium bridge and Podgorica
