= Ponting Bridges =

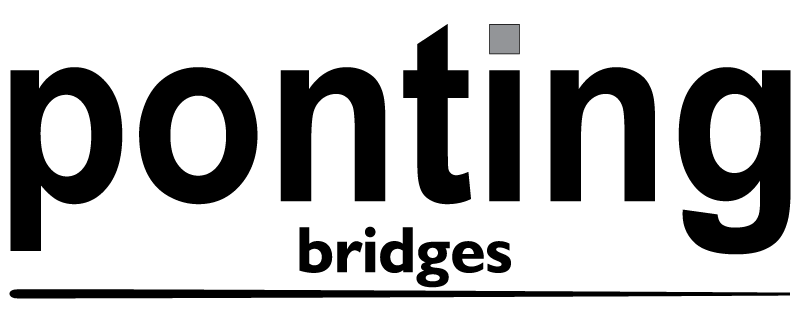
- Native name: Ponting inženirski biro d.o.o.
- Industry: civil engineering
- Founded: 1990; 36 years ago in Maribor, Slovenia
- Founder: Viktor Markelj, Marjan Pipenbaher
- Headquarters: Maribor, Slovenia
- Key people: dr. Viktor Markelj (partner, managing director, senior bridge designer), Marjan Pipenbaher (partner, managing director, senior bridge designer)
- Services: Design of varying types of bridge structures (bridges, viaducts, over- and underpasses, pedestrian and cyclist bridges), tunnels, galleries, buildings
- Website: www.ponting.si

Ponting Bridges is a Slovenian studio for structural engineering, focusing mainly on bridge structures, with headquarters in Maribor. The practice is led by a duo of its founders, Dr Viktor Markelj and Marjan Pipenbaher, and has constructed many high-profile bridges. These include Ada Bridge in Belgrade (2012), Pelješac Bridge (2022), drawbridge in Gdańsk (2017), Nissibi Euphrates Bridge in Turkey (2015), Puch Bridge in Ptuj (2007) and Črni Kal Viaduct in Slovenia (2004).

== History ==
The studio was established by Viktor Markelj and Marjan Pipenbaher as Ponting inženirski biro in 1990, after both left structural engineering company Gradis.

== Major projects ==
Major projects, by year of completion and ordered by type, are:

=== Bridges ===
- Carinthian bridge, Maribor, Slovenia (1996)
- Bridge over Mura River, highway Vučja vas–Beltinci, Slovenia (2003)
- Črni Kal Viaduct, Slovenia (2004)
- Viaduct Bivje, Slovenia (2004)
- Millennium Bridge, Podgorica, Montenegro (2006)
- Puch Bridge, Ptuj, Slovenia (2007)
- Viaduct Bonifika, Koper, Slovenia (2007)
- Viaduct Šumljak, highway Razdrto – Selo, Slovenia (2009)
- Viaduct Dobruša, Slovenia (2010)
- Viaduct Lešnica North / South, Slovenia (2007/2011)
- Ada Bridge, Belgrade, Serbia (2012)
- Peračica viaducts, Slovenia (2012)
- Giborim bridge, Haifa, Israel (2012)
- Nissibi Euphrates Bridge, highway Adıyaman–Diyarbakır, Turkey (2015)
- High speed railway bridge no. 10, HSR Tel Aviv–Jerusalem, Israel (2017)
- NAR Viaducts, Belgrade, Serbia (2018)
- Pelješac Bridge, Croatia (2022)

=== Over- and underpasses ===
- Arch overpass 4-3 in Kozina, Slovenia (1997)
- Underpass in Celje, Slovenia (2004)
- Overpass 4-6 in Slivnica, Slovenia (2008)
- Viaduct/overpass Grobelno, Slovenia (2015)

=== Pedestrian and cyclist bridges ===
- Footbridge in Ptuj, Slovenia (1997)
- Footbridge over Soča, Bovec, Slovenia (2007)
- Studenci footbridge, Maribor, Slovenia (2007)
- Marinič footbridge, Škocjan Caves Park, Slovenia (2010)
- Ribja brv, Ljubljana, Slovenia (2014)
- Pedestrian and cyclist drawbridge to Ołowianka Island, Gdańsk, Poland (2017)
- Langur Way Canopy Walk, Penang Hill, Malaysia (2018)
- Pedestrian and cycle bridge in Tremerje, Laško, Slovenia (2019)

=== Tunnels and galleries ===
- Tunnel Malečnik, Maribor, Slovenia (2009)
- Arcade gallery Meljski hrib, Maribor, Slovenia (2012)

=== Current ===
- Kömürhan Bridge, Turkey (under construction)
- Ada Huja Bridge, Belgrade, Serbia (preliminary design)
- Highway bridge and parallel pedestrian bridge over Krka river, Slovenia (construction completed, finishing works)
- Railway viaduct Pesnica, Slovenia (preliminary design)

=== Selected works ===
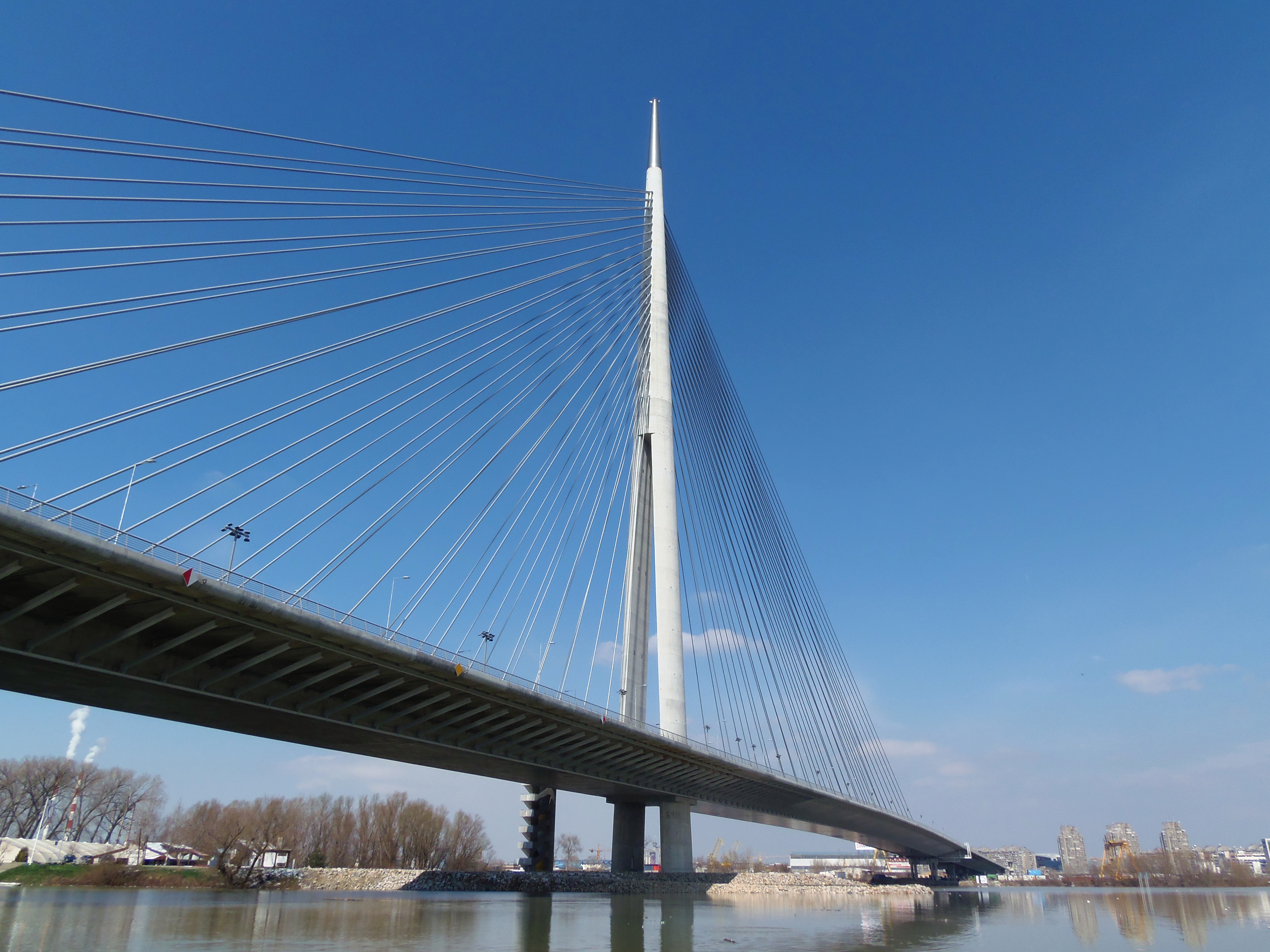
Ada Bridge, Belgrade, Serbia (2012)

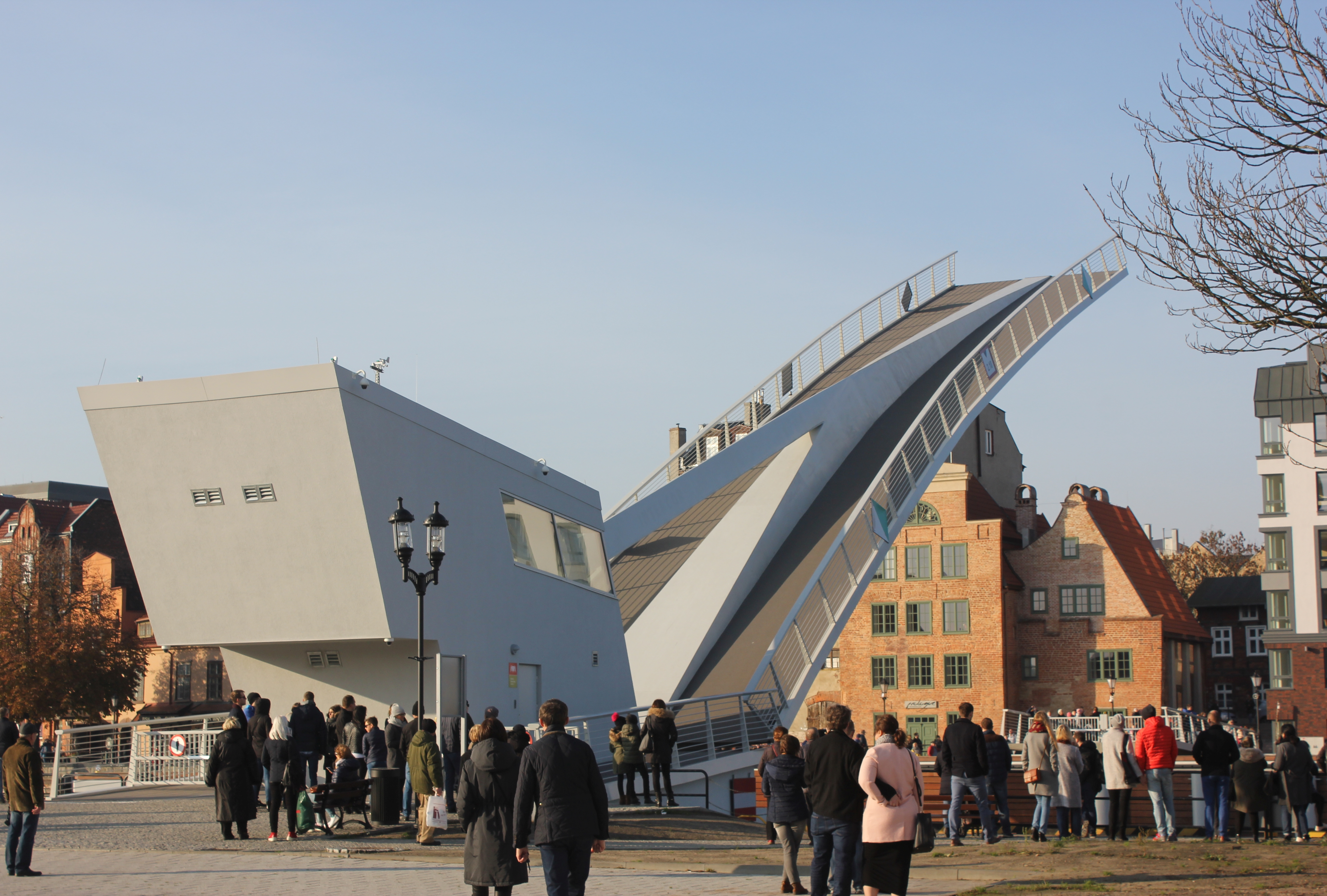
Pedestrian and cyclist drawbridge to Ołowianka Island, Gdańsk, Poland (2017)

Millennium Bridge, Podgorica, Montenegro (2006)

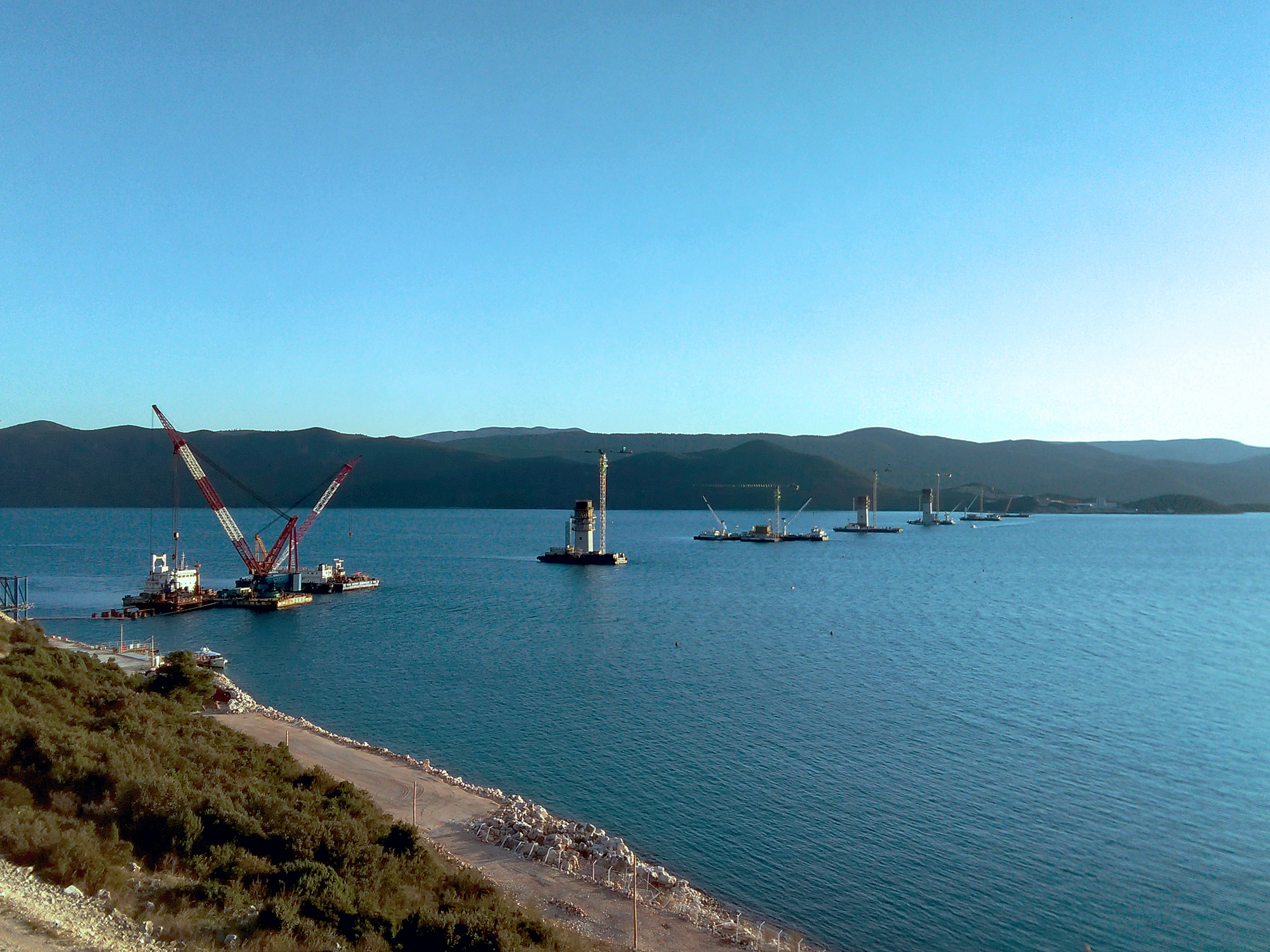
Pelješac Bridge, Croatia (2022)

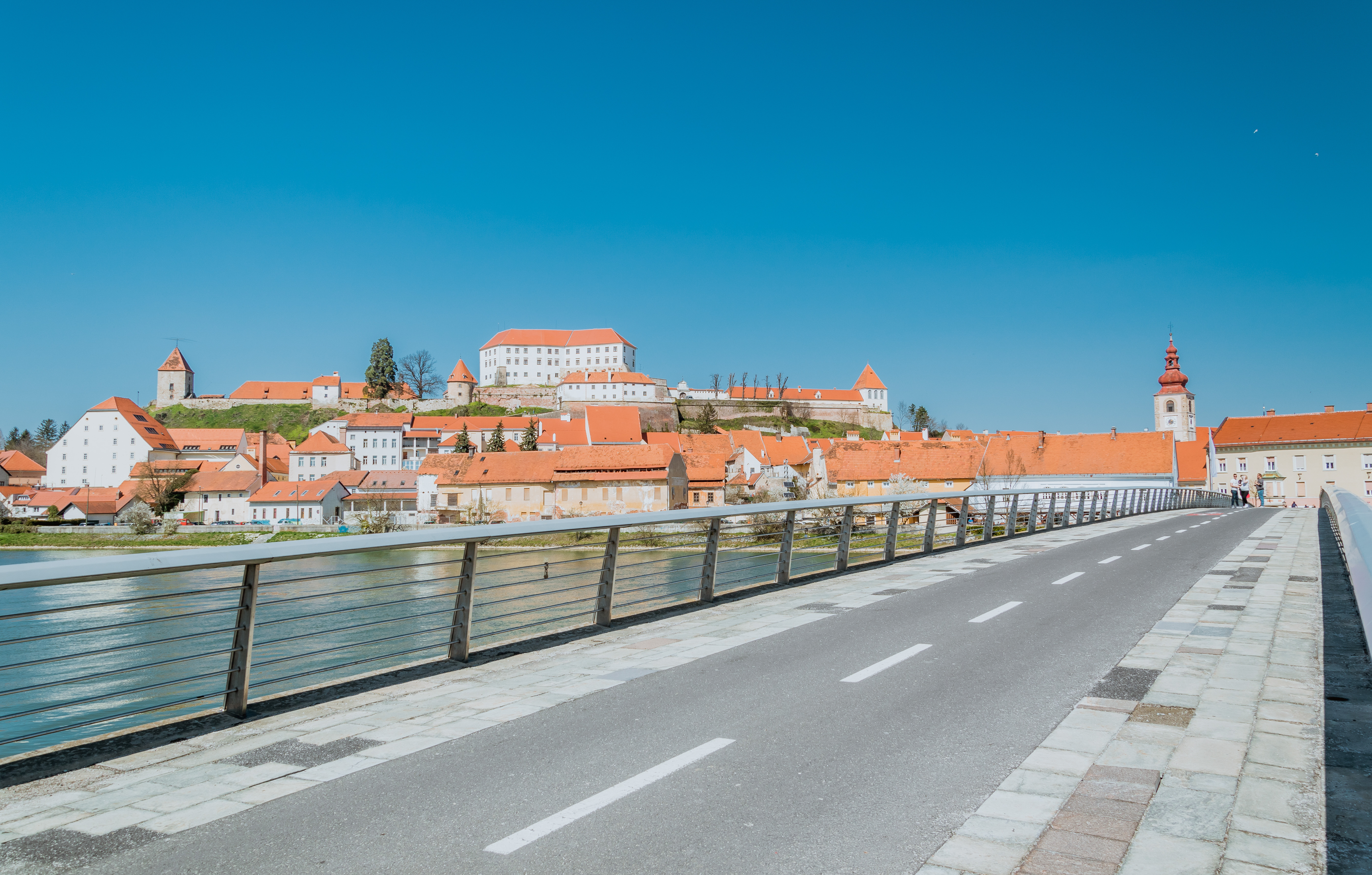
Footbridge in Ptuj, Slovenia (1997)

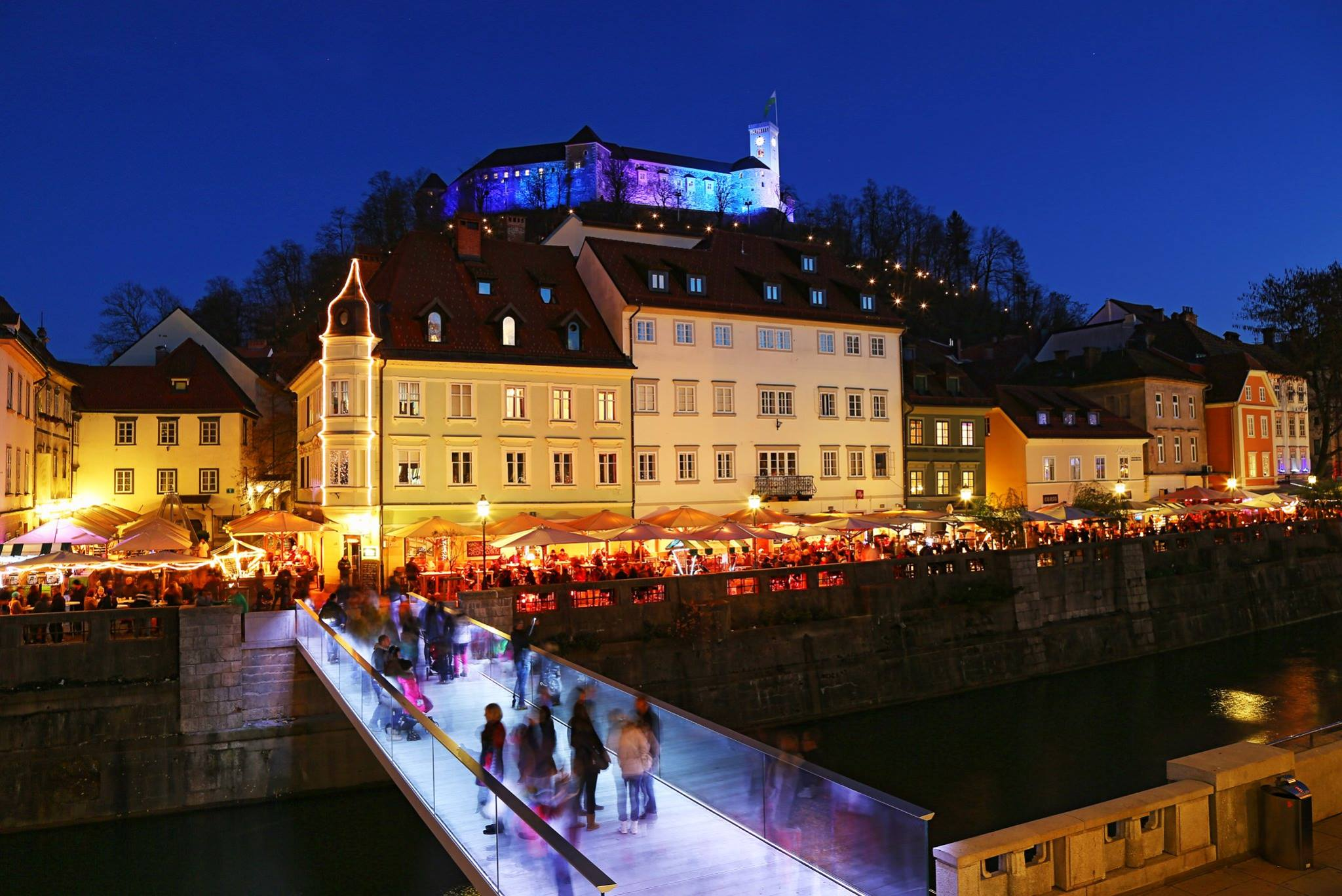
Ribja brv, Ljubljana, Slovenia (2014)

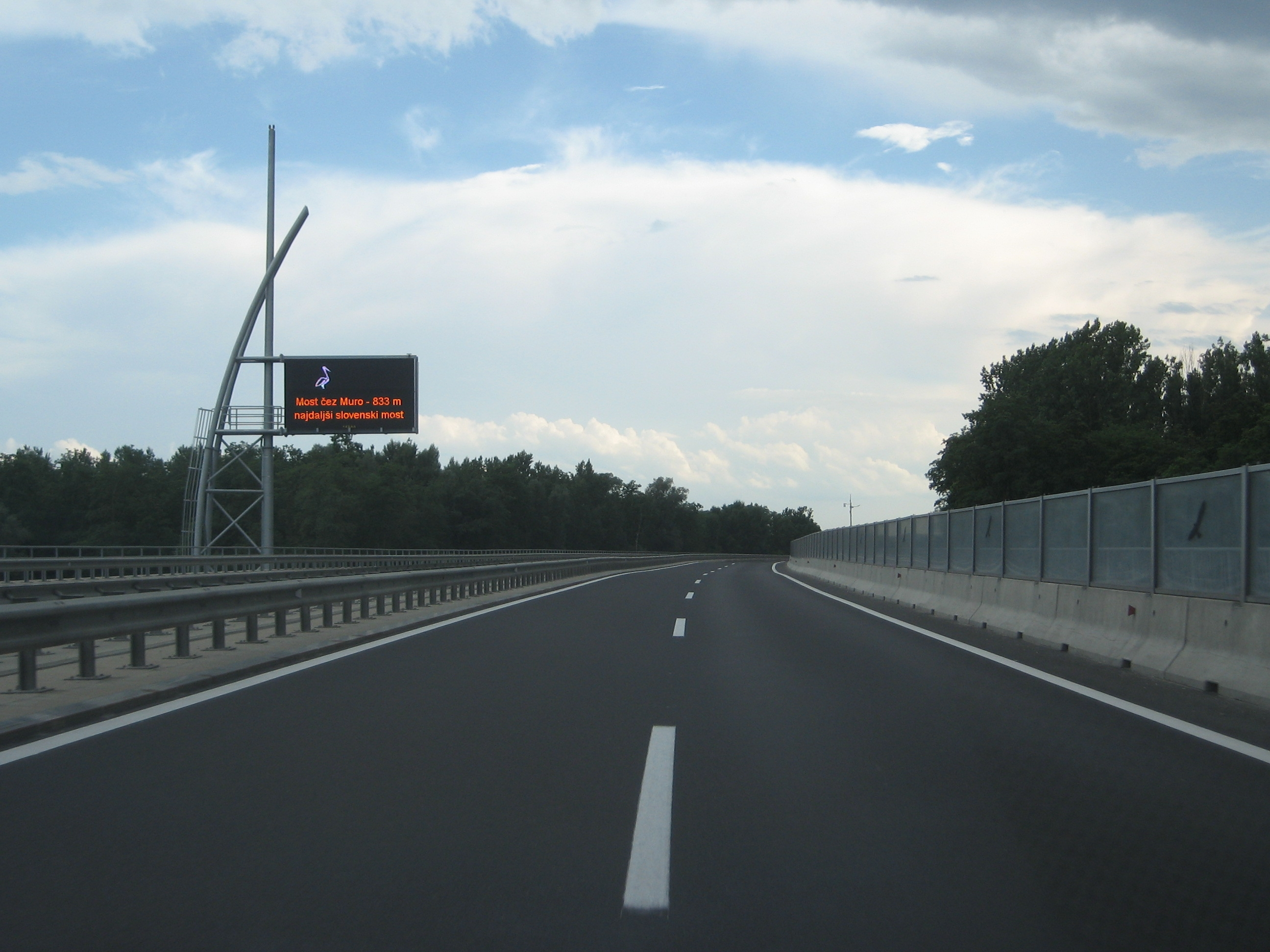
Bridge over Mura River, highway Vučja vas - Beltinci, Slovenia (2003)

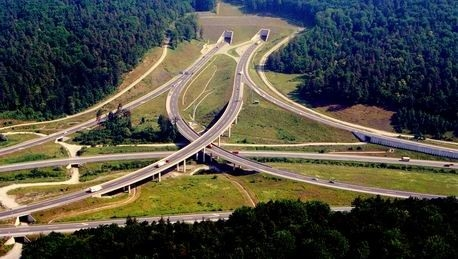
Malence Viaducts, Ljubljana, Slovenia (1998)

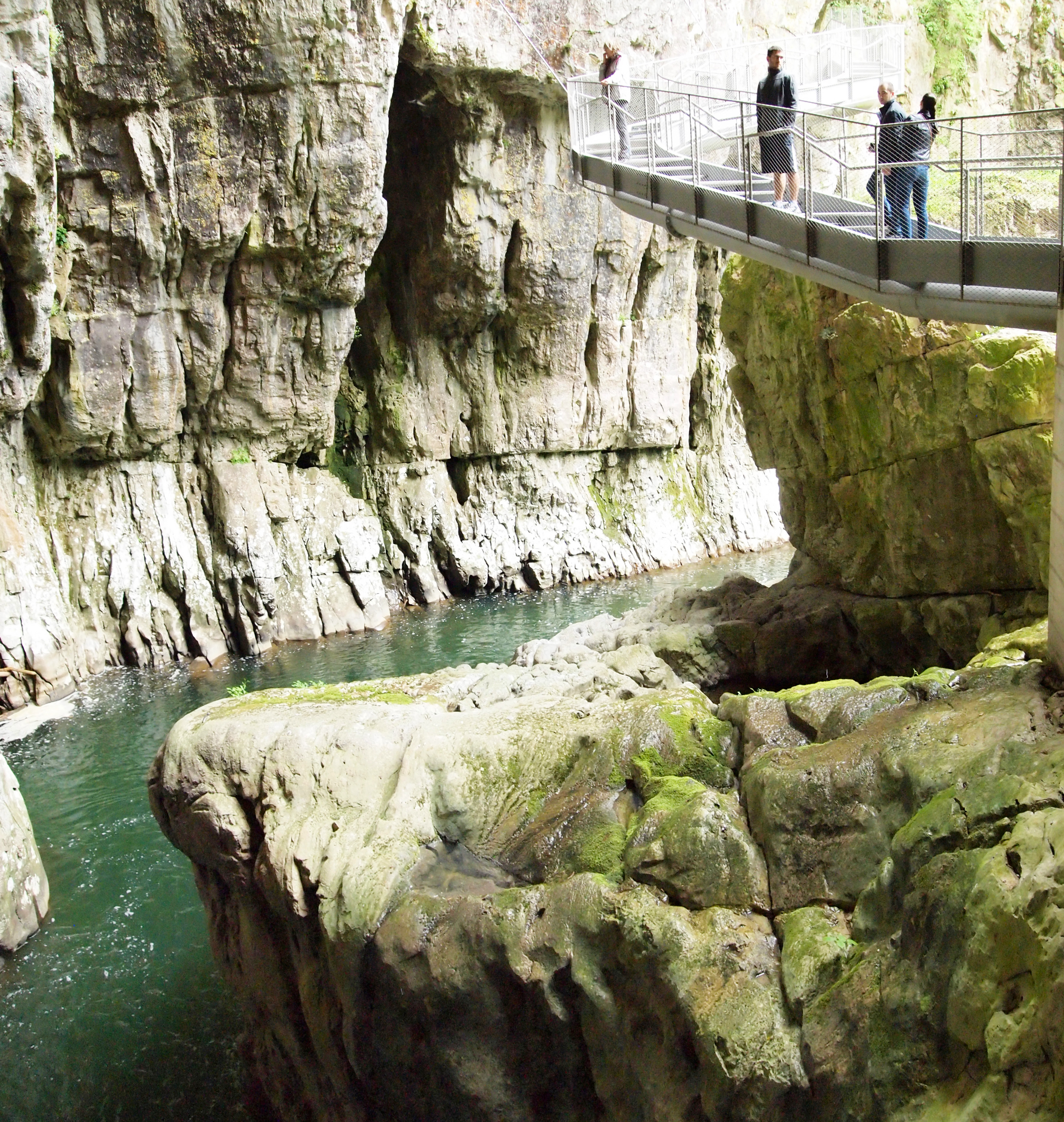
Marinič footbridge, Škocjan Caves Park, Slovenia (2010)

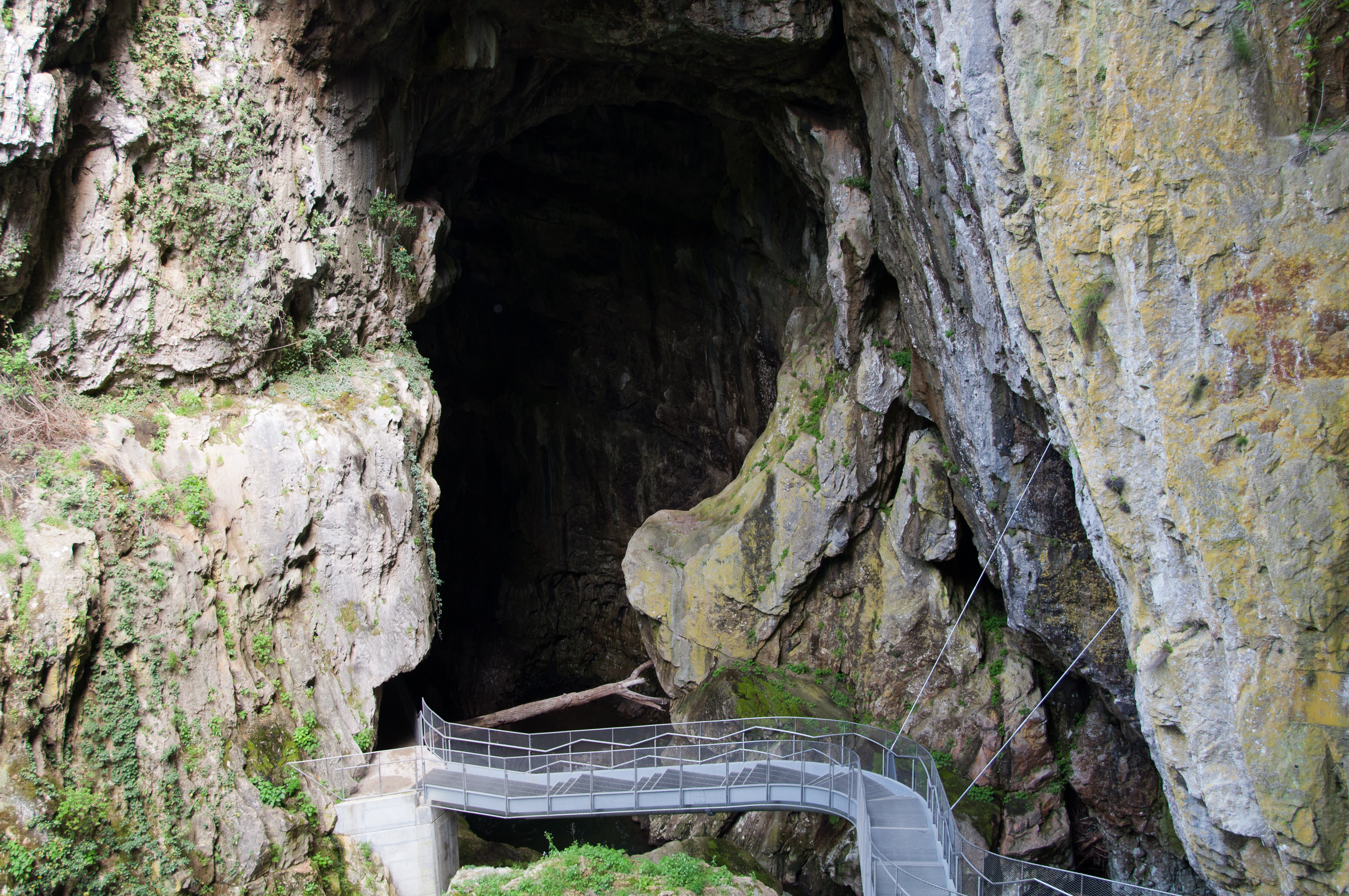
Marinič footbridge, Škocjan Caves Park, Slovenia (2010)

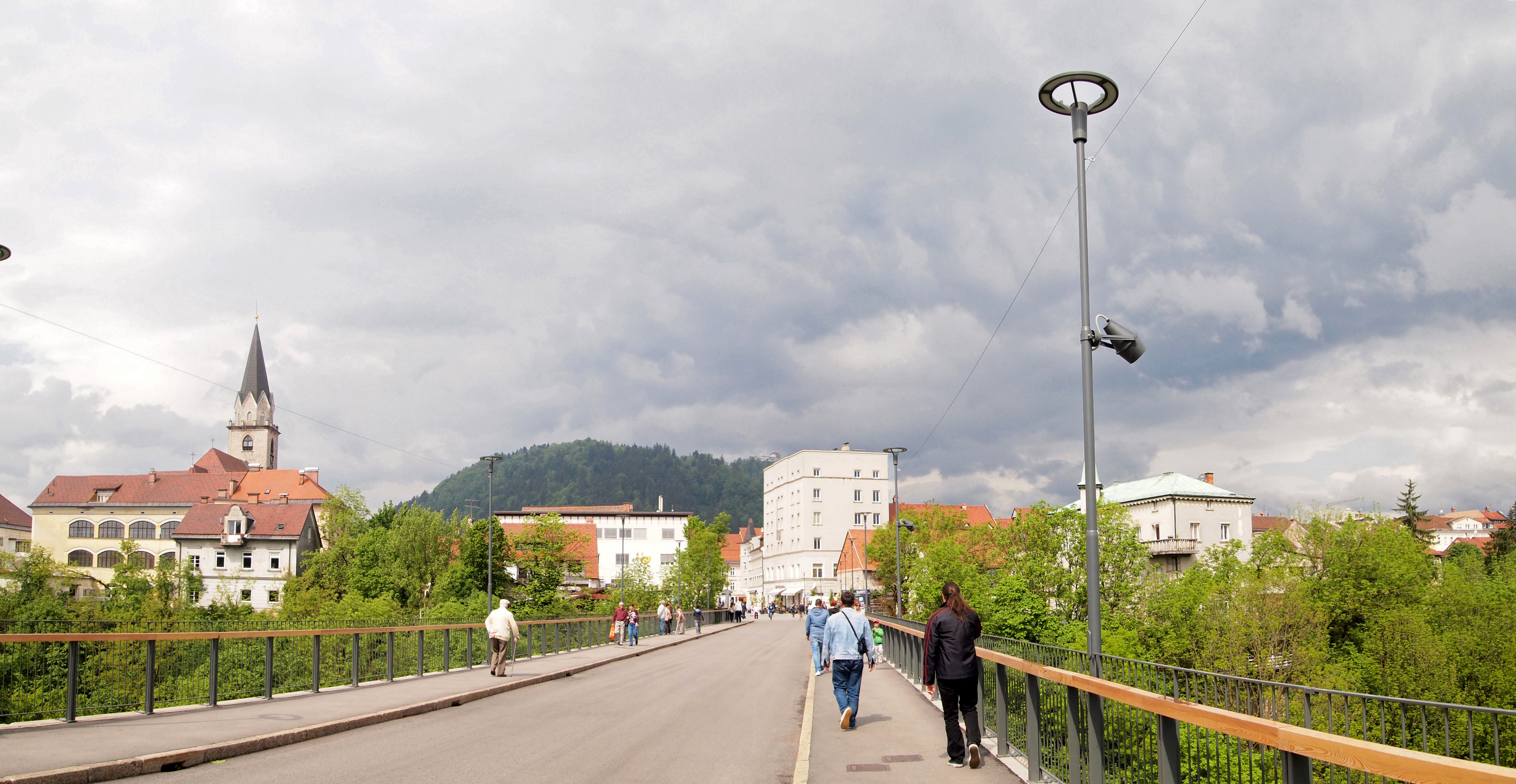
Bridge over Kokra River in Kranj (reconstruction, 1994)

== Awards ==
- 2019 Jožef Mrak Award for Pelješac Bridge
- 2019 Honorary City Certificate of Slovenska Bistrica to Dr. Viktor Markelj and Marjan Pipenbaher
- 2019 Polish Minister of Investment and Development Award to Footbridge to Ołowianka Island in Gdansk
- 2018 City of Gdansk Award to Footbridge to Ołowianka Island in Gdansk
- 2015 SCE Award to Viaduct Grobelno
- 2012 WEF Award to Ada Bridge Belgrade
- 2012 CES AWARD to Ada Bridge Belgrade
- 2012 AAB Award to Ada Bridge Belgrade
- 2011 Footbridge Award to Marinic Bridge
- 2009 City seal of Maribor to Studenci Footbridge Maribor
- 2009 Award CSS of CCIS to Studenci Footbridge Maribor
- 2008 Footbridge Award to Studenci Footbridge Maribor
- 2007 SCE Award to Puch Bridge over Drava in Ptuj
- 2004 SCE Award to Bridge over Mura River
- 2004 UM Award 2004: Golden recognition award to Mr. Marjan Pipenbaher and Mr. Viktor Markelj
- 1999 Award CSS of CCIS to Footbridge in Ptuj
