= Pedestrian and cycle bridge in Tremerje =

Bridge that crosses the Savinja, Slovenia

Pedestrian and cycle bridge over Savinja River in Tremerje
- Coordinates: 46°11′42″N 15°14′4″E
- Carries: Cyclists and pedestrians
- Crosses: River Savinja
- Locale: Tremerje, Slovenia
- Official name: Most za pešce in kolesarje v Tremerjah
- Owner: Municipality of Laško

Characteristics
- Design: Steel truss structure, Hi-Bond deck / Preasembled steel structure, cast in situ concrete
- Material: Steel
- Total length: 90 m
- Longest span: 80 m

History
- Designer: Ponting Bridges
- Constructed by: Adriaplan d.o.o.
- Construction start: 25. March 2018
- Construction end: 2019
- Construction cost: € 1.200.000
- Opened: April 2019

Location
- Interactive map of Pedestrian and cycle bridge over Savinja River in Tremerje

The pedestrian and cycle bridge in Tremerje is a bridge over the Savinja in Slovenia on the cycle route between Celje and Laško, part of the cycle route D1 Maribor-Celje-Trbovlje-Ljubljana-Koper. The bridge also provides access for pedestrians and cyclists from the Rifengozd area to the bus stop along the main road in Tremerje.

== Basic data ==
The bridge is designed with one span of length 80 m (260 ft), the total length of the structure is 90 m (300 ft). The main steel structure was designed as a space truss structure consisting of two longitudinal circular hollow profiles at the top and the bottom. The composite slab is designed as a reinforced concrete slab with a thickness of 15 to 22 cm (6 to 9 in).

== Cycle route ==
The cycling connection between Celje and Laško mostly runs along the left bank of the Savinja river, partly along existing local roads and public paths. In addition to the construction of a bridge for pedestrians and cyclists near Tremerje, the arrangements included the construction of a cycling path and pedestrian corridors, the construction of supporting structures, two rest areas and public lighting. The construction was financed by the Slovenian Infrastructure Agency.

== Gallery ==
Pedestrian and cyclist bridge in Tremerje

Pedestrian and cyclist bridge, with village Tremerje in the back

Steel truss structure, Hi-Bond deck
