= Ada Bridge =

Ada Bridge Мост на Ади Most na Adi
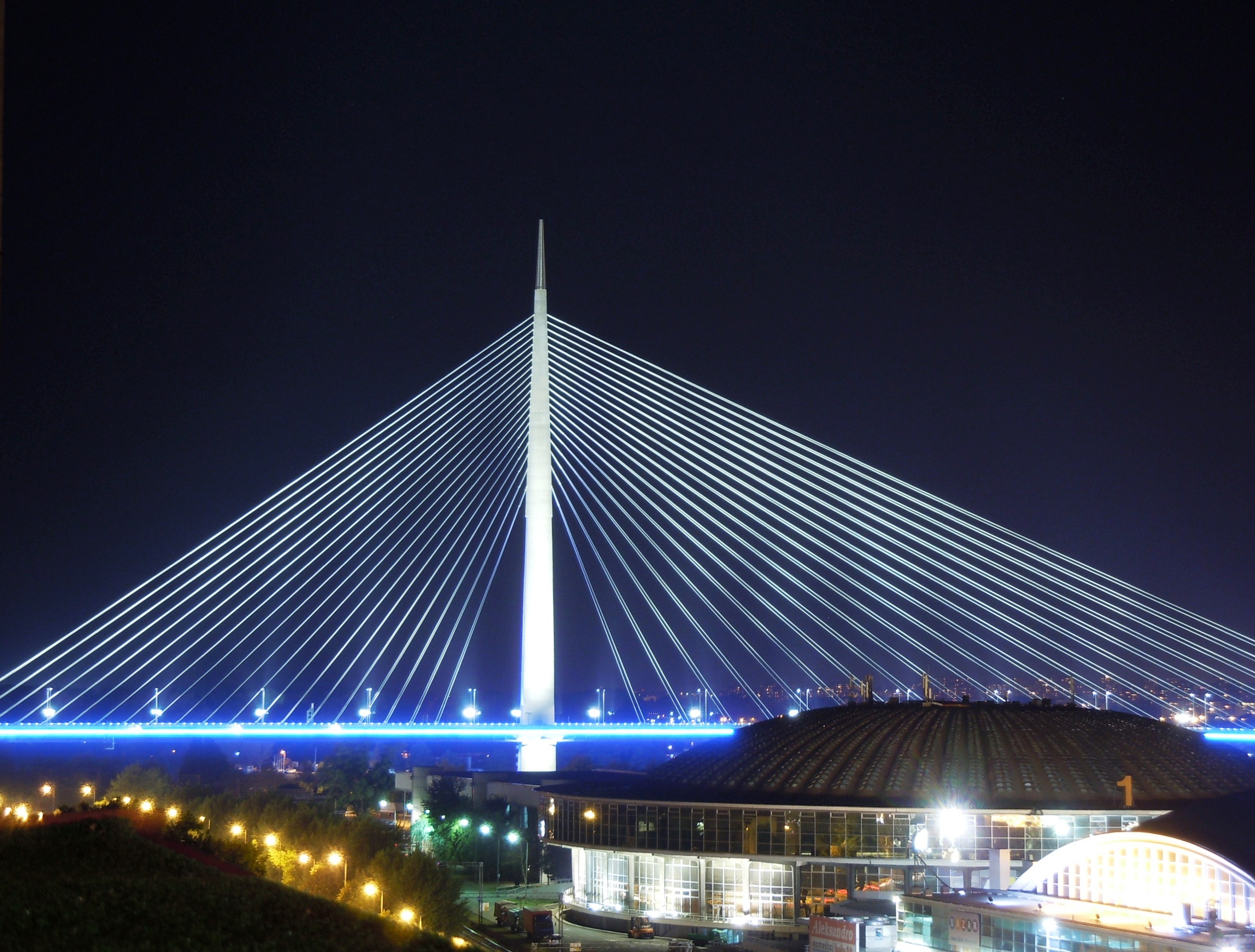
- Ada Bridge
- Coordinates: 44°47′42″N 20°25′36″E
- Carries: 6 lanes of future Belgrade Inner City Semi-Ring Road, 2 metro lanes and 2 pedestrian/bicycle lanes
- Crosses: Sava river
- Locale: Ada Ciganlija, Belgrade, Serbia
- Owner: City of Belgrade
- Maintained by: Belgrade Land Development Public Agency
- ID number: 1151753

Characteristics
- Design: Cable-stayed bridge, harp design, A-shaped design, single pylon, cable-stayed cradle-system
- Material: Steel rope, concrete pylon
- Total length: 996 m
- Width: 45.04 m
- Height: 200 m
- Longest span: 376 m
- No. of spans: Main span 376 m, side span 338 m, back span 250 m, end span
- Clearance below: 20 m

History
- Designer: Viktor Markelj and Peter Gabrijelčič
- Constructed by: Porr AG-SCT d.d.-DSD GmbH
- Construction start: 2008
- Construction end: 2011
- Construction cost: €360.2 million
- Opened: 1 January 2012 at 00:00

Location
- Interactive map of Ada Bridge Мост на Ади Most na Adi

The Ada Bridge (Serbian: Мост на Ади / Most na Adi) is a cable-stayed bridge over the Sava River in Belgrade, Serbia. The bridge crosses the tip of Ada Ciganlija island, connecting the municipalities of Čukarica and New Belgrade. The bridge pylon is located at the tip of the island, which has been reinforced with large amounts of concrete and has been slightly enlarged to provide stronger foundations. Construction began in 2008, and the bridge opened on 1 January 2012. Adjoining roads were completed in 2013.

Immediately after the design was announced, it polarized both the professionals and politicians. Those who were in favor of the bridge claimed it is the most beautiful and the most functional of all Belgrade bridges, while those against it called it a megalomaniacal, too expensive, and unnecessary. However, since becoming fully operational in 2012, the bridge has become one of the city's symbols and "inescapable décor in music videos and movies", but also in video cards, commercials, etc. It is referred to as the "most representative bridge in the capital".

== Location ==
Ada Bridge is the most upstream Belgrade bridge over the Sava river within the urban area. Additionally, the bridge is the only direct connection between the municipalities of New Belgrade (Blokovi) and Čukarica (Banovo Brdo). The bridge pylon is located on the tip of the Ada Ciganlija island.

== History ==
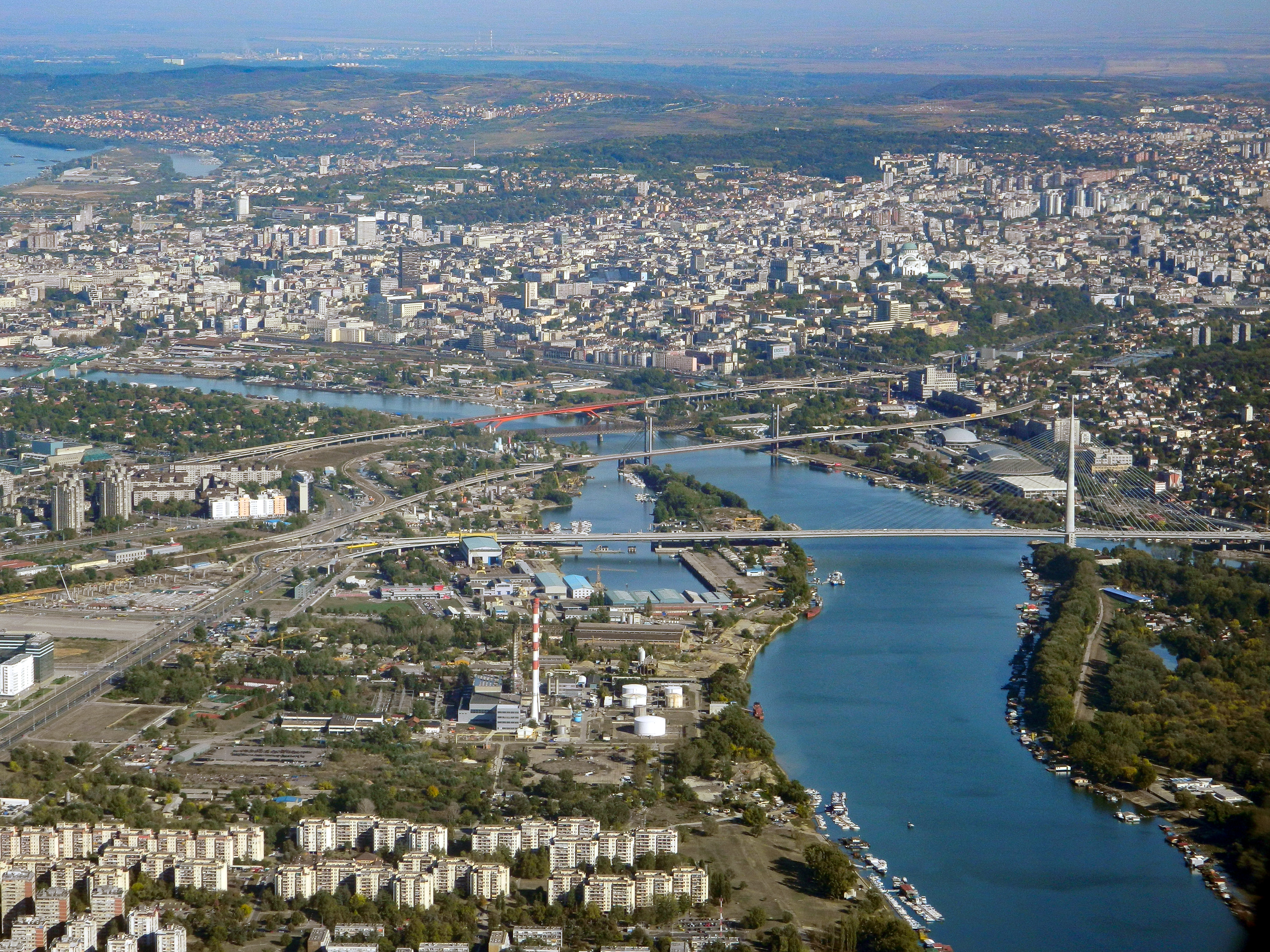
Ada Bridge in front of the other Belgrade bridges

In 1923, architect Đorđe Kovaljevski created the first urbanization plan of the area that envisaged a bridge over Ada Ciganlija. The initial idea of what is today known as the Belgrade Inner City Semi-Ring Road, to which the bridge is an important part, was created at that time. This road was part of several plans under different names, such as the Main Ring Road, Transverse Road, Eastern Tangent Road, each with slightly different routes. All the plans had one thing in common: the Ada Ciganlija Bridge. In early plans, the bridge was placed closer to the Lake, while the final project placed the bridge on the very tip of the island due to ecological concerns about the lake.

After World War II, when Belgrade was left without any motorway bridges over the Sava, this route had no precedence, as narrower and closer to downtown locations had a priority. The project was pushed aside until the early 2000s.

== Etymology ==
The name was chosen by the popular vote, though the name Most na Adi (literally, Bridge on Ada) became a colloquial name for the bridge already during its construction. Novi most (New bridge) is a frequently used unofficial name for the bridge. Among the other proposed names was Harfa (the harp), because of its look. Some of the linguists asserted that the only correct version can be Most preko Ade (Bridge across, or over, Ada), but their other colleagues said that this version is also correct.

== Design ==
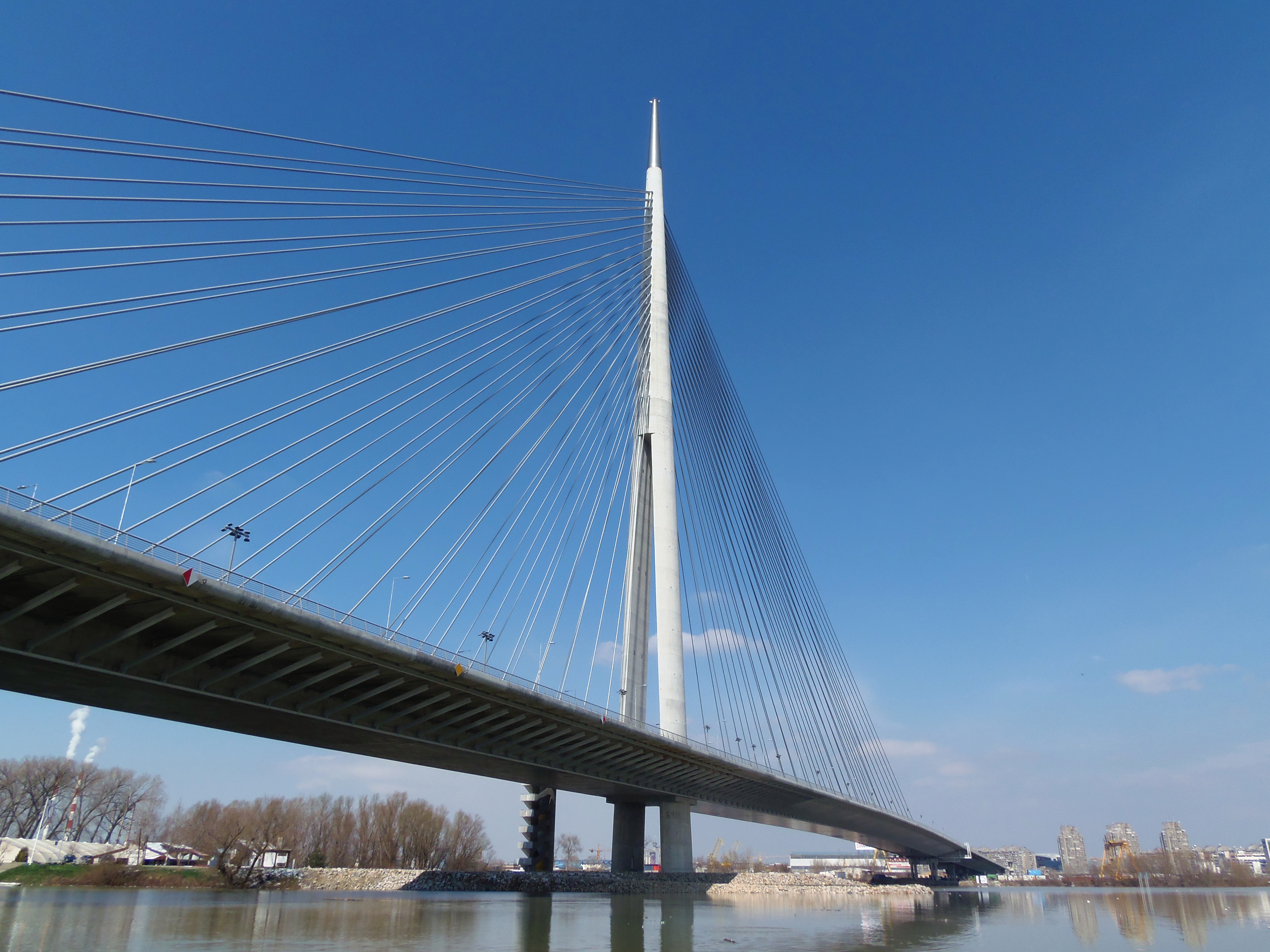
Cable-stayed design with a single pylon

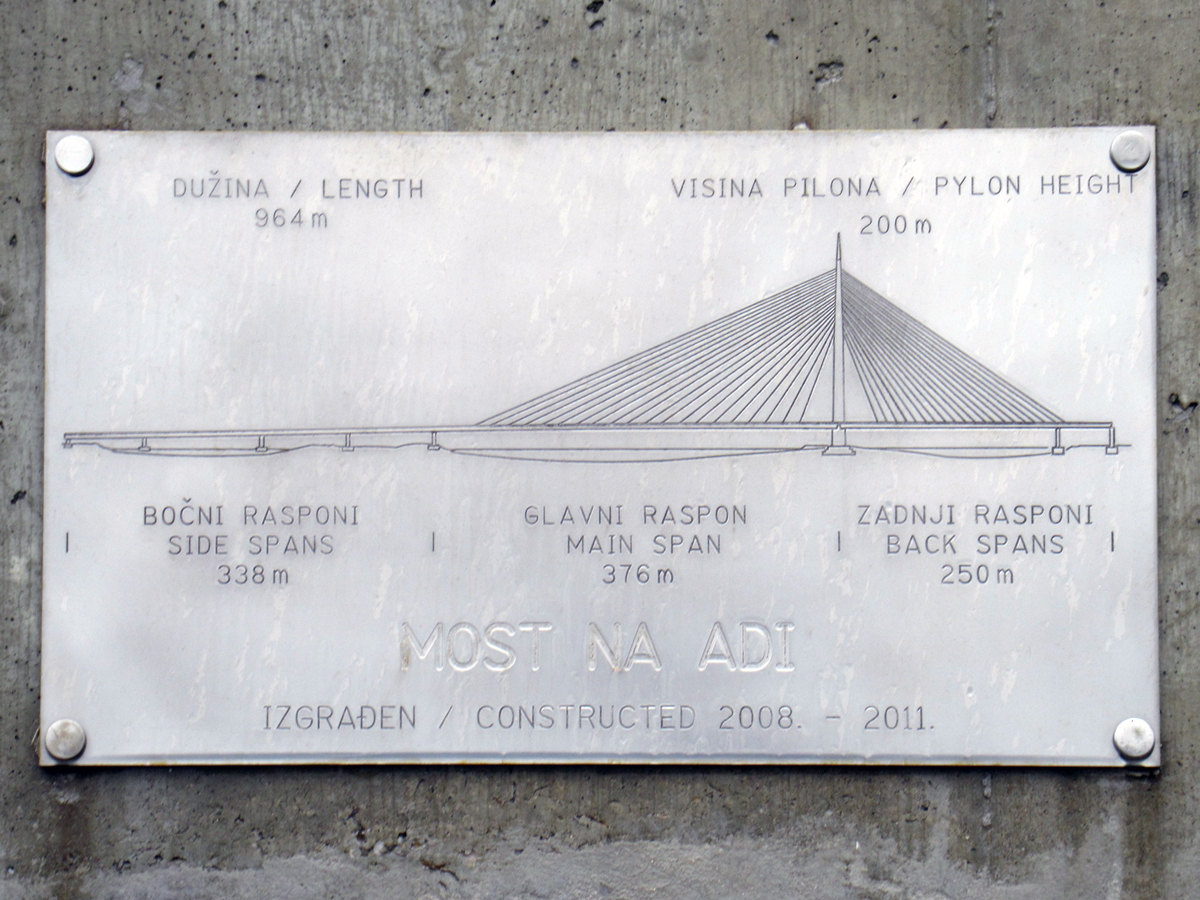
plaque about the bridge

The competition for the preliminary design of the bridge was held in 2004. Twelve companies submitted bids, with the winning design by the Slovenian company Ponting. The bridge designers were the architects Viktor Markelj and Peter Gabrijelčič. The winning conceptual design was unanimously selected by the jury, which was chaired by Nikola Hajdin, President of the Serbian Academy of Sciences and Arts and the architect of the New Railroad Bridge. The Belgrade Association of Architects also endorsed the project, assessing it as contemporary and relevant to the future skyline of Belgrade. The design was awarded the first prize by Hajdin's jury in 2005 and was officially selected in 2006.

The bridge is a cable-stayed design with a single pylon. The foundation for the pylon is a circular diaphragm wall with 113 bored piles. The main span is constructed from 8,600 tons of bridge construction steel (grade S355J2+N), supported by 80 stay cables, and is counterbalanced by a post-tensioned, reinforced concrete back span of 200 m (660 ft). The approach towards New Belgrade is constructed as a 388m post-tensioned, reinforced concrete side span as a continuous beam box girder with a similar arrangement of deck as the back span. Component parts of the deck were manufactured in China and delivered in transportable units on a sea and river-route via Rotterdam through the Rhine–Main–Danube Canal to the pre-assembly yard next to the construction site at Mala Ciganlija in Belgrade. The stay cables used to support the bridge deck have a maximum length of approximately 373 m (1,224 ft), and in total, 1280 tons of high-grade steel are used for the 80 cables with up to 91 strands.

The bridge is designed to significantly reduce traffic passing through the city centre, up to 40%, and the older Gazela Bridge. The traffic over the bridge is projected at 12,000 vehicles per hour. There is also a possibility that it will be used for the future Belgrade Metro lines. It is also planned to be part of the future Belgrade Inner City Semi-Ring Road. It will have three road lanes and a tram (light rail) track in each direction.

== Construction ==
=== Bridge ===
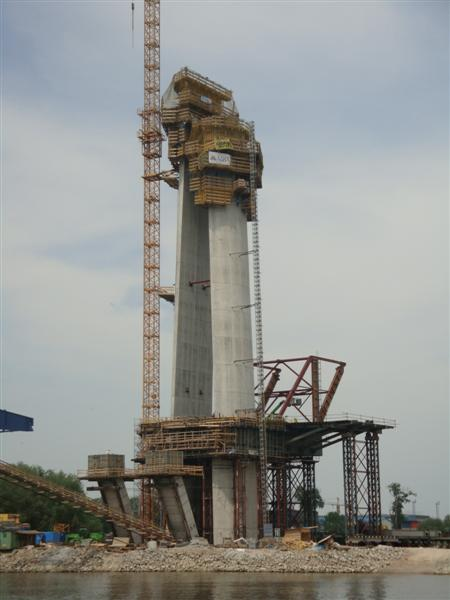
Pylon under construction (May 2010)

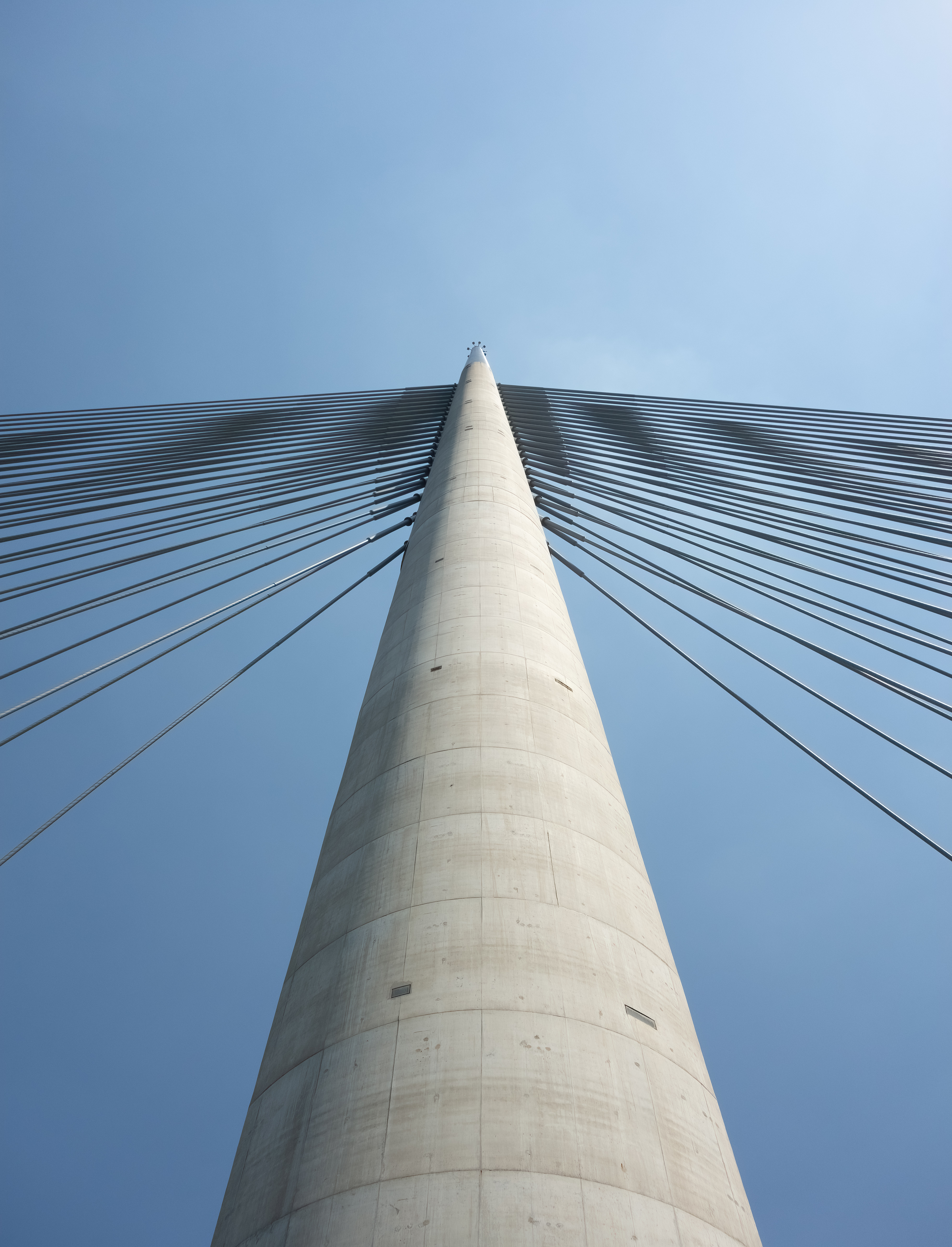
Finished pylon (July 2021)

According to the original, "most optimistic" plans, the bridge was to be finished in 2008. However, it was a year when the construction began. In December 2008, the main works started on the right bank of the Sava, when the testing piers for the first pillar, out of seven in total. The deadline was 40 months, and the projected cost €118 million. It soon became apparent that the price would be higher while the problems showed on the ground. Several constructors went bankrupt, and it appeared that the deadline might be extended a lot. However, the construction continued as planned, and the two sides of the bridge were connected in August 2011. Later that year, the construction ended and the bridge was opened to public traffic on 1 January 2012 at 00:00, when crowds of citizens and tourists gathered, crossing over it.

The design envisioned the grid-like cone to be placed on top of the pylon, but as of September 2018, it appears that the idea was scrapped altogether. In May 2012, the placement of the cone carried by a helicopter was attempted, but due to the strong winds, the operation was aborted and rescheduled for some other time. After the government change in 2013, it was claimed that the entire new paperwork was needed to install the top, but nothing has been done.

=== Other parts of the project ===
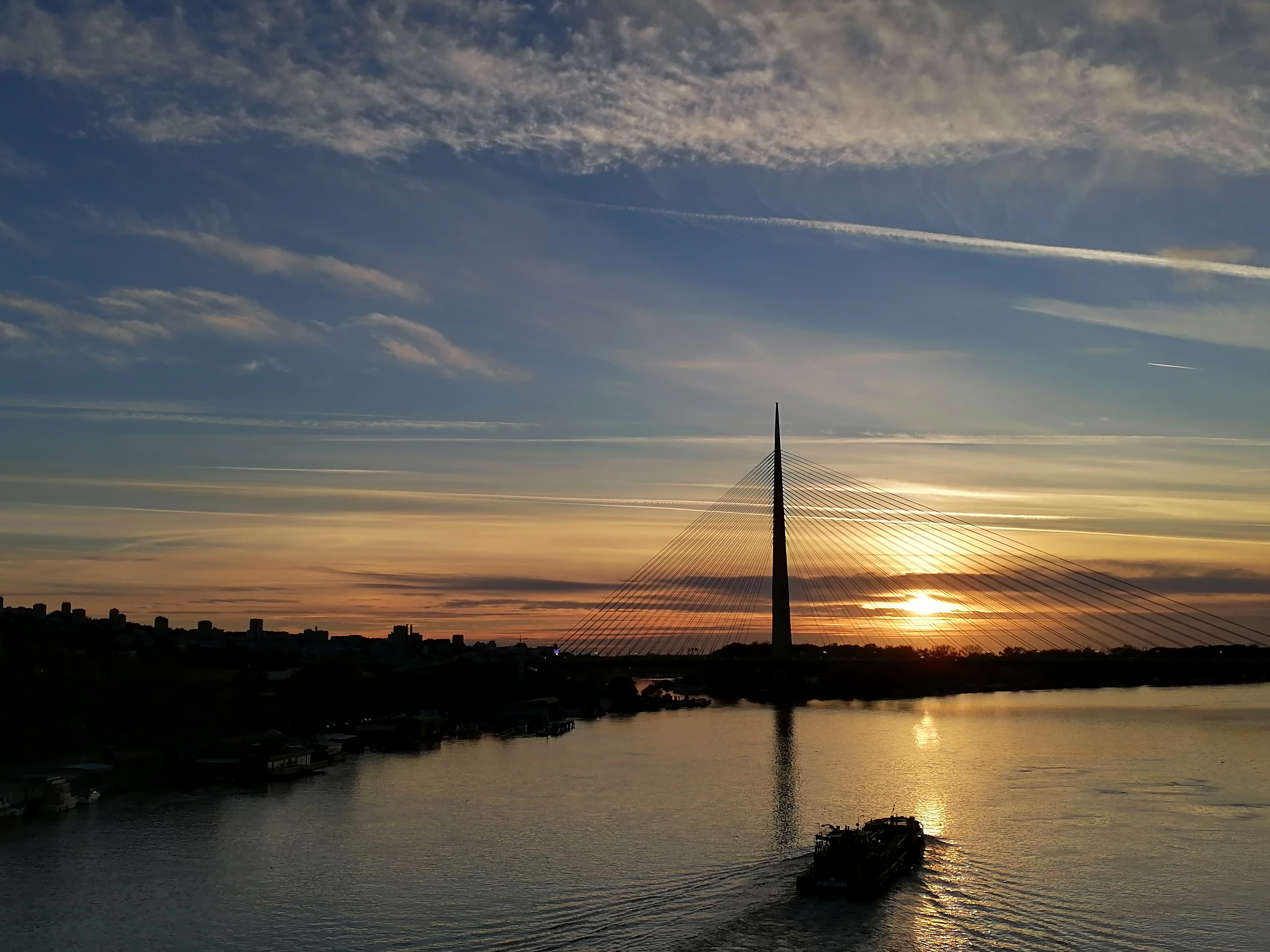

Though in use since January 2012, by December 2017, the official exploitation permit still hadn't been issued for the bridge. In the summer of 2017, the bridge was connected to Tošin Bunar Street via the newly constructed boulevard which was named after the combatants in the 1999 Battle of Košare. As of January 2018, there are still three major construction undertakings for the bridge to become fully functional as projected and to fulfill its intended purpose. The ventures include the tram tracks laying, construction of the road connections towards the neighborhood of Rakovica, and drilling of the Topčider tunnel.

In 2016, city officials announced that the first trams would cross over the bridge in 2017. But a request for tender, concerning the construction of the tram tracks over the bridge, was distributed by the city government only in December 2016, and it failed. It was repeated in December 2017. The project included 2.7 km (1.7 mi) of a new, dual-gauge tracks, with connections to the existing routes in New Belgrade and Banovo Brdo. The deadline for the tender was January 2018, so the trams should become operational in 2019. From the New Belgrade side, the connection was made at the Đorđa Stanojevića Street, continuing over the embankment and the northern access road to the center of the bridge. On the Čukarica side, it was connected to the existing route at the border of Banovo Brdo and Rakovica. Places for the future additional tram stations, right at the end points of the bridge, were already allocated. Among the other additional works, the already existing elevated track across the Topčiderka River, was removed, but the pillars were preserved and used for the new track bridge. Some preparatory works began in March 2018 and later that month city signed a contract with "Energoprojekt holding", which won the bidding. Construction was to last for 420 days. After a month-long testing, the tram traffic across the bridge started on 4 July 2019. Initially, two lines crossed the bridge: No. 11L (Tašmajdan-Block 45) and No. 13 (Banovo Brdo-Block 45). However, six months after the opening, works on the tracks continued, while the new tender in December 2019 revealed numerous flaws in the previous project, citing "incomprehensible reasons".

The construction of the road connection with Rakovica includes the relocation of the Topčiderka riverbed for 1 km (0.62 mi), construction of a new bridge across the Pere Velimirovića Street in Rakovica's neighborhood of Kanarevo Brdo and reconstruction and widening of the Bulevar patrijarha Pavla which is designated to be the most important traffic route in this part of Belgrade. It is envisioned as the main transit corridor which would connect the European route E75 (Belgrade-Niš highway), New Belgrade, Ada Bridge, Patrijarha Dimitrija Street, Ibar Highway, Kružni put and the Belgrade bypass. As of January 2018, the timeline of this project is unknown, as only a partial request for tendering was announced. The works on the relocation of the river began on 1 March 2018, and the road bridge became operational on 22 March 2019. Further widening of the boulevard along the Topčiderka river began in the late summer of 2019 and was set to finish in the spring of 2021, but in December 2020 the deadline was moved to September 2021, then to May 2022, and to October 2022, before it was announced that the connection will be fully established only in the summer of 2024.

For the Topčider tunnel, which would directly connect the bridge with Autokomanda interchange on the European route E75, the detailed regulatory plan and the conceptual design are finished and the tendering for the project was announced for later in 2018. In December 2020 city administration talked again about the tunnel, but without any specificities or dates.

The bridge was finally granted the exploitation permit in December 2019, after already being in use for 8 years. As of August 2021, bridge's elevators for pedestrians and cyclists are still not operational.

=== Contractors ===
The construction was commissioned by the Belgrade Land Development Public Agency and co-financed by the City of Belgrade, the European Bank for Reconstruction and Development, European Investment Bank and several private financiers.

The contract for a Project Manager and Engineer was awarded to Louis Berger Group. Their job was to provide support to the City of Belgrade in all aspects of project cycle management, including design review, preparation of works documentation, procurement, works supervision and contract administration.

Engineering and construction of the bridge was awarded to a consortium of three companies, Porr AG from Austria, Slovenija ceste Tehnika from Slovenia and DSD Brückenbau GmbH from Germany. The consortium engaged several subcontractors, including Leonhardt, Andrä und Partner from Germany, China Railway Shanhaiguan Bridge Group from China, Vorspann Technik from Germany, BBR from Switzerland, the University of Belgrade's Faculty of Mining and Geology, Eusani-Hortmanns-Zahlten Ingenieurgesellschaft from Germany, Ponting from Slovenia, BBV from Germany and the Institute Kirilo Savić from Belgrade. The North Approach Road's detailed design was by Hidroprojekt – saobraćaj from Belgrade. the South Approach Road's detailed design was by Centar za puteve Vojvodine from Novi Sad, and the Paštroviceva Street detailed design was by IM Projekt from Belgrade.

== Controversies ==
As soon as the design was revealed, criticism of the project began. Everything about the bridge was disapproved, starting with the location itself, which some labeled as wrong. The environmentalists claimed it will destroy the habitat of the pygmy cormorant, which winters in great numbers on the Ada Ciganlija and the Čukarica Bay. The size was also denounced and the bridge was labeled as a megalomaniacal project. The general appearance and the price of the bridge were blasted with questions being asked about the design (why it has a 200 m (660 ft) high pylon or the stays) or it has been proclaimed as unnecessary in general.

Only when it was open for traffic, it was announced that the total costs of the project, including the access roads and interchanges will be over €400 million. Also, it was clear that the bridge won't work in its full capacity for a long time as numerous other parts of the projects remained unfinished or just on the paper.

== In popular culture ==
The Ada Bridge was featured in the fifth episode of season nine of the Discovery Channel documentary television series Build It Bigger.

The bridge became one of the symbols of Belgrade. It became a "must" in the music videos, TV serials or movies shot in Belgrade. It is filmed in numerous commercials, video cards and photo shoots.

In February 2022, Serbian singer Teodora released a single named "Most na Adi", after the bridge.

== See also ==
- Bridges of Belgrade
- List of bridges in Serbia
- List of road–rail bridges
