= Viktor Markelj =

Slovenian civil engineer

- Born: 9 March 1958 (age 67); Zgornja Bistrica, Slovenia, Yugoslavia
- Education: University of Maribor - Faculty of Civil Engineering
- Engineering career
- Discipline: Civil engineer
- Institutions: Slovenian Association of Civil Engineering (IZS); International Association for Bridge and Structural Engineering (IABSE) 'Fédération Internationale du Béton' (FIB); Slovenian Association of Structural Engineers (SDGK)
- Practice name: Ponting Bridges
- Projects: Ada Bridge in Belgrade (2012), drawbridge in Gdańsk (2017) and Puch Bridge in Ptuj (2007).

Viktor Markelj (born 9 March 1958) is a Slovenian structural engineer and bridge specialist.

== Career ==
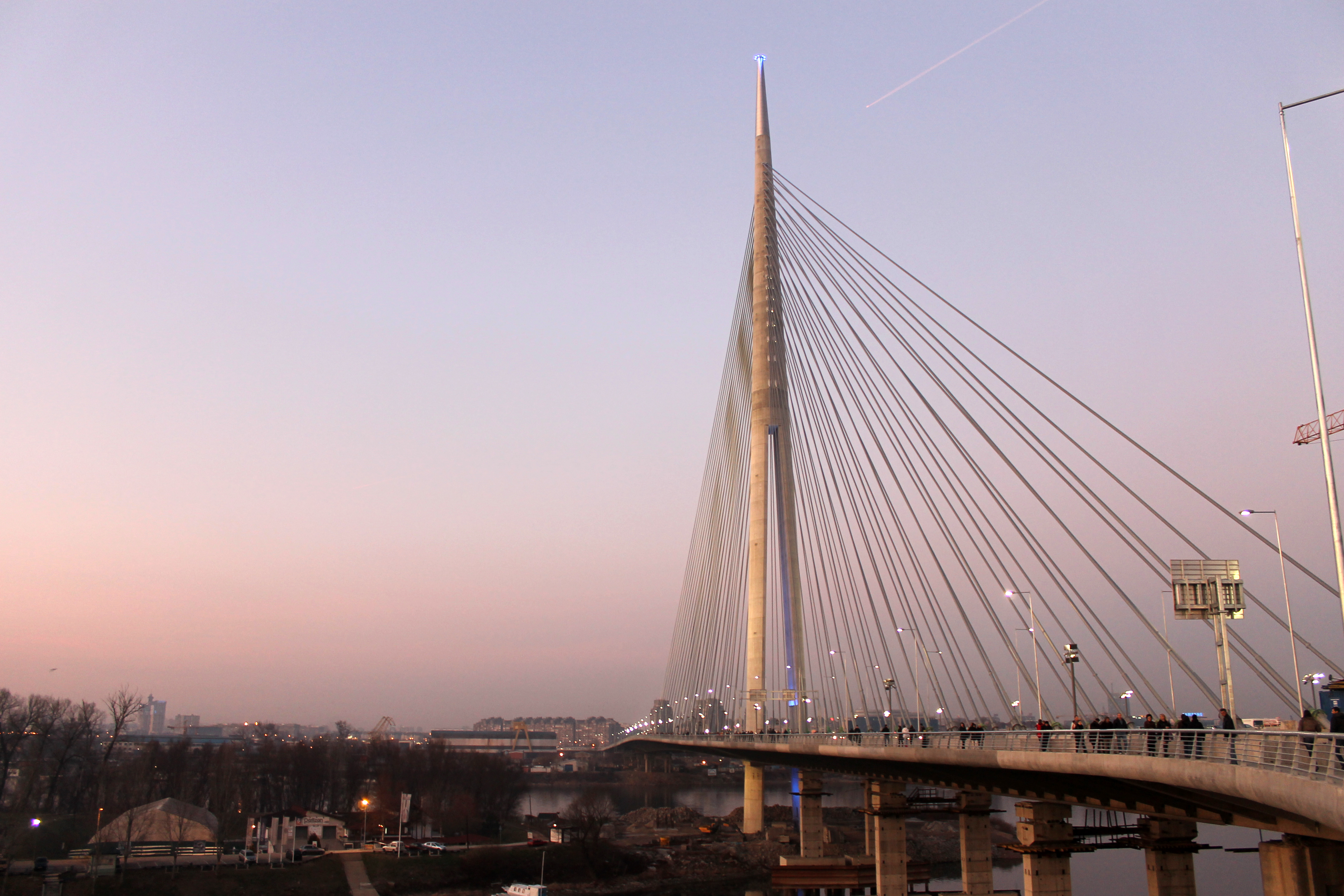
Ada Bridge in Belgrade, Serbia

Markelj graduated from the University of Maribor - Faculty of Civil Engineering in 1982. He obtained a PhD degree in civil engineering at Faculty of Civil Engineering, Transportation Engineering and Architecture in Maribor in 2016, under the joint supervision of Branko Bedenik and Zlatko Šavor. His doctoral dissertation focused on Innovations in incremental launching method of bridge construction.

From 1981 he worked at Gradis Design Office where he participated in designing of several large bridges and viaducts constructed by Gradis. In 1990, he and Marjan Pipenbaher founded Ponting Bridges, a Slovenian studio for structural engineering, focusing mainly on bridge structures, with headquarters in Maribor. The practice is led by a duo of its founders, Dr. Viktor Markelj and Marjan Pipenbaher, and has constructed many high-profile bridges.

His high-profile bridges include Ada Bridge in Belgrade, Serbia (2012), drawbridge in Gdańsk, Poland (2017) and Puch Bridge in Ptuj, Slovenia (2007). He lives in Slovenska Bistrica.

He is a lecturer in bridges at the Faculty of Civil Engineering in Maribor since 2003.

== Major projects ==
Major projects, by year of completion and ordered by type, are:

=== Bridges ===
- Bridge over Mura River, highway Vučja vas–Beltinci, Slovenia (2003)
- Puch Bridge, Ptuj, Slovenia (2007)
- Viaduct Šumljak, highway Razdrto–Selo, Slovenia (2009)
- Viaduct Lešnica North / South, Slovenia (2007/2011)
- Ada Bridge, Belgrade, Serbia (2012)
- NAR Viaducts, Belgrade, Serbia (2018)

=== Over- and underpasses ===
- Arch overpass 4-3 in Kozina, Slovenia (1997)
- Underpass in Celje, Slovenia (2004)
- Overpass 4-6 in Slivnica, Slovenia (2008)
- Viaduct/overpass Grobelno, Slovenia (2015)

=== Pedestrian and cyclist bridges ===
- Footbridge over Soča, Bovec, Slovenia (2007)
- Studenci footbridge, Maribor, Slovenia (2007)
- Marinič footbridge, Škocjan Caves Park, Slovenia (2010)
- Ribja brv, Ljubljana, Slovenia (2014)
- Pedestrian and cyclist drawbridge to Ołowianka Island, Gdansk, Poland (2017)
- Langur Way Canopy Walk, Penang Hill, Malaysia (2018)
- Tremerje Footbridge, Laško, Slovenia (2019)

=== Tunnels and galleries ===
- Tunnel Malečnik, Maribor, Slovenia (2009)
- Arcade gallery Meljski hrib, Maribor, Slovenia (2012)

=== Selected works ===
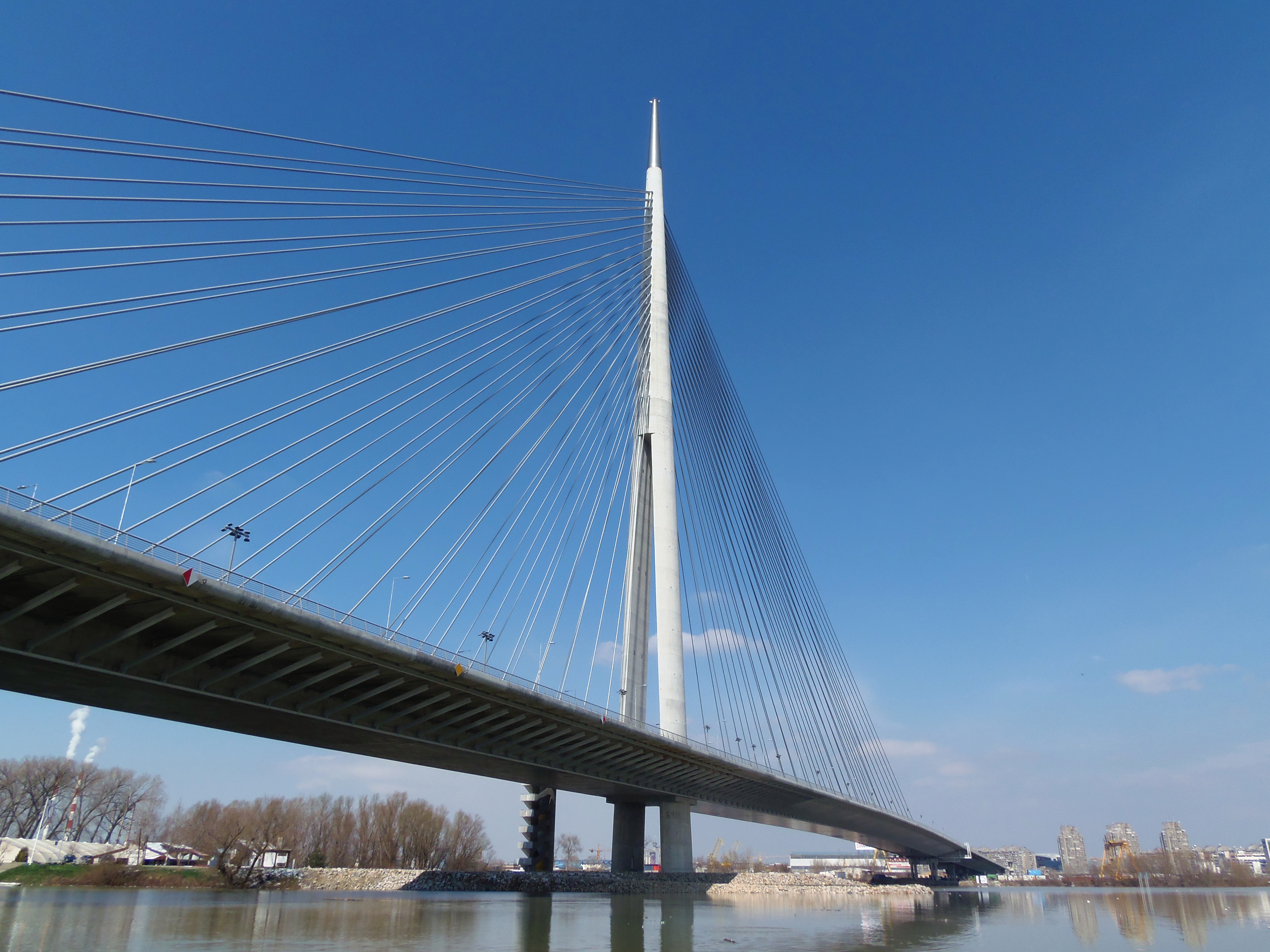
Ada Bridge, Belgrade, Serbia (2012)

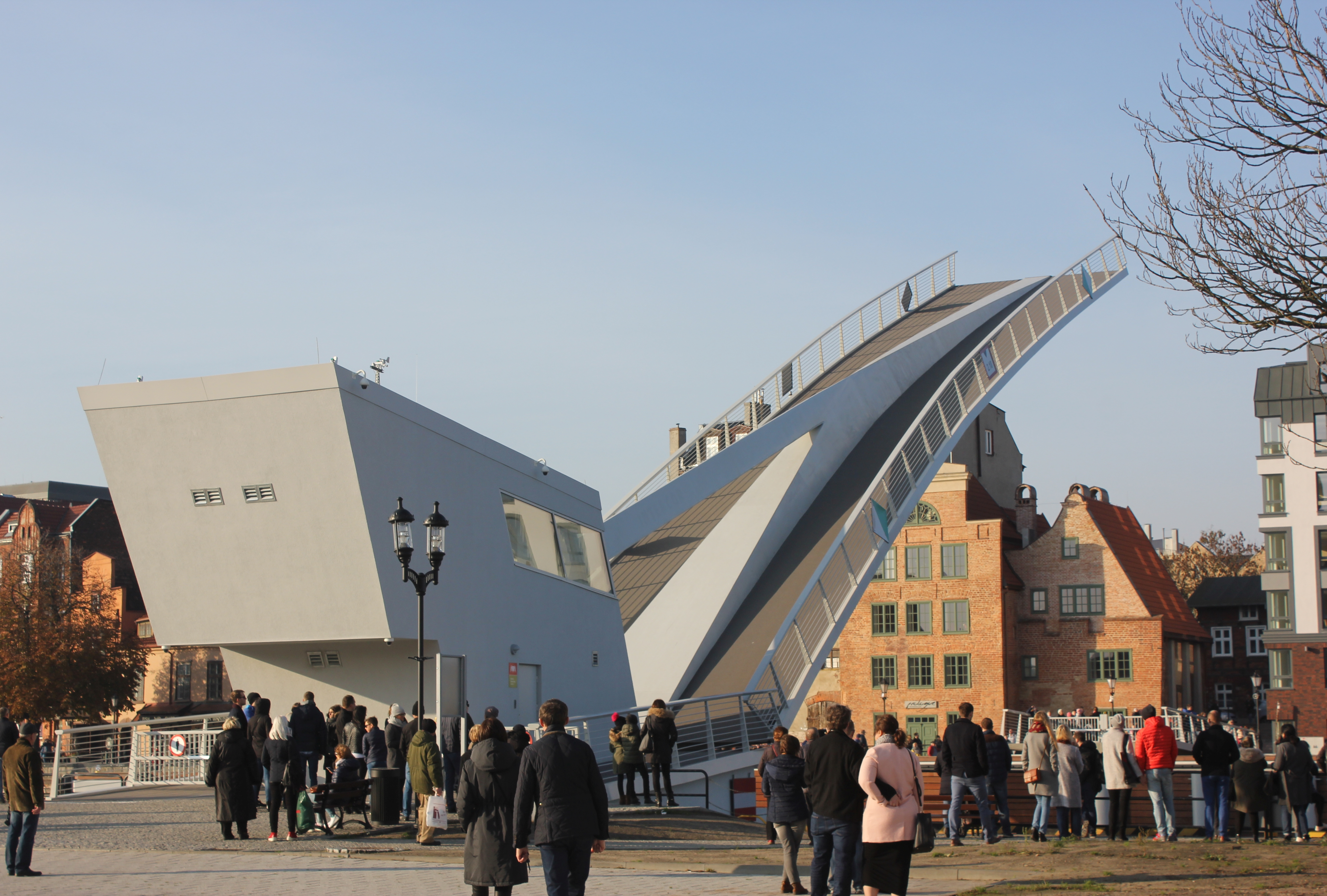
Pedestrian and cyclist drawbridge to Ołowianka Island, Gdańsk, Poland (2017)

Pedestrian and cyclist bridge Tremerje, Slovenia (2019)

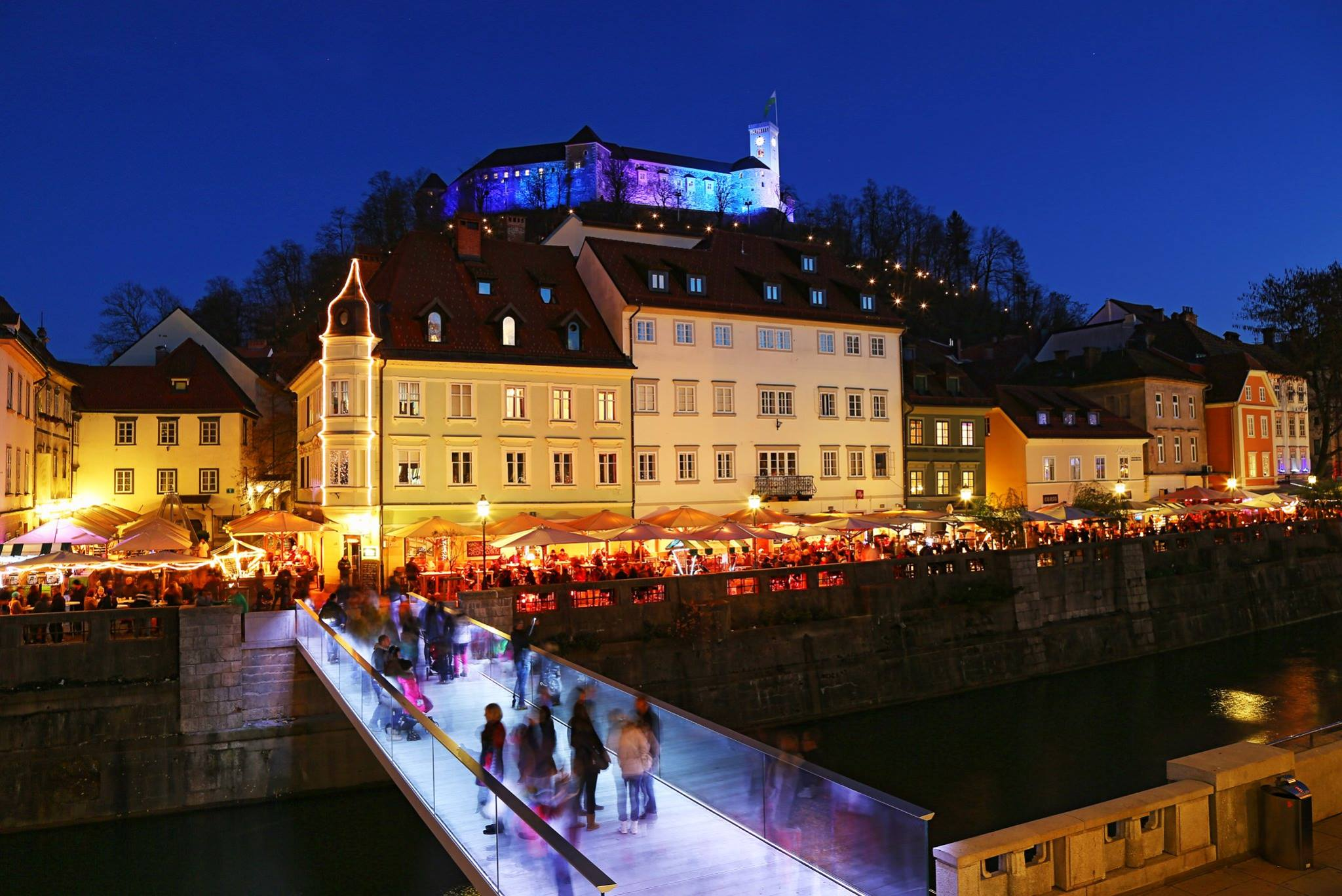
Ribja brv, Ljubljana, Slovenia (2014)

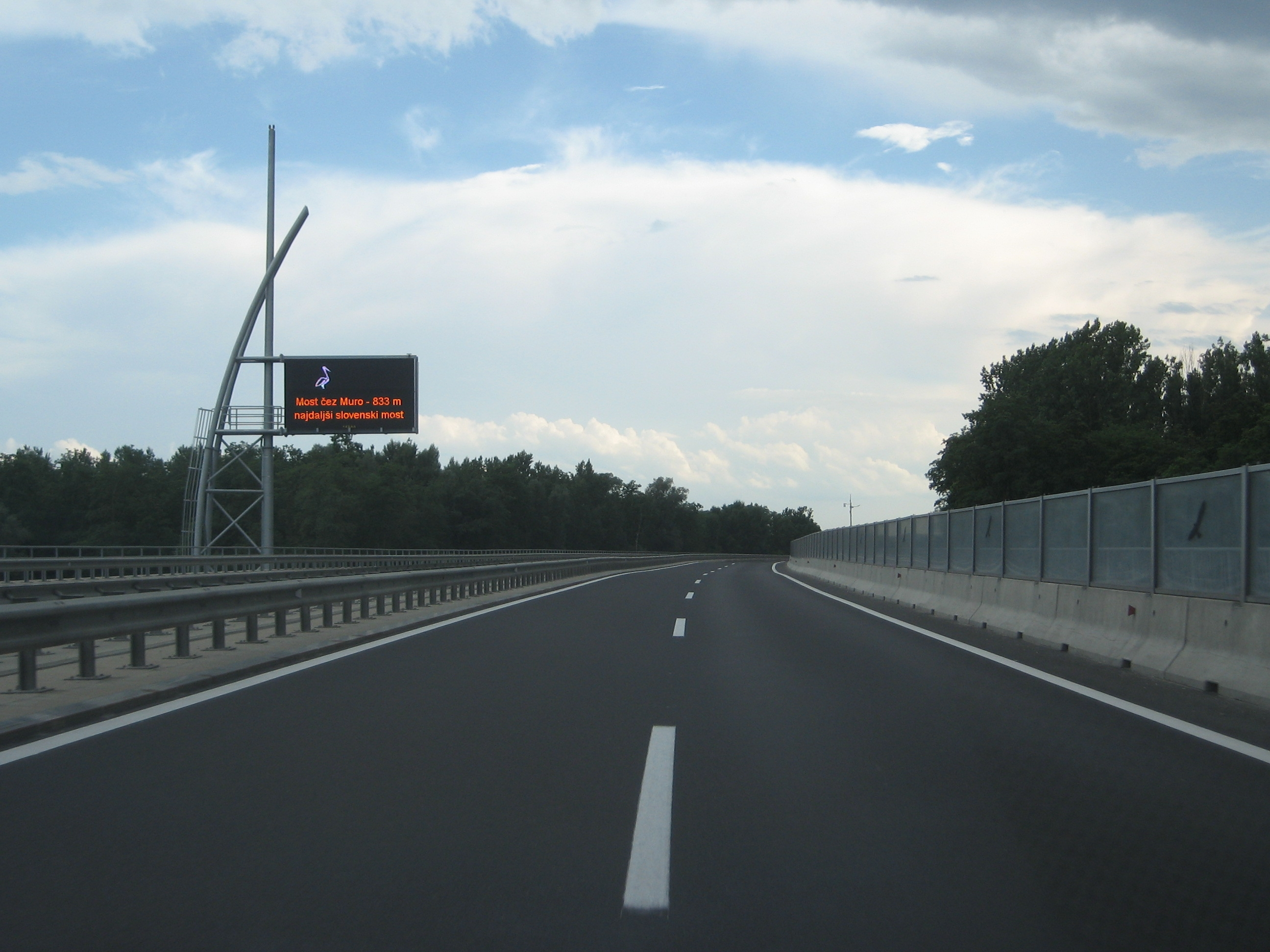
Bridge over Mura River, highway Vučja vas–Beltinci, Slovenia (2003)

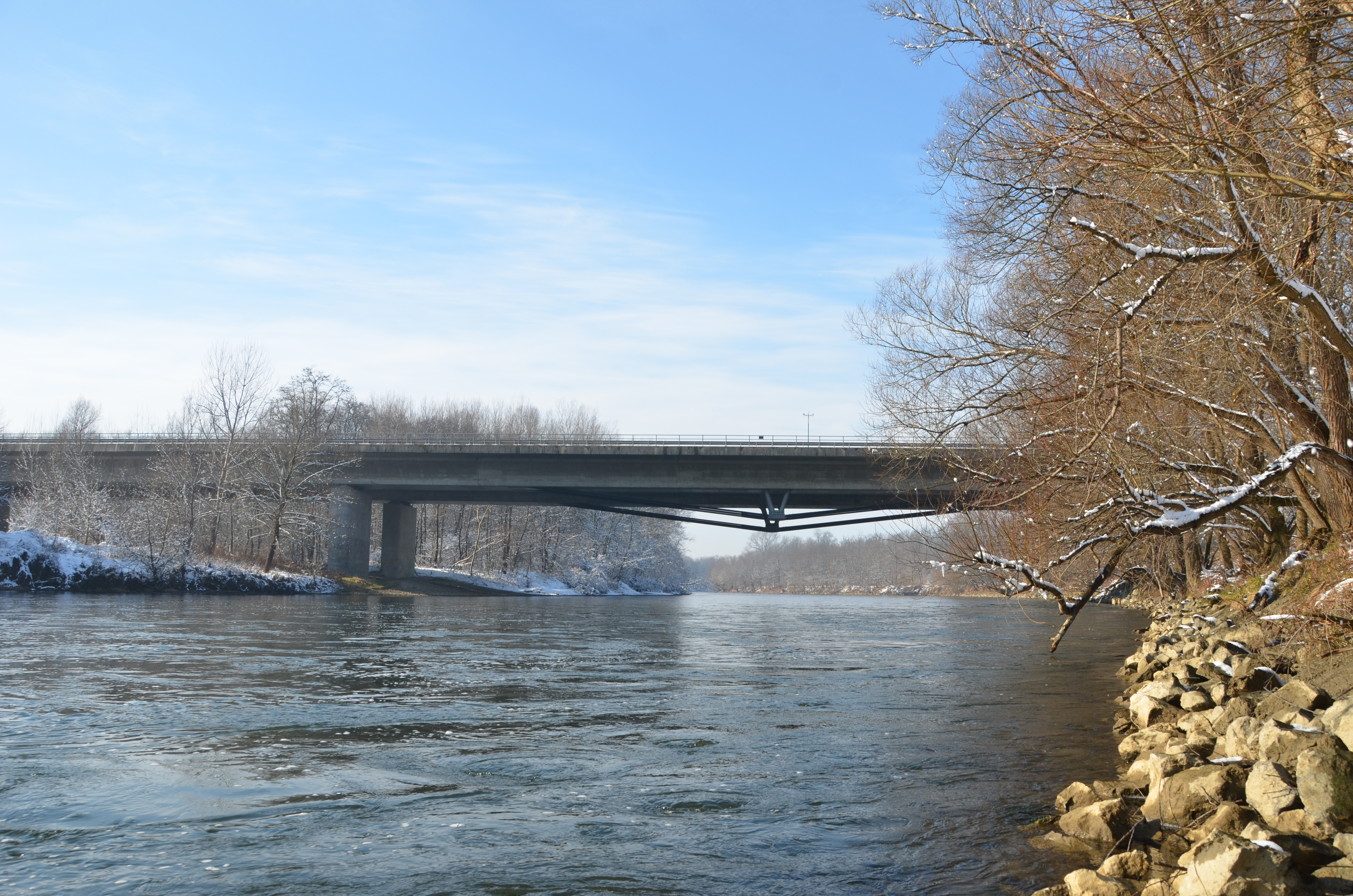
Bridge over Mura River, highway Vučja vas–Beltinci, Slovenia (2003)

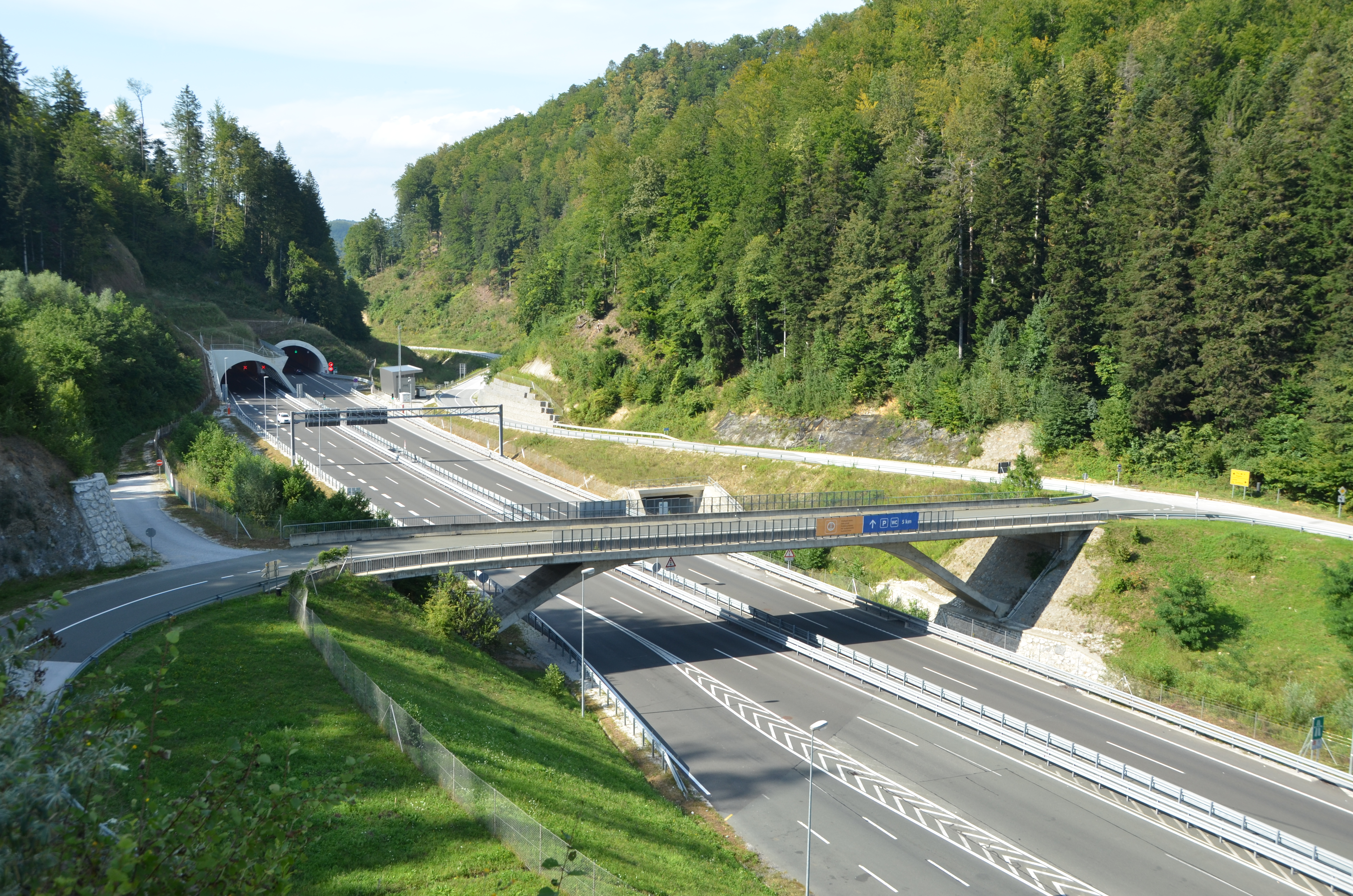
An overpass Gruškovje, Slovenia (2004)

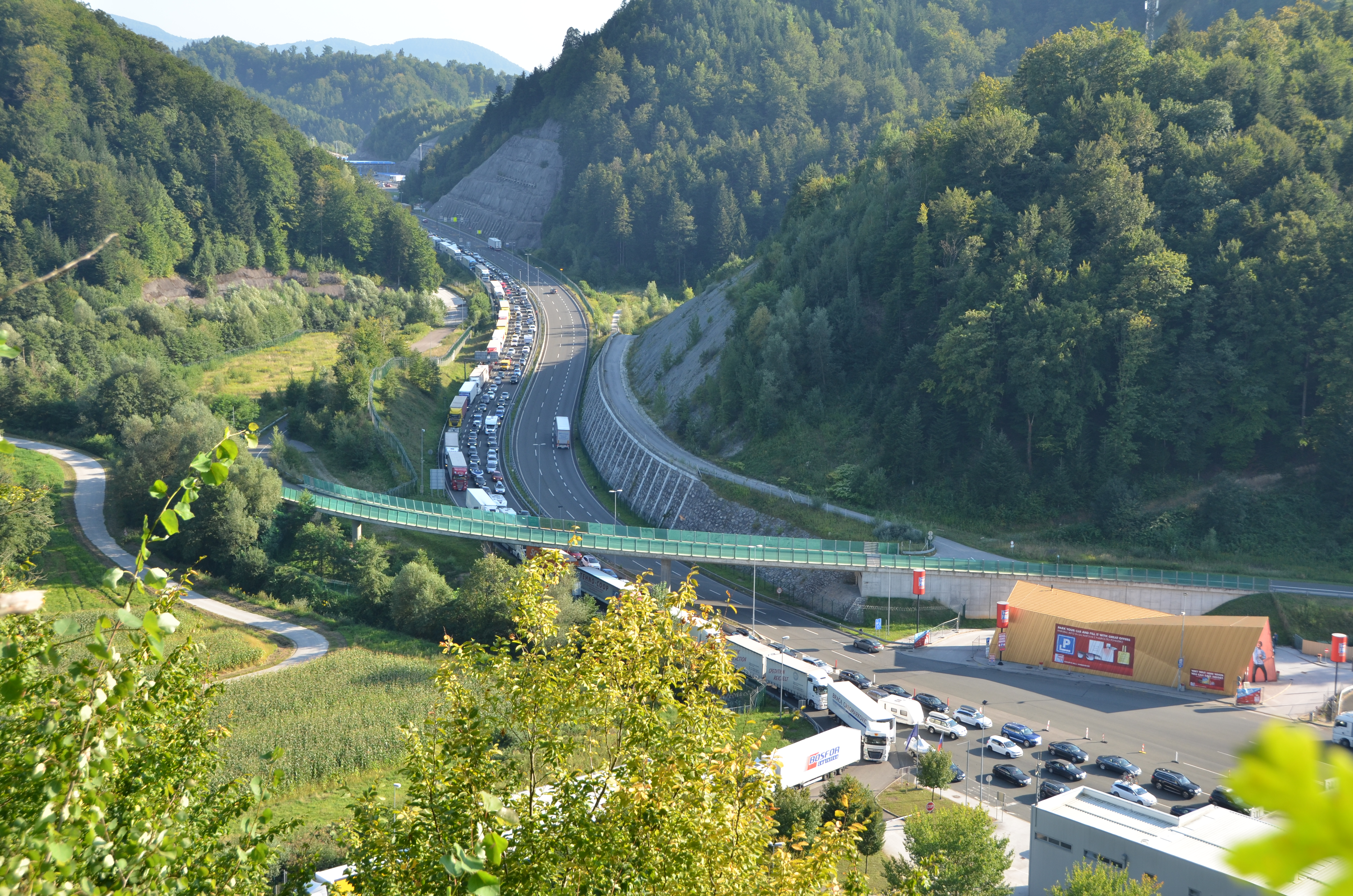
BAn overpass Gruškovje, Slovenia (2008)

Partially covered bridge over Savinja river in Laško, Slovenia (1996)

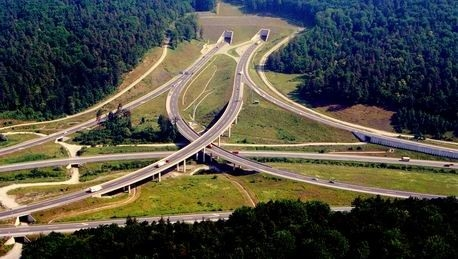
Malence Viaducts, Ljubljana, Slovenia (1998)

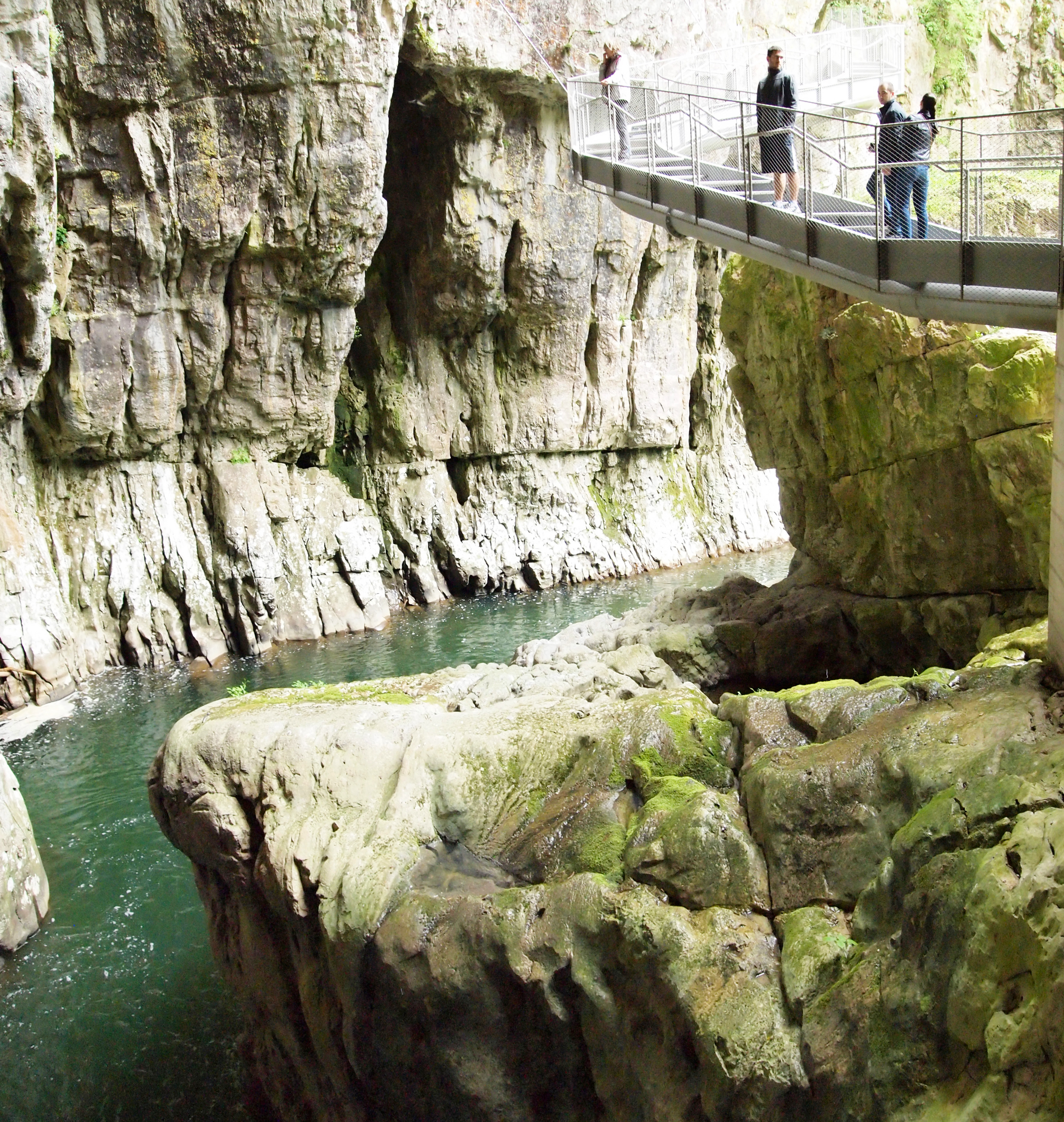
Marinič footbridge, Škocjan Caves Park, Slovenia (2010)

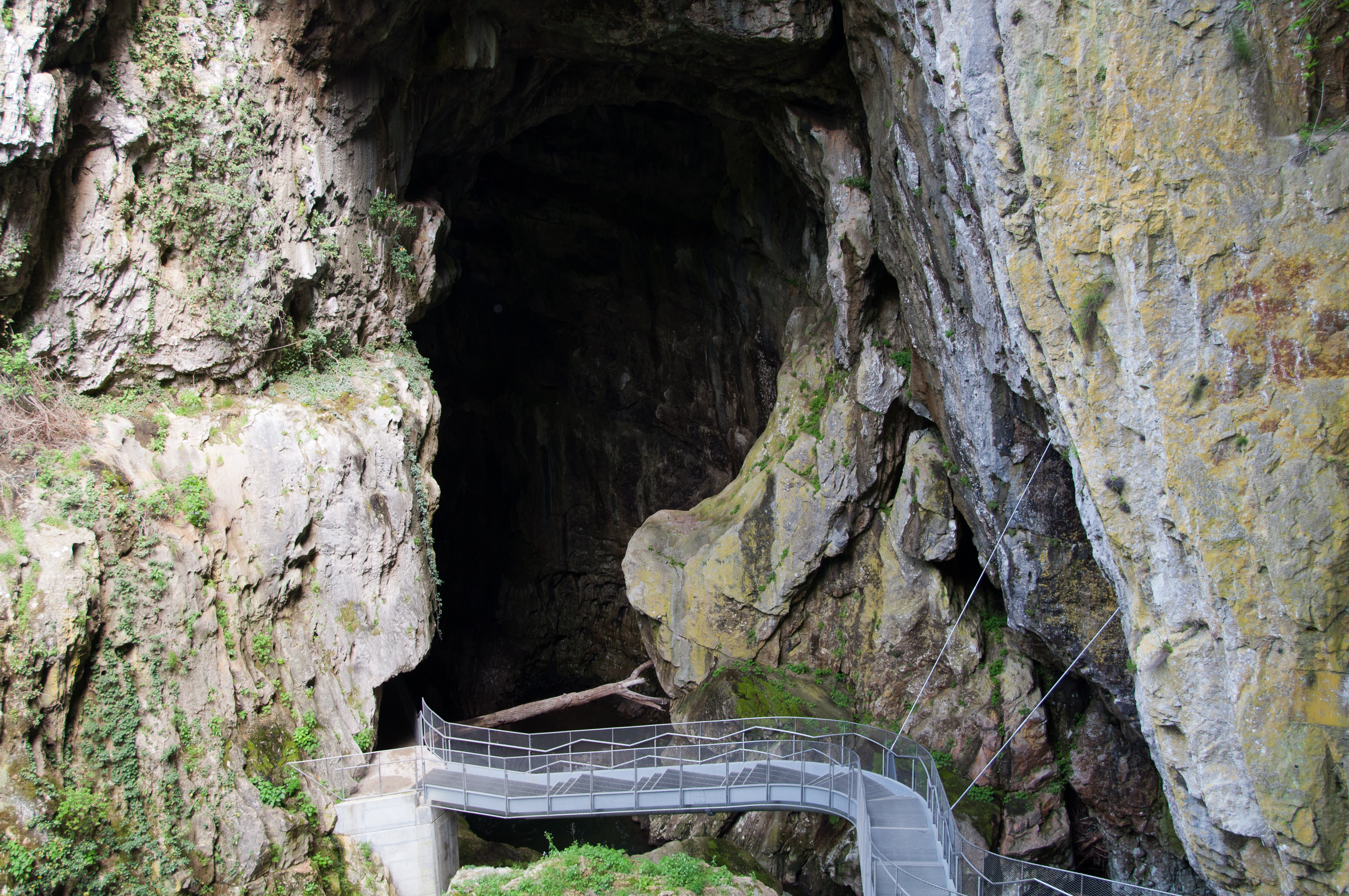
Marinič footbridge, Škocjan Caves Park, Slovenia (2010)

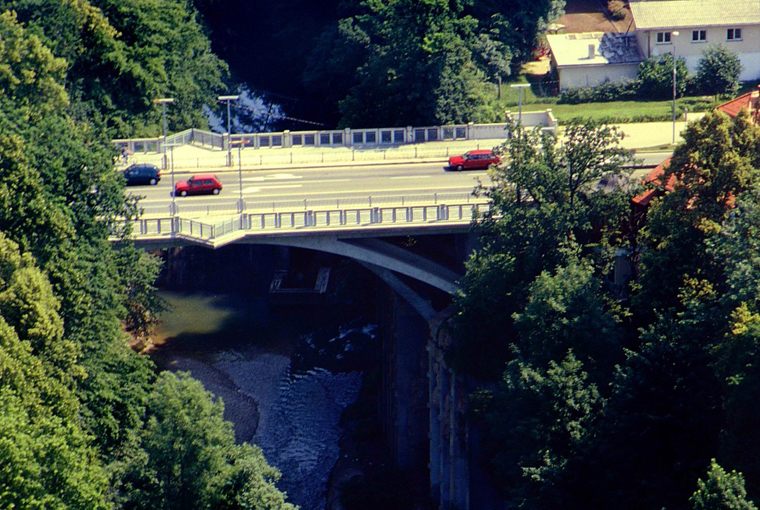
Bridge over Kokra River in Kranj (reconstruction, 1994)

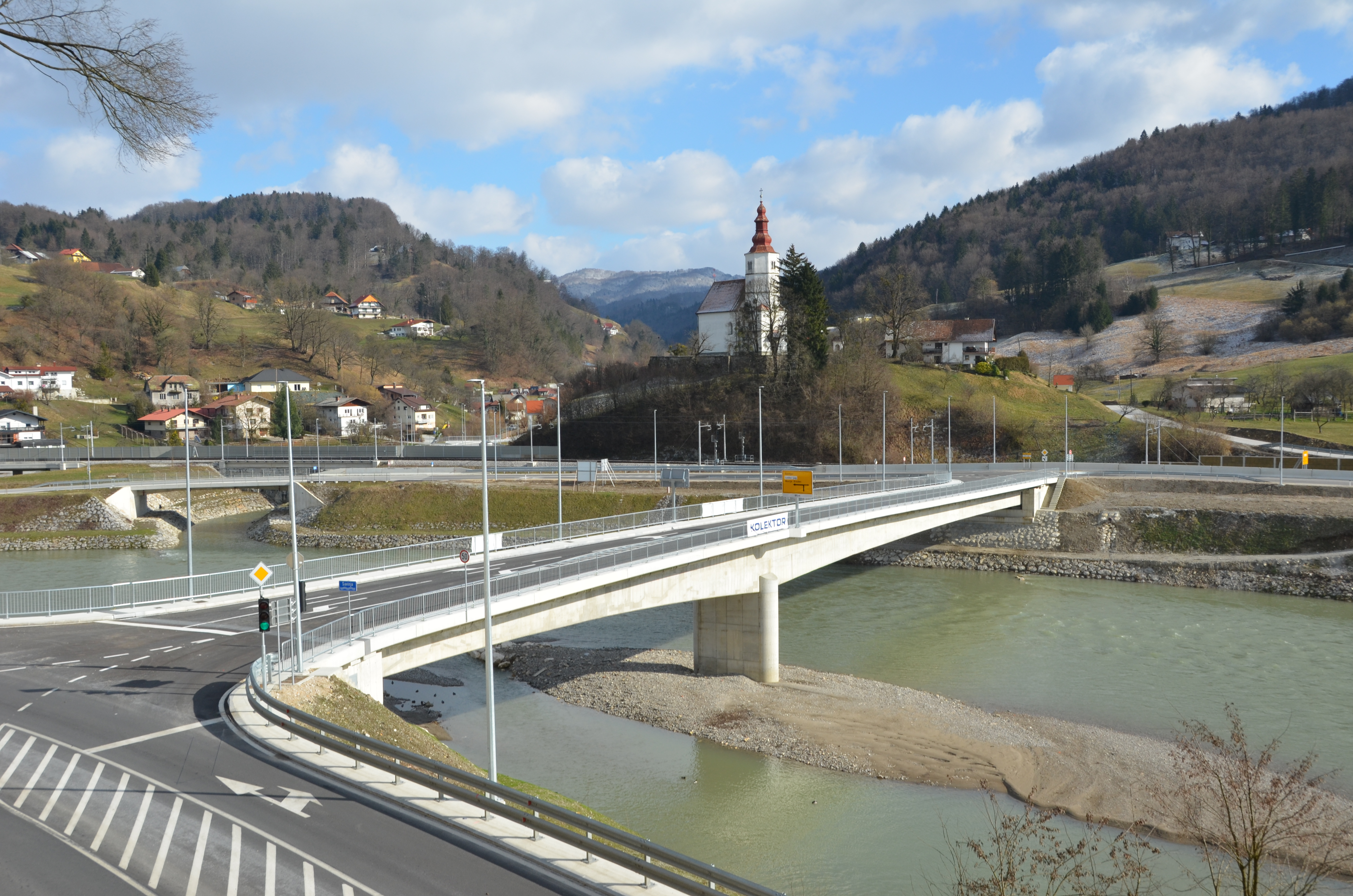
ridge over Savinja River at Marija Gradec near Laško, Slovenia (2021)

== Awards ==
- 2019 Honorary City Certificate of Slovenska Bistrica to Dr. Viktor Markelj and Marjan Pipenbaher
- 2019 Polish Minister of Investment and Development Award to Footbridge to Ołowianka Island in Gdansk
- 2018 City of Gdansk Award to Footbridge to Ołowianka Island in Gdansk
- 2015 SCE Award to Viaduct Grobelno
- 2012 WEF Award to Ada Bridge Belgrade
- 2012 CES AWARD to Ada Bridge Belgrade
- 2012 AAB Award to Ada Bridge Belgrade
- 2011 Footbridge Award to Marinic Bridge
- 2009 City seal of Maribor to Studenci Footbridge Maribor
- 2009 Award CSS of CCIS to Studenci Footbridge Maribor
- 2008 Footbridge Award to Studenci Footbridge Maribor
- 2007 SCE Award to Puch Bridge over Drava in Ptuj
- 2004 SCE Award to Bridge over Mura River
- 2004 UM Award 2004: Golden recognition award to Mr. Marjan Pipenbaher and Mr. Viktor Markelj
