= Puch Bridge =

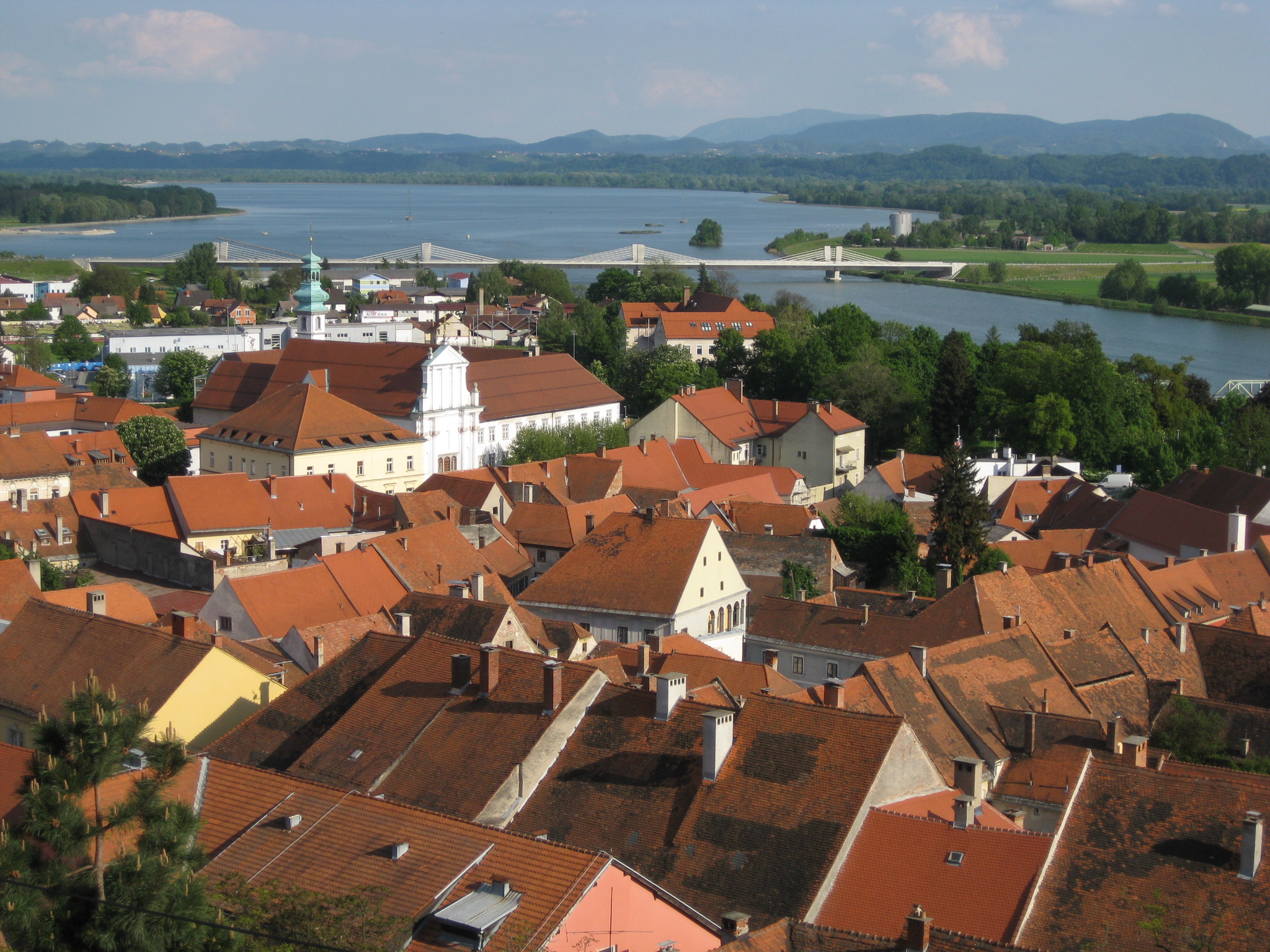
- The Puch Bridge
- Coordinates: 46°24′46″N 15°52′41″E
- Carries: 2 lanes, pedestrians and bicycles
- Crosses: Drava
- Locale: Ptuj, just above Lake Ptuj
- Official name: Bridge over the Drava River in Ptuj

Characteristics
- Design: Extradosed bridge
- Total length: 430 m (1,410 ft)
- Width: 3.25 m (10.7 ft)
- Height: 18.7 m (61 ft)
- Longest span: 65 m (213 ft), 100 m (330 ft)
- Load limit: 900 t (890 long tons; 990 short tons)

History
- Construction start: October 2005
- Construction end: May 2007
- Opened: 18 May 2007

The Puch Bridge (Slovene: Puhov most), officially the Bridge over the Drava River in Ptuj (Most čez Dravo na Ptuju), is an extradosed bridge over the Drava River near lake Ptuj in northeastern Slovenia. It is named after the inventor Johann Puch (1862–1914). It is 430 metres (1,410 ft) long and 18.7 m (61 ft) wide, and has an area of 8,097 square metres (87,160 sq ft). It was built from October 2005 until May 2007, when it was opened for traffic. Its architects were Peter Gabrijelčič and Viktor Markelj, who was also its constructor.
