= Project cycle management =

Project cycle management (PCM) is the process of planning, organizing, coordinating, and controlling a project effectively and efficiently throughout its phases, from planning through execution then completion and review to achieve pre-defined objectives or satisfying the project stakeholder by producing the right deliverable at the right time, cost and quality.

Projects go through definite and describable phases. Each phase can be brought to some sense of closure as the next phase begins. Phases can be made to result in deliverables or accomplishments to provide the starting point for the next phase. Phase transitions are ideal times to update planning baselines, to conduct high level management reviews, and to evaluate project costs and prospects.

The term project cycle management is used in EuropeAid terminology to describe decision-making procedures used during the life-cycle of a project (including key tasks, roles and responsibilities, key documents and decision options).
