= Tremerje =

- Location in Slovenia
- Coordinates: 46°11′56.9″N 15°14′4.3″E
- Country: Slovenia
- Traditional region: Styria
- Statistical region: Savinja
- Municipality: Celje

Area
  - Total: 2.74 km^{2} (1.06 sq mi)
- Elevation: 241.8 m (793 ft)

Population (2020)
  - Total: 73
  - Density: 27/km^{2} (69/sq mi)

Tremerje (pronounced [ˈtɾeːmɛɾjɛ]) is a settlement in the City Municipality of Celje in eastern Slovenia. It lies on the right bank of the Savinja River on the southwestern outskirts of Celje. The area is part of the traditional region of Styria. It is now included with the rest of the municipality in the Savinja Statistical Region.

== Church ==
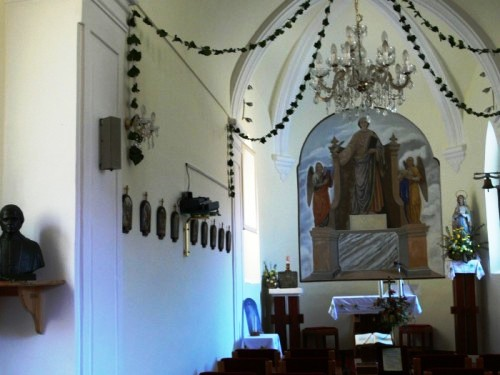
Interior of St. Luke's Church in Tremerje

The local church is dedicated to Saint Luke and belongs to the Parish of Celje Saint Cecilia. It dates to the early 19th century.

== Mass grave ==
Tremerje is the site of a mass grave associated with the Second World War. The Savinja Mass Grave (Slovene: Grobišče ob Savinji) lies along an unpaved road along the Savinja River, on an overgrown part of the riverbank near a fork in the road by an embankment. The grave contains the remains of six civilians from Celje.
