= Lidar Höyük =

Archaeological site in Turkey

- Location within Turkey
- 37°33′N 38°35′E
- Type: settlement
- Periods: Early Bronze Age to 13th century AD.
- Location: Şanlıurfa Province, Turkey

Site notes
- Excavation dates: 1979-1987
- Archaeologists: Harald Hauptmann
- Condition: Ruined
- Owner: Public
- Public access: Yes

Lidar Höyük is located near the modern village of Lidar (Dikili) in the Bozova district of Şanlıurfa Province, southeastern Turkey lying on the opposite bank of the Euphrates river from the 1.5 hectare site Gritille Höyük. It is 7 kilometers upstream from the modern city of Samsat It was occupied from the Early Bronze Age until the 13th century AD. It has now been inundated by the Atatürk Reservoir (originally the Karababa Dam) since 1988. A rescue archaeology excavation was conducted though there was not enough time and the large Early Bronze Age settlement on the mound was not excavated. The notable sites of Hassek Höyük, Nevalı Çori, and Kurban Höyük were also submerged by the dam. It has been proposed that the ancient name of the site in the early 2nd millennium BC was Ḫaḫḫum.

== Archaeology ==
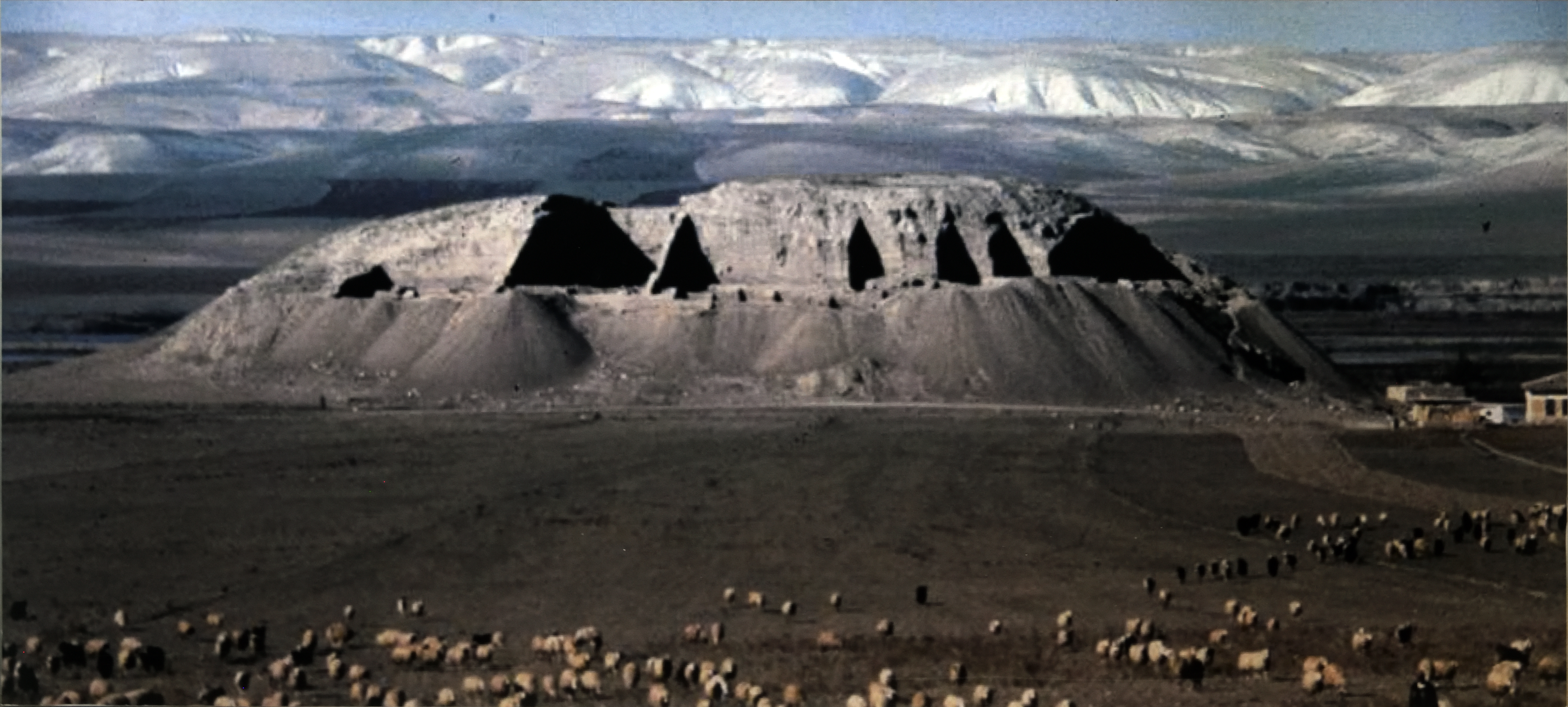
Lidar necropolis - Early Bronze Age

Three legged large bowl from Lidar Höyük - terracotta - Early Bronze Age

Gazelle from Lidar Höyük - Smectite - Early Bronze Age

The site has a 120 meter by 150 meter 35 meter high main mound (acropolis) and lower town with the nearby Early Bronze Age necropolis. The entire site extends to 200 meters by 240 meters and occupational remains on the main mound have a depth of 25 meters. It was excavated between 1979 and 1987 by the Institute of Prehistory, Early History, and Near Eastern Archaeology of the Ruprecht-Karls-Universität Heidelberg (Heidelberg University) team led by Harald Hauptmann until it was submerged by the Atatürk Reservoir. Excavation was limited by the impending inundation so only parts of the site were investigated. In the first several seasons work mainly focused on the surface Medieval period remains (Stratum 1) including the fortress wall. Those remains had 4 phases covering about 100 years from the mid-13th century back to the first half of the 12th century and encompassed about 2.2 meters in depth. A number of coins were found. On the main mound a step trench was excavated on the north slope revealing large occupational levels from the Early Bronze II period (14 architectural strata) until the Middle Bronze II period (5 architectural strata). The step trench extended over 30 meters and had 5 steps. On the acropolis a Late Bronze Age building was also excavated. In the remaining years the excavation focus was on the Middle Bronze Age remains and the small Late Bronze Age area.

The MB II occupation was destroyed in a significant conflagration and the re-occupied on a much lesser scale in the Late Bronze I-II period (4 architectural strata). In the debris of the MBA destruction were found human skeletons in distorted positions in the entrances to several buildings as well bronze arrowheads including one stuck in a wall.This was again destroyed by fire sometime before the 12th century BC based on glyphic evidence. Based on dendrochronology the destruction is dated to after 1140 ± 37 BC. A number of radiocarbon dates were obtained for the Bronze Age layers. In the Islamic level a 20 meter by 18 meter rectilinear building was excavated.

Nineteen pottery kilns were found in the Early Bronze Age "potters quarter" on the western terrace. There were two types of kilns, simple, horseshoe-shaped and those where the combustion and firing chambers are separate. The later had a circular ground plan with a firing chamber divided into two compartments and elongated antechambers annexed to the door of the combustion chamber. Much of the pottery found at the site contained pre-firing potmarks.

Among 205 graves a number of Early Dynastic III period limestone-built chamber tombs were excavated at Lidar Höyük. One, Tomb #6, contained almost two hundred pots including cream colored bowls, cups, bottles, spiral burnished metallic wares, 12 bronze pins, and numerous Early Dynastic III type beads and Tomb #5 also contained a large number of pots. Three amber beads were found in Grave 166. All burials were head to the north-west and the feet to the south. The larger tombs had a cluster of smaller cist tombs surrounding them. Tombs contained single and/or multiple depositions of articulated skeletons. Besides pottery they contained jewelry, bronze pins, and a few violin shaped stone figurines. A few Iron Age burials were found with grave goods including a crystal stamp seal and a scarab. Two Early Dynastic IV tombs contained multiple burials as was the custom in that period.

At least two bronze Iron Age fibula were found. In the Achaemenid layer a grave chamber was uncovered constructed of mudbricks with a stone slab cover. It contained a bronze coffin with 4 bronze handles containing the skeleton of a 48-year-old man. Grace goods included a gold seal ring.

A few Old Babylonian period cuneiform tablet fragments were found at the site. In the 1985 season two sealings of Kuzi-Tešup, ruler of Carchemish and the great-great-great-grandson of Hittite ruler Šuppiluliuma I (c. 1350–1322 BC) was also found. In the same Late Bronze Age building, destroyed by the fire that ended the layer, numerous ibex horns were found, as well as the charred remains of an elm wood wheel. The wheel was six-spoked, with a diameter of 0.86 meters and constructed in the style typical of the 18th Dynasty of Egypt chariots.

== History ==
Pottery finds indicated the site was occupied as far back as the Late Chalcolithic period. Because the site was facing inundation and earlier occupation levels were beneath the large Early Bronze Age remains nothing is known about that period at the site. Based on archaeology Lidar Höyük was occupied from the Early Bronze Age until the 13th century AD. The site lay at the northernmost ford on the Euphrates river in the area where it neared the Taurus mountains. Cargo would be brought up the river by boats and at Lidar Höyük the cargo would undergo "break-of-bulk" repacking for land shipment.

The excavators defined a number of occupational strata:

- Strata 1–2: Medieval / Islamic Period
- Strata 3–4: Hellenistic & Roman / Persian Periods
- Stratum 5: Iron Age / Achaemenid, 8 architectural layers
- Stratum 6: Late Bronze Age, 2 architectural layers, destroyed in conflagration c. 1100s BC
- Strata 7–8: Middle Bronze Age, 5 architectural layers, destroyed in conflagration c. 1600s BC
- Strata 9: Early Bronze Period, 14 architectural layers

== Gallery ==
Deer legged bowl from Lidar Höyük - Early Bronze Age

Pithos - terracotta from Lidar Höyük - Early Bronze Age

Three legged bowl from Lidar Höyük - terracotta - Early Bronze Age

Large bowl with base from Lidar Höyük - terracotta - Early Bronze Age

Urfa museum Fish shaped vessel from Lidar Höyük - terracotta - Early Bronze Age

== See also ==
- Cities of the ancient Near East
- List of Mesopotamian deities
- List of Mesopotamian dynasties
