= Constantine of Gargar =

12th century Armenian noble

- Reign: c. 1087–1117
- Successor: Michael of Gargar
- Died: 1117; Samosata
- Issue: Michael of Gargar
- Religion: Armenian Apostolic Church

Constantine of Gargar was an Armenian chieftain who ruled the region around Gargar (modern Gerger) in the late eleventh and early twelfth century.

== Biography ==
=== Origins ===
Constantine appears as one of the Armenian leaders who took control of parts of the realm of Philaretos Brachamios after his death. It seems that Constantine had one brother called Dawt'ouk (mentioned in the chronicles as Taphnuz, Taftoc or Tabtoug).

=== Interaction with the Franks ===
In February 1098, Constantine accompanied Baldwin of Boulogne, who had recently arrived in Edessa to protect the townspeople, on a campaign against Balduk of Samosata. He next appears as one of the conspirators who brought down Thoros and according to Albert of Aachen he was the one who suggested to put Baldwin in Thoros' place. After the coup, Constantine was closely associated with Baldwin and Gérard Dédéyan suggested that it was the daughter of his brother Dawt'ouk, Arda, that Baldwin married at some point after that.

=== Final years ===
After a ploy of Vasil Dgha, ruler of Kaysun and Raban, to ally with the Turks had failed, the new count of Edessa, Baldwin II decided to suppress the remaining Armenian principalities in the Euphrates Valley. Constantine was deposed around 1117 and was imprisoned in Samosata where he died soon after during an earthquake. His son Michael reigned in Gargar until 1122 when the city passed into Frankish hands when he was not longer able to protect it against the Turks.

== Sources ==
- Andrews, Tara L. (28 November 2016). Mattʿēos Uṙhayecʿi and His Chronicle History as Apocalypse in a Crossroads of Cultures. Brill. ISBN 9789004330351.
- Beihammer, Alexander Daniel (17 February 2017). Byzantium and the Emergence of Muslim-Turkish Anatolia, Ca. 1040-1130. Taylor & Francis. ISBN 9781351983860.
- Edgington, Susan (15 January 2019). Baldwin I of Jerusalem, 1100-1118. Taylor & Francis. ISBN 9781317176404.
- MacEvitt, Christopher (24 November 2010). The Crusades and the Christian World of the East: Rough Tolerance. University of Pennsylvania Press. ISBN 978-0-8122-0269-4.
- Runciman, Steven (1989). A History of the Crusades, Volume II: The Kingdom of Jerusalem and the Frankish East, 1100-1187. Cambridge University Press. ISBN 0-521-06162-8.
