= Samsat District =

- District
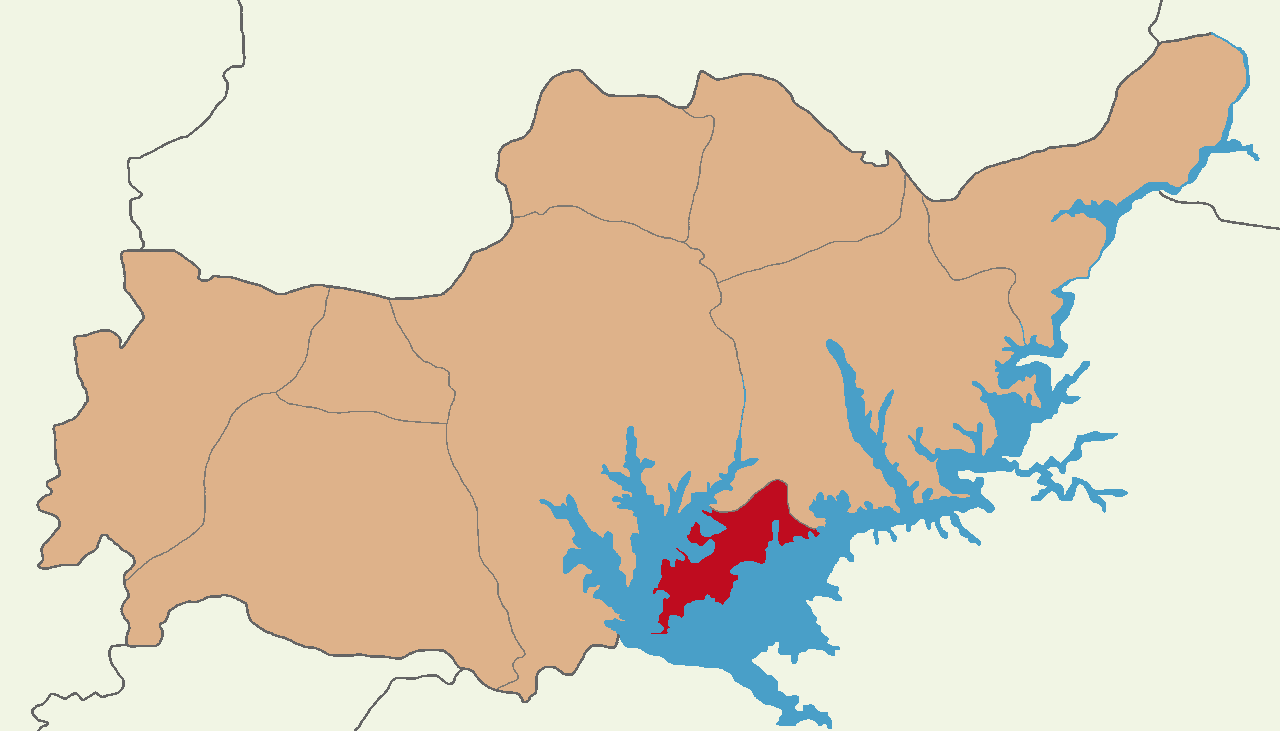
- Map showing Samsat District in Adıyaman Province

- Location in Turkey
- Coordinates: 37°35′N 38°29′E
- Country: Turkey
- Province: Adıyaman
- Seat: Samsat

Government
  - Kaymakam: Halid Yıldız
- Area: 319 km^{2} (123 sq mi)
- Population (2021): 7,313
  - Density: 23/km^{2} (59/sq mi)
- Time zone: UTC+3 (TRT)
- Website: www.samsat.gov.tr

Samsat District is a district of Adıyaman Province of Turkey. Its seat is the town Samsat. Its area is 319 km^{2}, and its population is 7,313 (2021). The district was established in 1960.

A survey from 2006 estimated that Kurds constituted 96% of the population of the district.

== Geography ==
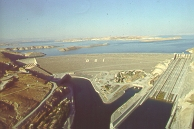
Samsat district peninsula in the distance.

The new Samsat district is a peninsula surrounded on the three sides by the Atatürk Reservoir. The distance from the sea to the city centre is 470 km. The district is a plain that descends to the south.

In the hot summers and dry winters, while the Mediterranean climate is warm and rainy, it is similar to the South East Anatolian climate due to the low relative humidity. However, due to the influence of the Atatürk Reservoir in recent years, humidity has increased relatively.

=== Composition ===
There is 1 municipality in Samsat District:

- Samsat (Samîsad)

There are 16 villages in Samsat District:

- Akdamar (Mermere)
- Bağarası (Babilge)
- Bayırlı
- Çiçek
- Doğanca (Merazî)
- Gölpınar
- Göltarla
- Kırmacık (Hayik)
- Kızılöz (Bircik)
- Kovanoluk (Birîman)
- Kuştepe (Berfirat)
- Ovacık
- Taşkuyu (Birik)
- Tepeönü (Gevrik)
- Uzuntepe (Selik)
- Yarımbağ (Xornif)
