= Taşkuyu =

Taşkuyu (literally "stone well" in Turkish) may refer to:

- Taşkuyu, Samsat, a village in Samsat district of Adıyaman Province, Turkey
- Taşkuyu, Tarsus, a village in Tarsus district of Mersin Province, Turkey
