= Imports to Ur =

Trade connections of the Sumerian city of Ur

Imports to Ur reflect the cultural and trade connections of the Sumerian city of Ur. During the period of the Early Dynastic III royal cemetery (ca. 2600 BC), Ur was importing elite goods from geographically distant places. These objects include precious metals such as gold and silver, and semi-precious stones, namely lapis lazuli and carnelian. These objects are all the more impressive considering the distance from which they traveled to reach Mesopotamia and Ur specifically.

Mesopotamia is very well suited to agricultural production for both plants and animals but is lacking in metals, minerals and stones. These materials were traded by both land and water, although bulk transportation is only possible by water as it is cheaper and faster. River transportation greatly aided Mesopotamian crafts from very early in the fourth millennium. The Euphrates provided access to Syria and Anatolia as well as the Gulf, and many trading posts were set up along the river. The Tigris, in general, is less hospitable to travel and was therefore used less than the Euphrates for trade. Pack-animals such as donkeys and mules were used for overland trade. The combination of these means of transportation allowed access to distant areas and a vast trading network.

== Gold ==
Most of the gold known from archaeological contexts in ancient Mesopotamia is concentrated at the royal cemetery at Ur (and later in the Neo-Assyrian graves at Nimrod). Textual evidence indicates that gold was reserved for prestige and religious functions. It was gathered in royal treasuries, temples and used for adornment of elite peoples as well as funerary offerings (such as the graves at Ur). Gold is used for personal ornaments, weapons and tools, sheet-metal cylinder seals, vessels such as fluted bowls, goblets and imitation cockle shells, and as additions to sculpture.

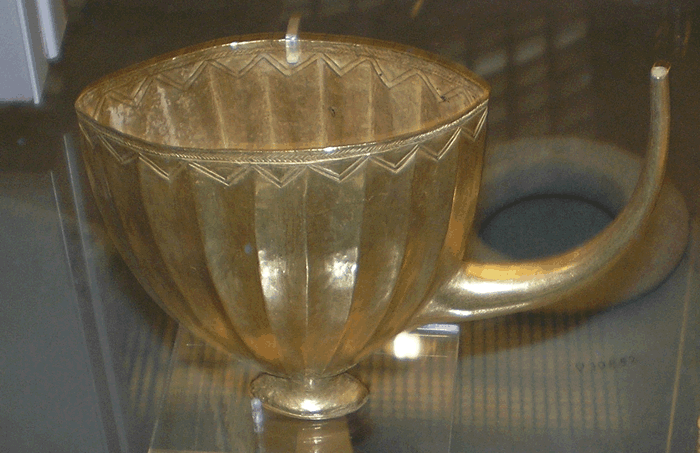
Gold Cup. Mesopotamian artwork, ca. 2600-2400 BC. From the “Queen's tomb” (that of Puabi) in the Royal Cemetery at Ur, Southern Iraq.

The textual evidence for the sources of gold used in Mesopotamia is irregular. The Sumerian texts name Aratta as a source while the Gudea records mention both the mountain of Ḫaḫḫum, near Samsat in modern Turkey, and Meluḫḫa. Other texts refer to a perhaps mythical place known as (Ḫ)arallu, supposedly located in the hinterland of Iran, as a source of gold. Other possible sources are named by Shu-Sin, such as 'Su-land', most likely in western Iran, and (Mar)daman in south-eastern Turkey. Texts referring to Dilmun mention that gold is traveling to Ur up the Gulf, perhaps originating in Meluḫḫa.

== Silver ==
The Akkadian word for silver also means money, as it was used for uncoined currency. It was also used for objects, which is how one finds most of the silver in the royal cemetery at Ur. These objects include belts, vessels, jewelry such as hair ornaments and pins, fittings for weapons, imitation cockle shells used for cosmetics, and parts of sculpture.

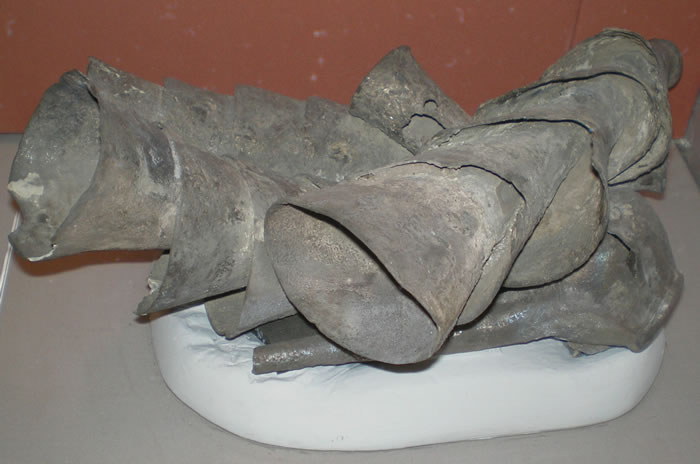
Silver vessels found in the tomb of queen Puabi in Ur

There are very few literary references to sources for silver. It is also difficult to identify the actual origin of the silver and the mines from those areas in which the majority of trade occurred. Because silver was used as currency it is even more difficult to pinpoint an area of origination due to its vast circulation. The 'Silver Mountains' mentioned in association with the campaigns of Sargon of Akkad are identified as the mines found at Keban on the Upper Euphrates. Other, more generic, silver-producing areas are Aratta, Dilmun, Elam, Marḫashi (also known as Barhashi or Parahshum) and Meluḫḫa. Some known areas in Iran containing argentiferous lead that could have been exploited at this time are Azerbaijan, Kerman, and the Miyana-Zanjan region. Anatolia, especially the mining region of Bolkardag in the Taurus Mountains, is also well known for silver-bearing ore deposits and probably supplied most of the silver to Mesopotamia at this time.

== Lapis Lazuli ==
Lapis Lazuli is the best known and well-documented gemstone at Ur and in Mesopotamia in general. In the royal cemetery lapis lazuli is found as jewelry, plaques and amulets, and as inlays in gaming boards, musical instruments, and ostrich-egg vessels as well as parts of larger sculptural groups such as the "Ram in a Thicket" and as the beard of a bull attached to a lyre. Some of the larger objects include a spouted cup, a dagger-hilt, and a whetstone. Because of its prestige and value it played a special role in cult practices and the term “lapis-like” is a commonly occurring metaphor for unusual wealth and it regularly an attribute of gods and heroes. It is commonly found associated with gold.

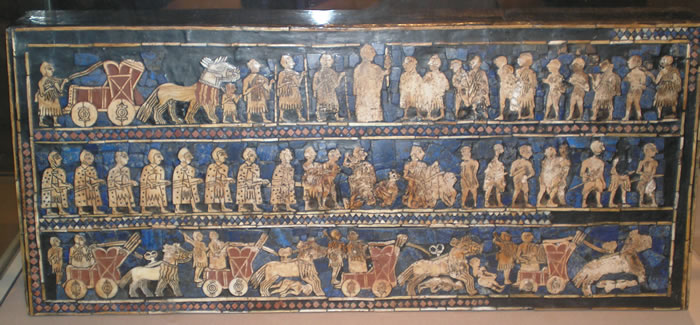
The Standard of Ur. Frame: wood; mosaic: shell, red limestone, lapis lazuli and bitumen, Sumerian artwork, ca. 2600-2400 BC. From tomb 779 Ur.

This opaque semi-precious stone has restricted geological origins. There is no textual evidence which provides a clear reference to the source of Sumerian lapis lazuli although documents list Aratta, Dilmun, and Meluḫḫa in Iran. These also name mountains such as Mt. Dapara, Mt. Bikni (modern Kuh-i Alvand in western Iran) and Bahtar Mountain or Sogdia. It is almost universally acknowledged that the lapis lazuli from Mesopotamia originated in the upper reaches of the Kokcha River in the Badakhshan district of modern Afghanistan. This was certainly exploited at the time of the Royal Cemetery (ca. 2600 BC) with evidence of manufacture in the 3rd millennium at Shortugai (I) on the Oxus River. This area is around 1500 miles from Mesopotamia and is extremely inhospitable. The mines are located 330 meters up the mountain slope and mining can only be conducted three months of the year because of the harsh winters. Other possible sources include Azerbaijan and Kerman. The stone was possibly first taken to Meluḫḫa and then traded (along with carnelian) by ship up the Gulf. There is no textual reference to a land route but several probably existed through the Zagros Mountains.

== Carnelian ==
Carnelian is a variety of microcrystalline quartz that is particularly suited for fine beads and seals. This semi-precious stone is second only to lapis lazuli in terms of popularity in Mesopotamia and Ur specifically. Carnelian was most likely imported as both a raw material and as manufactured beads.

Because quartz occurs widely and in igneous, metamorphic and sedimentary rock formations the exact areas or origination are difficult. It occurs in alluvial pebbles in the central plateau of Iran and in the Elburz Mountains in northern Iran. Also found in large blocks on the Gulf at Bushire. Charles Leonard Woolley, the excavator at Ur, attributes the carnelian found there to the Gulf area. The Indus Valley, however, has famously been exploited for its carnelian and it is likely that some of the material originated here as well. Carnelian is also mentioned in many Sumerian texts including those to do with trade with Dilmun. In the Gudea inscriptions carnelian is reportedly from Meluḫḫa.

== Chlorite ==
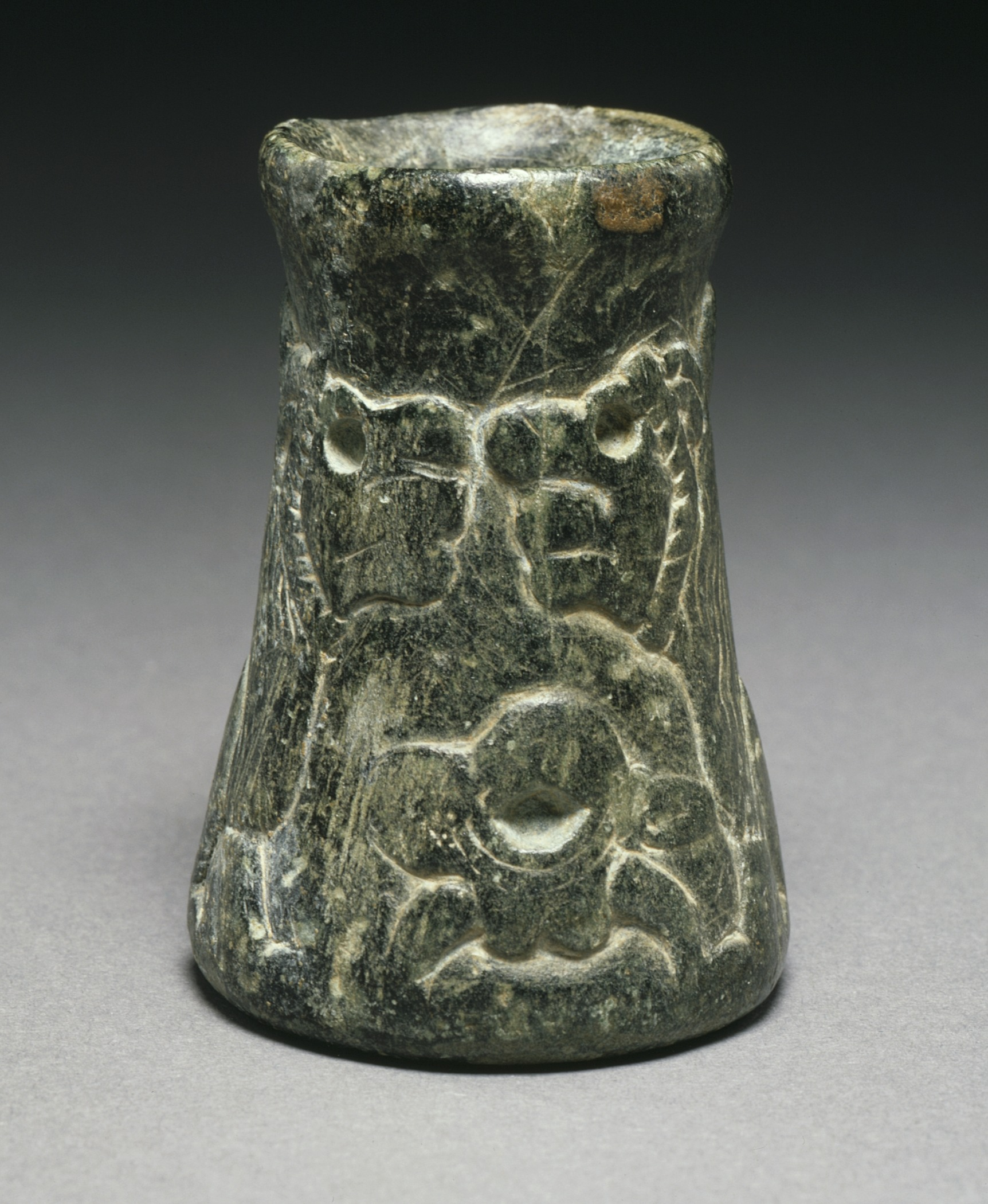
Carved chlorite vessel with opposing animals. Northern Afghanistan, c. 2700-2500 BC; Height: 6.5 cm. LACMA

In the 3rd millennium BCE, chlorite stone artifacts were very popular, and traded widely. These included disc beads and ornaments, as well as stone vases. These carved dark stone vessels have been found everywhere in ancient Mesopotamia. They rarely exceed 25 cm in height, and may have been filled with precious oils. They often carry human and animal motifs inlaid with semi-precious stones.

"Elaborate stone vessels carved with repeating designs, both geometric and naturalistic, in an easily recognizable “intercultural style”, were made primarily of chlorite; a number were produced at the important site of Tepe Yahya southeast of Kerman (Iran) in the middle and late 3rd millennium b.c.e. Some of these vessels were painted natural color (dark green) and inlaid with pastes and shell, and some have even been found with cuneiform inscriptions referring to rulers and known Sumerian deities. More than 500 vessels and vessel fragments carved in this style have been recovered from sites ranging from Uzbekistan and the Indus Valley (e.g., Mohenjo-daro) in the east to Susa and all the major Sumerian sites in Mesopotamia, including Mari, in the west and to the Persian Gulf, particularly Tarut and the Failaka Islands, in the south."
