= Hassek Höyük =

Archaeological site in Turkey

- Location within Turkey
- 38°55′22″N 37°44′54″E
- Type: Settlement
- Periods: Late Chalcolithic, Early Bronze I
- Location: Şanlıurfa Province, Turkey

History
- Built: 4th millennium BC

Site notes
- Excavation dates: 1978-1986
- Archaeologists: M.R. Behm-Blancke, B. Hrouda
- Condition: Ruined
- Owner: Public
- Public access: Yes

Hassek Höyük (also Hassek Hüyük) is an ancient Near East archaeological site, located on the left bank of the Euphrates River in the Şanlıurfa Province of southeastern Turkey. It was excavated in a salvage effect due to flooding caused by the Atatürk Dam (originally the Karababa Dam). Hassek Höyük lies 20 kilometers south of the castle of Gerger, site of the Battle of Gerger. It is halfway between the villages Asagi Tillakin and Yukari Tillakin. A Halaf period archaeological site, Cavi Tarlasi, is 4.5 kilometers to the west. For this period the area is considered to be part of Upper Mesopotamia. The site is now completely underwater. The notable archaeological sites of Lidar Höyük and Kurban Höyük were also inundated at that time.

== Archaeology ==
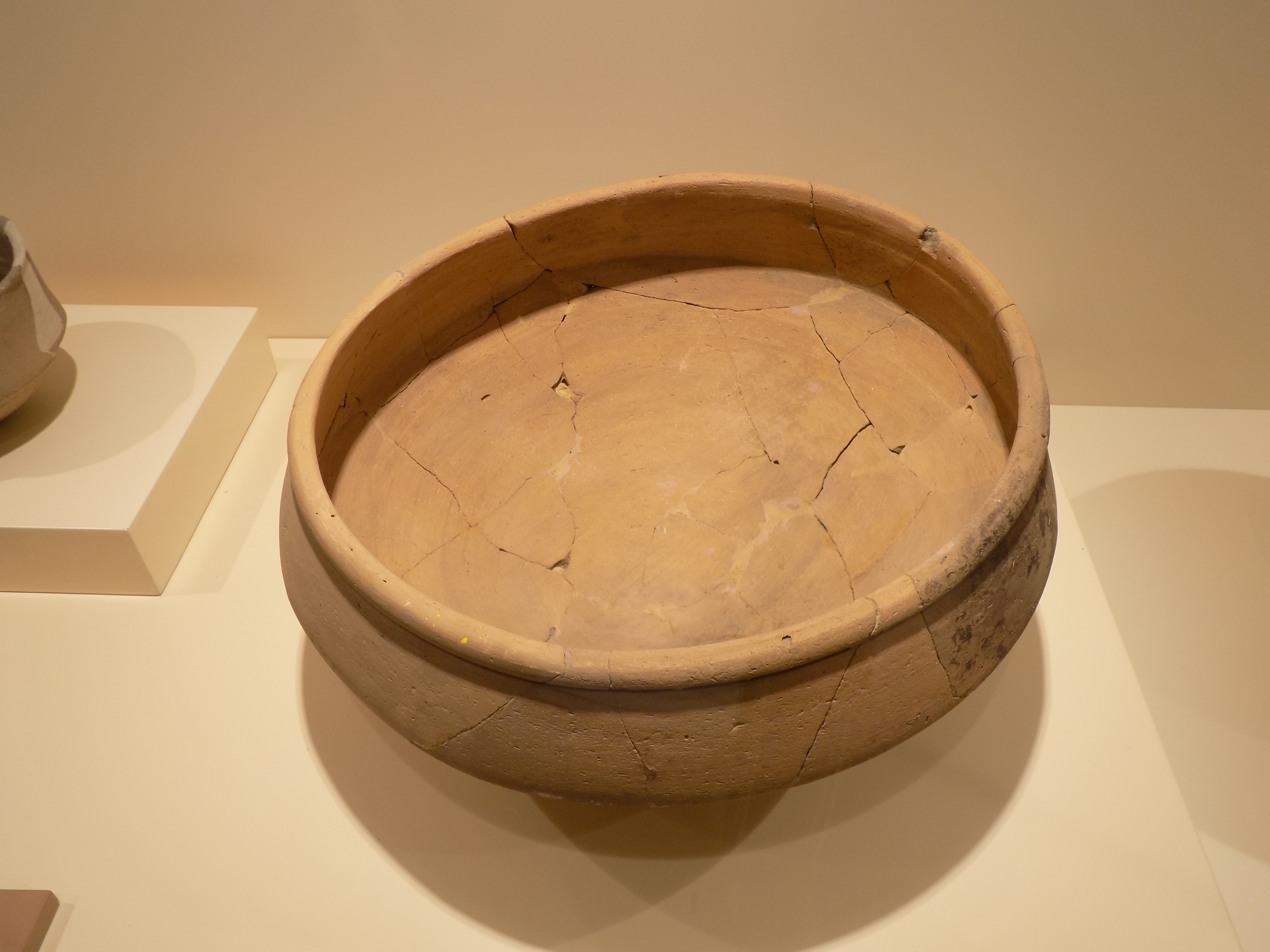
Late Chalcolithic bowl from Hassek Höyük

Hassek Höyük is a roughly 140 meter by 110 meter flat mound which rises about 9 meters above the plain. It is situated of a slope besides a loop in the Euphrates river and next to a ford in that river. It is thought to have covered an area of about 5.25 hectares before being partially eroded by the Euphrates. Part of the Uruk period occupation on the mound was lost in a landslide at some point.

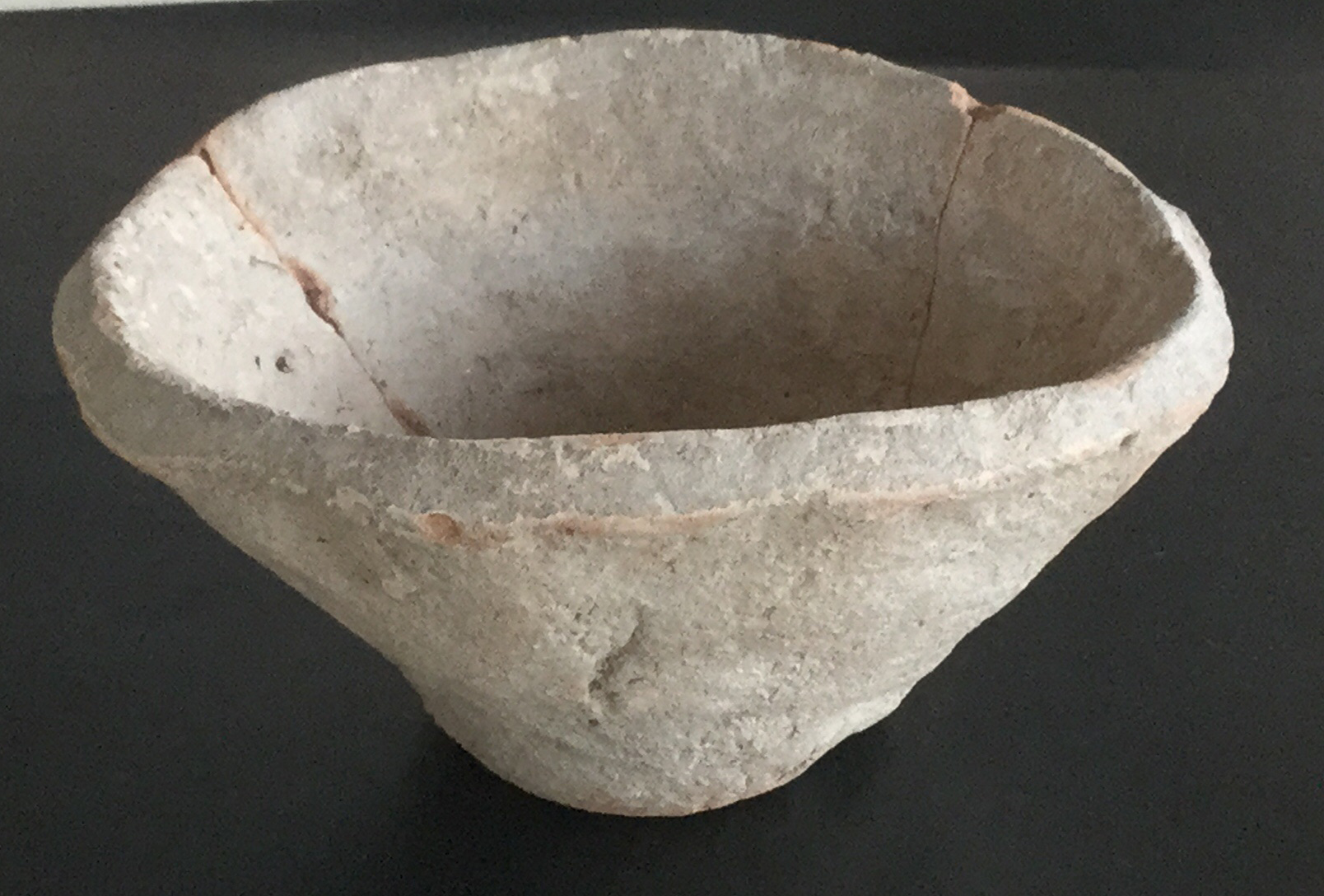
Uruk-period beveled rim bowl, c. 3400–3200 BCE, from Habuba Kabira South in Syria

The site was excavated from 1978 until 1986 by a German Archaeological Institute, Istanbul and Institute for Near Eastern Archaeology of the LMU Munich team led by M.R. Behm-Blancke and B. Hrouda as part of the Lower Euphrates Salvage Project. Work was initiated due to flooding caused by the construction of the Atatürk Dam. Work in 1978 and 1979 began with a 8000 square meter geo-magnetic survey (1 meter intervals) and test sounding to determine soil conditions and depth of settlement remains as well as a surface survey. A Uruk period roughly oval fortified acropolis was found at the top of the mound which enclosed a number of buildings. These included a large Northern Building and a large (31 meters by 23 meters) Southern Building which the excavators interpreted as a tripartite temple (similar to a building found at Habuba Kabira. The later building was constructed on 1.2 meter deep by 2 meter wide rubble foundations topped by mudbrick walls and contained a 3.5 meter by at least 8 meter room which was sunk 2 meters below the floor level. The Southern building was surrounded by residential structures, work areas, and grain storage facilities. The entire acropolis area is surrounded by a wall built on pebble and stone foundations and with a 12-meter wide buttressed casemate construction gateway in the northwest portion. Four radiocarbon samples (calibration OxCal v3.10) from the Early Bronze I phases covered 3330-2947 BC. Glyphic finds included a number of Early Bronze 1 cylinder seals and stamp seals and clay sealings from all phases.

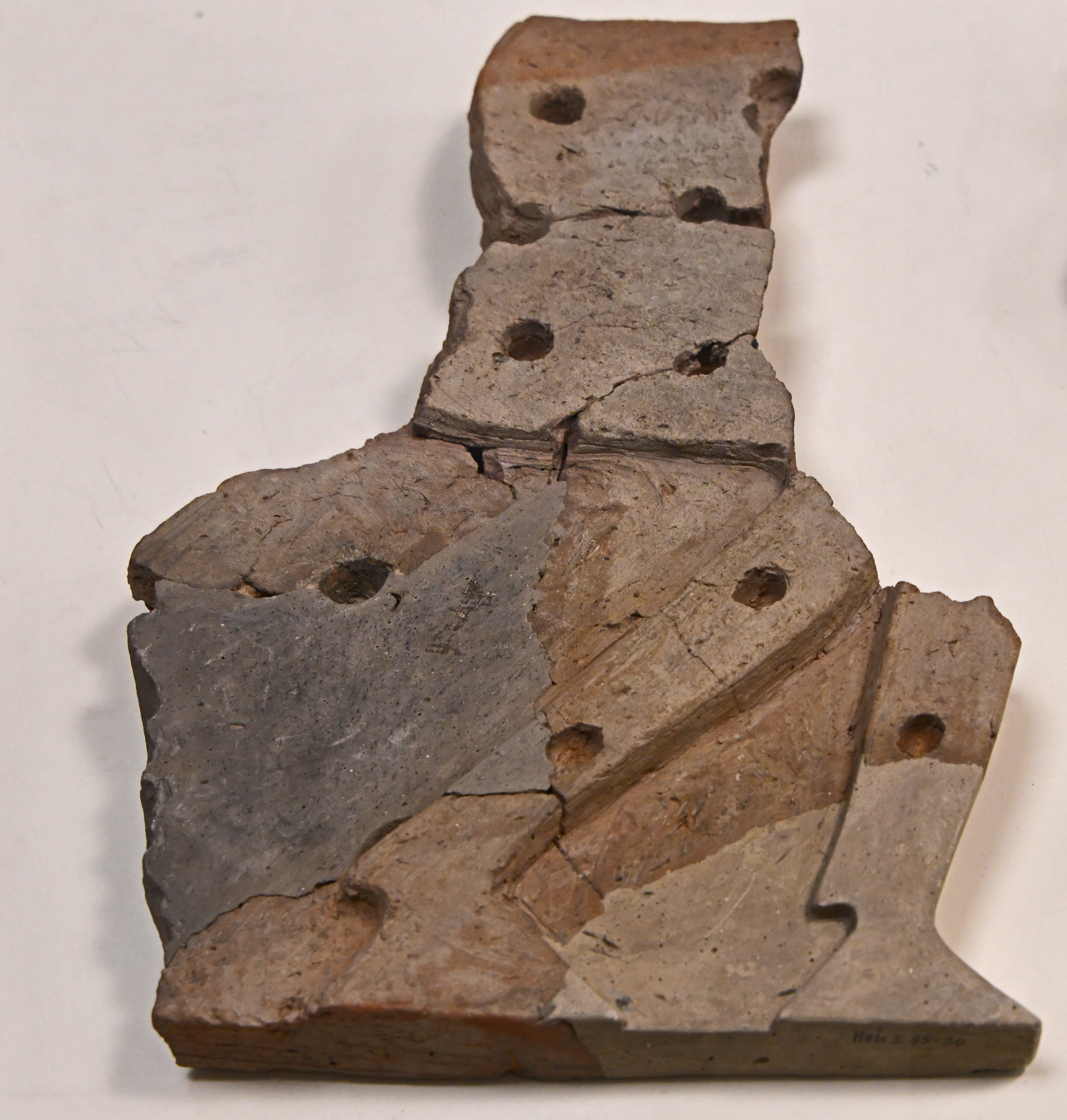
Late Uruk wall for mounting clay cones from Hassek Höyük

Five occupation layers were determined extending from the Late Chalcolithic period through the Early Bronze Age I:

- Phase 5a - Late Chalcolithic, Syro-Anatolian
- Phases 5b/c - Late Chalcolithic, Uruk Culture - c. 3400–3300 BC
- Destruction by conflagration
- Phases 4 to 1 - Early Bronze Age I - c. 3300-3000 BC

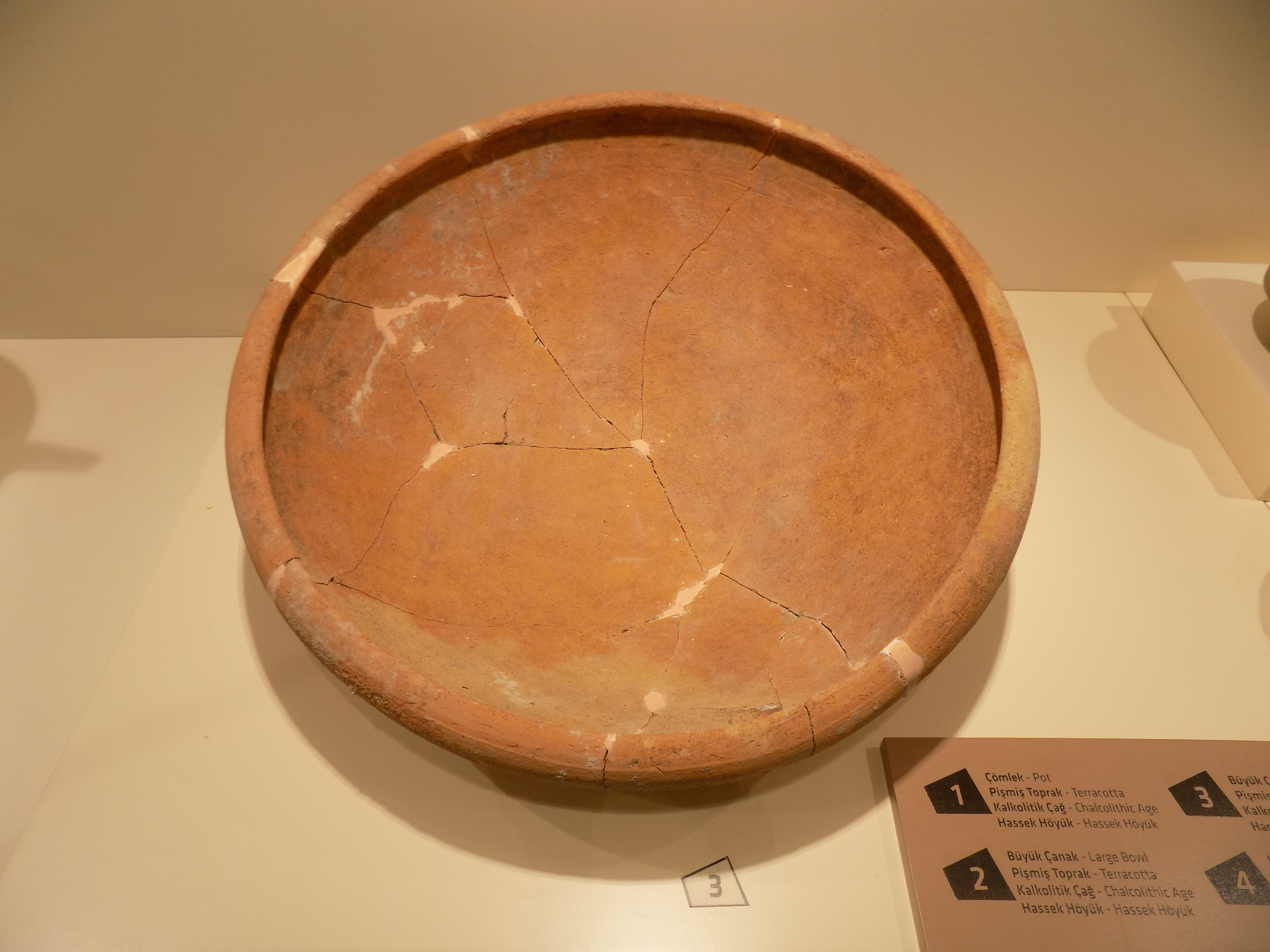
Late Chalcolithic bowl from Hassek Höyük

Layer analysis of the data led the excavators to add two more layers (EB Ib was marked by common clay sealings on pottery compared to the Late Uruk Phase 5):

- Phase 6 - Preceding Sumerian contact - c. 3500 BC
- Phase 0 - Early Bronze Age Ib - c. 2900 BC

Late chalcolithic period ceramic finds included Beveled rim bowls, diagnostic pottery of the Uruk culture as well as the typical clay building cones. There were also "eye idols" (found in Middle Uruk pits) and a number of clay tokens recovered. Early Bronze ceramic finds included painted Ninevite 5 vases with double pendant handles and pedestals. Metal finds included "a bronze knife with whetstone, a flat bronze axe, a large bronze pin, and a bronze chisel". Sawfish remains were found at all occupation levels. A number of stone lined graves, oriented in an east-west direction, were excavated. One tomb (Grave 12) on the summit of the mound, from the EB 1b period, was constructed of stone boulders and contained an adult male (roughly 37 years old, crouched lying on right side) skeleton with bronze grave goods of weapons and carpenters tools including two lance points, a dagger, two flat axes, a chisel and a macehead. Also in this period a cemetery of jar burials (94 pithos graves) lay about 700 meters west of the settlement mound on the bank of the Euphrates river. Most of the pithos burials in the cemetery had been looted in modern times or had been damaged by plowing. Overall at Hassek Höyük 120 pithos (jar) and cist burials, intra-mural and extra-mural, were found, many with metal grave goods (primarily pins and beads). A number of flint Canaanean blades, typically used as sickles for reaping cereal crops but sometimes as threshing sledges, were found in every phase. Obsidian at the site was found to be sourced from Nemrut Dağ, located west of Lake Van. Faunal remains were primarily sheep and goat followed by pigs and then cattle in prevalence.

== History ==
Occupation at the site began in the 4th millennium BC with slight traces, found in pits, from the Middle Uruk period. In the Late Uruk period the site became a trading colony of the Uruk culture (similarly to Habuba Kabira and Jebel Aruda) and a large walled acropolis was constructed on top of the mound. After this settlement was destroyed by conflagration it was soon resettled in the Early Bronze I period and a cemetery begun to the west of the mound. Afterward it was permanently abandoned.

== See also ==
- Cities of the ancient Near East
- Chronology of the ancient Near East
- Tilbeş Höyük
- Proto-cuneiform
- Tell Qraya
