= Çiçekköy =

Çiçekköy can refer to:

- Çiçekköy, Samsat
- Çiçekköy, Yapraklı
