= Gülpınar =

Gülpınar may refer to:

== People ==
- Serhat Gülpınar, Turkish footballer

== Places ==
- Gülpınar, Ayvacık, a village in Çanakkale Province, Turkey
- Gülpınar, Elazığ, formerly Sarıtosun, a village in Elazığ Province, Turkey
- Gülpınar, Gülağaç, a village in Aksaray Province, Turkey
- Gülpınar, Gülşehir, a village in Gülşehir District, Nevşehir Province, Turkey
- Gülpınar, Hassa, a village in Hatay Province, Turkey
- Gülpınar, Polatlı, a village in Ankara Province, Turkey
- Gülpınar, Samsat, a village in Adıyaman Province, Turkey
- Gülpınar, Yavuzeli, a village in Gaziantep Province, Turkey
- Gülpınar, Şahinbey, historically Kelpin, a village in Gaziantep Province, Turkey
