= Kuştepe, Samsat =

Village in Adıyaman Province, Turkey

Kuştepe
- Village
- Location in Turkey
- Coordinates: 37.525°N 38.397°E
- Country: Turkey
- Province: Adıyaman
- District: Samsat
- Population (2021): 73
- Time zone: UTC+3 (TRT)

Kuştepe (Kurdish: Berferat) is a village in the Samsat District of Adıyaman Province in Turkey. The village is populated by Kurds of the Bêzikan tribe and had a population of 73 in 2021.
