= Yarımbağ, Samsat =

Village in Adıyaman Province, Turkey

Yarımbağ
- Village
- Location in Turkey
- Coordinates: 37.559°N 38.478°E
- Country: Turkey
- Province: Adıyaman
- District: Samsat
- Population (2021): 353
- Time zone: UTC+3 (TRT)

Yarımbağ (Kurdish: Xurnîf) is a village in the Samsat District of Adıyaman Province in Turkey. The village is populated by Kurds of the Bêzikan tribe and had a population of 353 in 2021.

The hamlet of İnceali is attached to the village.
