= Akdamar, Samsat =

Village in Adıyaman Province, Turkey

Akdamar
- Village
- Location in Turkey
- Coordinates: 37.622°N 38.477°E
- Country: Turkey
- Province: Adıyaman
- District: Samsat
- Population (2021): 76
- Time zone: UTC+3 (TRT)

Akdamar (Kurdish: Mermer) is a village in the Samsat District of Adıyaman Province in Turkey. It is populated by Kurds of the Bêzikan tribe and had a population of 76 in 2021.
