= Tikunani =

Small city-state in Mesopotamia

Tikunani (or Tigunānum) was a small Hurrian city-state in Mesopotamia around the middle of the second millennium BC. The name refers to both the kingdom and its capital city.

== History ==
Assuming it does refer to the same city, Tigunānum is the older form of the name, appearing in texts excavated from Mari (c. 1760 BCE) and Shemshara around the 18th century BC in the Old Babylonian period.

The currently published texts from Tikunani all appear to date to the Middle Bronze Age to Late Bronze Age transition period in the 1600s BC. At that time Tikunani was frequently engaged in military activities involving bows, arrows, and chariots and directed against Kassites and the city of Ḫaḫḫum. Friendly relations were maintained with the Hittities to the west. In one text it reads:

"... These Kassites have stationed in your land, and they are coming up to Urpan to (present) battle. ... The chariots and the ʿabirū which are with my father, my father must send to me quickly; my father should not differ it. ... They should protect your city, Urpan. ..."

=== Tikunani Prism ===
The Tikunani Prism is a clay artifact, 8½ inches tall with a square base roughly 2 by 2 inches, with an Akkadian cuneiform inscription listing the names of 438 ʿApiru soldiers (or workmen, the reading is unclear) of King Tunip-Teššup of Tikunani. This king was a contemporary of King Hattusili I of the Hittites (around 1620 BC). It is of unknown provenance and is currently held in a private collection.

The discovery of this text initially generated much excitement, for it was suggested that it provided much-needed fresh evidence about the nature of the Habiru (or Hapiru) and their possible connection to the Biblical Hebrews. However, the majority of Tunip-Tessup's Habiru soldiers recorded in the text had Hurrian names that could not be explained in any Canaanite language (the family which Hebrew belongs to) or any other Semitic language. The rest of the names are Semitic, except for one Kassite name. The linkage between the ʿApiru and later Hebrews has since been discounted.

== Sources ==
All known sources are of unknown provenance. It has been suggested that they were illegally excavated in the 1990s. The cuneiform tablets bear a colophon which indicates they are part of a palace archive. Three tablets and two prisms, one administrative and one the Tikunani Prism are held in a private collection and have been published. Eleven tablets, five omen compendia, five administrative, and one lexical are held in the Schøyen Collection and have been published. Two tablets, one omen and one administrative are held in separate private collections and have been published. Fifteen omen tablets are held in Japan in the Hirayama Ikuo Silk Road Museum, yet unpublished.

It has been reported that about 450 further Tikunani tablets were held in a private collection, of which 17 have been published. Those tablets have since been sold at auction and their whereabouts unknown. Before the sale they were transliterated by W. G. Lambert. Those transcriptions are slowly making their way into publication, totally 44 by 2026. The collection included about "20 letters, 360 administrative texts, about 40 legal texts, 20 divinatory texts, a broken royal inscription, and a number of fragmentary school texts".

One of the private collection tablets, in Akkadian, from a Hittite king named only by the title "tabarna" is written to a vassal king, Tuniya (possibly the same as Tunip-Teššup), the ruler of Tikunani. In the letter the king extorts his vassal for support him in an attack against the city of Ḫaḫḫum who have been dealing with the Mitanni. The tablet is thought to date to the reign of Hittite ruler Hattusili I (c. 1650–1620 BC) though that is not certain. It has been suggested that this is a modern forgery. In the annals of Hattusilli I it is recorded that ruler Tunip-Teššup sent him a "silver chariot".

"... be a man with respect to the man of Hahhum. Devour his food rations like a dog! The oxen which you take shall be your own. The sheep and goats which you take shall be your own. Be a man with respect to him! I from this side, and you from that side. ..."

== Location ==
It was speculated that the location of Tikunani was in the area around Diyarbakir or Bismil,. Later work suggested that the region of the Upper Habur River that lies off the Euphrates River as the probable region of provenance.

== See also ==
- Cities of the Ancient Near East
- List of Mesopotamian deities
- List of Mesopotamian dynasties
