= Nissibi Bridge =

Nissibi Bridge Nissibi Köprüsü
- Coordinates: 37.899°N 38.974389°E
- Carries: 4 (2+2) lanes of D.360
- Crosses: Atatürk Reservoir on the Euphrates River
- Locale: Kahta, Adıyaman–Siverek, Şanlıurfa, Turkey

Characteristics
- Design: Cable-stayed bridge
- Material: Orthotropic deck steel
- Total length: 610 m (2,000 ft)
- Width: 24.50 m (80.4 ft)
- Longest span: 400 m (1,300 ft)

History
- Construction start: January 26, 2012
- Construction cost: ₺100 million
- Opened: May 21, 2015

Location
- Interactive map of Nissibi Bridge; Nissibi Köprüsü

The Nissibi Bridge (Turkish: Nissibi Köprüsü) is a cable-stayed bridge completed on May 21, 2015, spanning the Atatürk Reservoir on the Euphrates River at the provincial border of Adıyaman–Şanlıurfa in southeastern Turkey.

== History ==
With the forming of the reservoir lake of Atatürk Dam in 1992, the bridge on the highway Kahta–Siverek–Diyarbakır crossing the Euphrates River was inundated. The traffic between Adıyaman and Diyarbakır had to be diverted in the south to the route D.885 E99 over Şanlıurfa. Traffic was maintained also by ferry boats across the lake. To bypass the detour, a new bridge was projected crossing over the Atatürk Reservoir. The bridge will help shorten the route about 60 km (37 mi).

== Construction ==
The groundbreaking of the bridge was held in presence of Minister of Transport, Maritime and Communication Binali Yıldırım on January 26, 2012. The bridge is built by Gülsan Construction Co. It is named after the ancient town Nissibi situated in the vicinity. The cable-stayed orthotropic bridge is 610 m (2,000 ft) long and 24.50 m (80.4 ft) wide with a main span of 400 m (1,300 ft). Its two pylons are 96 m (315 ft) tall. The bridge will carry two lanes of traffic in each direction.

The cost of the construction is estimated to be ₺100 million.

The bridge was officially opened on May 21, 2015 by President Recep Tayyip Erdoğan.
