= Rabulas of Samosata =

Saint Rabulas of Samosata
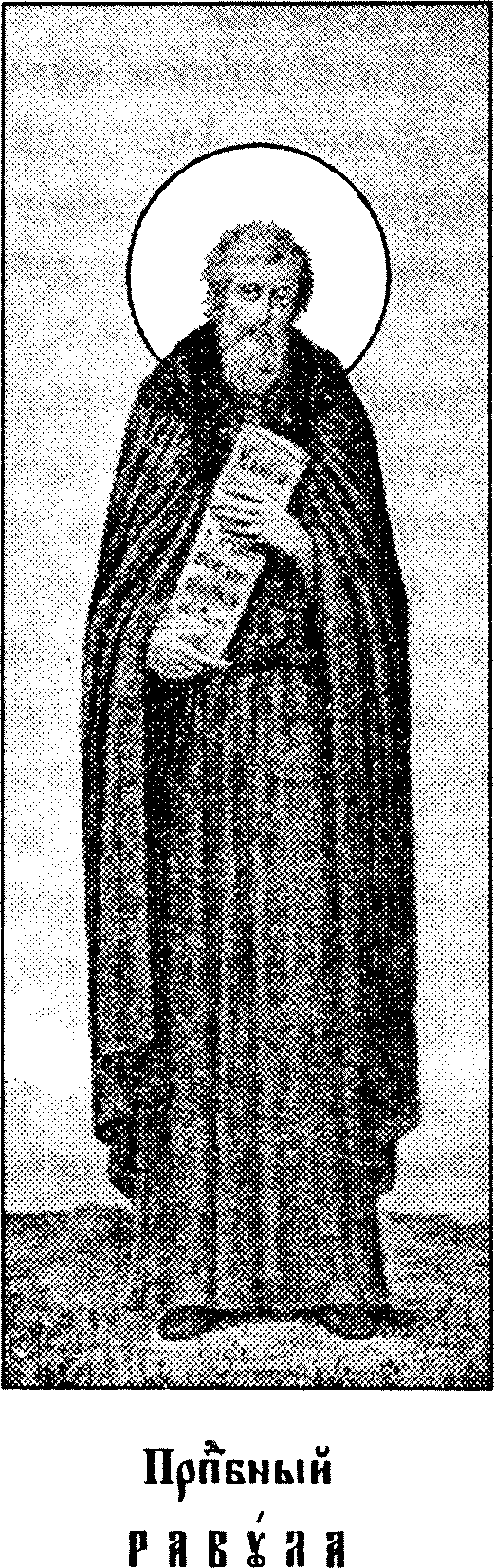
- Born: ~450 AD; Samosata (modern-day Samsat, Adıyaman, Turkey)
- Died: 530 AD
- Venerated in: Roman Catholic Church, Eastern Orthodox Church
- Feast: 19 February

Saint Rabulas (or Rabula) of Samosata (died 530 AD) was a monk and ascetic. A native of Samosata, and was educated there by a man named Baripsaba. He learned the Syriac language. Rabulas became an ascetic in the deserts and mountains, and then traveled to the Levant.

The Emperor Zeno provided Rabulas with funds to build a monastery in the middle of the mountains (the location of which has not been identified), the construction of which was supervised by Bishop John of Berytus. Rabulas’ monastery became a center for converting local peoples to Christianity. Rabulas then went to Constantinople, where the Emperor Anastasius I Dicorus supported the ascetic financially. Rabulas built more monasteries with these funds.
