= Samsat =

Settlement in Eastern Turkey

- Municipality
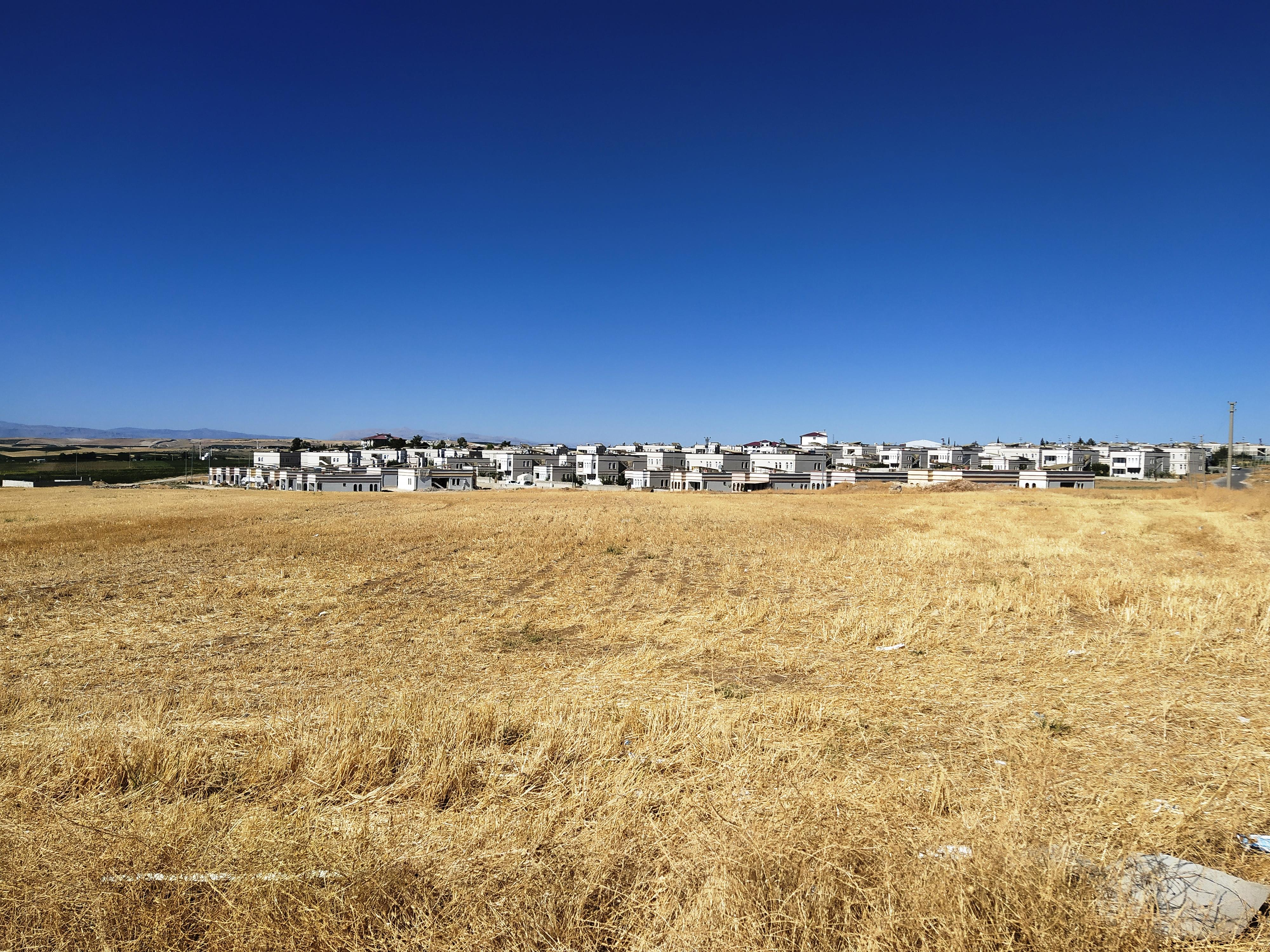

- Location within Turkey
- Coordinates: 37°34′46″N 38°28′53″E
- Country: Turkey
- Province: Adıyaman
- District: Samsat
- Established: 12th c. BC

Government
  - Mayor: Halil Fırat (AKP)
- Elevation: 610 m (2,000 ft)
- Population (2022): 3,790
- Time zone: UTC+3 (TRT)
- Website: www.samsat.bel.tr

Samsat (Kurdish: Samîsad, Ottoman Turkish صمصاد Semisat), formerly Samosata (Ancient Greek: Σαμόσατα) is a small town in the Adıyaman Province of Turkey, situated on the upper Euphrates river. It is the seat of Samsat District. The town is populated by Kurds of the Bêzikan tribe.

Halil Fırat from the Justice and Development Party (AKP) was elected mayor in the local elections in March 2019. The current Kaymakam is Halid Yıldız.

Samsat was the ancient capital of Kingdom of Commagene. The current site of Samsat is comparatively new, however, being rebuilt in 1989 when the old town of Samosata was flooded during the construction of the Atatürk Dam. As of 2018, reconstruction process had not yet been fully completed. An ancient tell nearby dating back to Paleolithic times has survived to the current day.

Its population was 3,790 in 2022, up from 3,520 in 2017.

== History ==
=== Hellenistic period ===
The city of Samosata was founded sometime before 245 BC on the previous Neo-Hittite site of Kummuh by the Orontid king of Sophene, Sames I. He may have founded the city in order to assert his claim over the area, a common practice amongst Iranian and Hellenistic dynasties, such as Cappadocia, Pontus, Parthia and Armenia. The city was built in a "sub-Achaemenid" Persian architectural form, similar to the rest of Orontid buildings in Greater Armenia. Naming cities such as Samosata (Middle Persian *Sāmašād; Old Persian *Sāmašiyāti-) the "joy of" or "happiness of" was an Orontid (and later Artaxiad) practice that recalled the Achaemenid royal discourse. Samosata served as one of the most important royal residences of the Orontid kings of Sophene.

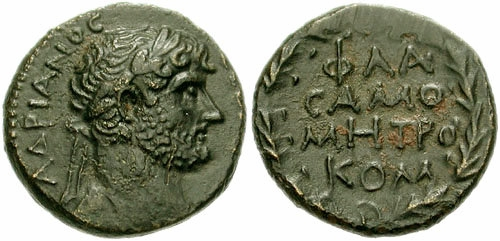
Coin of Hadrian from Samosata

Like other early-Orontid royal residences, Samosata experienced a sudden shift in its architectural style under the Orontids of Commagene due to their close involvement in the Greco-Roman world. During this period, Samosata was most likely populated by a variety of peoples, descended from Arameans, Assyrians, Neo-Hittites, Armenians, and Persians. Samosata was amongst the places where its ruler Antiochus I Theos (r. 70–31 BC) founded sanctuaries that contained inscriptions about his cult as well as reliefs of his dexiosis with Apollo-Mithras.

=== Roman period ===
In 73 AD, Samosata as well as the rest of Commagene was incorporated into the Roman Empire. It may have been during this event that the Syriac letter of Mara bar Serapion was composed. The letter makes mention of an Aramaic-speaking elite in Samosata that studied Greek literature and Stoic philosophy. Under the Roman emperor Hadrian (r. 117–138), Samosata was given metropolis status along with Damascus and Tyre.

Roman legions were later placed in Samosata to discourage the Sasanian Empire (224–651) from attacking it. In 260, it was the first city that was sacked by the Sasanian emperor Shapur I (r. 240–270) following his capture of the Roman emperor Valerian (r. 253–260). Shapur I is known to have had coins minted in the same fashion as the Roman antoninianus, which he may have taken from the material used in the mint of Samosata.

It was at Samosata that Julian II had ships made in his expedition against Shapur II, and it was a natural crossing-place in the struggle between Heraclius and Chosroes in the 7th century.

Samosata was the birthplace of several renowned people from antiquity such as Lucian (c. 120–192) and Paul of Samosata (fl. 260).

=== Medieval history ===
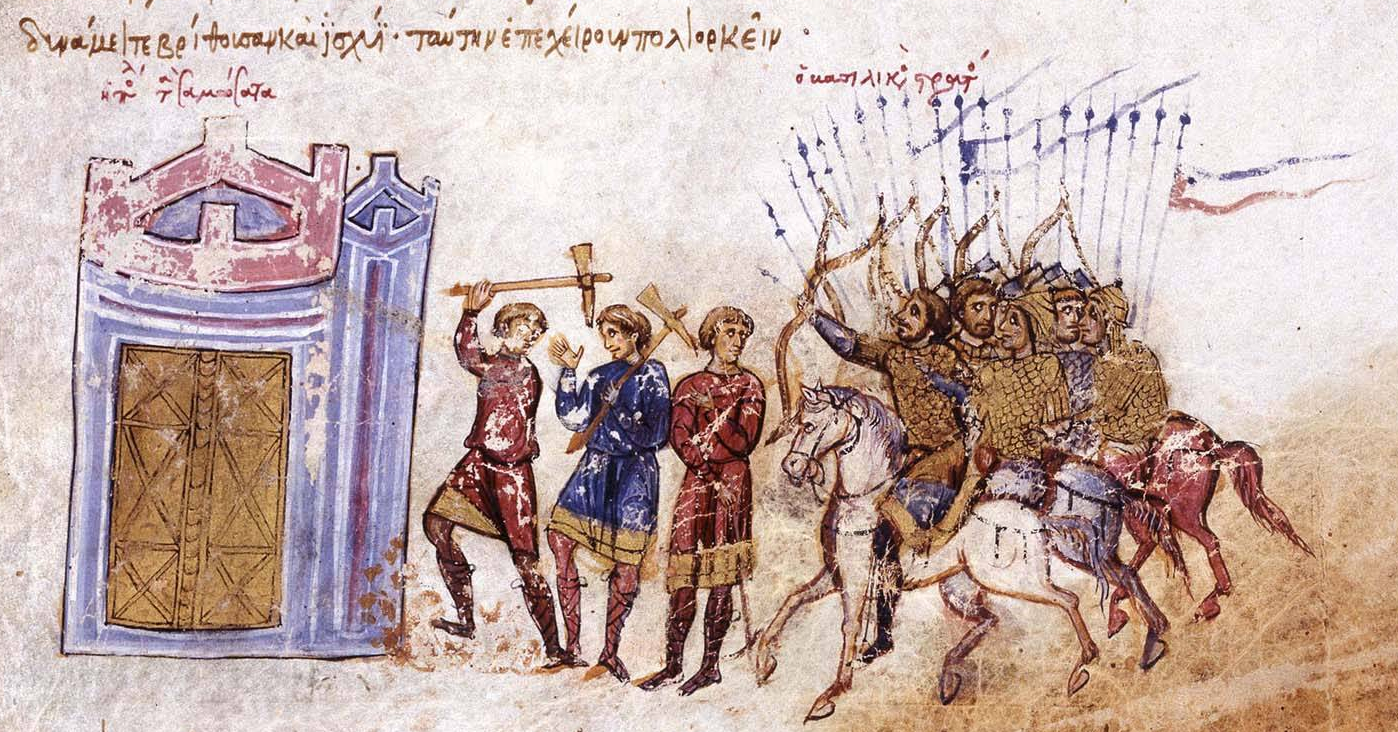
Depiction of the Byzantine attack on Samosata in 859, from the Madrid Skylitzes

The Arabs conquered Commagene from the Byzantines in 640. Safwan bin Muattal, a sahabi and commander during the Muslim conquests, was buried in Samosata.

In the tenth century, the town, which was the second biggest in the region after Melitene, was recaptured by the Byzantines. In June 966, Samosata was the venue of an exchange of prisoners between the Byzantine Emperor Nikephoros II Phokas and his Muslim foe Sayf al-Dawla.

After the collapse of Byzantine authority in the region, the town fell into the domain of the Armenian Philaretos Brachamios. At some point after that it fell into the hands of a certain Baluk, on of Amīr Ghāzī, who is mentioned among the army of Ridwan of Aleppo which besieged Edessa in 1095. While he managed to fend off an expedition in 1098 under Baldwin of Boulogne send by the ruler of Edessa, Thoros, he later had to sell the town to Baldwin for 10,000 gold coins upon which it belonged to the county of Edessa.

Warfare in the 13th century devastated Samosata. Rukn ad-Din Sulayman Shah II of the Anatolian Seljuks captured Samosata in 1203. The Anushtegins conquered and looted the town in 1237. The Mongol Emperor Hülagü Khan conquered Samosata in 1240 and the Beylik of Dulkadir conquered the town as well.

Samosata was temporarily absorbed into the Ottoman Empire by Bayazid I in 1392, and in 1401 it was destroyed by Timur. In 1516, the Ottoman Sultan Selim I recaptured it for the Ottomans who renamed it Samsat. It lost its old importance in the Ottoman administration and became the centre of a sanjak.

=== Modern times ===
During Turkey's republican period, the population of the town decreased. In 1960, Samsat was made a district center and connected to the province of Adıyaman.

The city of Samsat was evacuated from the old settlement on 5 March 1988 due to the construction of the Atatürk Dam. A new location for the settlement was announced through Law No. 3433 on 21 April 1988. The historical Samsat was submerged in 1989 as the dam created the Atatürk Reservoir. The new town was built beside the new waterline by the Turkish government to house the displaced residents.

The new town of Samsat was destroyed by an earthquake on 2 March 2017. The city was largely rebuilt afterwards.

=== In Christianity ===
In the Christian martyrology, seven Christian martyrs were crucified in 297 in Samosata for refusing to perform a pagan rite in celebration of the victory of Maximian over the Sassanids: Abibus, Hipparchus, James, Lollian, Paragnus, Philotheus, and Romanus. Paul the Dynamic Monarchian Bishop of Antioch was born in Samosata in 200; Saint Daniel the Stylite was born in a village near Samosata; Saint Rabbulas, venerated on 19 February, who lived in the 6th century at Constantinople, was also a native of Samosata. A Notitia Episcopatuum of Antioch in the 6th century mentions Samosata as an autocephalous metropolis (Échos d'Orient, X, 144); at the synod that reinstated Patriarch Photius I of Constantinople (the Photian Council) of 879, the See of Samosata had already been united to that of Amida, present-day Diyarbakır. By 586, the titular of Amida bore only this title, meaning the union took place between the 7th and the 9th centuries. Earlier bishops included Peperius, who attended the Council of Nicaea (325); Saint Eusebius of Samosata, a great opponent of the Arians, killed by an Arian woman (c. 380), honoured on 22 June; Andrew, a vigorous opponent of Cyril of Alexandria and of the Council of Ephesus.

Chabot gives a list of twenty-eight Syrian Miaphysite bishops. The Syrian bishopric probably lapsed in the 12th century. Samosata is included in the Catholic Church's list of titular sees, but no further titular bishops have been appointed for that eastern see since the Second Vatican Council.

== Archaeology ==
Samsat Höyük is a tell located just north of the Samsat district of Adıyaman. Archaeological research on the hill of Şehremuz in Samsat has uncovered relics from the 7000 BC Paleolithic era; the 5000 BC Neolithic, 3000 BC Chalcolithic and 3000 to 1200 BC Bronze Ages. The ancient city of Ḫaḫḫum (Hittite: Ḫaḫḫa) was located nearby; it is recorded as a source of gold for ancient Sumeria.

The first excavations were conducted in 1964 and 1967 under the direction of the American archeologist Theresa Goell in anticipation of the site being flooded by a new dam across the Euphrates at [Halfeti]. Work in 1964 consisted of a single shallow trench on the acropolis finding only medieval storage vessels. Work in 1967 excavated only down to the Seleucid period. Then, in 1977, under the Lower Euphrates Project, plans were put together aimed at identifying and saving the archaeological settlements that were to be inundated by the reservoir of Karakaya and Atatürk Dams. Surface surveys were conducted under the direction of Mehmet Özdoğan. In these studies, it was concluded that the settlement was permanently inhabited from the Halaf Period to the Ottoman Period. The following year, the excavations started in 1978, except for 1980, until 1987, under Ankara University, Faculty of Language and History-Geography It was conducted by the team led by Nimet Özgüç. These excavations were carried out on a very wide area, including the lower city and surrounding walls.

Coins belonging to the 12th - 13th centuries AD were identified during the excavations in the layers dating to the late phases of the Middle Ages. Of these Seljuk sultans I. Gıyaseddin Keyhusrev (1192–1195), Ala al-Din Keykubbad, (1219–1236), II. Gıyaseddin Keyhusrev (1236–1246), IV. Rükn el-Din The coins of Kılıç Arslan (1257–1264), as well as the coins of Saladin (1170–1193) printed in Harran, were uncovered.

The collection of glassware with cups, glasses and bowls is very rich. Other finds include oil lamps, ivory comb, fragrance bottle, terracotta lamps, bone spoons, leaf-shaped marble sconces and coins.

The walls of the Seljuk Period, built on a solid Byzantine fortress, were preserved intact. The inscription on the limestone of this fortification was studied by a master calligrapher. The landfill belonged to Diyarbekr Şah Karaaslan.

The centre of the palace, which is thought to be the central courtyard, is 14,65 X 20,55 meters and it has a mosaic corner.

The skeletons of five people thrown into a 1.8 meter diameter well of the Islamic Period were found. At the bottom with the skeletons, five gold coins and silver coins from the Abbasid Period were found. One of the gold coins belongs to Harun al-Rashid (766 - 709) and the others to Mutawakkil (822 - 861).

Today the settlement is under the Euphrates, but before inundation it was 37–40 meters above the plain level and had an area of 500 x 350 meters. The steepest slope is the eastern slope and the lowest slope is the southwest-facing slope. The mound consists of a terrace and a ruined town covered with sediment. Samsat Höyük as an archaeological site is considered to be no longer accessible while it is covered by the waters of the reservoir. The old town of Samosata below the tell was not excavated.

== Sources ==
- Andrade, Nathanael J. (2013), Syrian Identity in the Greco-Roman World, Cambridge, England: Cambridge University Press, ISBN 978-1-107-01205-9
- Beihammer, Alexander Daniel (2017). Byzantium and the Emergence of Muslim Turkish Anatolia, ca. 1040-1130. Routledge. ISBN 978-1-138-22959-4.
- Canepa, Matthew (2021). "Commagene Before and Beyond Antiochos I: Dynastic Identity, Topographies of Power and Persian Spectacular Religion". Common Dwelling Place of all the Gods: Commagene in its Local, Regional, and Global Context. Franz Steiner Verlag. pp. 71–103. ISBN 978-3515129251.
- Canepa, Matthew (2018). The Iranian Expanse: Transforming Royal Identity Through Architecture, Landscape, and the Built Environment, 550 BCE–642 CE. Oakland: University of California Press. ISBN 9780520379206.
- Curtis, Vesta Sarkhosh; Stewart, Sarah (2008). The Sasanian Era. I.B. Tauris. ISBN 978-1845116903.
- Fattori, Niccolò (June 2013). "The Policies of Nikephoros II Phokas in the context of the Byzantine economic recovery" (PDF). Middle East Technical University.
- Gyselen, Rika (2010). "Romans and Sasanians in the Third Century. Propaganda warfare and ambiguous imagery". In Börm, Henning; Wiesehöfer, Josef (eds.). Commutatio Et Contentio. Wellem Verlag. pp. 71–120. ISBN 978-1463239886.
- Haase, C.P. (1997). "Sumaysāṭ". In Bosworth, C. E.; van Donzel, E.; Heinrichs, W. P. & Lecomte, G. (eds.). The Encyclopaedia of Islam, Second Edition. Volume IX: San–Sze. Leiden: E. J. Brill. ISBN 978-90-04-10422-8.
- Michels, Christoph (2021). "'Achaemenid' and 'Hellenistic' Strands of Representation in the Minor Kingdoms of Asia Minor". Common Dwelling Place of all the Gods: Commagene in its Local, Regional, and Global Context. Franz Steiner Verlag. pp. 475–496. ISBN 978-3515129251.
