= Ovacık, Samsat =

Village in Adıyaman Province, Turkey

Ovacık
- Village
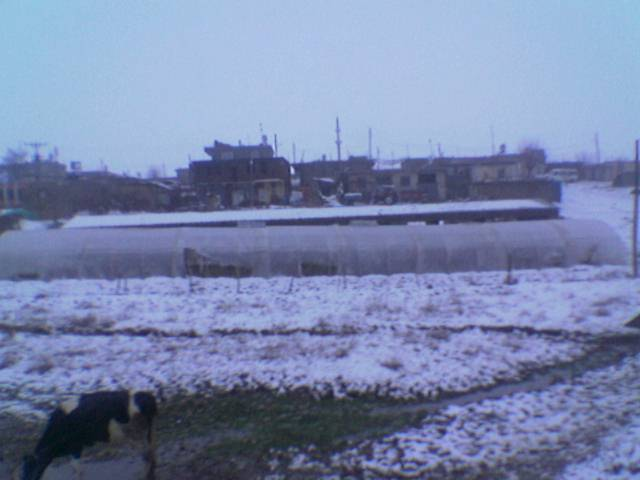
- The village Ovacık

- Location within Turkey
- Coordinates: 37.647°N 38.489°E
- Country: Turkey
- Province: Adıyaman
- District: Samsat
- Population (2021): 116
- Time zone: UTC+3 (TRT)
- Postal code: 02800
- Area code: 0416

Ovacık (Kurdish: Tûzik) is a village in the Samsat District of Adıyaman Province in Turkey. The village is populated by Kurds of the Bêzikan tribe and had a population of 116 in 2021.
