= Kırmacık, Samsat =

Village in Adıyaman Province, Turkey

Kırmacık
- Village
- Location in Turkey
- Coordinates: 37°32′N 38°28′E
- Country: Turkey
- Province: Adıyaman
- District: Samsat
- Population (2021): 266
- Time zone: UTC+3 (TRT)

Kırmacık (Kurdish: Hayik) is a village in the Samsat District of Adıyaman Province in Turkey. The village is populated by Kurds of the Bêzikan tribe and had a population of 266 in 2021.

The hamlet of Bakacak is attached to the village.
