= Göltarla, Samsat =

Village in Adıyaman Province, Turkey

Göltarla
- Village
- Location in Turkey
- Coordinates: 37.608°N 38.441°E
- Country: Turkey
- Province: Adıyaman
- District: Samsat
- Population (2021): 175
- Time zone: UTC+3 (TRT)

Göltarla (Kurdish: Bîrgenî) is a village in the Samsat District of Adıyaman Province in Turkey. The village is populated by Kurds of the Bêzikan tribe and had a population of 175 in 2021.

The hamlets of Keçiören and Sarıkök are attached to the village.
