= Tepeönü, Samsat =

Village in Adıyaman Province, Turkey

Tepeönü
- Village
- Location in Turkey
- Coordinates: 37.605°N 38.537°E
- Country: Turkey
- Province: Adıyaman
- District: Samsat
- Population (2021): 30
- Time zone: UTC+3 (TRT)

Tepeönü (Kurdish: Gewrik) is a village in the Samsat District of Adıyaman Province in Turkey. The village is populated by Kurds of the Bêzikan tribe and had a population of 30 in 2021.

The hamlets of Bekçiler and Sefaköy are attached to Tepeönü.
