= Uzuntepe, Samsat =

Village in Adıyaman Province, Turkey

Uzuntepe
- Village
- Location in Turkey
- Coordinates: 37.6024°N 38.4846°E
- Country: Turkey
- Province: Adıyaman
- District: Samsat
- Population (2021): 424
- Time zone: UTC+3 (TRT)

Uzuntepe (Kurdish: Selîk) is a village in the Samsat District of Adıyaman Province in Turkey. The village is populated by Kurds of the Bêzikan tribe and had a population of 424 in 2021.

The hamlet of Ağaköy is attached to Uzuntepe.

== History ==
The village was visited by Carl Humann and Otto Puchstein in 1882 describing it as a "small, dirty Kurdish village" where no one spoke Turkish.
