= Doğanca, Samsat =

Village in Adıyaman Province, Turkey

Doğanca
- Village
- Location in Turkey
- Coordinates: 37.633°N 38.463°E
- Country: Turkey
- Province: Adıyaman
- District: Samsat
- Population (2021): 324
- Time zone: UTC+3 (TRT)

Doğanca (Kurdish: Merazî) is a village in the Samsat District of Adıyaman Province in Turkey. The village had a population of 324 in 2021.
