= Kovanoluk, Samsat =

Village in Adıyaman Province, Turkey

Kovanoluk
- Village
- Location in Turkey
- Coordinates: 37.578°N 38.533°E
- Country: Turkey
- Province: Adıyaman
- District: Samsat
- Population (2021): 32
- Time zone: UTC+3 (TRT)

Kovanoluk (Kurdish: Birîman) is a village in the Samsat District of Adıyaman Province in Turkey. The village is populated by Kurds of the Bêzikan and Birîman tribes and had a population of 32 in 2021.
