= Expedition to Samosata =

- Part of the First Crusade
Date	1098
Location	Anatolia
Result	Inconclusive: Decline of Turkish raids into Edessa
Territorial changes	Capture of the village of St. John by the Crusaders

Belligerents
Emirate of Samosata	County of Edessa

Commanders and leaders
Balduk	Baldwin I of Jerusalem; Constantine of Gargar

Strength
Unknown	80 Crusader Knights, a few thousand Edessenes

Casualties and losses
Unknown	~1,000 Edessenes killed

The Expedition to Samosata was undertaken by Baldwin following his ascension to co-regent of Edessa as a part of the First Crusade. His main goal was to eliminate the emirate of Samosata as a commercial and military rival of the Edessene state. The expedition was carried out from 14 to 20 February 1098.

== Background ==
Baldwin decided upon his ascension of co-regent of Edessa that Samosata would have to be eliminated in order for his new county to fully control the surrounding countryside and to establish unbroken communications with Byzantium in the west and the Crusaders sieging Antioch in the south. The Christian Armenian inhabitants of Edessa enthusiastically supported his plan, and the main part of their military accompanied him. He set out on 14 February 1098, also accompanied by an Armenian princeling, Constantine of Gargar.

== Expedition ==
Despite the help of the Edessene militia, the expedition did not turn out favorably for Baldwin. The Edessenes were poor, inexperienced soldiers, and the company was quickly caught in an ambush by the Turks of Samosata, who slew around a thousand of them in the ensuing battle. Baldwin, however, did manage to capture and garrison the village of St. John, which was close to Balduk's capital. From this point, he was able to control the flow of the Turks in and out of the city, resulting in a decline in Turkish raids into the Edessene countryside.

== Sources ==
Runciman, Steven (1951–52). A History of the Crusades I: The First Crusade. Penguin Classics. ISBN 978-0-141-98550-3.
