= Kızılöz, Samsat =

Village in Adıyaman Province, Turkey

Kızılöz
- Village
- Location in Turkey
- Coordinates: 37.501°N 38.382°E
- Country: Turkey
- Province: Adıyaman
- District: Samsat
- Population (2021): 77
- Time zone: UTC+3 (TRT)

Kızılöz (Kurdish: Bircik) is a village in the Samsat District of Adıyaman Province in Turkey. The village is populated by Kurds of the Bêzikan tribe and had a population of 77 in 2021.
