= Gölpınar, Samsat =

Village in Adıyaman Province, Turkey

Gölpınar
- Village
- Location in Turkey
- Coordinates: 37.575°N 38.428°E
- Country: Turkey
- Province: Adıyaman
- District: Samsat
- Population (2021): 129
- Time zone: UTC+3 (TRT)

Gölpınar (Kurdish: Golpîngar) is a village in the Samsat District of Adıyaman Province in Turkey. The village is populated by Kurds of the Bêzikan tribe and had a population of 129 in 2021.

The hamlet of Harabe is attached to Gölpınar.
