= Taşkuyu, Samsat =

Village in Adıyaman Province, Turkey

Taşkuyu
- Village
- Location in Turkey
- Coordinates: 37°37′N 38°30′E
- Country: Turkey
- Province: Adıyaman
- District: Samsat
- Population (2021): 592
- Time zone: UTC+3 (TRT)

Taşkuyu (Kurdish: Bîrik) is a village in the Samsat District of Adıyaman Province in Turkey. It is populated by Kurds of the Bêzikan tribe and had a population of 592 in 2021.
