= Atatürk Reservoir =

- Lake Atatürk Dam
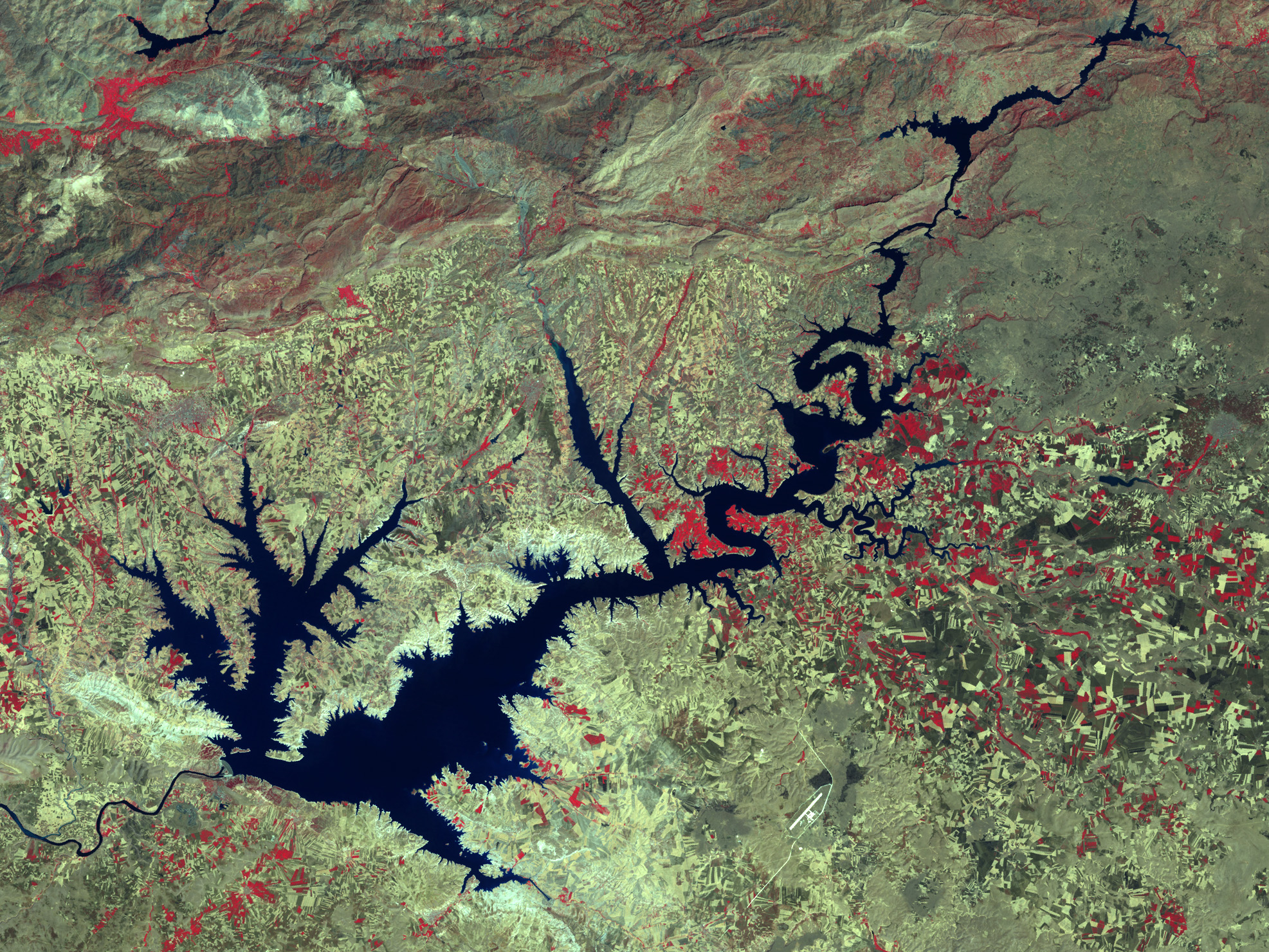
- August 2002 image of the reservoir, taken by Landsat 7

- Location within Turkey
- Location: Adıyaman / Şanlıurfa / Diyarbakır provinces, Turkey
- Coordinates: 37°35′29″N 38°37′15″E
- Type: reservoir
- Primary inflows: Euphrates
- Primary outflows: Euphrates
- Basin countries: Turkey
- Max. length: 180 kilometres (110 mi)
- Surface area: 817 km^{2} (202,000 acres)
- Water volume: 48.5 km^{3} (39,300,000 acre⋅ft)
- Surface elevation: 542 metres (1,778 ft) above sea level.

The Atatürk Reservoir (Turkish: Atatürk Baraj Gölü) is a reservoir on the Euphrates, created by the Atatürk Dam in Turkey. It is located between Adıyaman, Şanlıurfa, and Diyarbakır provinces. The reservoir has a surface area of 817 km^{2} and a volume of 48.5 cubic kilometers, making it the third largest lake in the country after Lake Van and Lake Tuz. It was formed between 1990 and 1992. The reservoir water level touched 535 m (1,755 ft) amsl in 1994. Since then, it varies between 526 and 537 m amsl. The full reservoir level is 542 m (1,778 ft), and the minimum operation level is 526 m (1,726 ft) amsl.

Some 10 towns and 156 villages of three provinces are located around the Atatürk Reservoir. The reservoir has changed the climate and vegetation of the region. The lake provides a fisheries and recreation site. For transportation purposes, several ferries have been operated in the reservoir. The reservoir lake is called "sea" by local people.

== Irrigation ==
Nearly 4,760 km^{2} (1,840 sq mi) of arable land in the Şanlıurfa-Harran and Mardin-Ceylanpınar plains in upper Mesopotamia is being irrigated via gravity-flow with water diverted from the Atatürk Reservoir through the Şanlıurfa Tunnels system, which consists of two parallel tunnels, each 26.4 km (16.4 mi) long and 7.62 m (25.0 ft) in diameter. The flow rate of water through the tunnels is about 328 m^{3}/s (11,600 cu ft/s), which makes one-third of the total flow of the Euphrates. The tunnels are the largest in the world, in terms of length and flow rate, built for irrigation purposes. The first tunnel was completed in 1995 and the other in 1996. The reservoir will irrigate another 406,000 ha by pumping for a total of 882,000 ha.

The Atatürk Dam and the Şanlıurfa Tunnel system are two major components of the GAP project. Irrigation started in the Harran Plain in the spring of 1995. Approximately 900,000 hectares of land in the Harran Plain is irrigated. The impact of the irrigation on the economy of the region is significant. In ninety percent of the irrigated area, cotton is planted. Irrigation expansion within the Harran plains also increased Southeastern Anatolia's cotton production from 164,000 to 400,000 metric tons in 2001, or nearly sixty percent. With almost 50% share of the country's cotton production, the region developed to the leader in Turkey.

With the Suruç Tunnel, which was completed in 2014, irrigation is carried out in the Suruç Plain with the water of the reservoir. In addition, the reservoir provides drinking and utility water to Şanlıurfa.

== Fishery ==
Atatürk Reservoir is an abundant source of food for local people and also provides opportunities for recreational fishing. In 1992, around 200,000 young fish (fingerlings), propagated in DSI's Atatürk Fish Hatchery, were introduced into the reservoir. Since then, the figure of fingerlings stocked into the lake reached around 33 million.

Commercially fishing in the reservoir developed to a catch of around annually 1,000 tons of some fish species with a market value of US$1.26 million. 8 of the 12 fish species being caught are economically valuable. In addition, the lake has a potential for cage culture of 7,000 tons/year worth of US$14 million.

With the aim of utilizing the fishing potential and creating jobs for the lakeside populations, the reservoir is zoned to 21 fishing sectors, each one having a water products cooperative. Considering all aspects of fishery activities, the reservoir contributes in total US$15 million to GNP and generates employment for 1,600 people.

== Transportation ==
With the completion of Nissibi Bridge in 2015, a highway connection has been established between the two sides of the lake. Before 2015, transportation between Kahta and Siverek was carried out by ferry. Ferry services have been organized between Çermik and Gerger since 2012.

== Pollution ==
The increase in the population living around the Atatürk Reservoir causes pollution of the lake. Adıyaman's wastewater is discharged into the lake without being treated. Fishing activities in the lake also have a share in pollution.

== Recreation and sports ==
In order to open the region to tourism, to introduce modern sports to the local people and to integrate the social and economic progress taking place in the region with sports as a drive, a water sports festival was established in 1994, which takes place each year in September. The young people in the region developed an interest in water sports and started to take part in international contests in the branches of sailing, rowing-canoeing, swimming and diving on the Atatürk Reservoir.

Furthermore, International Atatürk Dam Sailing Competition takes place every year in October on the lake.

== Resettlement and salvaging cultural heritage ==
With the forming of the reservoir lake, more than a hundred hamlets and villages were inundated and about 55,000 people were forced to relocate, many of them resettling in nearby communities. According to other sources, the construction of the dam resulted in involuntary resettlement of between 45,000 and 53,500 people.

In 1989, the old town of Samosata (Samsat), capital of the ancient Commagene kingdom located in Adıyaman Province was flooded behind the Atatürk Dam. A new town with the same name, Samsat, was founded for the 2,000 people dislocated.

The birthplace of the Ancient Greek poet Lucian was lost when the dam was created.

Since the entire GAP area was home to the early civilization of the Hittites and the site of Nevalı Çori, and therefore rich in terms of historical remains, the cultural heritage of the region was a concern. The subject of salvaging cultural heritages gained importance, particularly after the inundation of Samsat.

The early Neolithic settlement of Nevalı Çori, site of some of the world's most ancient known temples and monumental sculpture, was discovered during rescue excavations before the dam was completed. Nevalı Çori was inundated by Atatürk Reservoir.
