= Atatürk Dam =

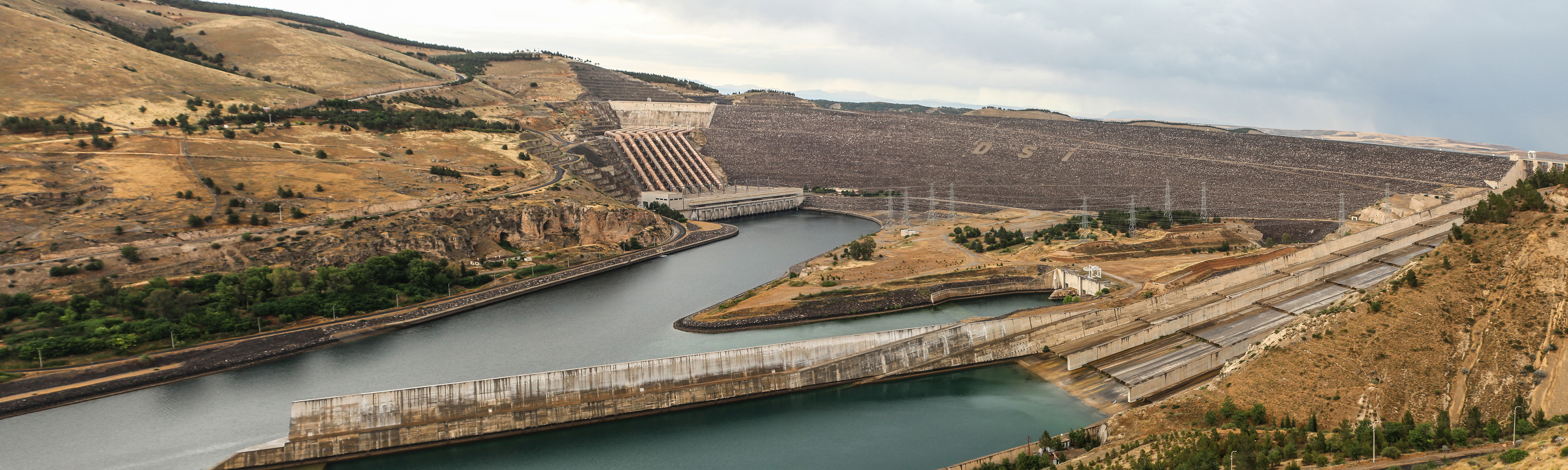
- Atatürk Dam

- Location within Turkey
- Interactive map of Atatürk Dam
- Official name: Atatürk Dam
- Location: Şanlıurfa-Adıyaman, Turkey
- Coordinates: 37°28′54″N 38°19′03″E
- Construction began: 1983
- Opening date: 1992
- Operator: State Hydraulic Works (DSİ)

Dam and spillways
- Impounds: Euphrates
- Height: 169 m (554 ft)
- Length: 1,819 m (5,968 ft)

Reservoir
- Creates: Atatürk Reservoir
- Total capacity: 48,700,000,000 m^{3} (39,500,000 acre⋅ft)
- Surface area: 817 km^{2} (315 sq mi)

Power Station
- Turbines: 8 x 300 MW Francis-type
- Installed capacity: 2,400 MW
- Annual generation: 8,900 gigawatt-hours (32,000 TJ)

The Atatürk Dam (Turkish: Atatürk Barajı), originally the Karababa Dam, is the fourth largest dam in the world and it is a zoned rock-fill dam with a central core on the Euphrates River on the border of Adıyaman Province and Şanlıurfa Province in the Southeastern Anatolia Region of Turkey. Built both to generate electricity and to irrigate the plains in the region, it was renamed in honour of Mustafa Kemal Atatürk (1881–1938), the founder of the Turkish Republic. The construction began in 1983 and was completed in 1990. The dam and the hydroelectric power plant, which went into service after the upfilling of the reservoir was completed in 1992, are operated by the State Hydraulic Works (DSİ). The reservoir created behind the dam, called Atatürk Reservoir (Turkish: Atatürk Baraj Gölü), is the third largest in Turkey.

The dam is situated 23 km (14 mi) northwest of Bozova, Şanlıurfa Province, on state road D-875 from Bozova to Adıyaman. Centerpiece of the 22 dams on the Euphrates and the Tigris, which comprise the integrated, multi-sector, Southeastern Anatolia Project (Turkish: Güney Doğu Anadolu Projesi, known as GAP), it is one of the world's largest dams. The Atatürk Dam, one of the five operational dams on the Euphrates as of 2008, was preceded by Keban and Karakaya dams upstream and followed by Birecik and the Karkamış dams downstream. Two more dams on the river have been under construction.

The dam embankment is 169 m (554 ft) high and 1,820 m (5,970 ft) long. The hydroelectric power plant (HEPP) has a total installed power capacity of 2,400 MW and generates 8,900 GW·h electricity annually. The total cost of the dam project was about US$1,250,000,000.

The dam was depicted on the reverse of the Turkish one-million-lira banknote of 1995–2005 and of the 1 new lira banknote of 2005–2009.

== Dam ==
The initial development project for the southeastern region of Turkey was presented in 1970. As the objectives for regional development have changed significantly and the ambitions have grown in the 1970s, the original plan underwent major modifications. The most important change in the project was abandoning the Middle Karababa Dam design, and adopting the design of the Atatürk Dam to increase the storage and power generation capacities of the dam.

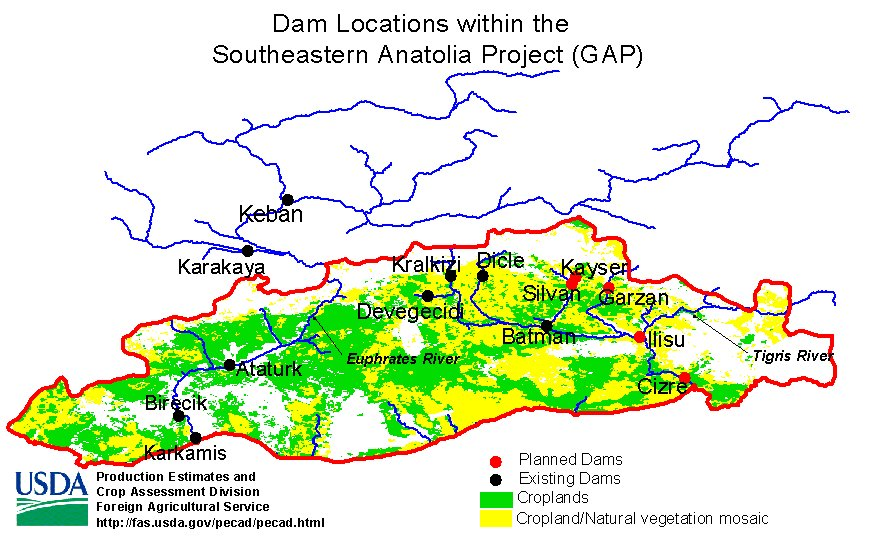

Dolsar Engineering and ATA Construction, two prominent Turkish companies, signed for the building of the dam. The construction of the cofferdam began in 1985 and was completed in 1987. The fill work for the main dam lasted from 1987 to 1990. The Atatürk Dam, listed in international construction publications as the world's largest construction site, was completed in a world record time of around 50 months.

The rock-fill dam undergoes deformations that are regularly and systematically monitored since 1990 with different types of sensors. It is estimated that the central portion of the dam crest has settled by around 7 m (23 ft) since the end of the construction. Settlement of the dam crest up to 4.3 m (14 ft) has been measured since the start of the detailed geodetic monitoring in 1992. The maximum horizontal (radial) deformation measured is about 2.9 m (9.5 ft).

The permeation grouting work was carried out by subcontractor Solétanche Bachy and the rehabilitation work for the post-tensioning of the dam crest with ground anchors by Vorspann System Losinger International (VSL).

== Hydroelectric power plant ==
The HEPP of the Atatürk Dam is the biggest of a series of 19 power plants of the GAP project. It consists of eight Francis turbine and generator groups of 300 MW each, supplied by Sulzer Escher Wyss and ABB Asea Brown Boveri respectively. The up to 7.25-metre-diameter (23.8 ft) steel pressure pipes (penstocks) with a total weight of 26.600 tons were supplied and installed by the German NOELL company (today DSD NOELL). The power plant's first two power units came on line in 1992 and it became fully operational in December 1993. The HEPP can generate 8,900 GWh of electricity annually. Its capacity makes up around one third of the total capacity of the GAP project.

During the periods of low demand for electricity, only one of the eight units of the HEPP is in operation while in times of high demand, all the eight units are in operation. Hence, depending upon the energy demand and the state of the interconnected system, the daily water release from the HEPP might vary between 200 and 2,000 m^{3}/s.

== Irrigation ==
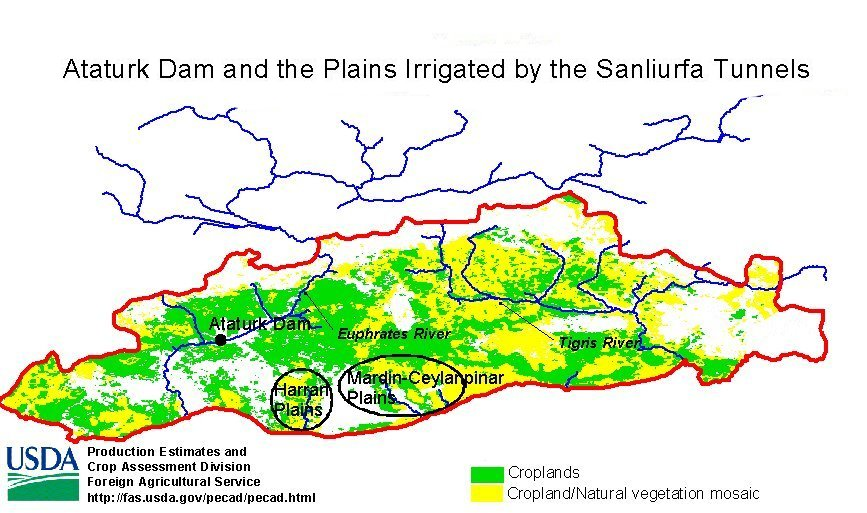

Originating in the mountains of eastern Anatolia and flowing southwards to Syria and Iraq, the Euphrates and the Tigris are very irregular rivers, which used to cause great problems each year with droughts in summer and flooding in winter. The water of the Euphrates River is regulated by means of large reservoirs of the Keban and Atatürk Dams. However, the waters released from the HEPPs of those dams also need to be regulated. The Birecik and the Karkamış Dams located downstream of the Atatürk Dam were constructed to harness the waters released from large-scale dams and HEPPs.

Nearly 4,760 km^{2} (1,840 sq mi) of arable land in the Şanlıurfa-Harran and Mardin-Ceylanpınar plains in upper Mesopotamia is being irrigated via gravity-flow with water diverted from the Atatürk Dam through the Şanlıurfa Tunnels system, which consists of two parallel tunnels, each 26.4 km (16.4 mi) long and 7.62 m (25.0 ft) in diameter. The flow rate of water through the tunnels is about 328 m^{3}/s (11,600 cu ft/s), which makes one-third of the total flow of the Euphrates. The tunnels are the largest in the world, in terms of length and flow rate, built for irrigation purposes. The first tunnel was completed in 1995 and the other in 1996. The reservoir behind the dam will irrigate another 406,000 ha by pumping for a total of 882,000 ha.

The Atatürk Dam and the Şanlıurfa Tunnel system are two major components of the GAP project. Irrigation started in the Harran Plain in the spring of 1995. The impact of the irrigation on the economy of the region is significant. In ninety percent of the irrigated area, cotton is planted. Irrigation expansion within the Harran plains also increased Southeastern Anatolia's cotton production from 164,000 to 400,000 metric tons in 2001, or nearly sixty percent. With almost 50% share of the country's cotton production, the region developed to the leader in Turkey.

== Reservoir lake ==
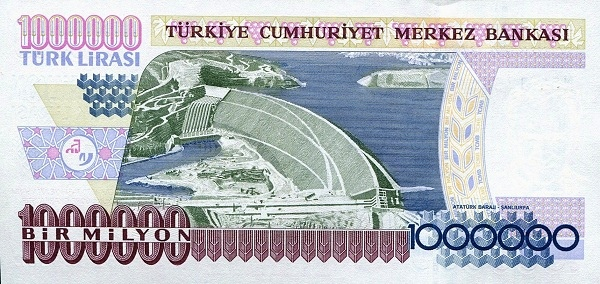
Reverse of the 1 million Turkish lira banknote, depicting the Atatürk Dam (1995–2005).

The Atatürk Reservoir, extending over an area of 817 km^{2} (315 sq mi) with a water volume of 48.7 km^{3} (63,400 million cu yd), ranks third in size in Turkey after Lake Van and Lake Tuz. The reservoir water level touched 535 m (1,755 ft) amsl in 1994. Since then, it varies between 526 and 537 m amsl. The full reservoir level is 542 m (1,778 ft), and the minimum operation level is 526 m (1,726 ft) amsl.

Some 10 towns and 156 villages of three provinces are located around the Lake Atatürk Dam. The lake provides a fisheries and recreation site. For transportation purposes, several ferries have been operated in the reservoir. The reservoir lake is called "sea" by local people.

== Geostrategic importance ==
About 90% of Euphrates' total annual flow originates in Turkey, while the remaining part is added in Syria, but nothing is contributed further downstream in Iraq. In general, the stream varies greatly in its flow from season to season and year to year. As an example, the annual flow at the border with Syria ranged from 15.3 km^{3} (3.7 cu mi) in 1961 to 42.7 km^{3} (10.2 cu mi) in 1963.

One of the most important legal texts on the waters of the Euphrates-Tigris river system is the protocol annexed to the 1946 Treaty of Friendship and Good Neighborly Relations between Iraq and Turkey. The protocol provided the control and management of the Euphrates and the Tigris depending to a large extent on the regulations of flow in Turkish source areas. Turkey agreed to begin monitoring the two border-crossing rivers and to share related data with Iraq. In 1980, Turkey and Iraq further specified the nature of the earlier protocol by forming a joint committee on technical issues, which Syria joined later in 1982 as well. Turkey unilaterally guaranteed to allow 15.75 km^{3}/year (500 m^{3}/s) of water across the border to Syria without any formal agreement on the sharing of the Euphrates water.

Mid-January 1990, when the first phase of the dam was completed, Turkey held back the flow of the Euphrates entirely for a month to begin filling up the reservoir. Turkey had notified Syria and Iraq by November 1989 of her decision to fill the reservoir over a period of one month explaining the technical reasons and providing a detailed program for making up for the losses. The downstream neighbors protested vehemently. At this point, the Atatürk Dam has cut the flow from the Euphrates by about a third.

Syria and Iraq claim to be suffering severe water shortages due to the GAP development. Both countries allege that Turkey is intentionally withholding supplies from its downstream neighbors, turning water into a weapon. Turkey denies these claims, and insists it has always supplied its southern neighbors with the promised minimum of 500 m^{3}/s (18,000 cu ft/s). It argues that Iraq and Syria in fact benefit from the regulated water by the dams as they protect all three riparian countries from seasonal droughts and floods.

Two damaging earthquakes of M _{w} 5.5 and M _{w} 5.1 occurred in the town of Samsat near the Atatürk Reservoir in 2017 and 2018, respectively. The spatio-temporal evolution of seismicity and its source properties in relation to the temporal water-level variations and the stresses resulting from surface loading and pore-pressure diffusion shows the water-level and seismicity rate are anti-correlated in this dam, which is explained by the stabilization effect of the gravitational induced stress imposed by water loading on the local faults. The overall effective stress in the seismogenic zone increased over decades due to pore-pressure diffusion, explaining the enhanced background seismicity during recent years.

== See also ==
- Nissibi Euphrates Bridge
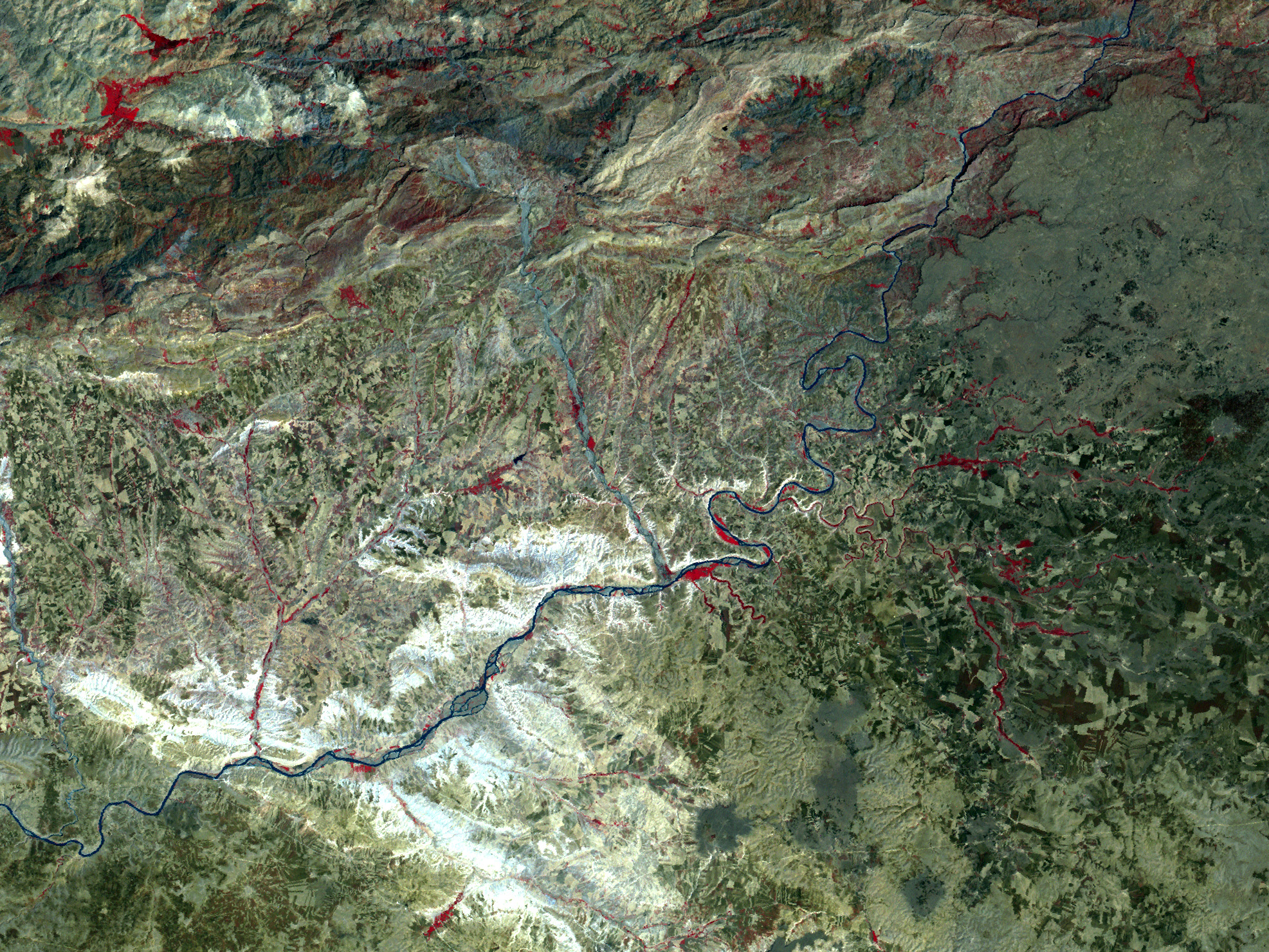
Landsat4 image of pre-Atatürk Dam, Harran (August 20, 1983)

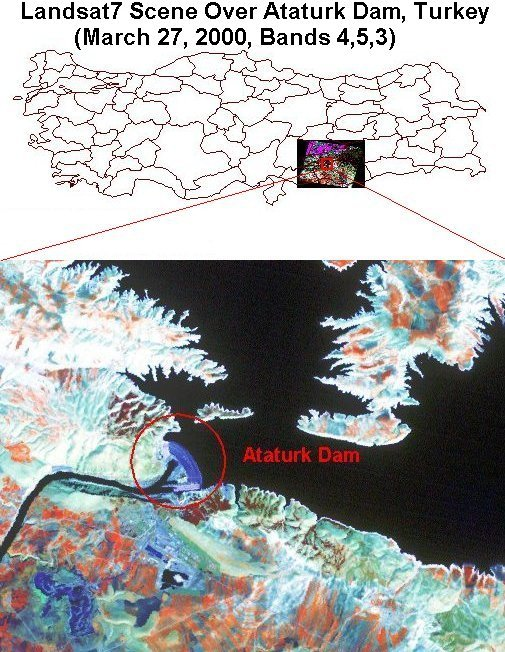
Landsat7 image of the Atatürk Dam (March 27, 2000)

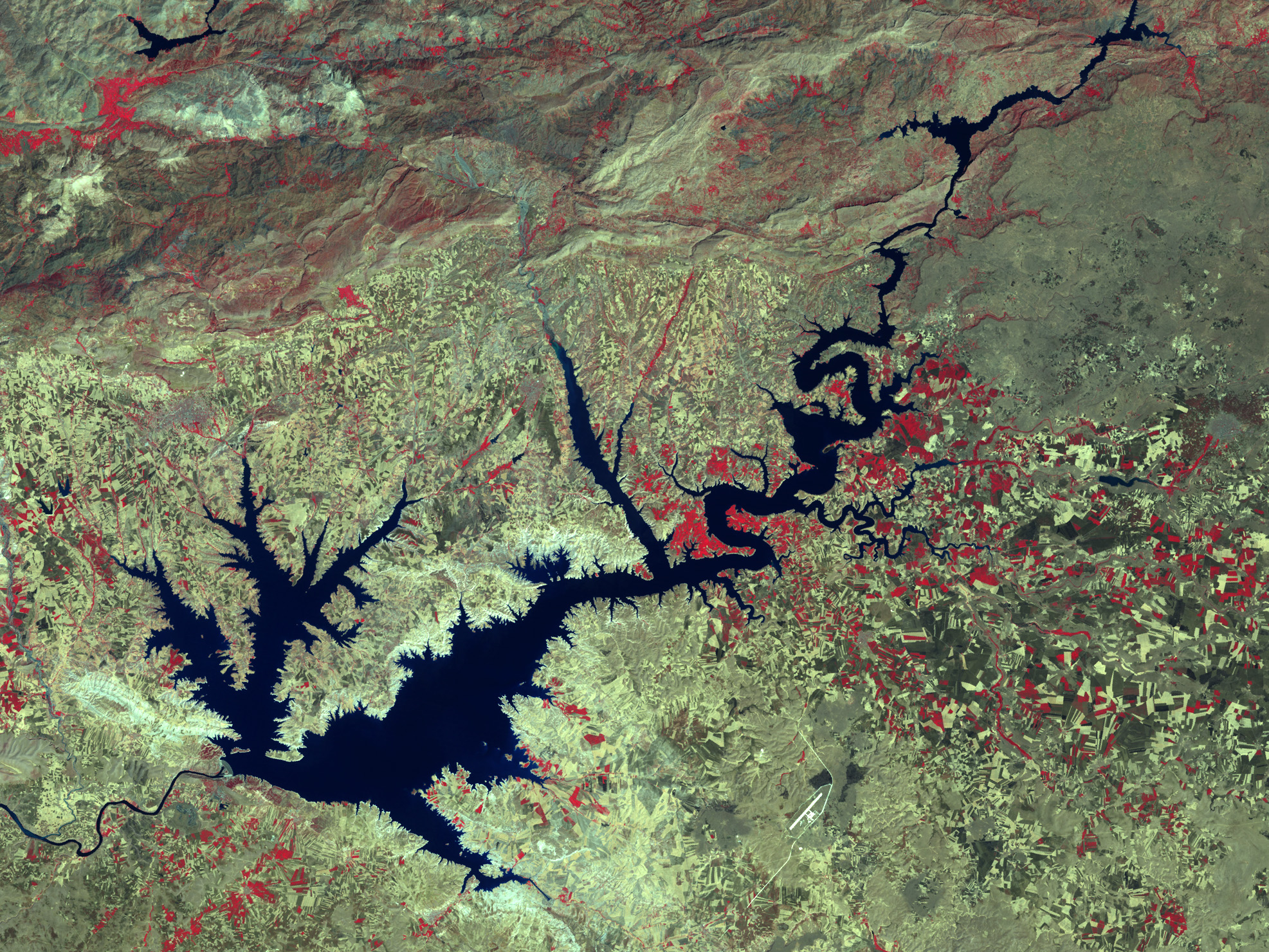
Landsat7 image of post-Atatürk Dam, Harran (August 24, 2002)
