= Ḫaḫḫum =

City in ancient Mesopotamia

Ḫaḫḫum, also known as Hahha, was a city in ancient Mesopotamia located near the Balikh river. Hahhum was located near a trade route. Its location has been suggested as on the West Bank of the Euphrates around the Eastern Taurus mountains. The site of Lidar Höyük has also been proposed.

== History ==
Ḫaḫḫum was a center of textile and wool in Anatolia. As well as gold for Sumeria. It was located near a trade route to the Assyrian city of Kaneš, which later became the Hittite city Neša, and is now the Turkish archaeological site known as Kültepe.

=== Relationship with Assur traders ===
During a period of unrest in the city sometime before 1835 BC (Kültepe level II), caused by a rebellion of unknown nature, the Assyrian merchants postponed all commercial activities. Rebellion was also reported in Burušhattum, Wahšušana, Ulama, Šalatuwar, and the land of Kunanamit. The main trade route from Aššur to Kaneš went through Ḫaḫḫum and Zalpa. When this main route was closed the lesser southern route through Uršu was used. One trade agreement between the city of Assur, Kaniš, and Ḫaḫḫum was discovered in Kültepe. The treaty laid out terms on the textile, lapis lazuli, iron, and silver trade. The treaty also provides protections for lost goods. If goods were lost, the state would be obligated to search for it. If the goods could not be found, the owner would be compensated. It also mentions that if an Assyrian's blood was spilt in Ḫaḫḫum then the city of Ḫaḫḫum was required to send the aggressor to Assyria where he would be executed. Other laws regarding Assyrians were mentioned in the text. It states that citizens could not covet an Assyrian's wealth and the state could not forcibly confiscate their wealth. Also, indebted Assyrians that left the city could not have their debt be repaid by any other persons and Assyrians could not be punished with hard labor. The treaty invoked the Assyrian deities as part of the oath.

=== Relationship with the Hittites ===
The city was conquered by Hittites during the reign of King Hattusili I (c. 1650–1620 BC). Hattiusili worked with the city of Tikunani to conquer Ḫaḫḫum as well as Ḫaššum during his Second Syrian Campaign.

== See also ==
- Cities of the Ancient Near East
- List of Mesopotamian deities
- List of Mesopotamian dynasties
