= List of populated places in Bayburt Province =

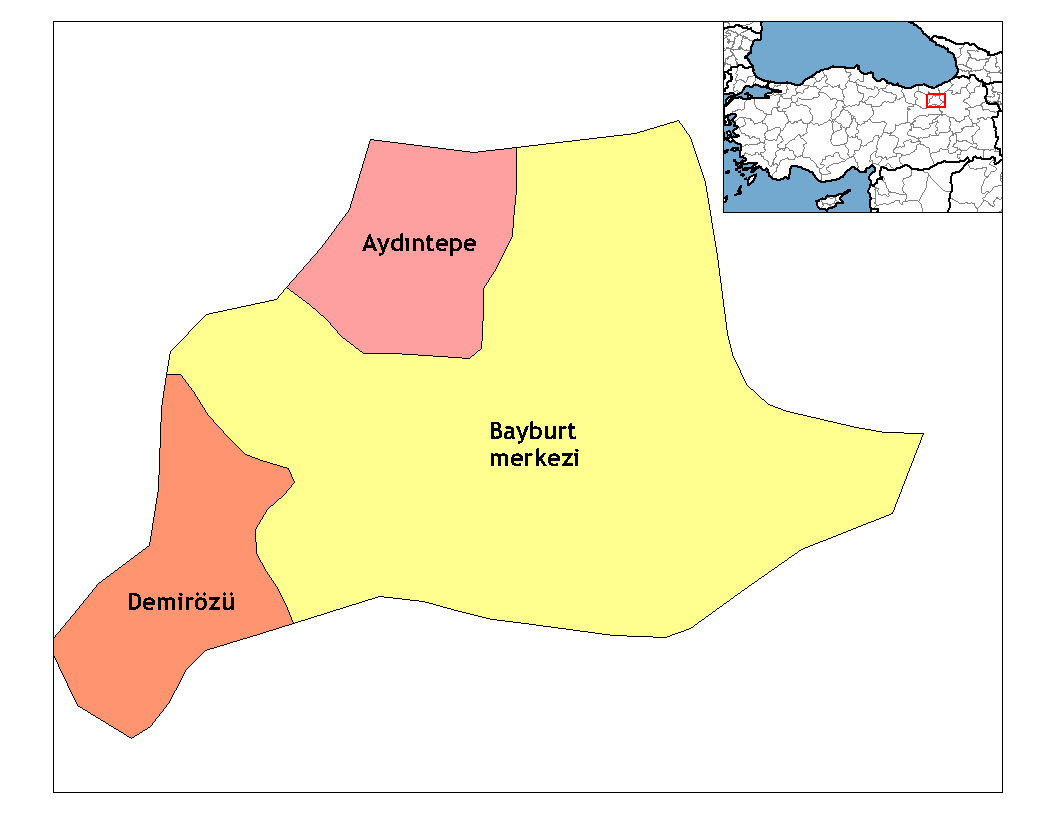
Bayburt Province

Below is the list of populated places in Bayburt Province, Turkey by the districts. In the following lists first place in each list is the administrative center of the district.

== Bayburt ==
- Bayburt
- Adabaşı, Bayburt
- Ağören, Bayburt
- Akçakuzu, Bayburt
- Akduran, Bayburt
- Aksaçlı, Bayburt
- Akşar, Bayburt
- Alapelit, Bayburt
- Alıçlık, Bayburt
- Ardıçgöze, Bayburt
- Armutlu, Bayburt
- Arpalı, Bayburt
- Arslandede, Bayburt
- Aşağıçımağıl, Bayburt
- Aşağıkışlak, Bayburt
- Aşağıpınarlı, Bayburt
- Aydıncık, Bayburt
- Balca, Bayburt
- Balkaynak, Bayburt
- Ballıkaya, Bayburt
- Başçımağıl, Bayburt
- Bayırtepe, Bayburt
- Bayraktar, Bayburt
- Buğdaylı, Bayburt
- Çakırbağ, Bayburt
- Çalıdere, Bayburt
- Çamdere, Bayburt
- Çamlıkoz, Bayburt
- Çayırözü, Bayburt
- Çayıryolu, Bayburt
- Çerçi, Bayburt
- Çiğdemtepe, Bayburt
- Çorak, Bayburt
- Dağçatı, Bayburt
- Dağtarla, Bayburt
- Danişment, Bayburt
- Darıca, Bayburt
- Değirmencik, Bayburt
- Demirışık, Bayburt
- Demirkaş, Bayburt
- Dikmetaş, Bayburt
- Dövmekaya, Bayburt
- Erenli, Bayburt
- Gençosman, Bayburt
- Gez, Bayburt
- Gökçeli, Bayburt
- Gökler, Bayburt
- Gökpınar, Bayburt
- Göldere, Bayburt
- Göloba, Bayburt
- Güder, Bayburt
- Güllüce, Bayburt
- Gümüşsu, Bayburt
- Güneydere, Bayburt
- Güzelce, Bayburt
- Hacıoğlu, Bayburt
- Harmanözü, Bayburt
- Helva, Bayburt
- Heybetepe, Bayburt
- Iğdır, Bayburt
- Kabaçayır, Bayburt
- Karlıca, Bayburt
- Karşıgeçit, Bayburt
- Kavacık, Bayburt
- Kavakyanı, Bayburt
- Kıratlı, Bayburt
- Kırkpınar, Bayburt
- Kitre, Bayburt
- Koçbayır, Bayburt
- Konursu, Bayburt
- Kop, Bayburt
- Kopuz, Bayburt
- Kozluk, Bayburt
- Kurbanpınar, Bayburt
- Kurugüney, Bayburt
- Maden, Bayburt
- Manas, Bayburt
- Masat, Bayburt
- Mutlu, Bayburt
- Nişantaşı, Bayburt
- Ortaçımağıl, Bayburt
- Oruçbeyli, Bayburt
- Ozansu, Bayburt
- Örence, Bayburt
- Pamuktaş, Bayburt
- Pelitli, Bayburt
- Petekkaya, Bayburt
- Polatlı, Bayburt
- Rüştü, Bayburt
- Sakızlı, Bayburt
- Salkımsu, Bayburt
- Sancaktepe, Bayburt
- Saraycık, Bayburt
- Sarıhan, Bayburt
- Sarımeşe, Bayburt
- Seydiyakup, Bayburt
- Sığırcı, Bayburt
- Sırakayalar, Bayburt
- Soğukgöze, Bayburt
- Söğütlü, Bayburt
- Taht, Bayburt
- Taşburun, Bayburt
- Taşçılar, Bayburt
- Taşkesen, Bayburt
- Taşocağı, Bayburt
- Tepetarla, Bayburt
- Tomlacık, Bayburt
- Uğrak, Bayburt
- Uğurgeldi, Bayburt
- Uluçayır, Bayburt
- Üzengili, Bayburt
- Yanıkçam, Bayburt
- Yaylalar, Bayburt
- Yaylapınar, Bayburt
- Yazyurdu, Bayburt
- Yedigöze, Bayburt
- Yeniköy, Bayburt
- Yerlice, Bayburt
- Yeşilyurt, Bayburt
- Yolaltı, Bayburt
- Yoncalı, Bayburt
- Yukarıkışlak, Bayburt

== Aydıntepe ==
- Aydıntepe
- Akbulut, Aydıntepe
- Alaca, Aydıntepe
- Aşağıkırzı, Aydıntepe
- Başpınar, Aydıntepe
- Çatıksu, Aydıntepe
- Çayırköprü, Aydıntepe
- Çiğdemlik, Aydıntepe
- Dumlu, Aydıntepe
- Erikdibi, Aydıntepe
- Gümüşdamla, Aydıntepe
- Günbuldu, Aydıntepe
- İncili, Aydıntepe
- Kavlatan, Aydıntepe
- Kılıçkaya, Aydıntepe
- Pınargözü, Aydıntepe
- Sırataşlar, Aydıntepe
- Sorkunlu, Aydıntepe
- Suludere, Aydıntepe
- Şalcılar, Aydıntepe
- Yanoba, Aydıntepe
- Yapracık, Aydıntepe
- Yazlık, Aydıntepe
- Yukarıkırzı, Aydıntepe

== Demirözü ==
- Demirözü
- Akyaka, Demirözü
- Bayrampaşa, Demirözü
- Beşpınar, Demirözü
- Çağıllı, Demirözü
- Çakırözü, Demirözü
- Çatalçeşme, Demirözü
- Çimentepe, Demirözü
- Damlıca, Demirözü
- Devetaşı, Demirözü
- Dikmetaş, Demirözü
- Elmalı, Demirözü
- Eymür, Demirözü
- Gökçedere, Demirözü
- Güçlü, Demirözü
- Güvercindere, Demirözü
- Işıkova, Demirözü
- Kalecik, Demirözü
- Karayaşmak, Demirözü
- Kavaklı, Demirözü
- Otlukbeli, Demirözü
- Petekli, Demirözü
- Pınarcık, Demirözü
- Serenli, Demirözü
- Yakupabdal, Demirözü
- Yazıbaşı, Demirözü
- Yelpınar, Demirözü
- Yukarıpınarlı, Demirözü
