= Gümüşhane-Bayburt Airport =

Gümüşhane Örenşar Airport Gümüşhane Örenşar Havalimanı
- IATA: ?; ICAO: ?

Summary
- Airport type: Public/civil
- Owner: DHMI
- Operator: State Airports Administration (Turkish: Devlet Hava Meydanları İşletmesi (DHMİ))
- Serves: Gümüşhane and Bayburt, Turkey
- Location: Köse, Gümüşhane, Turkey
- Elevation AMSL: 519 m / 1,704 ft
- Coordinates: 40°15′25″N 39°48′35″E

Map
- Location of airport in Turkey

Runways
Direction	Length		Surface
Direction	m	ft	Surface
07/25	3,000	9,843	Concrete

Gümüşhane Örenşar Airport (IATA: ?, ICAO: ?) (Turkish: Gümüşhane Örenşar Havalimanı) is a planned public airport at Örenşar village of Köse district in Gümüşhane, Türkiye. The airport is located 64 km (40 mi) away from Gümüşhane city centre.

The Gümüşhane Örenşar Airport is being re-developed on its current STOLport location that was built back in 1995. The runway is being extended from 1,113 m × 30 m (3,652 ft × 98 ft) to 3,000 m × 60 m (9,840 ft × 200 ft) on 07/25 direction. Despite the finished feasibility plans, the tender to build the airport has not been issued yet.

== Geography and transport ==
Airport is close to Örenşar, Salyazı, Bizgili, Gökçeköy, Yaylım, Bayrampaşa, Oylumdere, Çakıröz, Altıntaş, Özbeyli, Çatalçeşme, Kabaktepe, Eymür, Yuvacık, Çayıryolu, Yenice, Kitre, Manas, Tomlacık, Beyçam, Kocayokuş, Karayaşmak, Övünce, Nazlıçayır, Güvercindere, Çalık, and Çerçi villages; Gökçedere, Öbektaş, Arzularkabaköy, Tekke, Arpalı, and Ünlüpınar towns; Demirözü, Köse, Kelkit, Otlukbeli, and Aydıntepe district centers.

The routes from the airport to nearby cities are these:

To Bayburt (based on the Bayburt University Bâberti Complex)

- (38 km., 41 min.) D052 (Bayburt direction)
- (40 km., 50 min.) D052 (Bayburt direction) - Çayıryolu - Tomlacık - Rüştü - 69-50 (Bayburt direction) - D052 (Bayburt direction)
- (41 km., 53 min.) D052 (Bayburt direction) - Kırkpınar locality - Danişment - D052 (Bayburt direction)
- (48 km., 57 min.) D052 (Bayburt direction) - 29-34 (Demirözü direction) - 69-54 (Demirözü direction) - Çatalçeşme - Demirözü - 69-50 (Bayburt direction) - D052 (Bayburt direction)
- (60 km., 63 min.) D052 (Bayburt direction) - Salyazı Pond - Salyazı - Kırklar Cave (Altıntaş) - Kocayokuş - D050 (Bayburt direction) - Korgan Bridge (Akşar) - D052 (Köse direction)
- (61 km., 61 min.) D052 (Bayburt direction) - 29-31 (Kitre, Çerçi direction) - D050 (Bayburt direction) - Korgan Bridge (Akşar) - D052 (Köse direction)

To Gümüşhane (based on the Gümüşhane University Library)

- (48 km., 58 min.) D052 (Bayburt direction) - Salyazı Pond - Salyazı - Kırklar Cave (Altıntaş) - Yenice - Beyçam - D050 (Gümüşhane direction, opposite side) - Tohumoğlu Bridge (Yeniyol) - D885 (Gümüşhane direction) - Çağırgan Baba Tomb (Tekke) - 29-01 (city center direction)
- (51 km., 59 min.) D052 (Bayburt direction) - Salyazı Pond - Salyazı - Kırklar Cave (Altıntaş) - Yenice - Nazlıçayır - Sargınkaya - D050 (Gümüşhane direction, opposite side) - Keçi Castle (Kale) - Tohumoğlu Bridge (Yeniyol) - D885 (Gümüşhane direction) - Çağırgan Baba Tomb (Tekke) - 29-01 (city center direction)
- (52 km., 63 min.) D052 (Köse direction) - Yaylım Church - Beyçam - D050 (Gümüşhane direction, opposite side) - Tohumoğlu Bridge (Yeniyol) - D885 (Gümüşhane direction) - Çağırgan Baba Tomb (Tekke) - 29-01 (city center direction)
- (52 km., 73 min.) D052 (Bayburt direction) - Salyazı Pond - Salyazı - Kırklar Cave (Altıntaş) - Yenice - Nazlıçayır - Tamzı - Keçikaya - Kale - D050 (Gümüşhane direction, opposite side) - Keçi Castle (Kale) - 29-25 (Yağmurdere direction) - Harmancık - D885 (Gümüşhane direction) - Çağırgan Baba Tomb (Tekke) - 29-01 (city center direction)
- (53 km., 58 min.) D052 (Köse direction) - Köse - D885 (Gümüşhane direction) - Köse Dam Lake - Sungurbeyli Plateau - Pirahmet Tomb - Çağırgan Baba Tomb (Tekke) - 29-01 (city center direction)
- (54 km., 61 min.) D052 (Bayburt direction) - Salyazı Pond - Salyazı - Kırklar Cave (Altıntaş) - Kocayokuş - D050 (Gümüşhane direction, opposite side) - Keçi Castle (Kale) - Tohumoğlu Bridge (Yeniyol) - D885 (Gümüşhane direction) - Çağırgan Baba Tomb (Tekke) - 29-01 (city center direction)
- (60 km., 62 min.) D052 (Bayburt direction) - 29-31 (Kitre, Çerçi direction) - D050 (Gümüşhane direction, opposite side) - Keçi Castle (Kale) - Tohumoğlu Bridge (Yeniyol) - D885 (Gümüşhane direction) - Çağırgan Baba Tomb (Tekke) - 29-01 (city center direction)
