= Dikmetaş =

Dikmetaş can refer to:

- Dikmetaş, Bayburt
- Dikmetaş, Demirözü
- Dikmetaş, Pazaryolu
