= Varzahan Monastery =

Former Armenian Monastery in Turkey

Varzahan
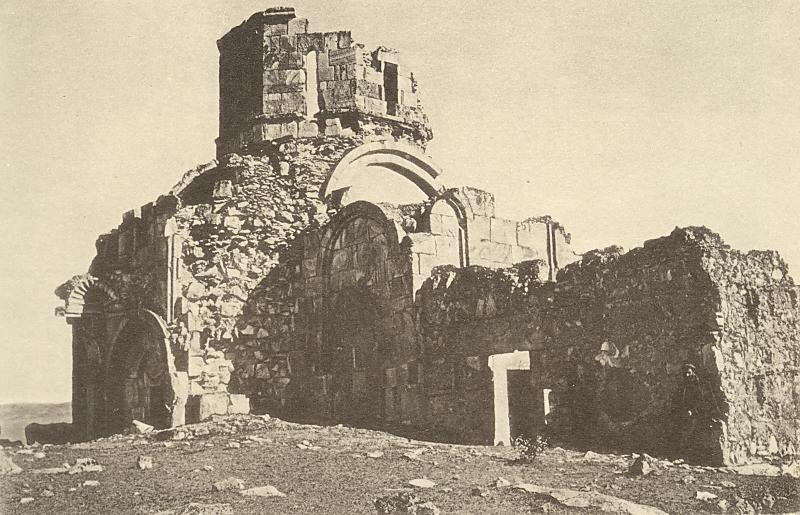
- Varzahan Monastery in 1911.

- Location within Turkey

Religion
- Affiliation: Armenian Apostolic Church
- Status: demolished sometime between the 1920s and the mid-1950s

Location
- Location: near Uğrak village
- Coordinates: 40.333333°N 40.116667°E

Architecture
- Style: Armenian
- Completed: 12th century

Varzahan (Armenian: Վարզահան վանք, Turkish: Uğrak Kiliseleri or Varzahan Kiliseleri), was an Armenian church founded in the 12th century near village Uğrak (formerly Varzahan), 10 km northwest of Bayburt, in eastern Turkey. After the Armenian genocide in 1915, it was demolished sometime between the 1920s and the mid-1950s.

== History ==
Situated in a settlement called Varzahan in Upper Armenia province of Historical Armenia's northern part. Varzahan was a large Armenian settlement in a 5.7 miles northwest to the Baberd city (now Bayburt) of a northernmost district of Upper Armenia called Sper. Most of its population was massacred by Turks during the 18th century. The monastery was damaged in the same period.

The archaeologist Austin Henry Layard has described this place in 1849 while travelling from Trebizond to Mosul. Austin Henry Layard said:
---The only place of any interest, passed during our ride, was a small Armenian village, the remains of a larger, with the ruins of three early Christian churches, or Baptisteries.---

== Gallery ==
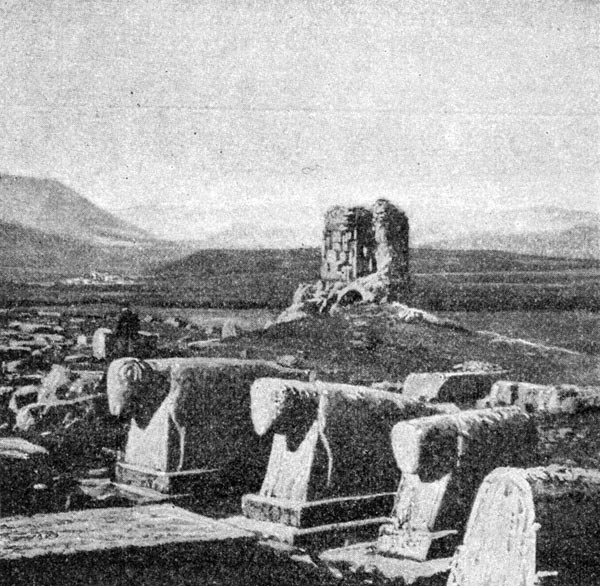
Lynch's 1898 photograph of the graveyard.

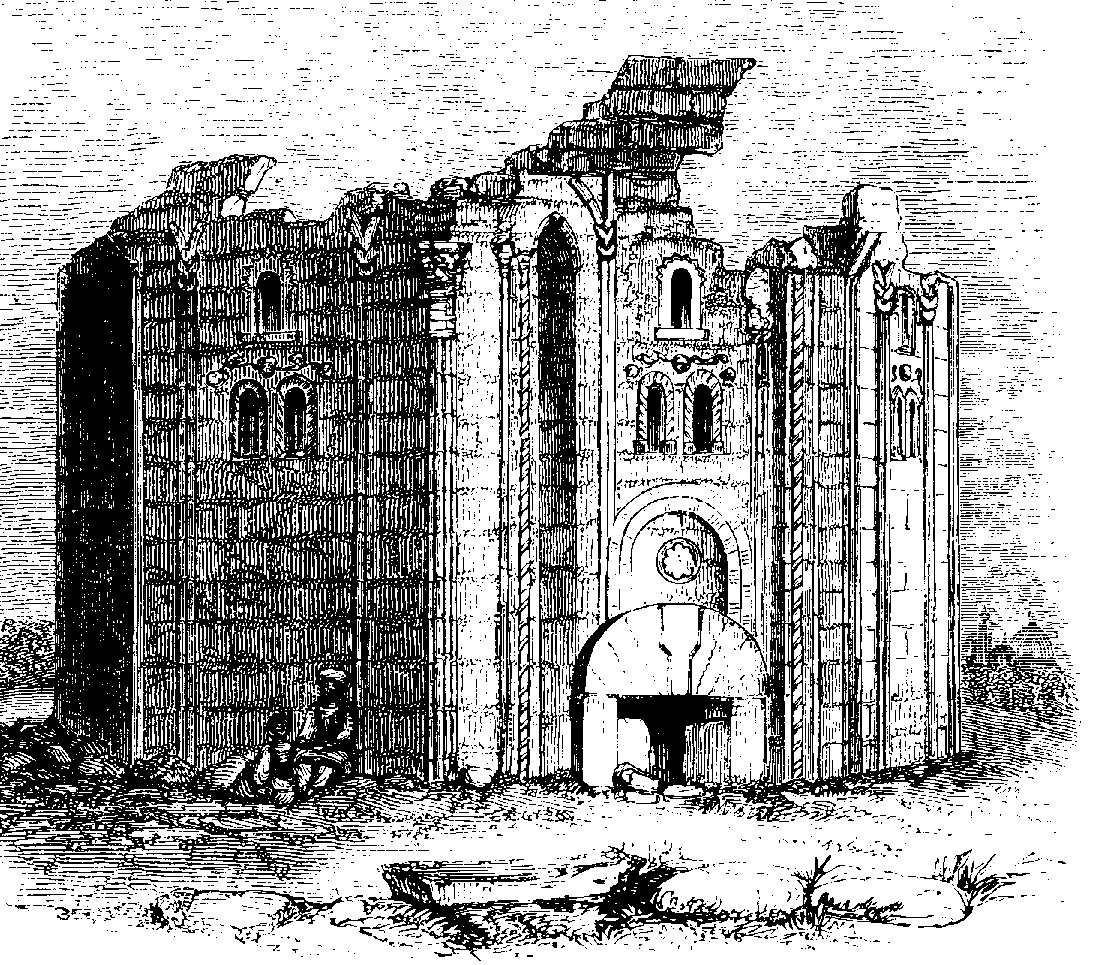
A drawing of one of the churches.

== Ruines d'eglise Georgienes ==
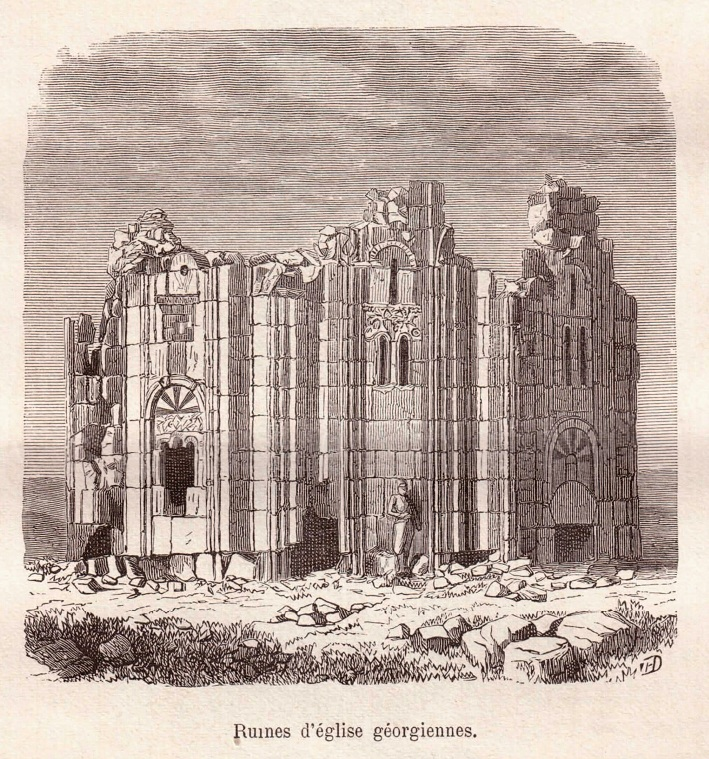
Théophile Deyrolle "Ruines d'eglise Georgienes".

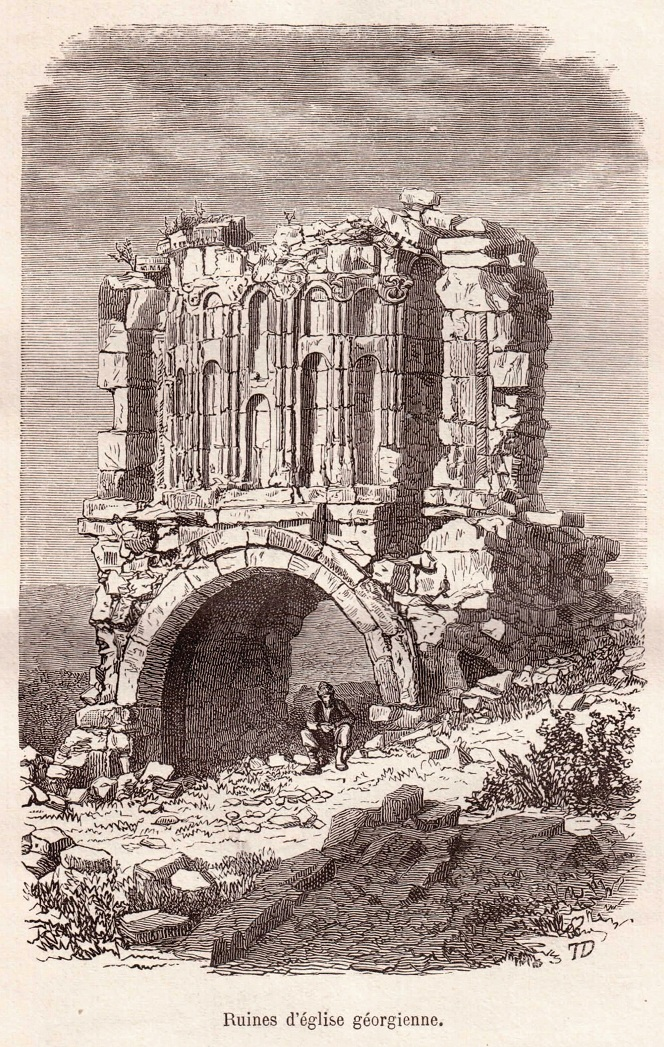
Théophile Deyrolle "Ruines d'eglise Georgienes".

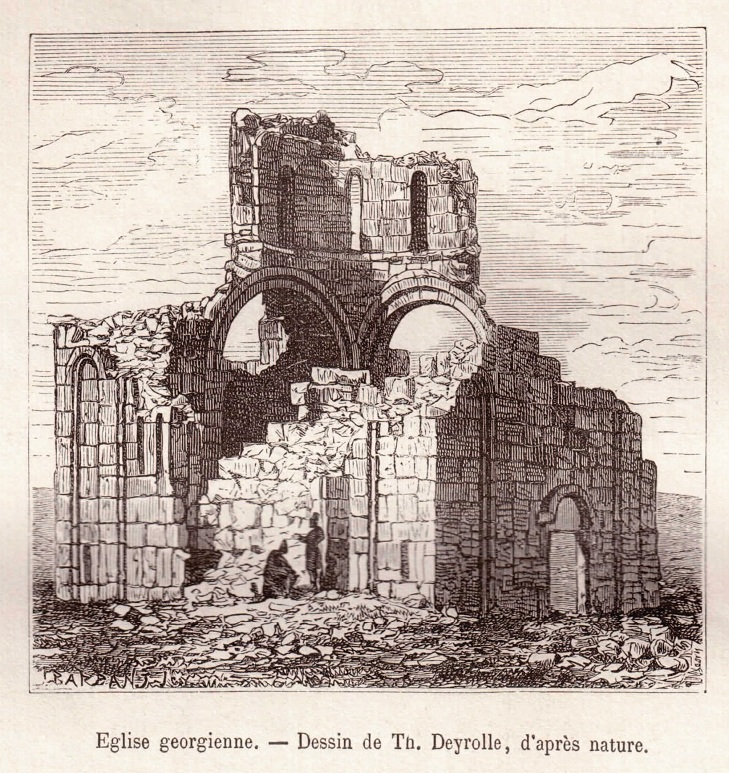
Théophile Deyrolle "Eglise Georgiene".

== See also ==
- Bayburt
