= Çamdere =

Çamdere may refer to the following places in Turkey:

- Çamdere, Bayburt
- Çamdere, Kozan
- Çamdere, Sincik
