= Uluçayır =

Uluçayır can refer to:

- Uluçayır, Bayburt
- Uluçayır, Hınıs
