= Sarıhan =

Sarıhan can refer to:

- Sarıhan, Bayburt
- Sarıhan, Karakoçan
