= Yolaltı =

Yolaltı (literally "below the road" in Turkish) may refer to the following places in Turkey:

- Yolaltı, Bayburt, a village in the district of Bayburt, Bayburt Province
- Yolaltı, Kahta, a village in the district of Kahta, Adıyaman Province
- Yolaltı, Karacasu, a village in the district of Karacasu, Aydın Province
