= Kıratlı =

Kıratlı may refer to the following settlements in Turkey:

- Kıratlı, Bayburt, a village in Bayburt Province
- Kıratlı, Dikili, a neighbourhood in İzmir Province
- Kıratlı, Kozluk, formerly Yukarıkıratlı, a village in Batman Province
- Kıratlı, Nizip, historically Kertişe, a village in Gaziantep Province
