= Soğukgöze =

Soğukgöze can refer to:

- Soğukgöze, Bayburt
- Soğukgöze, Olur
