= Ballıkaya =

Ballıkaya can refer to:

- Ballıkaya, Bayburt
- Ballıkaya, Karacabey
