= Tepetarla =

Tepetarla may refer to:

- Örnekköy, a village in Beykoz district of Istanbul Province, Turkey
- Tepetarla, Bayburt, a village in the District of Bayburt, Bayburt Province, Turkey
