= Göldere =

Göldere can refer to:

- Göldere, Bayburt
- Göldere, Keban
