= Masat =

Masat may refer to:

- Masat, Bayburt, a village in Bayburt district, Bayburt Province, Turkey
- Maşat Höyük, an archaeological site in Tokat Province, north-central Turkey
- Masat, Hooghly, a census town, in Hooghly district, West Bengal, India
- Masat, Diamond Harbour, a census town in South 24 Parganas district, West Bengal, India
- MaSat-1, Hungarian satellite, developed and built by students at the Technical University of Budapest
