= Helva =

Helva may refer to:

- Halva, a dense and sweet confection
- Helva, Bayburt, a village in Turkey
- cognomen of gens Aebutia
