= Aydıncık =

Aydıncık is a Turkish place name and may refer to:

- Aydıncık, Mersin, a town and district of Mersin Province
- Aydıncık, Yozgat, a town and district of Yozgat Province
- Aydıncık, Bayburt, a village in Bayburt Province
- Aydıncık, Bolu, a village in Bolu Province
- Aydıncık, Elâzığ
- Aydıncık, Gazipaşa, a village in Antalya Province
- Aydıncık, Refahiye
- Aydıncık, Yüreğir, a village in Adana Province
- Cyzicus, an ancient town, today in Balıkesir Province
