= Demirışık =

Demirışık (Turkish: "ironlight") may refer to the following places in Turkey:

- Demirışık, Bayburt, a village in the district of Bayburt, Bayburt Province
- Demirışık, Mezitli, a village in the district of Mezitli, Mersin Province
