= Ağören =

Ağören can refer to:

- Ağören, Bayburt
- Ağören, Tercan
