= Buğdaylı =

Buğdaylı can refer to:

- Buğdaylı, Bayburt
- Buğdaylı, Erzincan
- Buğdaylı, Köprüköy
