= Taşburun, Bayburt =

Taşburun
- Village
- Location within Turkey
- Country: Turkey
- Province: Bayburt
- District: Bayburt
- Population (2021): 55
- Time zone: UTC+3 (TRT)

Taşburun is a village in the Bayburt District, Bayburt Province, Turkey. Its population is 55 (2021).
