= Yazyurdu, Bayburt =

Yazyurdu
- Village
- Location within Turkey
- Coordinates: 40°25′38″N 40°28′00″E
- Country: Turkey
- Province: Bayburt
- District: Bayburt
- Population (2021): 258
- Time zone: UTC+3 (TRT)

Yazyurdu is a village in the Bayburt District, Bayburt Province, Turkey. Its population is 258 (2021).
