= Pamuktaş, Bayburt =

Pamuktaş
- village
- Location within Turkey
- Coordinates: 40°24′42″N 39°58′1″E
- Country: Turkey
- Province: Bayburt
- District: Bayburt

Population (2021)
  - Total: 122

Pamuktaş is a village in the Bayburt District, Bayburt Province, Turkey. Its population is 122 (2021).
