= Gençosman, Bayburt =

Gençosman
- Village
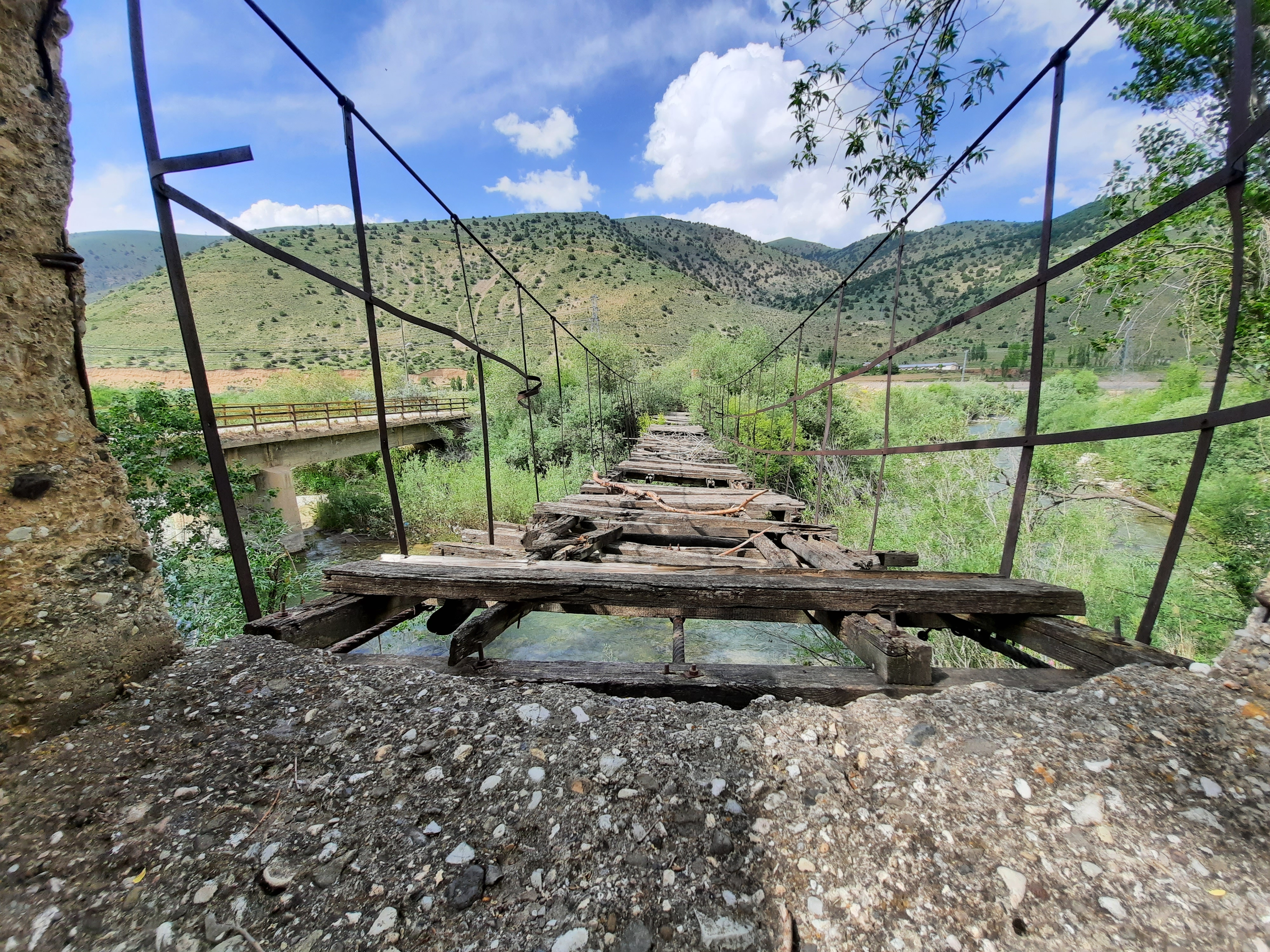
- Eski Asma Bridge in Gençosman

- Location within Turkey
- Country: Turkey
- Province: Bayburt
- District: Bayburt
- Population (2021): 266
- Time zone: UTC+3 (TRT)

Gençosman is a village in the Bayburt District, Bayburt Province, Turkey. Its population is 266 (2021).
