= Taht, Bayburt =

Taht
- Village
- Location within Turkey
- Coordinates: 40.2872°N 40.4288°E
- Country: Turkey
- Province: Bayburt
- District: Bayburt
- Population (2021): 163
- Time zone: UTC+3 (TRT)

Taht (also: Tahtköy) is a village in the Bayburt District, Bayburt Province, Turkey. Its population is 163 (2021).
