= Adabaşı, Bayburt =

Adabaşı
- Village
- Location within Turkey
- Coordinates: 40°23′N 40°20′E
- Country: Turkey
- Province: Bayburt
- District: Bayburt
- Population (2021): 430
- Time zone: UTC+3 (TRT)

Adabaşı is a village in the Bayburt District, Bayburt Province, Turkey. Its population is 430 (2021).

== History ==
The former name of the village was İşbonos.
