= Kavacık, Bayburt =

Kavacık
- Village
- Location within Turkey
- Country: Turkey
- Province: Bayburt
- District: Bayburt
- Population (2021): 68
- Time zone: UTC+3 (TRT)

Kavacık is a village in the Bayburt District, Bayburt Province, Turkey. Its population is 68 (2021).
