= Sancaktepe, Bayburt =

Sancaktepe
- Village
- Location within Turkey
- Country: Turkey
- Province: Bayburt
- District: Bayburt
- Population (2021): 238
- Time zone: UTC+3 (TRT)

Sancaktepe is a village in the Bayburt District, Bayburt Province, Turkey. Its population is 238 (2021).
