= Kurugüney, Bayburt =

Kurugüney
- Village
- Location within Turkey
- Coordinates: 40°07′N 40°03′E
- Country: Turkey
- Province: Bayburt
- District: Bayburt
- Population (2021): 61
- Time zone: UTC+3 (TRT)

Kurugüney is a village in the Bayburt District, Bayburt Province, Turkey. Its population is 61 (2021).
