= Göloba, Bayburt =

Göloba
- Village
- Location within Turkey
- Coordinates: 40°29′N 40°20′E
- Country: Turkey
- Province: Bayburt
- District: Bayburt
- Population (2021): 60
- Time zone: UTC+3 (TRT)

Göloba is a village in the Bayburt District, Bayburt Province, Turkey. Its population is 60 (2021).
