= Kabaçayır, Bayburt =

Kabaçayır
- Village
- Location within Turkey
- Coordinates: 40°12′N 40°10′E
- Country: Turkey
- Province: Bayburt
- District: Bayburt
- Population (2021): 187
- Time zone: UTC+3 (TRT)

Kabaçayır is a village in the Bayburt District, Bayburt Province, Turkey. Its population is 187 (2021).
