= Aydıncık, Bayburt =

Aydıncık
- Village
- Location within Turkey
- Coordinates: 40°21′26″N 40°18′52″E
- Country: Turkey
- Province: Bayburt
- District: Bayburt
- Time zone: UTC+3 (TRT)

Aydıncık, commonly known as Malasa, is a village in Bayburt District, Bayburt Province, Turkey. It is about 20 kilometers from Bayburt city center. The village is surrounded by the neighboring villages of Dikmetaş, Yedigöze, Adabaşı, and Buğdaylı. Its location is not on main roads, but the Bayburt-İspir Yolu has a junction connecting Aydıncık to the other villages and the Bayburt city center.

== Climate ==
Aydıncık village has typical steppe climate. Although Bayburt Province is in Black Sea Region, climate is not affected by Black Sea due to high mountains parallel to the coast line.

== Population ==
Today, most of the Aydıncık people live in Istanbul, and abroad namely in Germany and other western European countries. According to Turkish Statistical Institute (2021), the population of Aydıncık village is 90 people.

== Economy ==
The economy of Aydıncık primarily depends on agricultural activities. Mostly cereals and very limited amounts of sugar beet, fruits, and vegetables are cultivated. Cows, sheep, and poultry are raised in ranches.

== Infrastructure ==
There is a fresh water network. The road between the village center and Bayburt-İspir Yolu is asphalted. A minibus service is provided as a roundtrip to Bayburt city center and other villages surrounding it. There is no post office (PTT (Turkey)|PTT) in the village. Electricity is provided to the wall plugs with 220 V. Lighting between the village and Bayburt-İspir Yolu is currently unavailable.
