= Hacıoğlu, Bayburt =

Hacıoğlu
- Village
- Location within Turkey
- Coordinates: 40.12616°N 40.22431°E
- Country: Turkey
- Province: Bayburt
- District: Bayburt
- Population (2021): 96
- Time zone: UTC+3 (TRT)

Hacıoğlu is a village in the Bayburt District, Bayburt Province, Turkey. Its population is 96 (2021).
