= Arslandede, Bayburt =

Arslandede
- Village
- Location within Turkey
- Coordinates: 40°23′N 40°28′E
- Country: Turkey
- Province: Bayburt
- District: Bayburt
- Population (2021): 149
- Time zone: UTC+3 (TRT)

Arslandede is a village in the Bayburt District, Bayburt Province, Turkey. Its population is 149 (2021).
