= Kavakyanı, Bayburt =

Kavakyanı
- Village
- Location within Turkey
- Coordinates: 40°17′N 40°31′E
- Country: Turkey
- Province: Bayburt
- District: Bayburt
- Population (2021): 51
- Time zone: UTC+3 (TRT)

Kavakyanı is a village in the Bayburt District, Bayburt Province, Turkey. Its population is 51 (2021).
