= Bayraktar, Bayburt =

Bayraktar
- Village
- Location within Turkey
- Coordinates: 40.3873°N 40.5768°E
- Country: Turkey
- Province: Bayburt
- District: Bayburt
- Population (2021): 217
- Time zone: UTC+3 (TRT)

Bayraktar is a village in the Bayburt District, Bayburt Province, Turkey. Its population is 217 (2021).
