= Yeşilyurt, Bayburt =

Yeşilyurt
- Village
- Location within Turkey
- Country: Turkey
- Province: Bayburt
- District: Bayburt
- Population (2021): 391
- Time zone: UTC+3 (TRT)

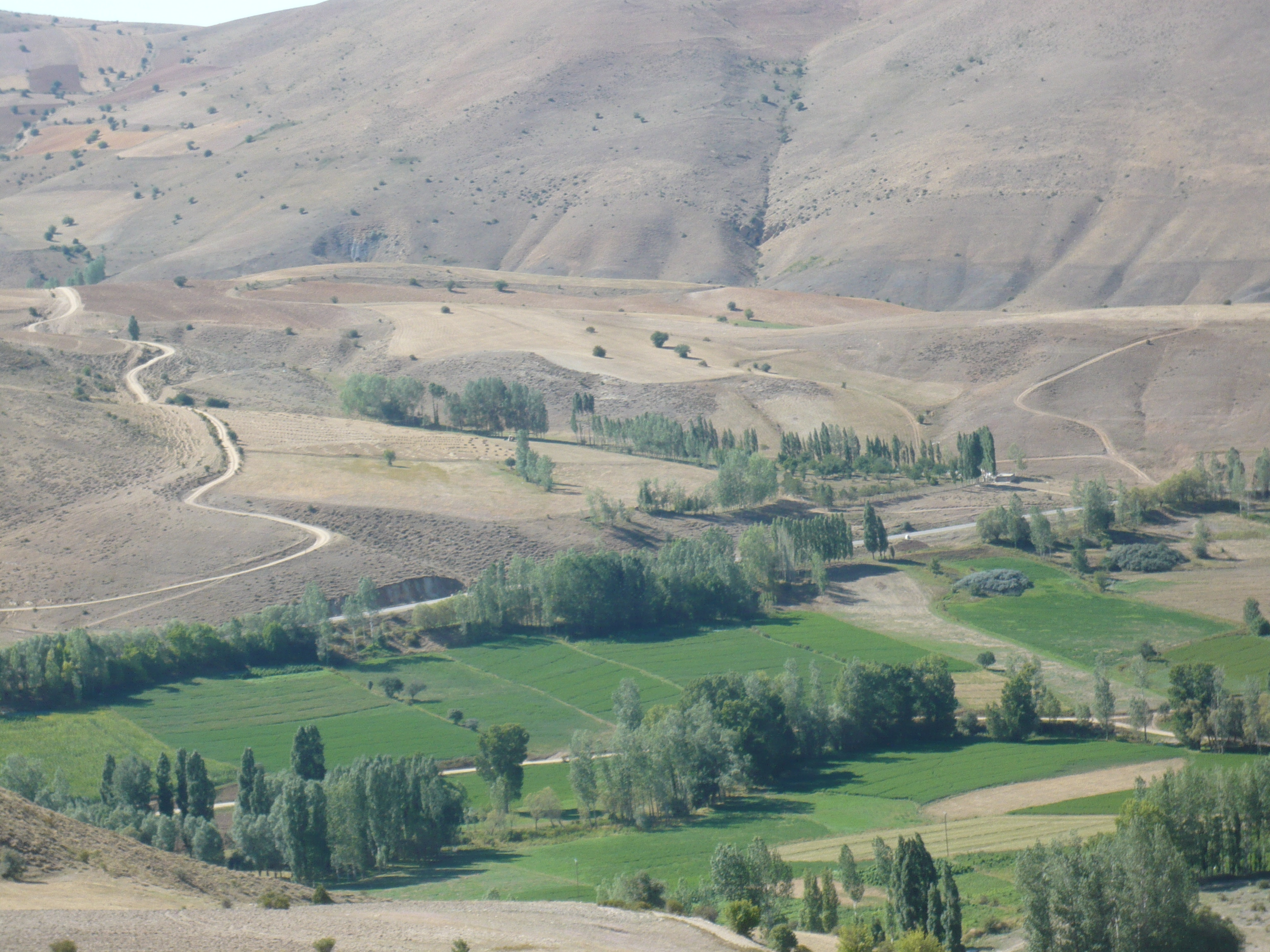
Monastery Plain in Yeşilyurt

Yeşilyurt is a village in the Bayburt District, Bayburt Province, Turkey. Its population is 391 (2021).
