= Sığırcı, Bayburt =

Sığırcı
- Village
- Country: Turkey
- Province: Bayburt
- District: Bayburt
- Population (2021): 116
- Time zone: UTC+3 (TRT)

Sığırcı is a village in the Bayburt District, Bayburt Province, Turkey. Its population is 116 (2021).
