= Gümüşsu, Bayburt =

Gümüşsu
- Village
- Location within Turkey
- Coordinates: 40.2247°N 40.3041°E
- Country: Turkey
- Province: Bayburt
- District: Bayburt
- Population (2021): 151
- Time zone: UTC+3 (TRT)

Gümüşsu is a village in the Bayburt District, Bayburt Province, Turkey. Its population is 151 (2021).
