= Gökpınar, Bayburt =

Gökpınar
- Village
- Location within Turkey
- Coordinates: 40.2256°N 40.2061°E
- Country: Turkey
- Province: Bayburt
- District: Bayburt
- Population (2021): 41
- Time zone: UTC+3 (TRT)

Gökpınar is a village in the Bayburt District, Bayburt Province, Turkey. Its population is 41 (2021).
