= Çamlıkoz, Bayburt =

Çamlıkoz
- Village
- Location within Turkey
- Coordinates: 40°23′N 40°32′E
- Country: Turkey
- Province: Bayburt
- District: Bayburt
- Population (2021): 150
- Time zone: UTC+3 (TRT)

Çamlıkoz is a village in the Bayburt District, Bayburt Province, Turkey. Its population is 150 (2021).
