= Harmanözü, Bayburt =

Harmanözü
- Village
- Location within Turkey
- Coordinates: 40°10′N 40°18′E
- Country: Turkey
- Province: Bayburt
- District: Bayburt
- Population (2021): 127
- Time zone: UTC+3 (TRT)

Harmanözü is a village in the Bayburt District, Bayburt Province, Turkey. Its population is 127 (2021).
