= Ardıçgöze, Bayburt =

Ardıçgöze
- Village
- Location within Turkey
- Coordinates: 40°29′N 40°21′E
- Country: Turkey
- Province: Bayburt
- District: Bayburt
- Population (2021): 68
- Time zone: UTC+3 (TRT)

Ardıçgöze is a village in the Bayburt District, Bayburt Province, Turkey. Its population is 68 (2021).

== History ==
The former name of the village was Korkosor.
