= Koçbayır, Bayburt =

Koçbayır
- Village
- Location within Turkey
- Coordinates: 40°28′N 40°20′E
- Country: Turkey
- Province: Bayburt
- District: Bayburt
- Population (2021): 101
- Time zone: UTC+3 (TRT)

Koçbayır is a village in the Bayburt District, Bayburt Province, Turkey. Its population is 101 as of 2021.
