= Alapelit, Bayburt =

Alapelit
- Village
- Location within Turkey
- Coordinates: 40°19′N 40°31′E
- Country: Turkey
- Province: Bayburt
- District: Bayburt
- Population (2021): 170
- Time zone: UTC+3 (TRT)

Alapelit is a village in the Bayburt District, Bayburt Province, Turkey. Its population is 170 (2021).

== History ==
The former name of the village was Pazahpun/Pazahbun.
