= Ozansu, Bayburt =

Ozansu
- Village
- Location within Turkey
- Coordinates: 40°05′N 40°00′E
- Country: Turkey
- Province: Bayburt
- District: Bayburt
- Population (2021): 155
- Time zone: UTC+3 (TRT)

Ozansu is a village in the Bayburt District, Bayburt Province, Turkey. Its population is 155 (2021).
