= Yedigöze, Bayburt =

Yedigöze
- Village
- Location within Turkey
- Coordinates: 40°21′54″N 40°20′54″E
- Country: Turkey
- Province: Bayburt
- District: Bayburt
- Population (2021): 105
- Time zone: UTC+3 (TRT)

Yedigöze is a village in the Bayburt District, Bayburt Province, Turkey. Its population is 105 (2021).
