= Akduran, Bayburt =

Akduran
- Village
- Location within Turkey
- Coordinates: 40°07′N 40°29′E
- Country: Turkey
- Province: Bayburt
- District: Bayburt
- Population (2021): 55
- Time zone: UTC+3 (TRT)

Akduran is a village in the Bayburt District, Bayburt Province, Turkey. Its population is 55 (2021).

== History ==
The former name of the village was Erkeli.
