= Çorak, Bayburt =

Çorak
- Village
- Location within Turkey
- Coordinates: 40.2548°N 39.9745°E
- Country: Turkey
- Province: Bayburt
- District: Bayburt
- Population (2021): 85
- Time zone: UTC+3 (TRT)

Çorak is a village in the Bayburt District, Bayburt Province, Turkey. Its population is 85 (2021).
