= Karlıca, Bayburt =

Karlıca
- Village
- Location within Turkey
- Country: Turkey
- Province: Bayburt
- District: Bayburt
- Population (2021): 74
- Time zone: UTC+3 (TRT)

Karlıca is a village in the Bayburt District, Bayburt Province, Turkey. Its population is 74 (2021).
