= Balca, Bayburt =

Balca
- Village
- Location within Turkey
- Coordinates: 40.1814°N 40.1731°E
- Country: Turkey
- Province: Bayburt
- District: Bayburt
- Population (2021): 295
- Time zone: UTC+3 (TRT)

Balca is a village in the Bayburt District, Bayburt Province, Turkey. Its population is 295 (2021).
