= Gökçeli, Bayburt =

Gökçeli
- Village
- Location within Turkey
- Coordinates: 40°25′22″N 40°20′04″E
- Country: Turkey
- Province: Bayburt
- District: Bayburt
- Population (2021): 50
- Time zone: UTC+3 (TRT)

Gökçeli is a village in the Bayburt District, Bayburt Province, Turkey. Its population is 50 (2021).
