= Sırakayalar, Bayburt =

Sırakayalar
- Village
- Location within Turkey
- Coordinates: 40°06′N 40°14′E
- Country: Turkey
- Province: Bayburt
- District: Bayburt
- Population (2021): 102
- Time zone: UTC+3 (TRT)

Sırakayalar is a village in the Bayburt District, Bayburt Province, Turkey. Its population is 102 (2021).
