= Bayırtepe, Bayburt =

Bayırtepe
- Village
- Location within Turkey
- Coordinates: 40°17′N 40°02′E
- Country: Turkey
- Province: Bayburt
- District: Bayburt
- Population (2021): 128
- Time zone: UTC+3 (TRT)

Bayırtepe is a village in the Bayburt District, Bayburt Province, Turkey. Its population is 128 (2021).
