= Kozluk, Bayburt =

Kozluk
- Village
- Location within Turkey
- Country: Turkey
- Province: Bayburt
- District: Bayburt
- Population (2021): 138
- Time zone: UTC+3 (TRT)

Kozluk is a village in the Bayburt District, Bayburt Province, Turkey. Its population is 138 (2021).
