= Demirkaş, Bayburt =

Demirkaş
- Village
- Location within Turkey
- Coordinates: 40°05′N 40°21′E
- Country: Turkey
- Province: Bayburt
- District: Bayburt
- Population (2021): 181
- Time zone: UTC+3 (TRT)

Demirkaş is a village in the Bayburt District, Bayburt Province, Turkey. Its population is 181 (2021).
