= Armutlu, Bayburt =

Armutlu
- Village
- Location within Turkey
- Coordinates: 40.4844°N 40.3633°E
- Country: Turkey
- Province: Bayburt
- District: Bayburt
- Population (2021): 113
- Time zone: UTC+3 (TRT)

Armutlu is a village in the Bayburt District, Bayburt Province, Turkey. Its population is 113 (2021).

== History ==
Throughout history the village was known with its current name only with a slight difference as it was written as Armudlu.
