= Mutlu, Bayburt =

Mutlu
- Village
- Location within Turkey
- Coordinates: 40.2134°N 40.1401°E
- Country: Turkey
- Province: Bayburt
- District: Bayburt
- Population (2021): 416
- Time zone: UTC+3 (TRT)

Mutlu is a village in the Bayburt District, Bayburt Province, Turkey. Its population is 416 (2021).
