= Balkaynak, Bayburt =

Balkaynak
- Village
- Location within Turkey
- Coordinates: 40.3549°N 39.9066°E
- Country: Turkey
- Province: Bayburt
- District: Bayburt
- Population (2021): 74
- Time zone: UTC+3 (TRT)

Balkaynak is a village in the Bayburt District, Bayburt Province, Turkey. Its population is 74 (2021).
