= Yoncalı, Bayburt =

Yoncalı
- Village
- Location within Turkey
- Coordinates: 40°29′39″N 40°33′44″E
- Country: Turkey
- Province: Bayburt
- District: Bayburt
- Population (2021): 267
- Time zone: UTC+3 (TRT)

Yoncalı is a village in the Bayburt District, Bayburt Province, Turkey. Its population is 267 (2021).
