= Örence, Bayburt =

Örence
- Village
- Location within Turkey
- Coordinates: 40°07′N 40°23′E
- Country: Turkey
- Province: Bayburt
- District: Bayburt
- Population (2021): 587
- Time zone: UTC+3 (TRT)

Örence is a village in the Bayburt District, Bayburt Province, Turkey. Its population is 587 (2021).
