= Yeniköy, Bayburt =

Yeniköy
- Village
- Location within Turkey
- Country: Turkey
- Province: Bayburt
- District: Bayburt
- Population (2021): 37
- Time zone: UTC+3 (TRT)

Yeniköy is a village in the Bayburt District, Bayburt Province, Turkey. Its population is 37 (2021).
