= Yaylalar, Bayburt =

Yaylalar
- Village
- Location within Turkey
- Coordinates: 40°3′35″N 40°13′34″E
- Country: Turkey
- Province: Bayburt
- District: Bayburt
- Population (2021): 66
- Time zone: UTC+3 (TRT)

Yaylalar is a village in the Bayburt District, Bayburt Province, Turkey. Its population is 66 (2021).
