= Salkımsu, Bayburt =

Salkımsu
- Village
- Location within Turkey
- Coordinates: 40°16′N 40°23′E
- Country: Turkey
- Province: Bayburt
- District: Bayburt
- Population (2021): 113
- Time zone: UTC+3 (TRT)

Salkımsu is a village in the Bayburt District, Bayburt Province, Turkey. Its population is 113 (2021).
