= Bayburt District =

District of Bayburt Province, Turkey

- District
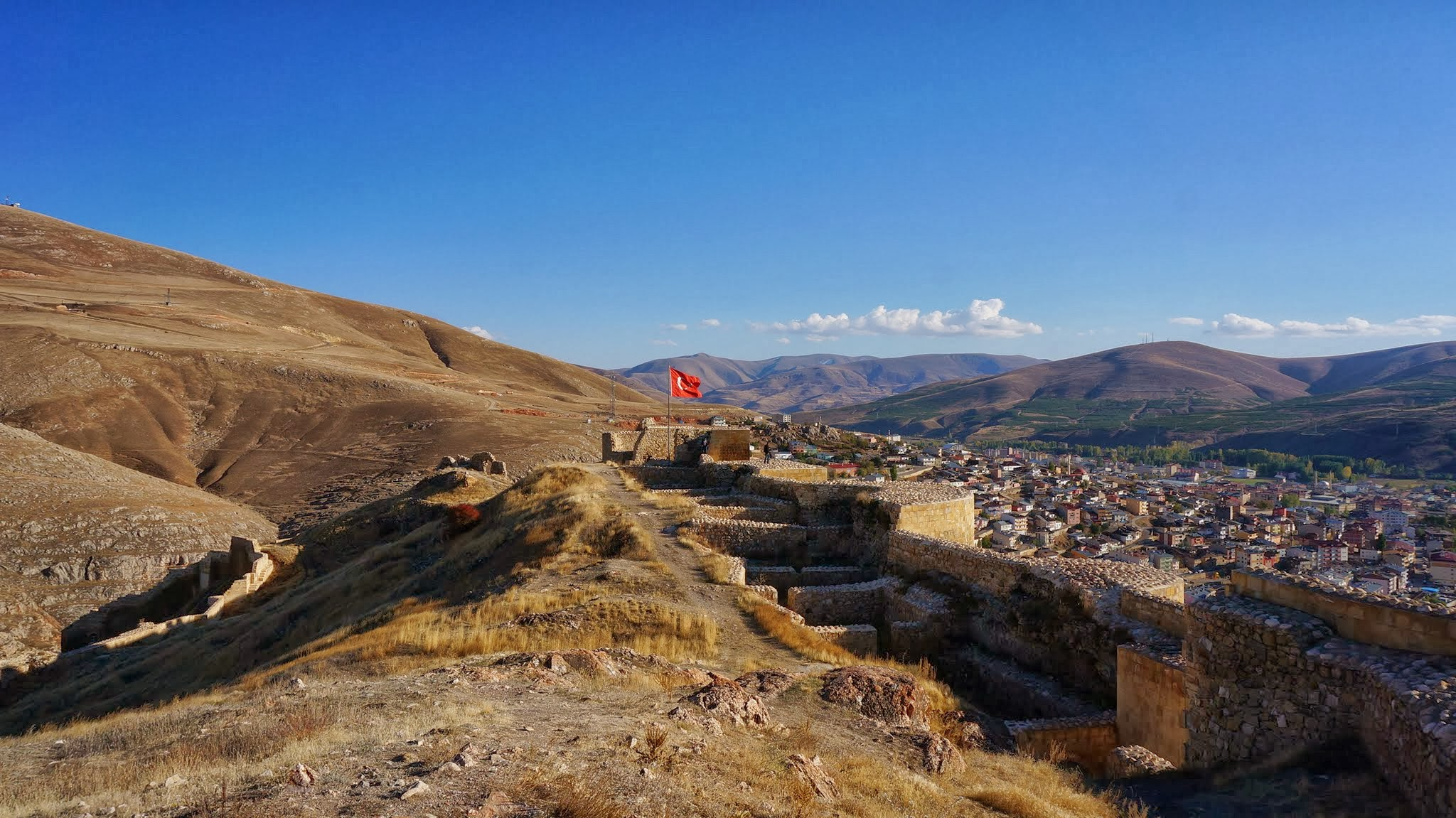
- Halfikale, Bayburt

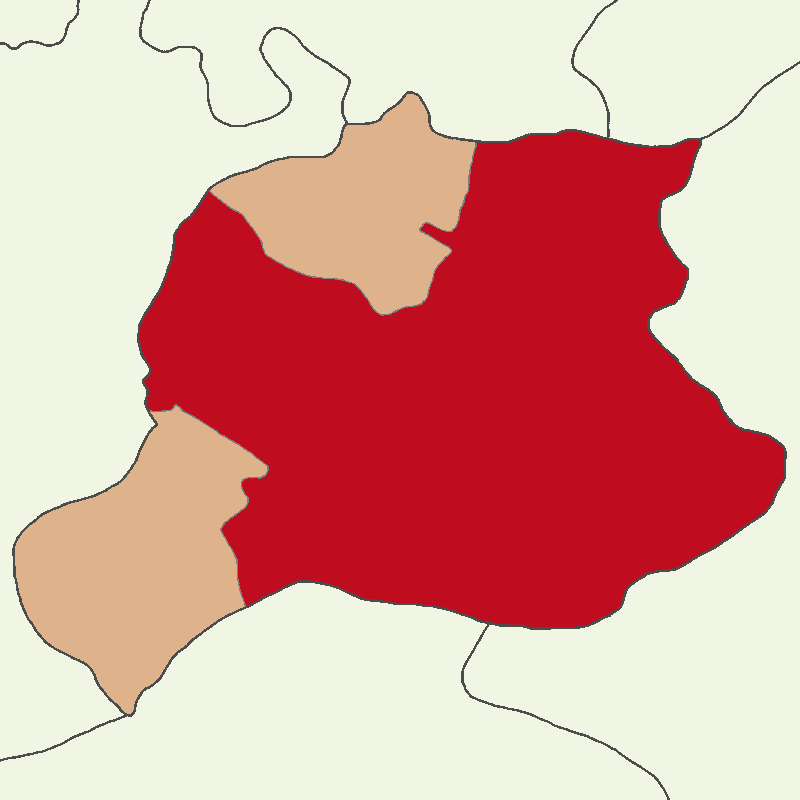
- Map showing Bayburt District in Bayburt Province

- Location within Turkey
- Coordinates: 40°16′N 40°14′E
- Country: Turkey
- Province: Bayburt
- Seat: Bayburt
- Area: 2,705 km^{2} (1,044 sq mi)
- Population (2021): 70,277
  - Density: 25.98/km^{2} (67.29/sq mi)
- Time zone: UTC+3 (TRT)

Bayburt District (also: Merkez, meaning "central") is a district of Bayburt Province of Turkey. Its seat is the city Bayburt. Its area is 2,705 km^{2}, and its population is 70,277 (2021).

== Composition ==
There is one municipality in Bayburt District:

- Arpalı
- Bayburt

There are 121 villages in Bayburt District:

- Adabaşı
- Ağören
- Akçakuzu
- Akduran
- Aksaçlı
- Akşar
- Alapelit
- Alıçlık
- Ardıçgöze
- Armutlu
- Arslandede
- Aşağıçimağıl
- Aşağıkışlak
- Aşağıpınarlı
- Aydıncık
- Balca
- Balkaynak
- Ballıkaya
- Başçımağıl
- Bayırtepe
- Bayraktar
- Buğdaylı
- Çakırbağ
- Çalıdere
- Çamdere
- Çamlıkoz
- Çayırözü
- Çayıryolu
- Çerçi
- Çiğdemtepe
- Çorak
- Dağçatı
- Dağtarla
- Danişment
- Darıca
- Değirmencik
- Demirışık
- Demirkaş
- Dikmetaş
- Dövmekaya
- Erenli
- Gençosman
- Gez
- Gökçeli
- Gökler
- Gökpınar
- Göldere
- Göloba
- Güder
- Güllüce
- Gümüşsu
- Güneydere
- Güzelce
- Hacıoğlu
- Harmanözü
- Helva
- Heybetepe
- Iğdır
- Kabaçayır
- Karlıca
- Karşıgeçit
- Kavacık
- Kavakyanı
- Kemertaş
- Kıratlı
- Kırkpınar
- Kitre
- Koçbayır
- Konursu
- Kop
- Kopuz
- Kozluk
- Kurbanpınar
- Kurugüney
- Maden
- Manas
- Masat
- Mutlu
- Nişantaşı
- Örence
- Ortaçımağıl
- Oruçbeyli
- Ozansu
- Pamuktaş
- Pelitli
- Petekkaya
- Polatlı
- Rüştü
- Sakızlı
- Salkımsu
- Sancaktepe
- Saraycık
- Sarıhan
- Sarımeşe
- Seydiyakup
- Sığırcı
- Sırakayalar
- Soğukgöze
- Söğütlü
- Taht
- Taşburun
- Taşçılar
- Taşkesen
- Taşocağı
- Tepetarla
- Tomlacık
- Uğrak
- Uğurgeldi
- Uluçayır
- Üzengili
- Yanıkçam
- Yaylalar
- Yaylapınar
- Yazyurdu
- Yedigöze
- Yeniköy
- Yerlice
- Yeşilyurt
- Yolaltı
- Yoncalı
- Yukarıkışlak
