= Çalıdere, Bayburt =

Çalıdere
- Village
- Location within Turkey
- Coordinates: 40.1011°N 40.4447°E
- Country: Turkey
- Province: Bayburt
- District: Bayburt
- Population (2021): 270
- Time zone: UTC+3 (TRT)

Çalıdere is a village in the Bayburt District, Bayburt Province, Turkey. Its population is 270 (2021).
