= Aşağıpınarlı, Bayburt =

Aşağıpınarlı
- Village
- Location within Turkey
- Coordinates: 40.1616°N 39.9744°E
- Country: Turkey
- Province: Bayburt
- District: Bayburt
- Population (2021): 38
- Time zone: UTC+3 (TRT)

Aşağıpınarlı is a village in the Bayburt District, Bayburt Province, Turkey. Its population is 38 (2021).
