= Kopuz, Bayburt =

Kopuz
- Village
- Location within Turkey
- Country: Turkey
- Province: Bayburt
- District: Bayburt
- Population (2021): 98
- Time zone: UTC+3 (TRT)

Kopuz is a village in the Bayburt District, Bayburt Province, Turkey. Its population is 98 (2021).
