= Akçakuzu, Bayburt =

Akçakuzu
- Village
- Location within Turkey
- Coordinates: 40°18′N 40°24′E
- Country: Turkey
- Province: Bayburt
- District: Bayburt
- Population (2021): 69
- Time zone: UTC+3 (TRT)

Akçakuzu is a village in the Bayburt District, Bayburt Province, Turkey. Its population is 69 (2021).

== History ==
The former name of the village was Kelenkes.
