= Rüştü, Bayburt =

Rüştü
- Village
- Location within Turkey
- Coordinates: 40°13′N 39°59′E
- Country: Turkey
- Province: Bayburt
- District: Bayburt
- Population (2021): 168
- Time zone: UTC+3 (TRT)

Rüştü (also: Rüştüköy) is a village in the Bayburt District, Bayburt Province, Turkey. Its population is 168 (2021).
