= Seydiyakup, Bayburt =

Seydiyakup
- Village
- Location within Turkey
- Coordinates: 40°25′N 40°16′E
- Country: Turkey
- Province: Bayburt
- District: Bayburt
- Population (2021): 89
- Time zone: UTC+3 (TRT)

Seydiyakup is a village in the Bayburt District, Bayburt Province, Turkey. Its population is 89 (2021).
