= Gökler, Bayburt =

Gökler
- Village
- Location within Turkey
- Coordinates: 40.4225°N 39.8908°E
- Country: Turkey
- Province: Bayburt
- District: Bayburt
- Population (2021): 70
- Time zone: UTC+3 (TRT)

Gökler is a village in the Bayburt District, Bayburt Province, Turkey. Its population is 70 (2021).
