= Başçımağıl, Bayburt =

Başçımağıl
- Village
- Location within Turkey
- Coordinates: 40°07′N 40°34′E
- Country: Turkey
- Province: Bayburt
- District: Bayburt
- Population (2021): 226
- Time zone: UTC+3 (TRT)

Başçımağıl is a village in the Bayburt District, Bayburt Province, Turkey. Its population is 226 (2021).
