= Dövmekaya, Bayburt =

Dövmekaya
- Village
- Location within Turkey
- Coordinates: 40°17′N 40°28′E
- Country: Turkey
- Province: Bayburt
- District: Bayburt
- Population (2021): 75
- Time zone: UTC+3 (TRT)

Dövmekaya is a village in the Bayburt District, Bayburt Province, Turkey. Its population is 75 (2021).
