= Güneydere, Bayburt =

Güneydere
- Village
- Interactive map of Güneydere
- Location within Turkey
- Coordinates: 40.3817°N 39.8989°E
- Country: Turkey
- Province: Bayburt
- District: Bayburt
- Population (2021): 139
- Time zone: UTC+3 (TRT)

Güneydere is a village in the Bayburt District, Bayburt Province, Turkey. Its population is 139 (2021).
