= Söğütlü, Bayburt =

Söğütlü
- Village
- Location within Turkey
- Country: Turkey
- Province: Bayburt
- District: Bayburt
- Population (2021): 221
- Time zone: UTC+3 (TRT)

Söğütlü is a village in the Bayburt District, Bayburt Province, Turkey. Its population is 221 (2021). The old name of Söğütlü is Hindi. In Hindi is not just a mosque, there is also a 600 years old church. The church is very big. According to legends there is a treasure from the Armenians.
