= Aşağıçimağıl, Bayburt =

Aşağıçımağıl
- Village
- Location within Turkey
- Coordinates: 40°08′N 40°38′E
- Country: Turkey
- Province: Bayburt
- District: Bayburt
- Population (2021): 82
- Time zone: UTC+3 (TRT)

Aşağıçımağıl is a village in the Bayburt District, Bayburt Province, Turkey. Its population is 82 (2021).
