= Yerlice, Bayburt =

Yerlice
- Village
- Location within Turkey
- Coordinates: 40°18′N 40°20′E
- Country: Turkey
- Province: Bayburt
- District: Bayburt
- Population (2021): 95
- Time zone: UTC+3 (TRT)

Yerlice is a village in the Bayburt District, Bayburt Province, Turkey. Its population is 95 (2021).
