= Heybetepe, Bayburt =

Heybetepe
- Village
- Location within Turkey
- Coordinates: 40°13′N 40°22′E
- Country: Turkey
- Province: Bayburt
- District: Bayburt
- Population (2021): 80
- Time zone: UTC+3 (TRT)

Heybetepe is a village in the Bayburt District, Bayburt Province, Turkey. Its population is 80 (2021).
