= Ortaçımağıl, Bayburt =

Ortaçımağıl
- Village
- Location within Turkey
- Coordinates: 40°06′N 40°36′E
- Country: Turkey
- Province: Bayburt
- District: Bayburt
- Population (2021): 150
- Time zone: UTC+3 (TRT)

Ortaçımağıl is a village in the Bayburt District, Bayburt Province, Turkey. Its population is 150 (2021).
