= Saraycık, Bayburt =

Saraycık
- Village
- Location within Turkey
- Country: Turkey
- Province: Bayburt
- District: Bayburt
- Population (2021): 165
- Time zone: UTC+3 (TRT)

Saraycık is a village in the Bayburt District, Bayburt Province, Turkey. Its population is 165 as of the 2021 census.
