= Nişantaşı, Bayburt =

Nişantaşı
- Village
- Location within Turkey
- Coordinates: 40.3572°N 40.0458°E
- Country: Turkey
- Province: Bayburt
- District: Bayburt
- Population (2021): 198
- Time zone: UTC+3 (TRT)

Nişantaşı is a village in the Bayburt District, Bayburt Province, Turkey. Its population is 198 (2021).
