= Taşkesen, Bayburt =

Taşkesen
- Village
- Location within Turkey
- Coordinates: 40.3272°N 40.1808°E
- Country: Turkey
- Province: Bayburt
- District: Bayburt
- Population (2021): 106
- Time zone: UTC+3 (TRT)

Taşkesen is a village in the Bayburt District, Bayburt Province, Turkey. Its population is 106 (2021).
