= Yanıkçam, Bayburt =

Yanıkçam
- Village
- Location within Turkey
- Coordinates: 40°21′N 40°29′E
- Country: Turkey
- Province: Bayburt
- District: Bayburt
- Population (2021): 64
- Time zone: UTC+3 (TRT)

Yanıkçam is a village in the Bayburt District, Bayburt Province, Turkey. Its population is 64 (2021).
