= Yaylapınar, Bayburt =

Yaylapınar
- Village
- Location within Turkey
- Country: Turkey
- Province: Bayburt
- District: Bayburt
- Population (2021): 334
- Time zone: UTC+3 (TRT)

Yaylapınar is a village in the Bayburt District, Bayburt Province, Turkey. Its population is 334 (2021).

== Geography ==
It is 31 km from the center of Bayburt.

== Climate ==
The climate of the village is in the area of influence of the Black Sea climate.

== Population ==
Historical population
Year	Pop.	±% p.a.
1997	399	—
2000	429	+2.45%
2010	367	−1.55%
2021	334	−0.85%

== Economy ==
The economy of a village depends on agriculture and husbandry.

== Infrastructure information ==
In the village, there is no primary school but transporting education is benefited. The village has drinking water network, but there is no sewerage system. There is no PTT branch and PTT agency. There is no health centers and health posts. There is electricity and fixed telephone in the village.
