= Aşağıkışlak, Bayburt =

Aşağıkışlak
- Village
- Location within Turkey
- Coordinates: 40.1472°N 40.1270°E
- Country: Turkey
- Province: Bayburt
- District: Bayburt
- Population (2021): 83
- Time zone: UTC+3 (TRT)

Aşağıkışlak is a village in the Bayburt District, Bayburt Province, Turkey. Its population is 83 (2021).
