= Dağtarla, Bayburt =

Dağtarla
- Village
- Location within Turkey
- Coordinates: 40°20′30″N 40°25′20″E
- Country: Turkey
- Province: Bayburt
- District: Bayburt
- Population (2021): 178
- Time zone: UTC+3 (TRT)

Dağtarla is a village in the Bayburt District, Bayburt Province, Turkey. Its population is 178 (2021).
