= Sakızlı, Bayburt =

Sakızlı
- Village
- Location within Turkey
- Country: Turkey
- Province: Bayburt
- District: Bayburt
- Population (2021): 132
- Time zone: UTC+3 (TRT)

Sakızlı is a village in the Bayburt District, Bayburt Province, Turkey. Its population is 132 (2021).
