= Güzelce, Bayburt =

Güzelce
- Village
- Location within Turkey
- Coordinates: 40°6′33″N 39°59′14″E
- Country: Turkey
- Province: Bayburt
- District: Bayburt
- Population (2021): 53
- Time zone: UTC+3 (TRT)

Güzelce is a village in the Bayburt District, Bayburt Province, Turkey. Its population is 53 (2021).
