= Tomlacık, Bayburt =

Tomlacık
- Village
- Location within Turkey
- Coordinates: 40°14′N 39°57′E
- Country: Turkey
- Province: Bayburt
- District: Bayburt
- Population (2021): 152
- Time zone: UTC+3 (TRT)

Tomlacık is a village in the Bayburt District, Bayburt Province, Turkey. Its population is 152 (2021).
