= Çamdere, Bayburt =

Çamdere
- Village
- Location within Turkey
- Coordinates: 40.1630°N 40.0066°E
- Country: Turkey
- Province: Bayburt
- District: Bayburt
- Population (2021): 66
- Time zone: UTC+3 (TRT)

Çamdere is a village in the Bayburt District, Bayburt Province, Turkey. Its population is 66 (2021).
