= Kitre, Bayburt =

Kitre
- Village
- Location within Turkey
- Coordinates: 40°19′N 39°52′E
- Country: Turkey
- Province: Bayburt
- District: Bayburt
- Population (2021): 187
- Time zone: UTC+3 (TRT)

Kitre is a village in the Bayburt District, Bayburt Province, Turkey. Its population is 187 (2021).
