= Demirışık, Bayburt =

Demirışık
- Village
- Country: Turkey
- Province: Bayburt
- District: Bayburt
- Population (2021): 32
- Time zone: UTC+3 (TRT)

Demirışık is a village in the Bayburt District, Bayburt Province, Turkey. Its population is 32 (2021).
