= Tepetarla, Bayburt =

Tepetarla
- Village
- Location within Turkey
- Country: Turkey
- Province: Bayburt
- District: Bayburt
- Population (2021): 46
- Time zone: UTC+3 (TRT)

Tepetarla is a village in the Bayburt District, Bayburt Province, Turkey. Its population is 46 (2021).
