= Dikmetaş, Demirözü =

Dikmetaş
- Village
- Location within Turkey
- Coordinates: 40.0411°N 39.7847°E
- Country: Turkey
- Province: Bayburt
- District: Demirözü
- Population (2021): 97
- Time zone: UTC+3 (TRT)

Dikmetaş is a village in the Demirözü District, Bayburt Province, Turkey. Its population is 97 (2021).

== History ==
The former name of the village was Ağgi.
