= Helva, Bayburt =

Helva
- Village
- Location within Turkey
- Coordinates: 40°09′N 40°29′E
- Country: Turkey
- Province: Bayburt
- District: Bayburt
- Population (2021): 236
- Time zone: UTC+3 (TRT)

Helva (also: Helvaköy) is a village in the Bayburt District, Bayburt Province, Turkey. Its population is 236 (2021).
