= Göldere, Bayburt =

Göldere
- Village
- Location within Turkey
- Coordinates: 40.1292°N 40.1083°E
- Country: Turkey
- Province: Bayburt
- District: Bayburt
- Population (2021): 46
- Time zone: UTC+3 (TRT)

Göldere is a village in the Bayburt District, Bayburt Province, Turkey. Its population is 46 (2021).
