= Soğukgöze, Bayburt =

Soğukgöze
- Village
- Location within Turkey
- Coordinates: 40.111°N 39.965°E
- Country: Turkey
- Province: Bayburt
- District: Bayburt
- Population (2021): 99
- Time zone: UTC+3 (TRT)

Soğukgöze is a village in the Bayburt District, Bayburt Province, Turkey. Its population is 99 (2021).
