= Ballıkaya, Bayburt =

Ballıkaya
- Village
- Location within Turkey
- Coordinates: 40.3730°N 40.3873°E
- Country: Turkey
- Province: Bayburt
- District: Bayburt
- Population (2021): 117
- Time zone: UTC+3 (TRT)

Ballıkaya (formerly: Pigeyi, Puki) is a village in the Bayburt District, Bayburt Province, Turkey. Its population is 117 (2021).
