= Uluçayır, Bayburt =

Uluçayır
- Village
- Country: Turkey
- Province: Bayburt
- District: Bayburt
- Population (2021): 123
- Time zone: UTC+3 (TRT)

Uluçayır is a village in the Bayburt District, Bayburt Province, Turkey. Its population is 123 (2021).
