= Danişment, Bayburt =

Danişment
- Village
- Location within Turkey
- Coordinates: 40.255°N 40.1533°E
- Country: Turkey
- Province: Bayburt
- District: Bayburt
- Population (2021): 493
- Time zone: UTC+3 (TRT)

Danişment (formerly: Danişmend) is a village in the Bayburt District, Bayburt Province, Turkey. Its population is 493 (2021).
