= Masat, Bayburt =

Masat
- Village
- Location within Turkey
- Country: Turkey
- Province: Bayburt
- District: Bayburt
- Elevation: 1,788 m (5,866 ft)
- Population (2021): 550
- Time zone: UTC+3 (TRT)
- Postal code: 69002
- Area code: 0458

Masat (“مصاد” (Maṣād), Masad: 1928; Masat, 1933; Yıldırım, 1968; Masat, 1990s) is a village in the Bayburt District of the Bayburt Province in Turkey. As of 2021, its population was recorded as 550.

== Name ==
The name of the village during the Ottoman Era was generally known as Masad, although it had varied spellings, such as “مصاد” (Maṣād), “ماساد” (Māsād), “مساد” (Masād), “مصعاد” (Maṣˁād) and “ماساط” (Māsāṭ). After 1959, the name of the village became Yıldırım, but the name did not last long and was not frequently used. The former name, Masat, has since replaced Yıldırım in 1990s.

== Geography ==
The village is 32 kilometers from the province center. The village of Masat is generally considered to have two major settlements, those being Upper Masat and Lower Masat. However, they do not have official recognition as being separate. The village center is based in Lower Masat. Notable buildings in Lower Masat include 18 Numbered Family Health Center, the Dede Korkut Primary School, the Dede Korkut Imam Hatip Middle School, and the Masat Village Mosque. The other mosque of the village is based in Upper Masat in addition to being 4 kilometers away from Lower Masat. The Masat Stream and the Çoruh River also flow through this village.

== Tourism ==
The Dome of Dede Korkut is two kilometers away from the village center. The dome was renovated in 1994.
