= Konursu, Bayburt =

Konursu
- Village
- Location within Turkey
- Coordinates: 40°24′N 40°16′E
- Country: Turkey
- Province: Bayburt
- District: Bayburt
- Population (2021): 1,093
- Time zone: UTC+3 (TRT)

Konursu is a village in the Bayburt District, Bayburt Province, Turkey. Its population is 1,093 (2021). Before the 2013 reorganisation, it was a town (belde).
