= Manas, Bayburt =

Manas
- Village
- Location within Turkey
- Coordinates: 40°17′N 39°56′E
- Country: Turkey
- Province: Bayburt
- District: Bayburt
- Population (2021): 64
- Time zone: UTC+3 (TRT)

Manas is a village in the Bayburt District, Bayburt Province, Turkey. Its population is 64 (2021).
