= Buğdaylı, Bayburt =

Buğdaylı
- Village
- Location within Turkey
- Coordinates: 40.3211°N 40.2727°E
- Country: Turkey
- Province: Bayburt
- District: Bayburt
- Population (2021): 115
- Time zone: UTC+3 (TRT)

Buğdaylı is a village in the Bayburt District, Bayburt Province, Turkey. Its population is 115 (2021).
