= Ağören, Bayburt =

Ağören
- Village
- Location within Turkey
- Coordinates: 40.1564°N 40.6813°E
- Country: Turkey
- Province: Bayburt
- District: Bayburt
- Population (2021): 147
- Time zone: UTC+3 (TRT)

Ağören is a village in the Bayburt District, Bayburt Province, Turkey, and as at 2021, its population was 147.
