= Dikmetaş, Bayburt =

Dikmetaş
- Village

- Location within Turkey
- Coordinates: 40°21′41″N 40°15′42″E
- Country: Turkey
- Province: Bayburt
- District: Bayburt
- Population (2021): 98
- Time zone: UTC+3 (TRT)

Dikmetaş is a village in the Bayburt District, Bayburt Province, Turkey. Its population is 98 (2021).
