= Çayıryolu, Bayburt =

Çayıryolu Sünür
- Village
- Location within Turkey
- Coordinates: 40°15′17″N 39°54′44″E
- Country: Turkey
- Province: Bayburt
- District: Bayburt
- Population (2021): 231
- Time zone: UTC+3 (TRT)

Çayıryolu, formerly Sünür, is a village in the Bayburt District, Bayburt Province, Turkey. Its population is 231 (2021). Before the 2013 reorganisation, it was a town (belde). The village has a historic mosque and mausoleum.

The present mosque is largely rebuilt in concrete sometimes after 1967. The minaret of the mosque dates to 1676/77 but its base could be an earlier construction. The mosque was repaired by the Ottomans after the village was burned by the Safavid Tahmasp I in 1548/49. The repairs are commemorated by an Ottoman inscription in the mosque written in Persian with the date of 1550. Located in the mosque's graveyard is a ruined tomb believed to be of the Akkoyunlu ruler Kutlu Bey (d. 1389). Kutlu Bey was the father of Kara Yülük Osman Bey who founded the Akkoyunlu State.

Sünür (derived from the Greek "Sinora", border) has the remains of the ruins of the tower where Mithridates halted on his retreat from Armenia.
