= Arpalı =

- Municipality
- Location in Turkey
- Coordinates: 40°22′N 40°10′E
- Country: Turkey
- Province: Bayburt
- District: Bayburt

Government
  - Mayor: Abdurrahman Polattimur (AKP)
- Area: 25 km^{2} (10 sq mi)
- Elevation: 1,538 m (5,046 ft)
- Population (2021): 2,608
  - Density: 100/km^{2} (270/sq mi)
- Time zone: UTC+3 (TRT)
- Postal code: 69550
- Area code: 0458

Arpalı is a town (belde) and municipality in the Bayburt District, Bayburt Province, northeastern Turkey. Its population is 2,608 (2021). Arpali consists of three quarters: Cumhuriyet, Hūrriyet and Çiçekli.

== History ==
The oldest written source about Arpalı is dated at 1516 with the name Niv. In the book Bayburt Province, Prof. Dr. İsmet Miroğlu states that only eight Muslim and 41 Christian soldiers were living at Arpalı in 1516.

== Parks and shops ==
There are a couple of parks in Arpalı, including scenic parks located around the Çoruh River region. There are several shops and one mall in Arpalı, and due to transportation availability from Bayburt it is possible to find most basic necessities.

== Education ==
There are no colleges or universities in Arpalı, but there are primary, secondary and high schools.

== Transportation ==
Public transport services exists from Bayburt to Arpalı, it is possible to find a bus every 15 minutes from 8:00 am to 18:00 pm. After 18:00, intercity buses which are going north to Trabzon or Gümüşhane also pass through Arpalı municipality.

== Sports ==
Arpalıspor is one of the best teams in Bayburt province. It consists of mostly local players. Lokman Ergul was the director for a couple of years and during this time the team improved its quality and got successful results at Bayburt league.
