= Gökçedere, Demirözü =

Gökçedere Pulur
- Municipality
- Location in Turkey
- Coordinates: 40°8′1″N 39°44′51″E
- Country: Turkey
- Province: Bayburt
- District: Demirözü
- Population (2021): 2,396
- Time zone: UTC+3 (TRT)

Gökçedere is a town (belde) and municipality in the Demirözü District, Bayburt Province, Turkey. Its population is 2,396 (2021).

== History ==
Gökçedere has its roots in the history. It has been a Turkish town, where Chepni Turks have been living for more than six centuries. Gökçedere was one of the cross points of the ancient silk road. To support merchants on the town, Aq Qoyunlu built inns, hamams, madrasah and mosque. Ulu Mosque and its madrasah, which were built in 1517 are the only things remaining from those times. When Selim I conquered Bayburt in 1514 and Gökçedere became Ottoman Empire town. Gökçedere's original name was Pulur which was used in the past.

== Geography ==
Gökçedere is surrounded by small villages, i.e. Eymür, Bayrampaşa (Hığni) in the east, Çimentepe (Kütüdü), Kavaklı (Poyuk) in the west, Petekli (Çorozma), Yakupabdal in the south and Köse which is a town in Gümüşhane in the north. It has average altitude of 1700m. Gökçedere is cold and snowy in the winder and warm in the summer. People do animal husbandry and farming to support their lives.

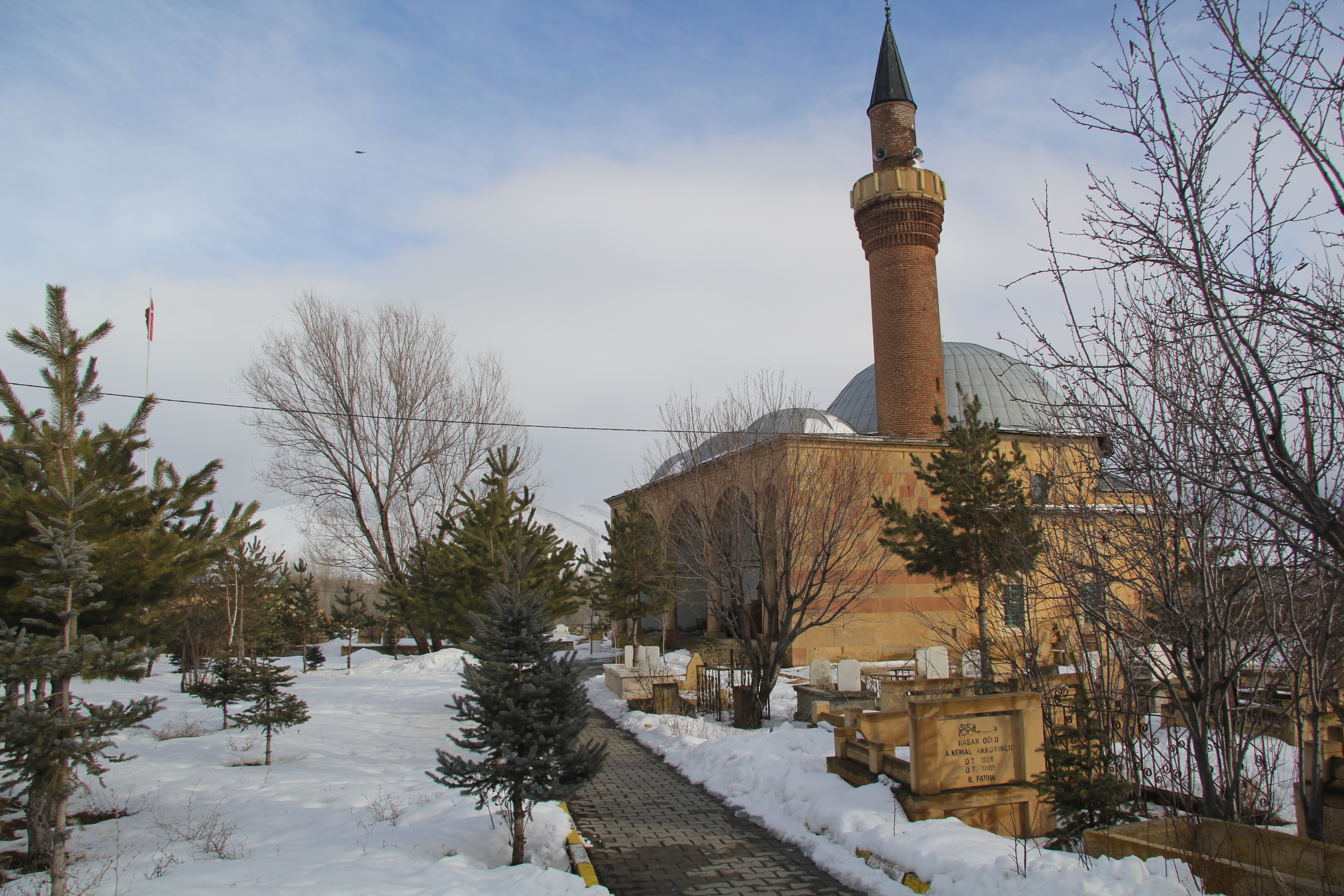
Ferahşad Bey Mosque, Gökçedere
