= Akşar, Bayburt =

Akşar
- Village
- Location within Turkey
- Coordinates: 40.3507°N 39.9740°E
- Country: Turkey
- Province: Bayburt
- District: Bayburt
- Population (2021): 512
- Time zone: UTC+3 (TRT)

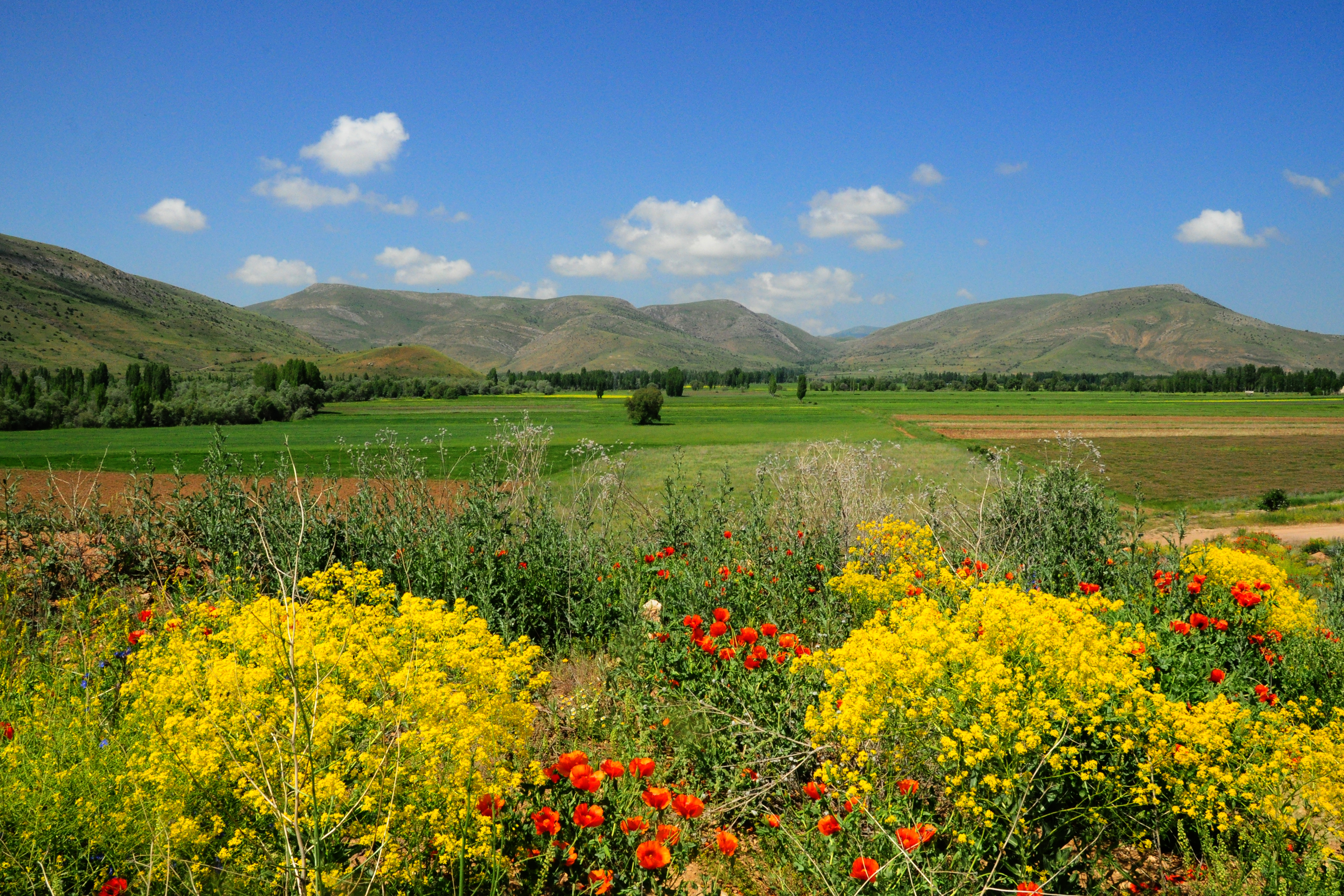
A view of the area around the town.

Akşar is a village in the Bayburt District, Bayburt Province, Turkey. Its population is 512 (2021). Before the 2013 reorganisation, it was a town (belde).

== History ==
The former name of the village was Balahor.
