= Bayburt =

- Municipality
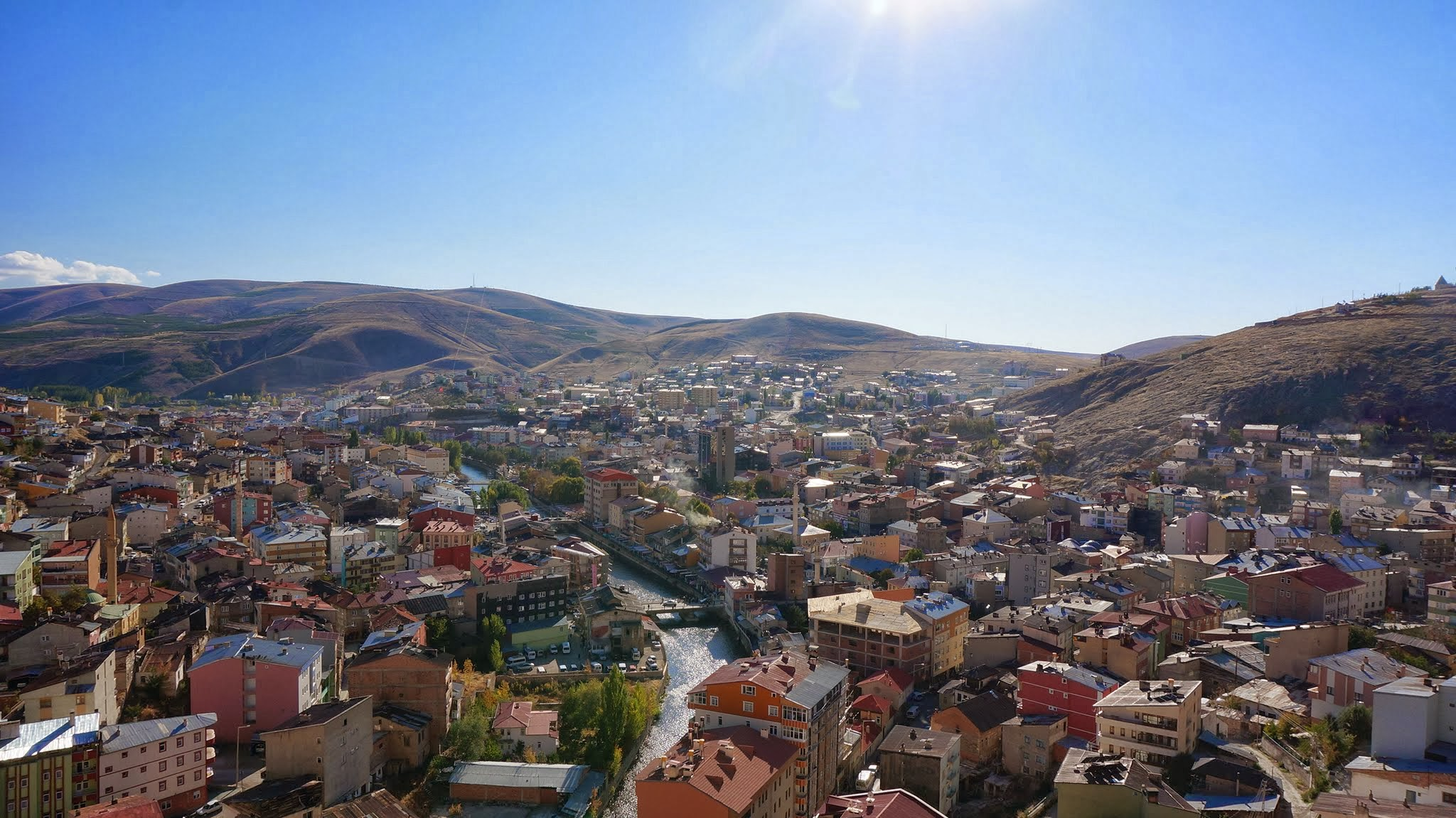
- Bayburt City

- Coat of arms

- Location within Turkey
- Coordinates: 40°15′35″N 40°13′40″E
- Country: Turkey
- Province: Bayburt
- District: Bayburt

Government
  - Mayor: Mete Memiş (AKP)
- Elevation: 1,550 m (5,090 ft)
- Population (2021): 48,036
- Time zone: UTC+3 (TRT)
- Postal code: 69000
- Area code: 0458
- Website: www.bayburt.bel.tr

Bayburt is a city in northeast Turkey lying on the Çoruh River. It is the seat of Bayburt Province and Bayburt District. Its population is 48,036 (2021).

Bayburt was once an important center on the ancient Silk Road. It was visited by Marco Polo in the 13th century, and also by Evliya Çelebi in the 16th century. Remains of its medieval castle still exist. There are several historical mosques, hammams, and tombs in the city. There are also ancient historical sites such as the Çatalçeşme Underground Complex and natural wonders like the Sirakayalar Waterfall in the other parts of the province.

== Name and etymology ==
The name of the town was formerly written in Ottoman Turkish as بايبورد (Bayburd) and in English as Baiburt. It was known under a variety of names during the Byzantine period; Procopius naming the city Baiberdon, meanwhile Kedrenos calling it Paiperte. The name derives from the medieval Armenian Baydbert (Բայտբերդ). In Movses of Khoren's History of Armenia the town is being named as Բայբերդ (Paypert). Movses asserts that the city's ancient name was Smpadapert, in reference to the Smbat I, founder of the Bagratuni dynasty. Dede Korkut mentions the city in his book a couple of times as بايبورد (Bayburd). It is thought that Baydbert consists of two words namely Bayd and Bert. The first one has been discussed so much but true etymon is not clear yet. However, the second one is most probably an Armenian loanword bert (բերդ) "fortress".

== History ==
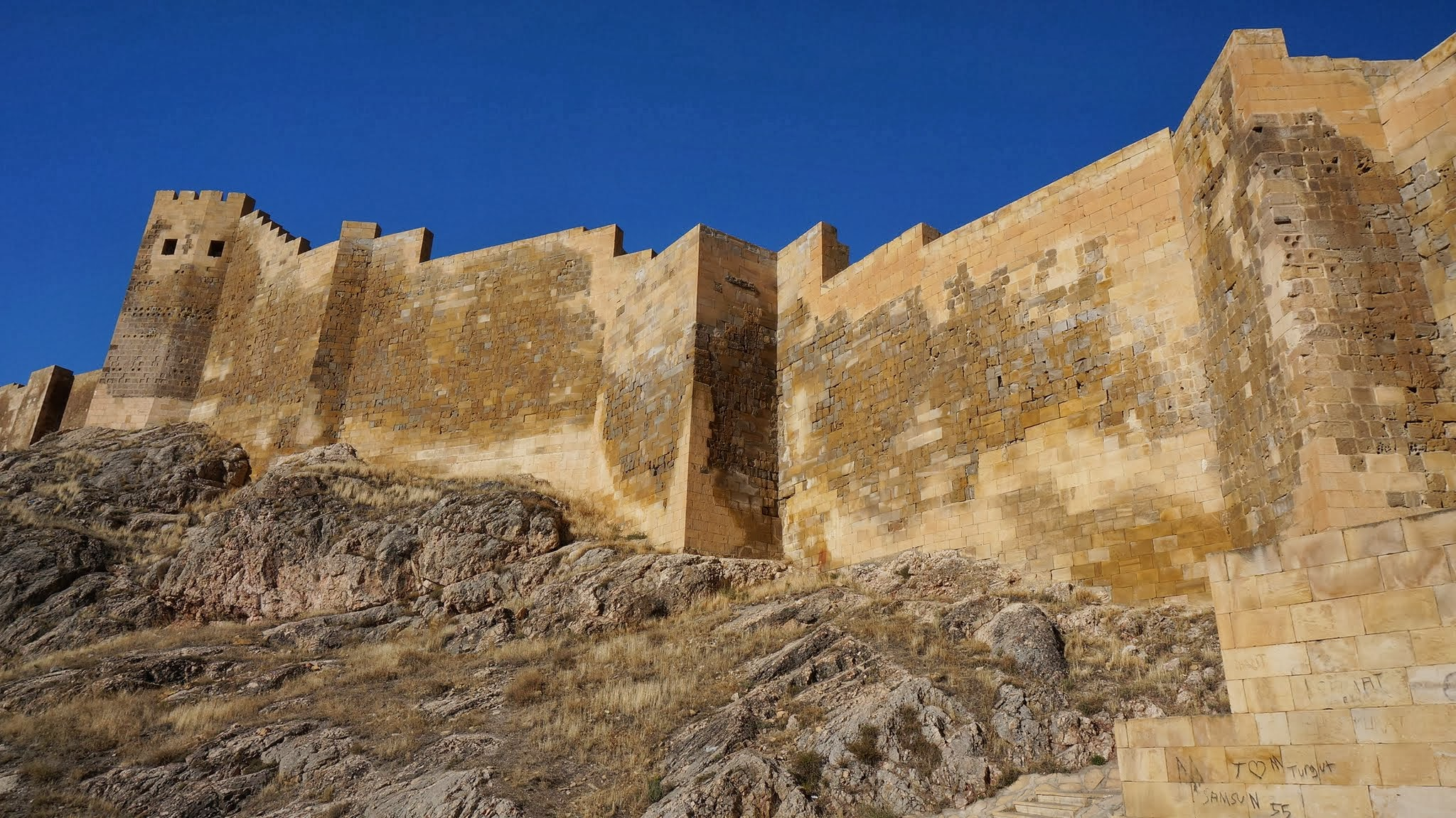
Bayburt Castle

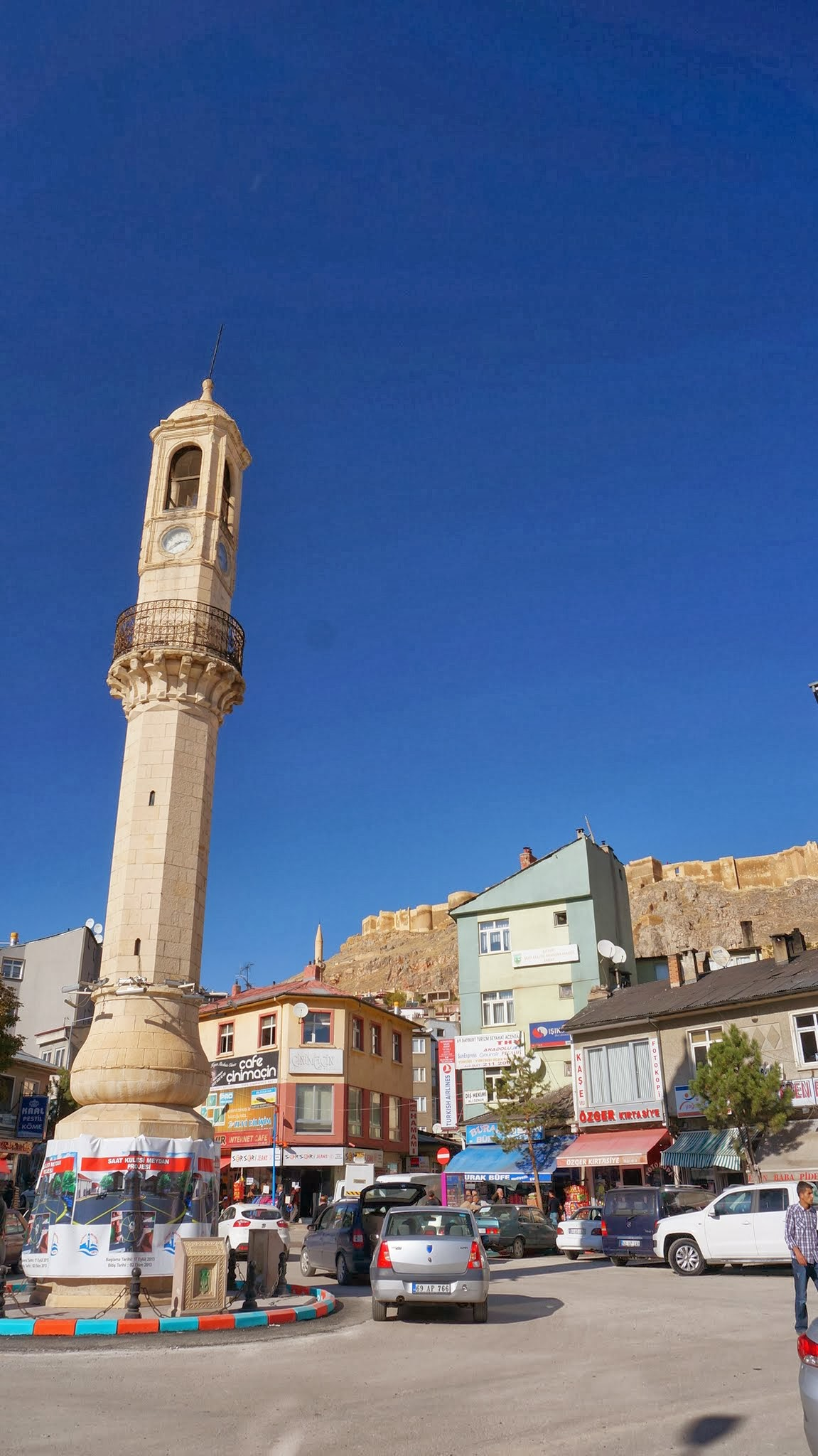
City Center

Bayburt was a part of Hayasa-Azzi, then was subsequently settled or conquered by the Cimmerians in the 8th century BC, the Medes in the 7th century BC, then the Persian Empire, Lesser Armenia, Pontus, Greater Armenia, Rome, the Byzantines, the Bagratid Armenian Kingdom, the Seljuk Turks, the Aq Qoyunlu, Safavid Persia, and then the Ottoman Turks.

The town was the site of an Armenian fortress in the 1st century and may have been the Baiberdon fortified by the emperor Justinian. It was raided by the Seljuks in 1054, recaptured by Theodore Gabras, and conquered by the Danishmendids before the Crusade of 1101. It was a stronghold of the Genovese in the late Middle Ages and prospered in the late 13th and early 14th century because of the commerce between Trebizond and Persia. It contained a mint under the Seljuks and Ilkhanids. From c. 1243 to 1266, Bayburt was under brief control of the Georgian princes of Samtskhe. A Christian church within the Bayburt Castle was built in the 13th century under the Trapezuntine or Georgian influence.

Bayburt and the surrounding areas are considered to be one of the earliest Turkish settlements in Anatolia. Under Ottoman rule, the town was the center of the Bayburt Sanjak in Erzurum Eyalet. When Erzurum was devastated in the early 16th century, Bayburt served for a time as the de facto capital of the province. The area was raided by the Safavids in 1553. Bayburt was captured by a Russian army under General Paskevich and its fortifications thoroughly demolished in 1829. It was the furthest westward reach of the Russians during that campaign. The British traveller and geologist William Hamilton commented on the ruins in the 1840s, though the population grew to 6,000 by the 1870s. The bazaar, however, remained poor and the town long lacked industry. On the eve of the First World War, the population of 10,000 was mostly Turkish with some Armenians.

According to the Qamus al-A'lam (Qāmūsu'l-aˁlām/قاموس الأعلام, “Dictionary of the World”) of Shemseddin Sami, Sanjak of Bayburt, comprising four kazas called Ispir, Şiran, Kelkit and Bayburt itself, had 505 villages and 40 nahiyes. The sanjak had a population of 124,019 people, of whom 108,373 were Turkish and Muslim, with the rest of the population being Christian, predominantly Armenian.

Inside the Sanjak of Bayburt there were said to be 292 mosque and masjids, 176 madrasash, 87 church and monastery, 2 middle school (rushdiye), 108 primary school (sıbyan mektebi).

== Geography ==
Bayburt straddles the Çoruh amid an open and fertile plateau on the route between Trabzon and Erzurum.

=== Climate ===
Bayburt has a continental climate with warm summers and cold winters. Precipitation is fairly frequent most of the year, with a peak in spring. The city gets frequent, but not necessarily heavy snow, the highest snow depth recorded was 110 cm (43.3 inches) in March 1976.

Highest recorded temperature:38.4 °C (101.1 °F) on 15 August 2019
Lowest recorded temperature:−31.3 °C (−24.3 °F) on 20 January 1972

Climate data for Bayburt (1991–2020, extremes 1959–2023)
Month	Jan	Feb	Mar	Apr	May	Jun	Jul	Aug	Sep	Oct	Nov	Dec	Year
Record high °C (°F)	11.0 (51.8)	13.9 (57.0)	21.2 (70.2)	25.3 (77.5)	31.3 (88.3)	34.7 (94.5)	37.0 (98.6)	38.4 (101.1)	34.4 (93.9)	28.8 (83.8)	20.7 (69.3)	18.2 (64.8)	38.4 (101.1)
Mean daily maximum °C (°F)	−0.2 (31.6)	1.3 (34.3)	6.9 (44.4)	13.5 (56.3)	18.8 (65.8)	23.7 (74.7)	27.8 (82.0)	28.6 (83.5)	24.2 (75.6)	17.6 (63.7)	9.0 (48.2)	2.1 (35.8)	14.4 (57.9)
Daily mean °C (°F)	−5.4 (22.3)	−4.2 (24.4)	1.3 (34.3)	7.2 (45.0)	11.9 (53.4)	15.9 (60.6)	19.3 (66.7)	19.5 (67.1)	15.2 (59.4)	9.9 (49.8)	2.7 (36.9)	−3.0 (26.6)	7.5 (45.5)
Mean daily minimum °C (°F)	−9.7 (14.5)	−8.8 (16.2)	−3.5 (25.7)	1.7 (35.1)	5.8 (42.4)	8.6 (47.5)	11.4 (52.5)	11.6 (52.9)	7.7 (45.9)	4.0 (39.2)	−2.0 (28.4)	−6.9 (19.6)	1.7 (35.1)
Record low °C (°F)	−31.3 (−24.3)	−27.6 (−17.7)	−28.3 (−18.9)	−12.7 (9.1)	−4.4 (24.1)	−1.6 (29.1)	0.2 (32.4)	2.4 (36.3)	−2.1 (28.2)	−10.6 (12.9)	−23.6 (−10.5)	−29.0 (−20.2)	−31.3 (−24.3)
Average precipitation mm (inches)	29.3 (1.15)	32.1 (1.26)	47.3 (1.86)	67.5 (2.66)	78.5 (3.09)	47.0 (1.85)	25.9 (1.02)	16.8 (0.66)	23.0 (0.91)	47.1 (1.85)	31.0 (1.22)	30.1 (1.19)	475.6 (18.72)
Average precipitation days	10.7	11.77	13.6	14.77	16.37	10.57	5.7	4.6	5.57	9.33	8.53	11.27	122.8
Average relative humidity (%)	69.4	67.3	60.9	56.5	56	53.3	49.2	48.6	49.7	57.3	63.6	70.1	58.5
Source 1: Turkish State Meteorological Service
Source 2: NOAA(humidity)

== Sights ==
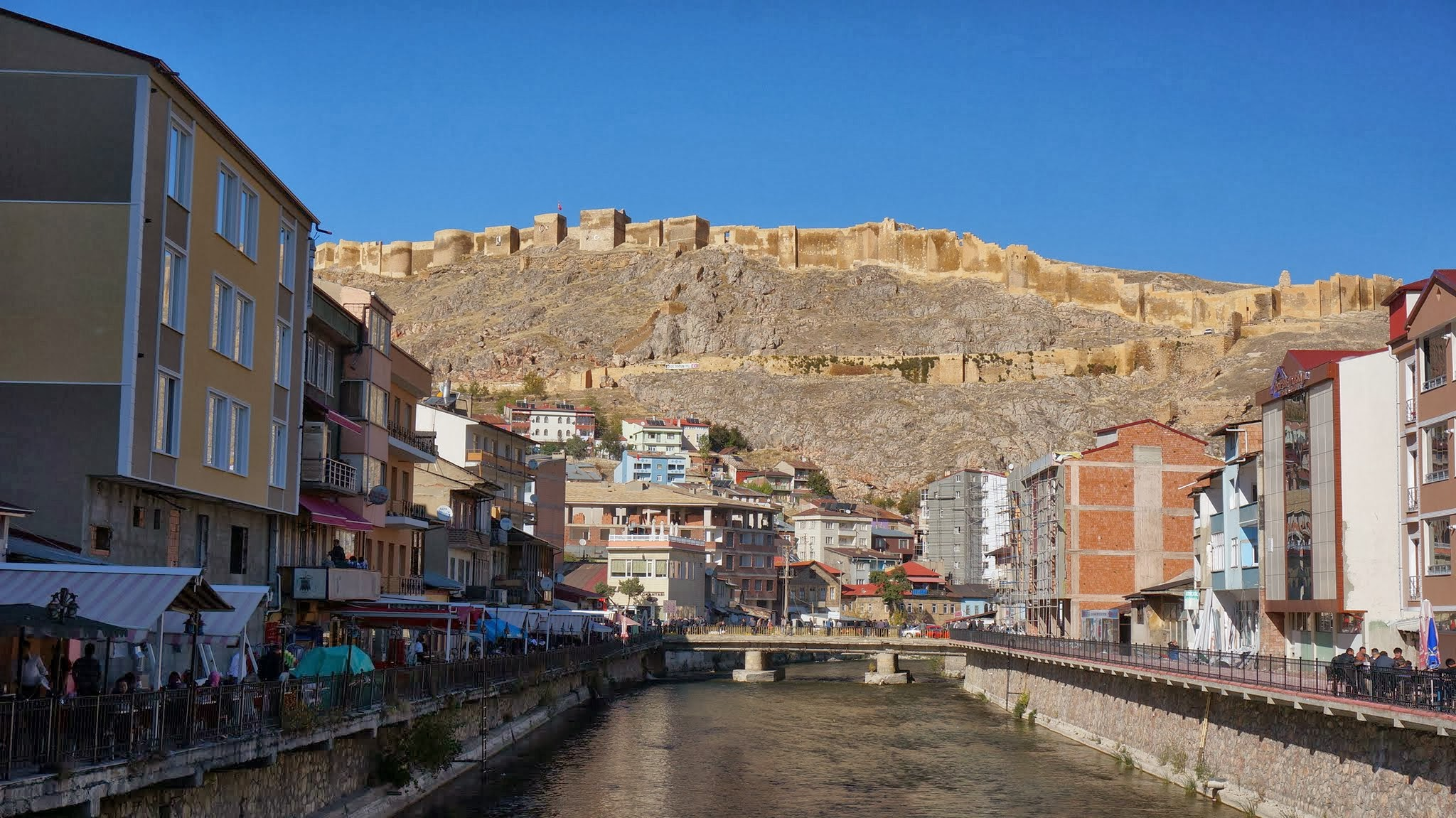
City view near the river.

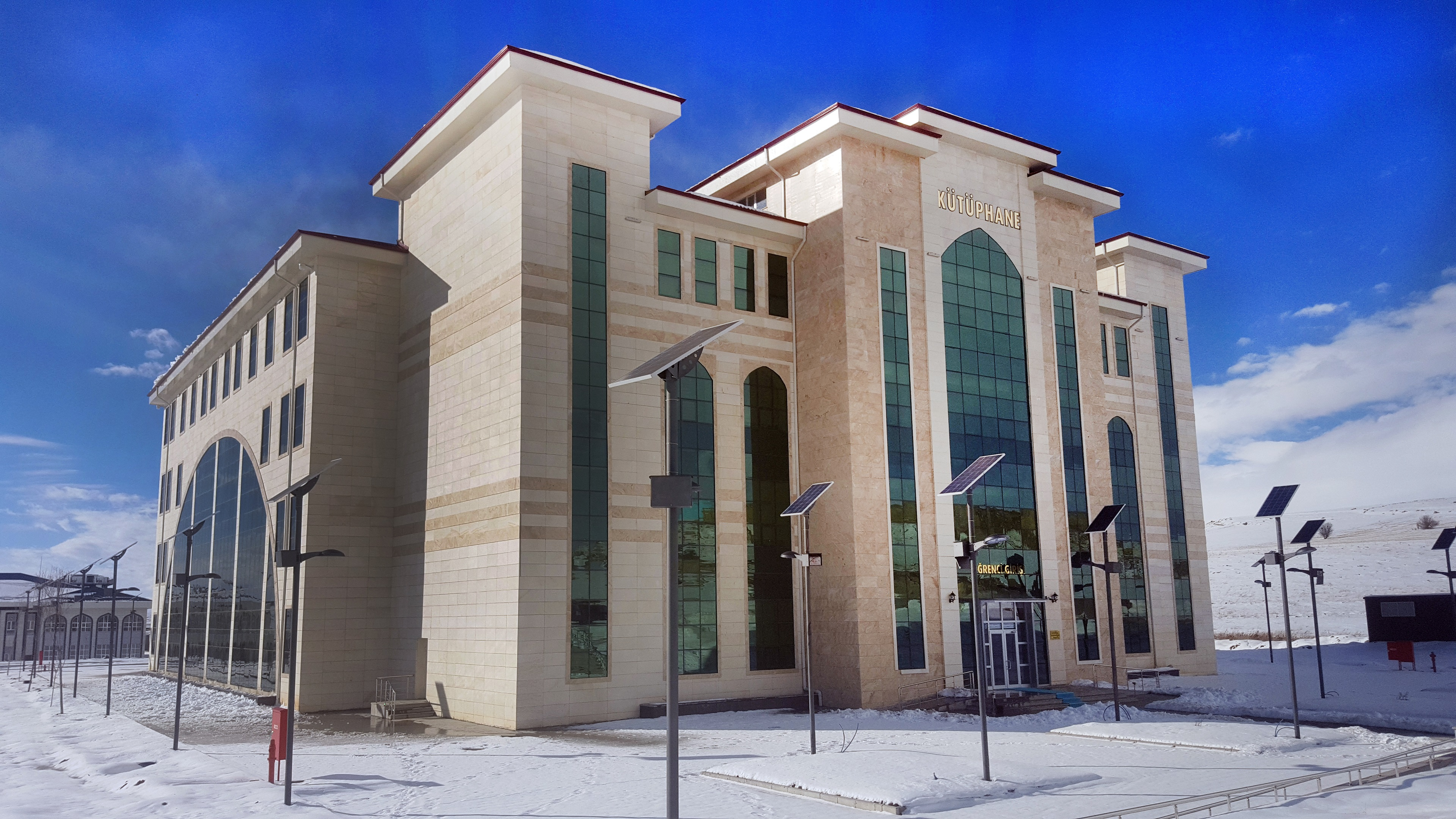
Baberti Campus Library

=== Nature ===
Bayburt has several parks and open spaces like ''Aslan dağı Ormanı'' (Lion Mount Forest), "Gençlik Parkı" (Youth Park), "Şehit Nusret Bahçesi" (Martyr Nusret Gardens), and "Yenişehir Parkı" meaning "New City Park". The city has 535.780 m^{2} (5,767.09 sq ft) of nursery areas, where young plants are raised for the forests of Bayburt. Also there are two caves that visitors can see the interesting natural shapes of the stones. These caves are "Çimağıl Cave" and "Helva Village Ice Cave".

=== Castle ===
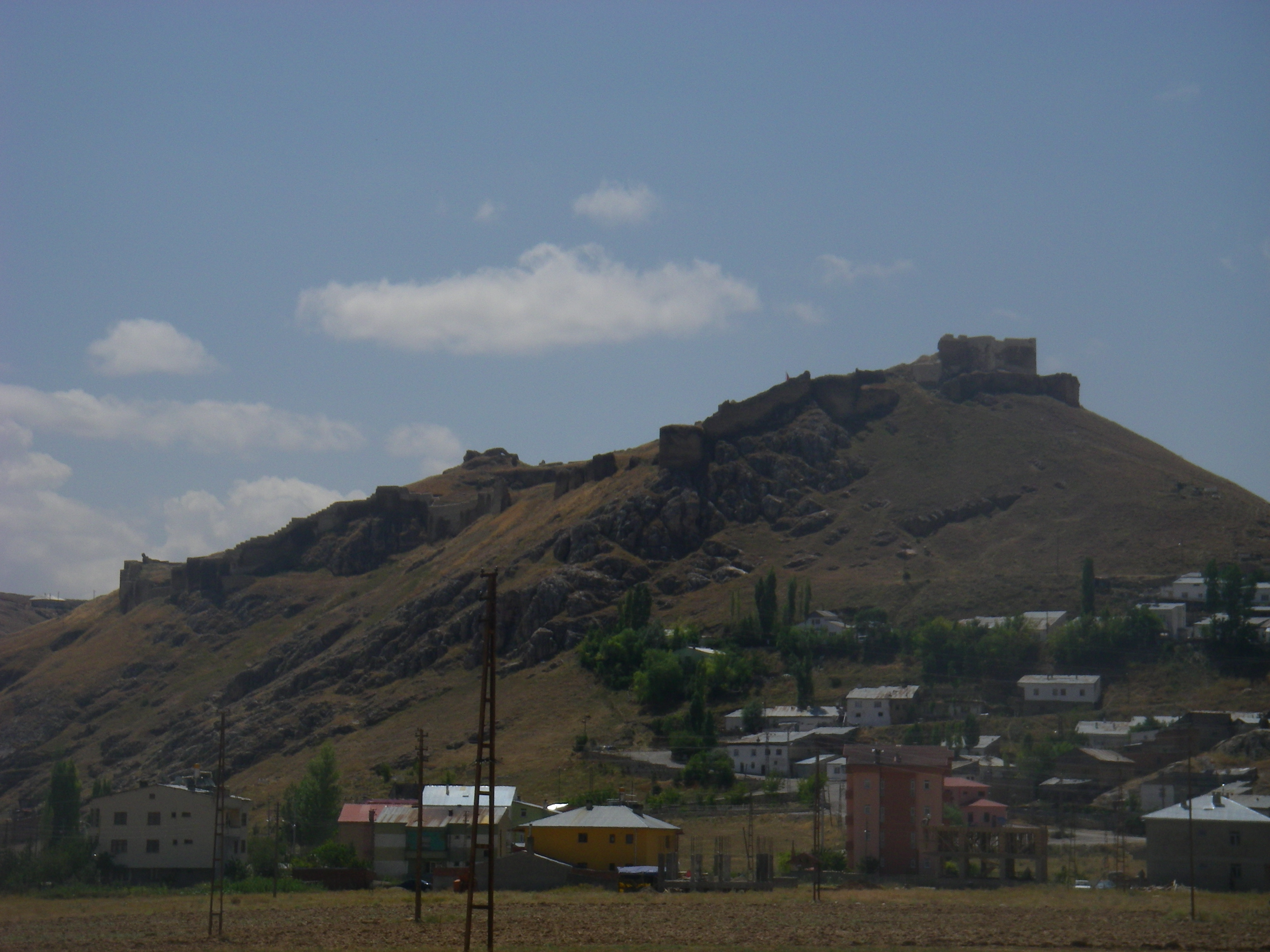
Bayburt Fortress.

Bayburt Castle stands on the steep rocks north of Bayburt. It was held by the Bagratuni dynasty in the 9th, 10th, and 11th centuries. It was completely rebuilt by the Saltukid ruler Mugis-al-Din Tugrul Sah between 1200 and 1230, as attested by an inscription in the walls of the castle. The massive size of its walls and the quality of its masonry place it amongst the finest of all the castles in Anatolia but for its destruction by the Russians during the early nineteenth century. Rebuilding was done during the Ottoman period. The castle was inhabited until it was destroyed in 1829.

=== Aydıntepe Underground City ===
Located 45 km (28 mi) from Bayburt, the Aydıntepe underground City consists of rock-cut galleries, vaulted rooms and wider spaces excavated out of natural rock, without using any building material within 2–2.5 metres (6 ft 7 in – 8 ft 2 in) from the surface in the tuff. Vaulted galleries about one meter wide and 2 to 2.5 meters tall are expanding on both sides.

=== The Dome of Dede Korkut ===
The Dome of Dede Korkut is approximately 30 kilometres (19 mi) away from Bayburt, and is located in Masat village. It is located in the middle of village's graveyard, has been hosting plenty of people from many countries including Turkic countries because of Dede Korkut Culture and Art Festival since 1995, and it is held every July. The dome, also known as Ali Baba and Korkut Ata, was restored in 1994, and it was released to the public. It has gained importance after has been included in the Representative List of the Intangible Cultural Heritage of Humanity of UNESCO in November 2018.

=== Baksı Museum ===
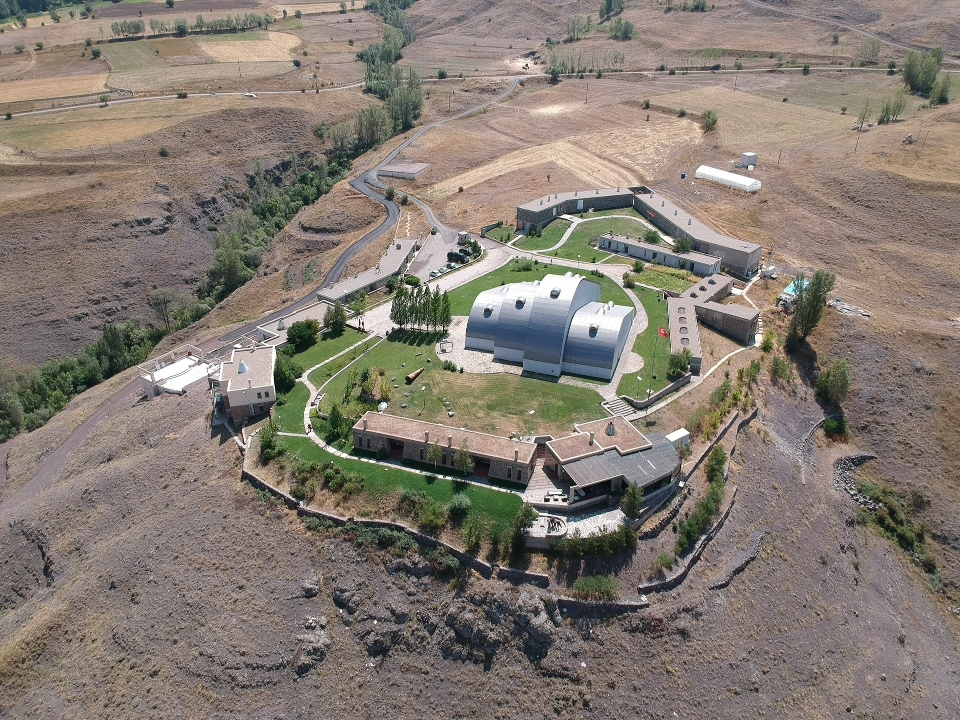
Baksı Museum.

The Baksı Museum stands near the Black Sea, 45 km (28 mi) from Bayburt on a hilltop overlooking the Çoruh Valley. Rising in what used to be called Baksı and is now the village of Bayraktar, this unusual museum offers contemporary art and traditional handicrafts side by side under one roof.

== Sport ==
There is a professional football stadium in the city and many private astroturfed sites. The local football club in Bayburt is Bayburt Özel İdarespor, which currently competes in the TFF Second League. Şalcilarspor played in the Third League between 1986 and 1988.

There are many indoor swimming pools in Bayburt, among them the semi-olympic swimming pool is the most notable one. It is located in the city center opposite of the Yenişehir Park. The pool water is kept at the same temperature in summer and winter so that the users can enjoy the pool in the best possible way.

The city also hosts winter sport activities, such as skiing. Ski resorts are located away from the city center.

== Education ==
Bayburt University is located roughly one kilometer away from the center of the city, the university has several faculties such as Engineering, Arts and Sciences, and Administrative Sciences. The university also contains a guest house (Turkish: konukevi). There are several vocational schools.

== Transportation ==
Bayburt Bus Terminal, located in the south of the city, is the main transportation hub of Bayburt.

== Notable people ==
- Bayburtlu Kara Ibrahim Pasha, Grand Vizier of the Ottoman Empire, 1683 to 1685.
- Hovhannes XI (Çamaşırciyan), Armenian Patriarch of Constantinople between 1800 and 1801
- İrşadi Baba, (1879-1958), folk poet
- Krikor Amirian (1888–1964), Armenian Revolutionary
- Namık Kemal Zeybek (born 1944), Turkish politician
- Vasip Şahin (born 1964), Turkish civil servant, the Governor of Ankara Province.
- Naci Ağbal (born 1968), Turkish politician
- Suat Türker (1976–2023), Turkish-German footballer
- Serdar Orçin (born 1976), Turkish actor
- Hakan Çalhanoğlu (born 1994), Turkish footballer

== Twin cities ==
Bayburt is twinned with:

- Ali Sabieh, Djibouti
- Domo, Ethiopia
- Mekele, Ethiopia
- Safi, Morocco
- Mohammedia, Morocco
- Magdeburg, Germany
- Roeselare, Belgium
- Schaan, Liechtenstein
- (Republic of Ireland) Limerick, Ireland
- Zaragoza, Spain
- Ipoh, Malaysia
- Varna, Bulgaria

== See also ==
- Arpalı
