= Bayburt Province =

Coordinates: 40°14′12″N 40°13′25″E

Bayburt Province Bayburt ili
- Province
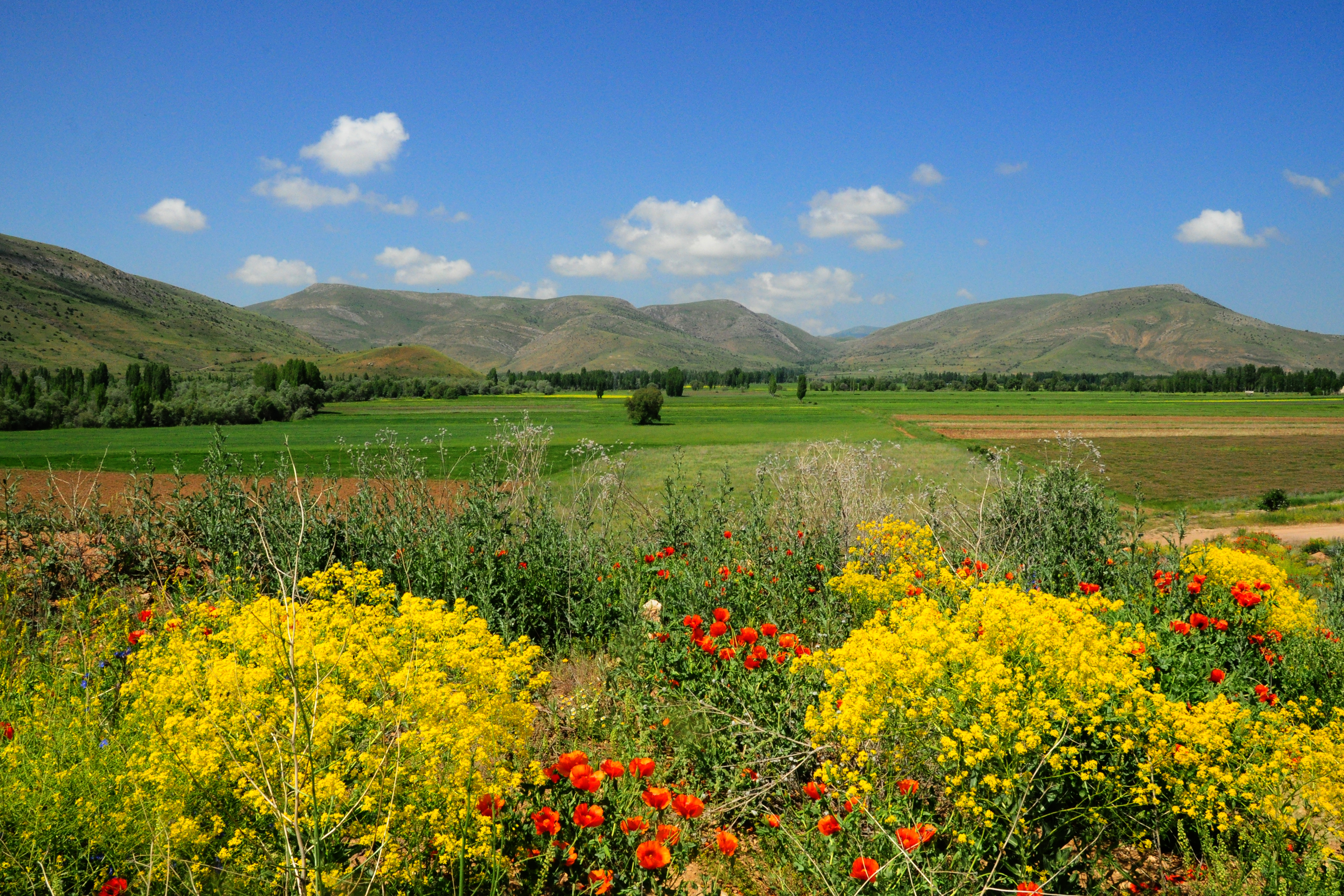
- Akşar, Bayburt.

- Location of the province within Turkey
- Country: Turkey
- Seat: Bayburt

Government
  - Governor: Mustafa Eldivan
- Area: 3,746 km^{2} (1,446 sq mi)
- Population (2022): 84,241
  - Density: 22.49/km^{2} (58.24/sq mi)
- Time zone: UTC+3 (TRT)
- Area code: 0458
- Website: www.bayburt.gov.tr

Bayburt Province (Turkish: Bayburt ili) is a province of Turkey. Located in the Northeast Anatolia region of the country, the capital city is Bayburt. Its area is 3,746 km^{2}, and its population is 84,241 (2022), making it the least-populous province in Turkey. The province was created in 1989 from part of Gümüşhane Province.

== Geography ==
Bayburt is traversed by the northeasterly line of equal latitude and longitude.

== Districts ==
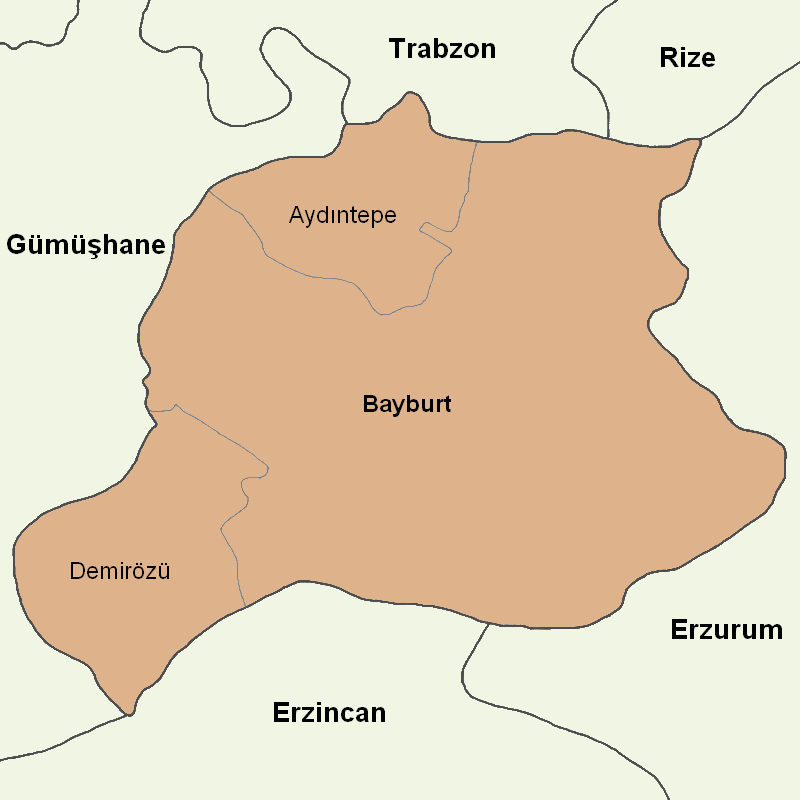

Bayburt province is divided into 3 districts (capital district in bold):

- Aydıntepe
- **Bayburt**
- Demirözü

== Historical sites, places and museums ==
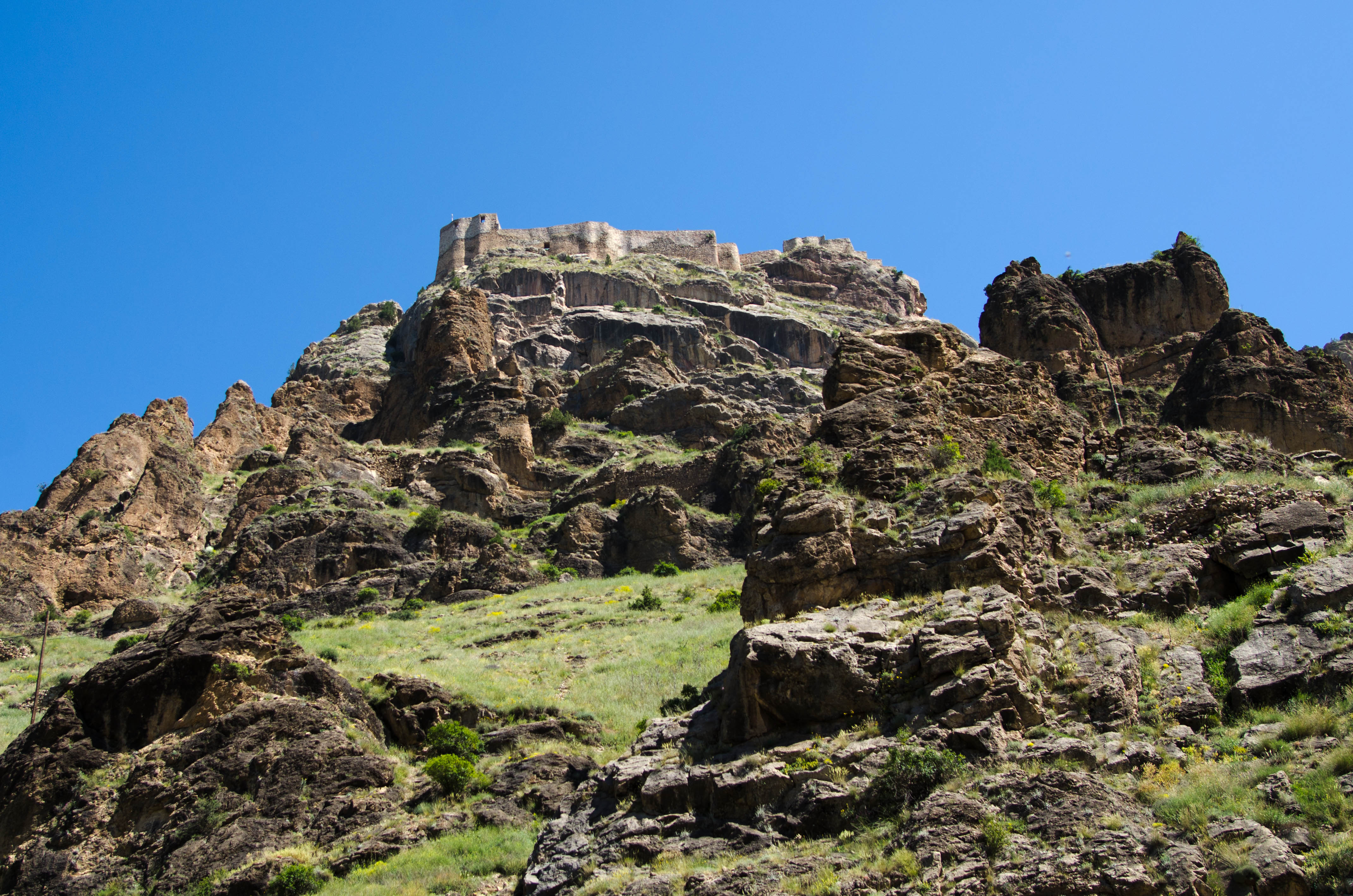
Goat castle in Bayburt Province.

The most important places in Bayburt Province are:

- Bayburt Tower
- Saruhan Tower
- Aydıntepe underground city
- Mausoleum of Dede Korkut
- Mausoleum of Şehit Osman
- Traditional Bayburt houses
- Ulu Mosque
- Pulur (Gökçedere) Ferahşat Bey Mosque
- Sünür (Çayıryolu) Kutlu Bey Mosque
- Yukarı Hınzeverek (Çatalçeşme) Mosque
- Bedesten (covered bazaar)
- Varzahan Armenian Church
- Baksi Art Museum
- Bayburt Museum
- Kenan Yavuz Etnograpia Museum

== Cities and towns ==
- Bayburt City 32,141 inh.
- Aydıntepe City 2,663 inh.
- Gökçedere Town 2,389 inh.
- Demirözü City 2,137 inh.
- Arpalı Town 1,934 inh.
- Konursu Town 1,569 inh.

== Climate ==
The climate is described as Humid Continental by the Köppen Climate System, abbreviated as Dfb.

== See also ==
- 1993 Bayburt Üzengili avalanche
- Arpalı Kasabası
- List of populated places in Bayburt Province
