= Dumlu =

Dumlu may refer to:

- Dumlu, Aydıntepe, a village in the district of Aydıntepe, Bayburt Province, Turkey
- Dumlu, Ceyhan, a village in the district of Ceyhan, Adana Province, Turkey
- Dumlu, Kahta, a village in the district of Kahta, Adıyaman Province, Turkey
