= Çiğdemlik =

Çiğdemlik can refer to:

- Çiğdemlik, Amasya
- Çiğdemlik, Aydıntepe
- Çiğdemlik, Baskil
