= Beşikli =

Beşikli can refer to:

- Beşikli, Kahta
- Beşikli, Kemah
