= Şahintepe =

Şahintepe can refer to:

- Şahintepe, Bismil
- Şahintepe, Kahta
- Şahintepe, Kemah
