= Damlacık =

Damlacık can refer to:

- Damlacık, Kahta
- Damlacık, Tavas
