= Dutköy =

Dutköy can refer to:

- Dutköy, Çorum
- Dutköy, Kahta
