= Akkavak =

Akkavak can refer to:

- Akkavak, Kahta
- Akkavak, Karaçoban
