= Çaltılı =

Çaltılı can refer to the following villages in Turkey:

- Çaltılı, Kahta
- Çaltılı, Karayazı
- Çaltılı, Mut
- Çaltılı, Savaştepe
- Çaltılı, Sındırgı
