= Sorkunlu =

Sorkunlu can refer to:

- Sorkunlu, Aziziye
- Sorkunlu, Aydıntepe
