= Mülkköy =

Mülkköy can refer to:

- Mülkköy, Kahta
- Mülkköy, İspir
- Mülkköy, Refahiye
