= Zeytinköy =

Zeytinköy (literally "olive village" in Turkish) may refer to the following places in Turkey:

- Zeytinköy, Aydın, a village in the district of Aydın, Aydın Province
- Zeytinköy, Kahta, a village in the district of Kahta, Adıyaman Province
- Zeytinköy, Koçarlı, a village in the district of Koçarlı, Aydın Province
