= Pınargözü =

Pınargözü or Pinargözü may refer to:

- Pınargözü Cave, in Isparta Province, the longest cave in Turkey
- Pınargözü, Aydıntepe, a village in Bayburt Province, Turkey
