= Arılı =

Arılı (literally "(place) with bees") is a Turkish place name that may refer to the following places in Turkey:

- Arılı, Kahta, a village in the district of Kahta, Adıyaman Province
- Arılı, Posof, a village in the district of Posof, Ardahan Province
