= Kâhta District =

- District
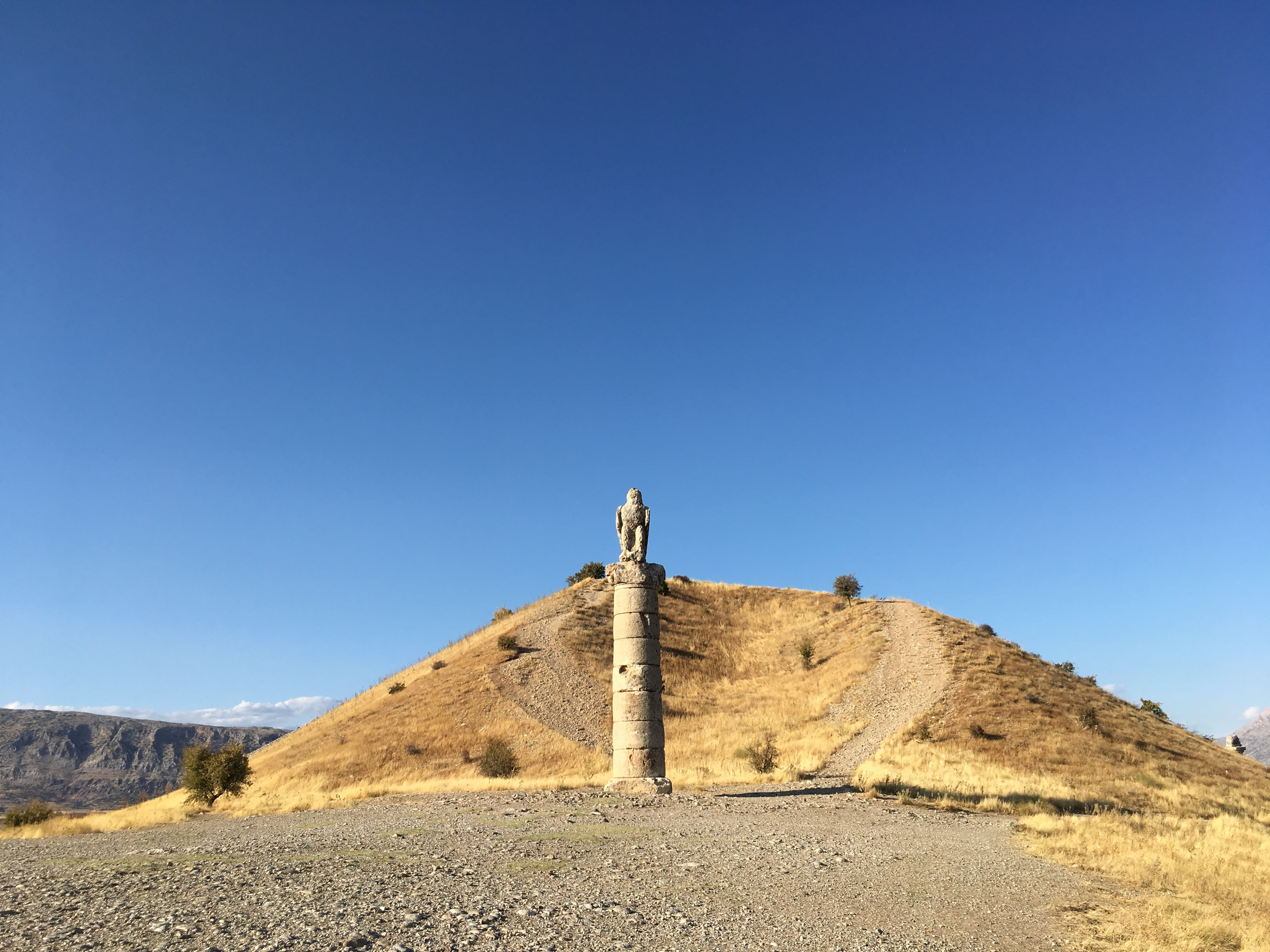
- The Karakuş Tumulus is a monumental tomb of Royal Family of Commagene located in the district.

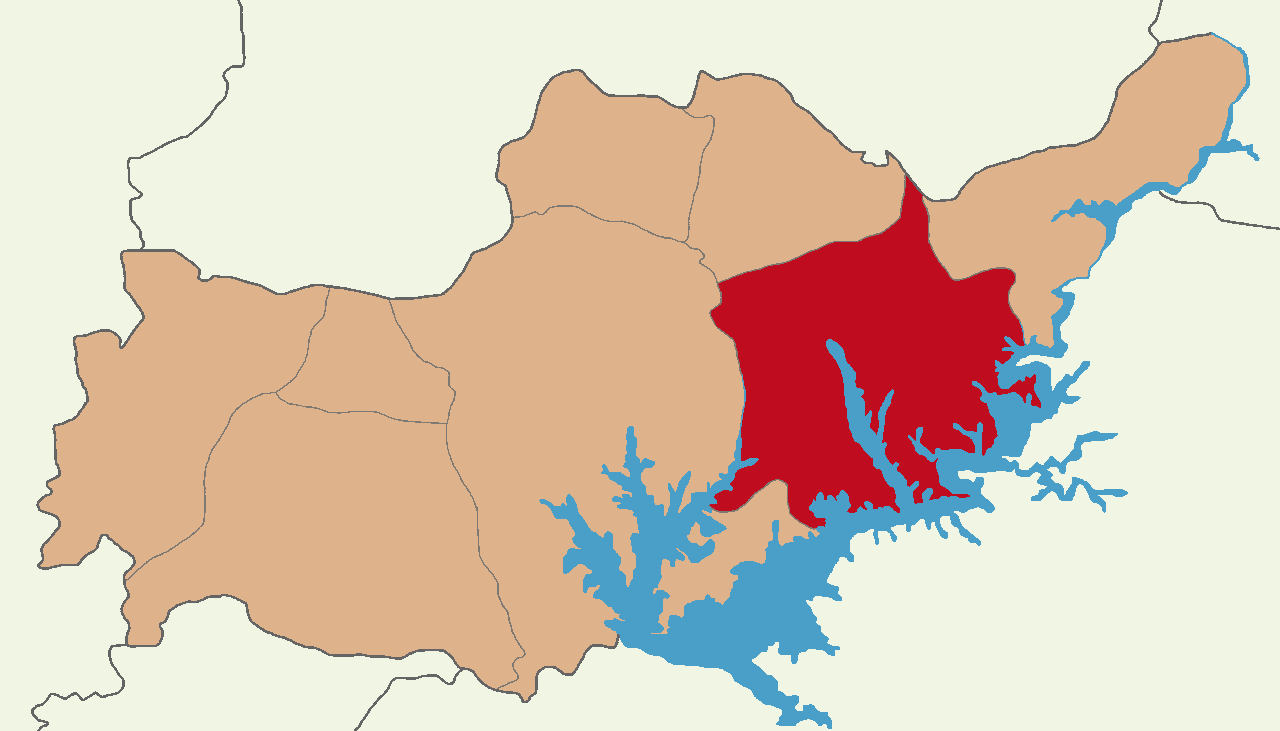
- Map showing Kâhta District in Adıyaman Province

- Location within Turkey
- Coordinates: 37°47′N 38°37′E
- Country: Turkey
- Province: Adıyaman
- Seat: Kâhta

Government
  - Kaymakam: Selami Korkutata
- Area: 1,274 km^{2} (492 sq mi)
- Population (2021): 127,534
  - Density: 100.1/km^{2} (259.3/sq mi)
- Time zone: UTC+3 (TRT)

Kâhta District is a district of Adıyaman Province of Turkey. Its seat is the town Kâhta. Its area is 1,274 km^{2}, and its population is 127,534 (2021). On 12 October 2018, cave drawings which date back to the Paleolithic era, were discovered in the Kâhta district, due to the decline of Atatürk Reservoir waters by 10–15 meters.

== Composition ==
There are 3 municipalities in Kâhta District:

- Akıncılar
- Bölükyayla
- Kâhta

There are 102 villages in Kâhta District:

- Adalı
- Akalın
- Akdoğan
- Akkavak
- Akkuş
- Aktaş
- Akyıldız
- Alidam
- Arılı
- Aydınpınar
- Bağbaşı
- Bağözü
- Ballı
- Belenli
- Belören
- Beşikli
- Boğazkaya
- Bostanlı
- Bozpınar
- Boztarla
- Burmapınar
- Büyükbağ
- Büyükbejyan
- Büyükbey
- Çakıreşme
- Çaltılı
- Çamlica
- Çardak
- Çataltepe
- Çaybaşı
- Çıralık
- Çukurtaş
- Cumhuriyet
- Damlacık
- Dardağan
- Dikenli
- Doluca
- Dumlu
- Dut
- Eceler
- Ekinci
- Elbeyi
- Erikdere
- Erikli
- Esendere
- Eski Kâhta
- Eskitaş
- Fıstıklı
- Geldibuldu
- Göçeri
- Gökçe
- Gölgeli
- Güdülge
- Güzelçay
- Habipler
- Hacıyusuf
- Hamzalar
- Hasandiğin
- Hasköy
- İkizce
- Işıktepe
- İslamköy
- Karacaören
- Karadut
- Karaman
- Karataş
- Kavaklı
- Kayadibi
- Koçtepe
- Köseler
- Kozağaç
- Menzil
- Mülk
- Narince
- Narlıdere
- Narsırtı
- Oluklu
- Ortanca
- Ovacık
- Şahintepe
- Salkımbağı
- Sarısu
- Şenköy
- Sıraca
- Sırakaya
- Susuz
- Taşlıca
- Taşlıçay
- Teğmenli
- Teknecik
- Tuğlu
- Turanlı
- Tütenocak
- Ulupınar
- Yapraklı
- Yelkovan
- Yenice
- Yenikuşak
- Yeşilkaya
- Yolaltı
- Zeytin
- Ziyaret

== Places of interest ==
- Nemrut Dağı or Mount Nemrut - now a national park, famous for the antique statuary on the summit, dating back to the Commagene Kingdom.
- Karakuş Tumulus, with a large statue of an eagle.
- Kâhta castle
- Severan Bridge, a Roman bridge.
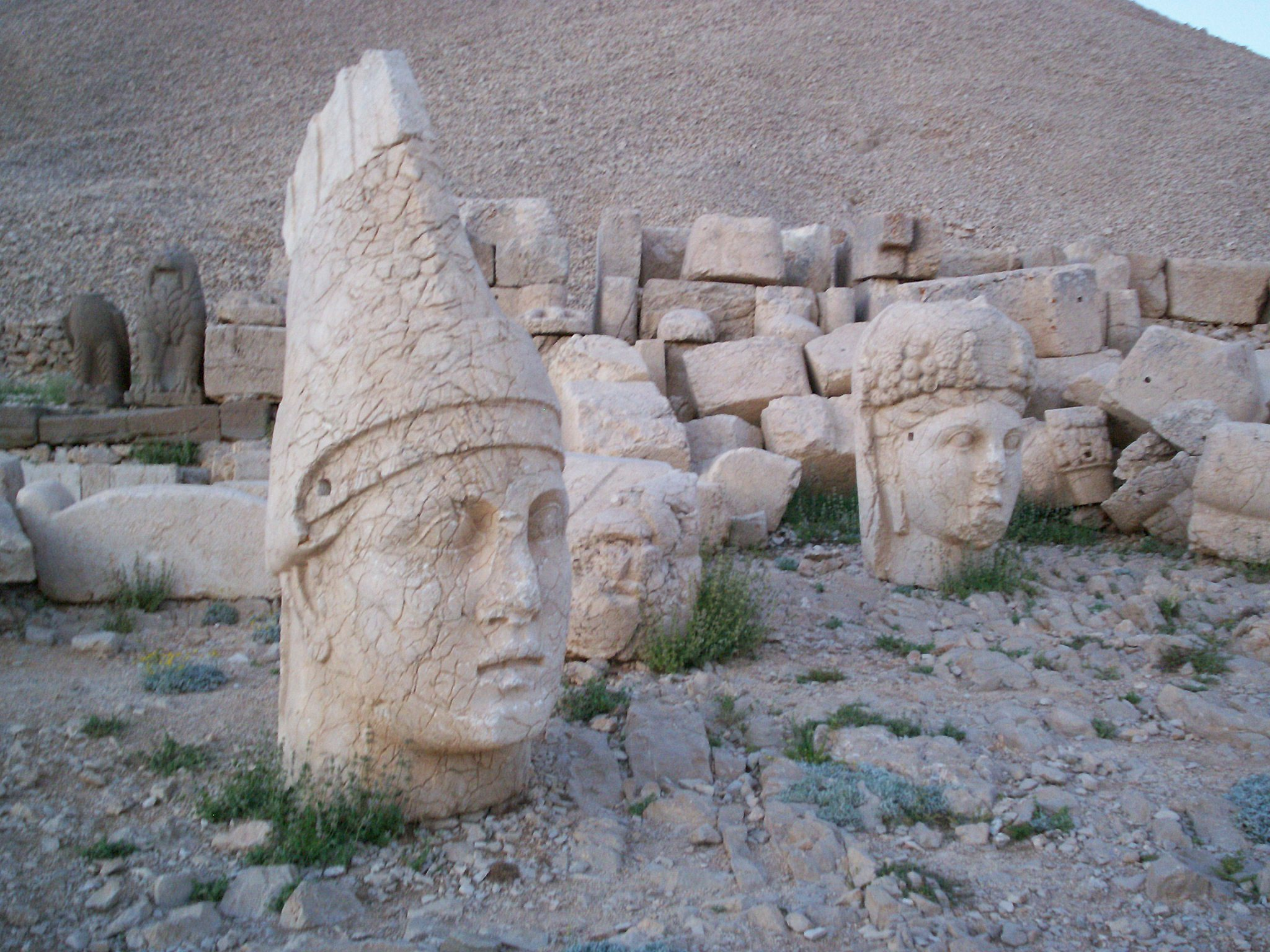
Mount Nemrut

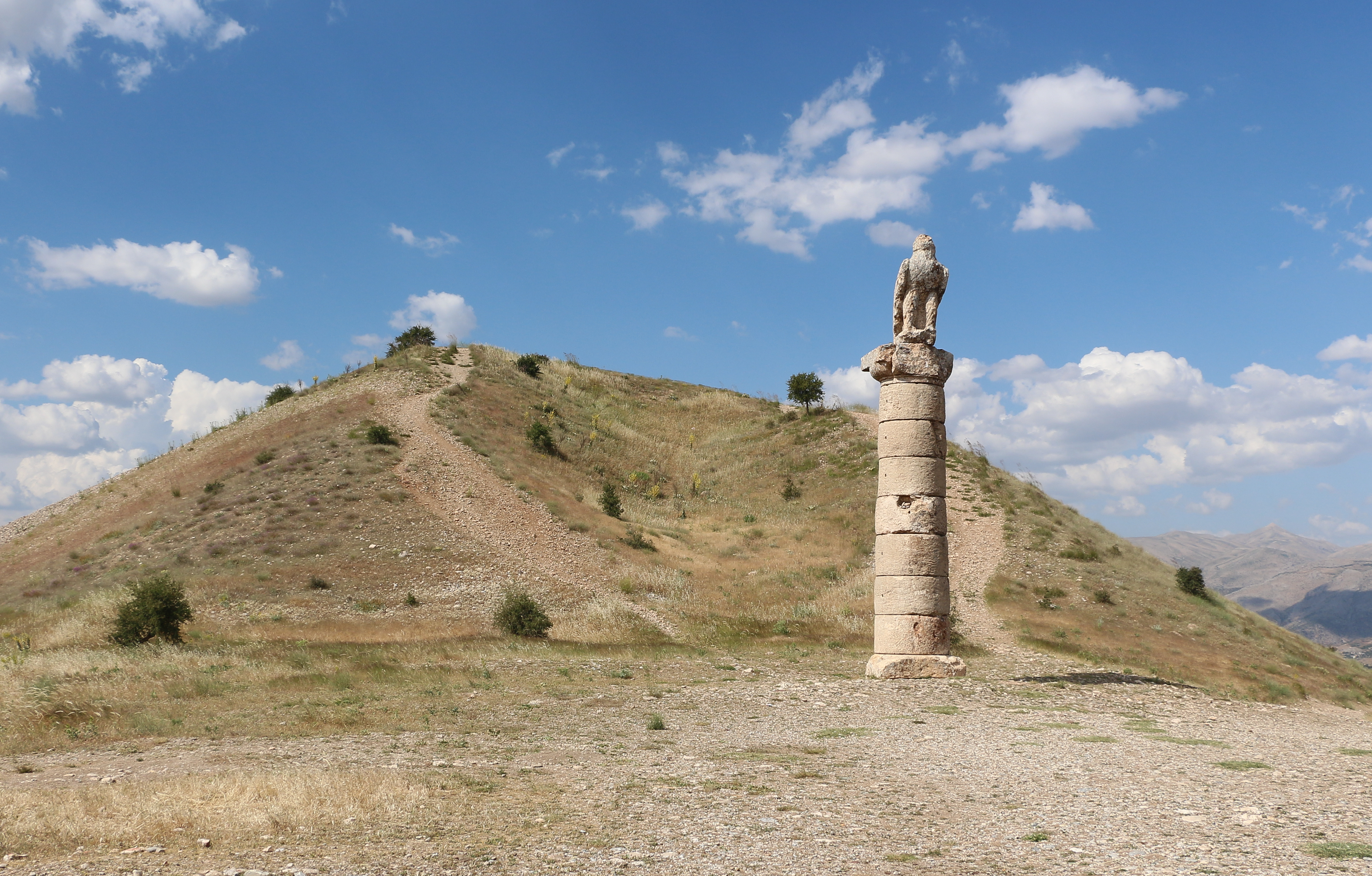
Tumulus of Karakuş

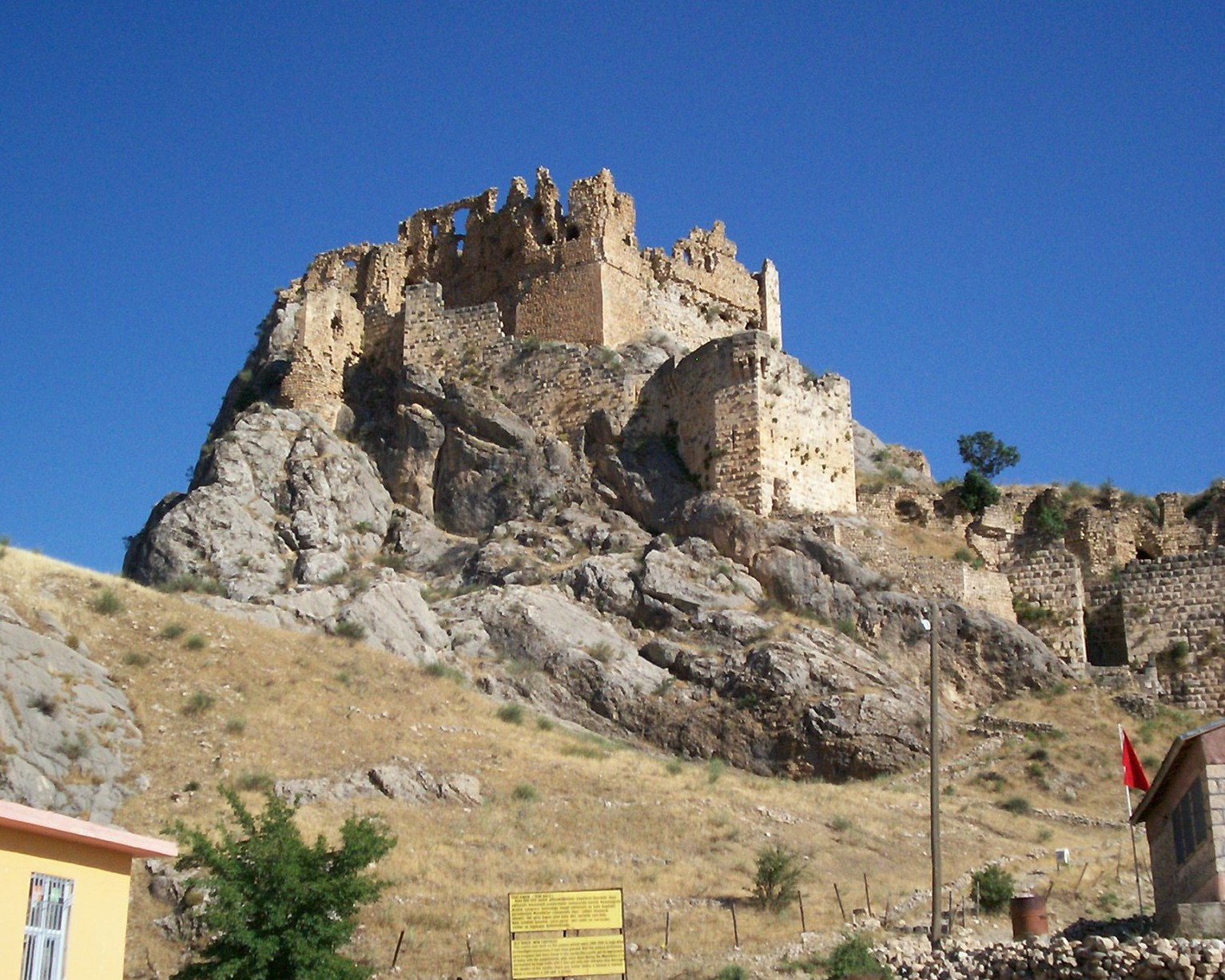
Kahta castle

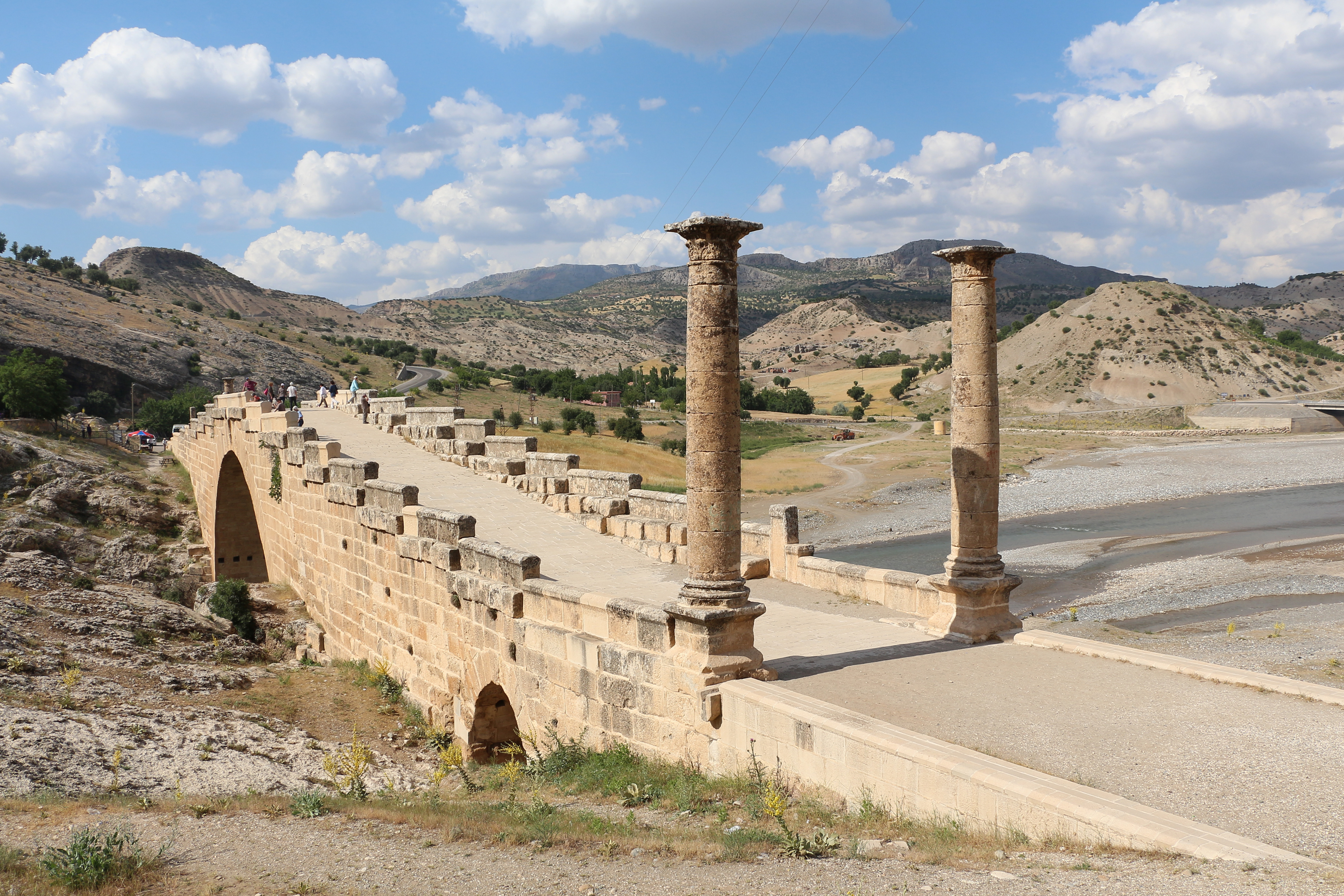
Severan Bridge
