= Habipler, Kahta =

Village in Adıyaman Province, Turkey

Habipler
- Village
- Location within Turkey
- Coordinates: 37.768°N 38.556°E
- Country: Turkey
- Province: Adıyaman
- District: Kâhta
- Population (2021): 91
- Time zone: UTC+3 (TRT)

Habipler (Kurdish: Kokelan) is a village in the Kâhta District, Adıyaman Province, Turkey. The village is populated by Kurds of the Reşwan tribe and had a population of 91 in 2021.
