= Doluca, Kahta =

Village in Adıyaman Province, Turkey

Doluca
- Village
- Location within Turkey
- Coordinates: 37.909°N 38.591°E
- Country: Turkey
- Province: Adıyaman
- District: Kâhta
- Population (2021): 577
- Time zone: UTC+3 (TRT)

Doluca (Kurdish: Kefirmê) is a village in the Kâhta District, Adıyaman Province, Turkey. The village is populated by Kurds of the Reşwan tribe and had a population of 577 in 2021.

The hamlets of Deliktaş and Yünlü are attached to the village.
