= Büyükbey, Kahta =

Village in Adıyaman Province, Turkey

Büyükbey
- Village
- Location within Turkey
- Coordinates: 37.700°N 38.559°E
- Country: Turkey
- Province: Adıyaman
- District: Kâhta
- Population (2021): 167
- Time zone: UTC+3 (TRT)

Büyükbey (Kurdish: Kirbiz) is a village in the Kâhta District, Adıyaman Province, Turkey. The village is populated by Kurds of the Bêzikan tribe and had a population of 167 in 2021.

The hamlets of Akkılıç and Meşealtı are attached to the village.
