= Eceler, Kahta =

Village in Adıyaman Province, Turkey

Eceler
- Village
- Location within Turkey
- Coordinates: 37.885°N 38.874°E
- Country: Turkey
- Province: Adıyaman
- District: Kâhta
- Population (2021): 169
- Time zone: UTC+3 (TRT)

Eceler (Kurdish: Çepek) is a village in the Kâhta District, Adıyaman Province, Turkey. The village is populated by Kurds of the Mirdêsan tribe and had a population of 169 in 2021.

The hamlets of Küçük Eceler, Öcek and Samanlı (Gerbû) are attached to the village.
