= Aydıntepe underground City =

Ancient city in Bayburt Province, Turkey

Aydıntepe underground city
- Aydıntepe Yeraltı Şehri
- Location of Aydıntepe in Turkey.
- 40°23′18″N 40°09′02″E
- Type: Underground city
- Location: Aydıntepe, Bayburt Province, Turkey
- Region: Black Sea Region

History
- Built: 3,000 years ago
- Abandoned: yes

Site notes
- Material: Volcanic tufa rock
- Height: 2 m (6.6 ft)
- Length: 1 km (0.62 mi)
- Excavation dates: 1988–2008
- Management: Aydıntepe Municipality
- Public access: yes

The Aydıntepe underground City (Turkish: Aydıntepe Yeraltı Şehri) is an ancient underground city in Aydıntepe district of Bayburt Province, Turkey. It is located 25 km (16 mi) northwest of Bayburt beneath a residential area.

== Description ==
Discovered by coincidence during excavation works for a hotel building construction in 1988 by Hasbi Okumuş, -to some sources in 1998– the underground city at Aydıntepe features chambers, halls and hallways carved out of volcanic tufa rock formation without using building materials. It is situated 2–5 m (6.6–16.4 ft) under the surface. The chambers and the halls are connected with 1 m (3.3 ft)-wide and 2 m (6.6 ft)-high hallways stretching over about 1 km (0.62 mi) in length. There are eight conical shafts over the hallways, which are believed to be for observation or ventilation purposes. Some original entrances and structures are now inaccessible because of collapse or later construction.

A round rock piece of 1.5 m (4.9 ft) diameter stands as a door at the entrance to close the underground city from the outer world when needed. The tombs above the underground city and the wall figures inside it point out to a history of three millennia including the Late Roman or early Byzantine era. It was used by Christians as well as by Muslims. Various people sheltered in the city at different times, hiding from religious persecution or war. Inside the underground city, there are cellars, storage rooms, water sources, and a pool. The city was well-fortified while still in use; it once housed a closing device and guard chamber.

The site was archaeologically researched, and was put under protection by the Cultural and Natural Heritage Preservation Board in 2008. About 850 m (2,790 ft) long part of the underground city covering an area of 1,200 m^{2} (13,000 sq ft) is open to the public for visit.
