= Eskitaş, Kahta =

Village in Adıyaman Province, Turkey

Eskitaş
- Village
- Location within Turkey
- Coordinates: 37.684°N 38.765°E
- Country: Turkey
- Province: Adıyaman
- District: Kâhta
- Population (2021): 510
- Time zone: UTC+3 (TRT)

Eskitaş (Kurdish: Encoz) is a village in the Kâhta District of Adıyaman Province in Turkey. The village is populated by Kurds of the Gewozî and Kawan tribes and had a population of 510 in 2021.

The hamlets of Kaynarca and Sırmalı are attached to the village.
