= Erikdibi, Aydıntepe =

Erikdibi
- Village
- Location within Turkey
- Coordinates: 40°26′N 40°15′E
- Country: Turkey
- Province: Bayburt
- District: Aydıntepe
- Population (2021): 221
- Time zone: UTC+3 (TRT)

Erikdibi is a village in the Aydıntepe District, Bayburt Province, Turkey. Its population is 221 (2021).

== History ==
The former name of the village was Pağnik.
