= Akyıldız, Kahta =

Village in Adıyaman Province, Turkey

Akyıldız
- Village
- Location within Turkey
- Coordinates: 37.826°N 38.864°E
- Country: Turkey
- Province: Adıyaman
- District: Kâhta
- Population (2021): 216
- Time zone: UTC+3 (TRT)

Akyıldız (Kurdish: Titan) is a village in the Kâhta District of Adıyaman Province in Turkey. The village is populated by Kurds of the Canbegan tribe and had a population of 216 in 2021.
