= Güdülge, Kahta =

Village in Adıyaman Province, Turkey

Güdülge
- Village
- Location within Turkey
- Coordinates: 37.737°N 38.754°E
- Country: Turkey
- Province: Adıyaman
- District: Kâhta
- Population (2021): 583
- Time zone: UTC+3 (TRT)

Güdülge (Kurdish: Gudilge) is a village in the Kâhta District, Adıyaman Province, Turkey. The village is populated by Kurds of the Gewozî and Kawan tribes and had a population of 53 in 2021.

The hamlets of Bayramlar, Karakoç and Karamağara are attached to Güdülge.
