= Yukarıkırzı, Aydıntepe =

Yukarıkırzı
- Village
- Location within Turkey
- Coordinates: 40°23′N 40°05′E
- Country: Turkey
- Province: Bayburt
- District: Aydıntepe
- Population (2021): 351
- Time zone: UTC+3 (TRT)

Yukarıkırzı is a village in the Aydıntepe District, Bayburt Province, Turkey. Its population is 351 (2021).
