= Ovacık, Kahta =

Village in Adıyaman Province, Turkey

Ovacık
- Village
- Location within Turkey
- Coordinates: 37.648°N 38.489°E
- Country: Turkey
- Province: Adıyaman
- District: Kâhta
- Population (2021): 58
- Time zone: UTC+3 (TRT)

Ovacık (Kurdish: Dudin) is a village in the Kâhta District, Adıyaman Province, Turkey. The village is populated by Kurds of the Bezikan tribe, and had a population of 58 in 2021.
