= Erikdere, Kahta =

Village in Adıyaman Province, Turkey

Erikdere
- Village
- Location within Turkey
- Coordinates: 37.832°N 38.627°E
- Country: Turkey
- Province: Adıyaman
- District: Kâhta
- Population (2021): 359
- Time zone: UTC+3 (TRT)

Erikdere (Kurdish: Terpal) is a village in the Kâhta District, Adıyaman Province, Turkey. The village is populated by Kurds of the Reşwan tribe and had a population of 359 in 2021.

The hamlets of Tekeli and Uncular are attached to Erikdere.
