= Şalcılar, Aydıntepe =

Şalcılar
- Village
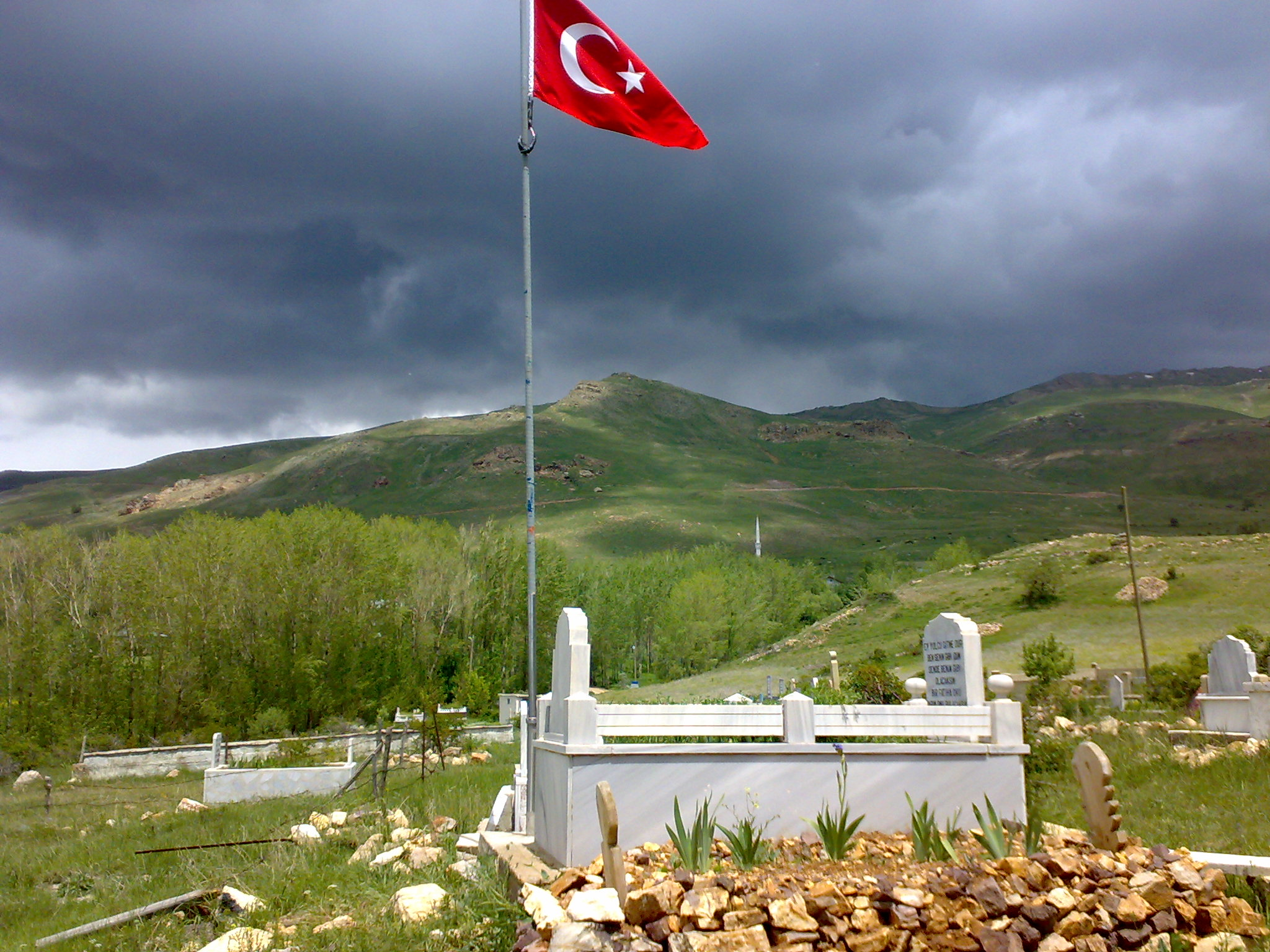
- Cemetery in the area

- Location within Turkey
- Coordinates: 40°26′N 40°06′E
- Country: Turkey
- Province: Bayburt
- District: Aydıntepe
- Population (2021): 132
- Time zone: UTC+3 (TRT)

Şalcılar is a village in the Aydıntepe District, Bayburt Province, Turkey. Its population is 132 (2021).

== History ==
The former name of the village was Hapuşki.
