= Dardağan, Kahta =

Village in Adıyaman Province, Turkey

Dardağan
- Village
- Location within Turkey
- Coordinates: 37.6674°N 38.7810°E
- Country: Turkey
- Province: Adıyaman
- District: Kâhta
- Population (2021): 259
- Time zone: UTC+3 (TRT)

Dardağan (Kurdish: Dardaxan) is a village in the Kâhta District, Adıyaman Province, Turkey. The village is populated by Kurds of the Gewozî and Kawan tribes and had a population of 259 in 2021.

The hamlets of Esentepe, Mahmudiye and Tanıklı are attached to the village.
