= Yenikuşak, Kahta =

Village in Adıyaman Province, Turkey

Yenikuşak
- Village
- Location within Turkey
- Coordinates: 37.665°N 38.800°E
- Country: Turkey
- Province: Adıyaman
- District: Kâhta
- Population (2021): 145
- Time zone: UTC+3 (TRT)

Yenikuşak (Kurdish: Xurêş) is a village in the Kâhta District, Adıyaman Province, Turkey. The village is populated by Kurds of the Kawan tribe and had a population of 145 in 2021.

The hamlet of Hüseyinli is attached to the village.
