= Hasandiğin, Kahta =

Village in Adıyaman Province, Turkey

Hasandiğin
- Village
- Location within Turkey
- Coordinates: 37.802°N 38.686°E
- Country: Turkey
- Province: Adıyaman
- District: Kâhta
- Population (2021): 202
- Time zone: UTC+3 (TRT)

Hasandiğin (Kurdish: Hesendigin) is a village in the Kâhta District, Adıyaman Province, Turkey. The village is populated by Kurds of the Reşwan tribe and had a population of 202 in 2021.

The hamlet of Narlı is attached to the village.
