= Karakuş Tumulus =

Mausoleum in Turkey

Coordinates: 37°52′10″N 38°35′17″E

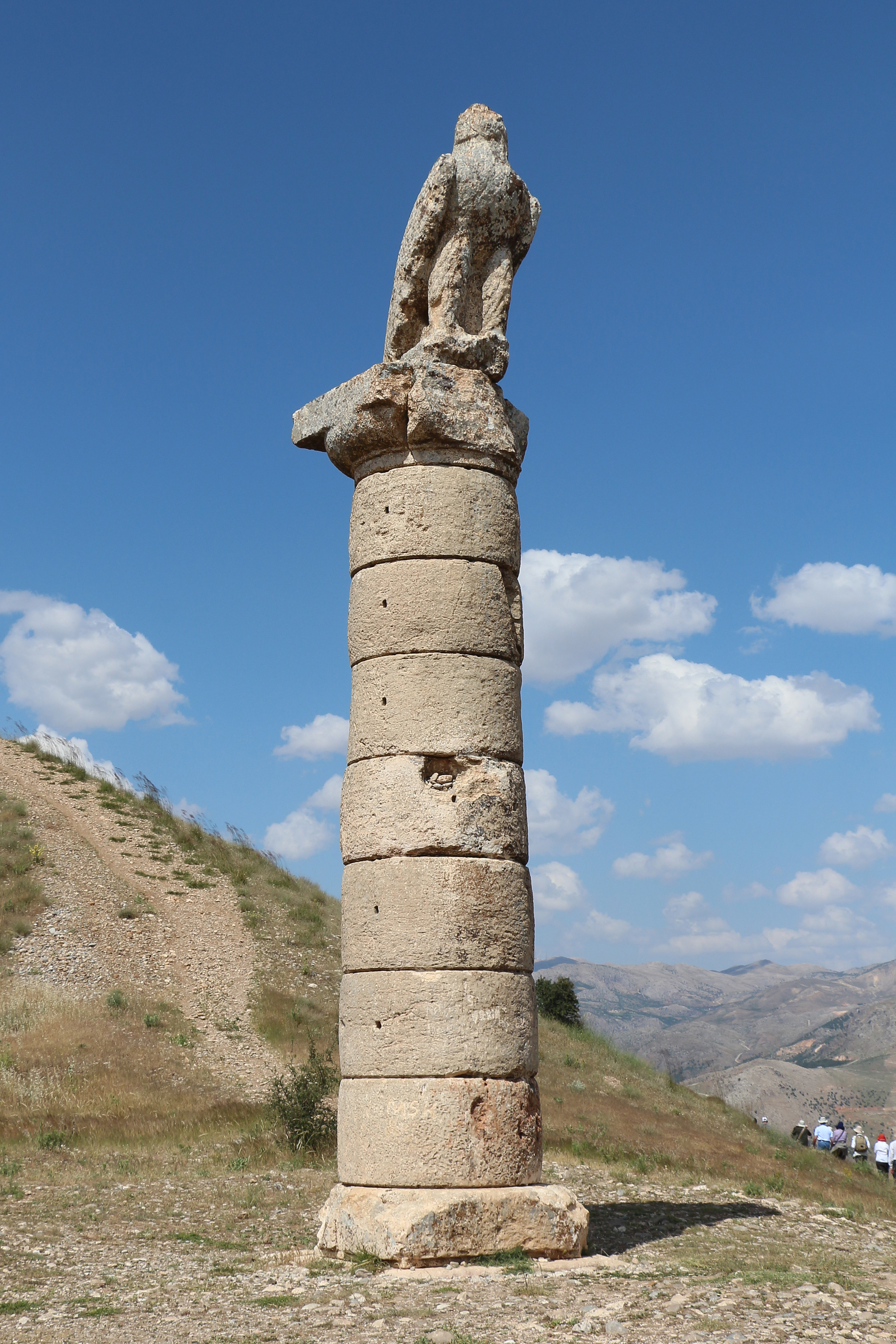
Eagle-topped column

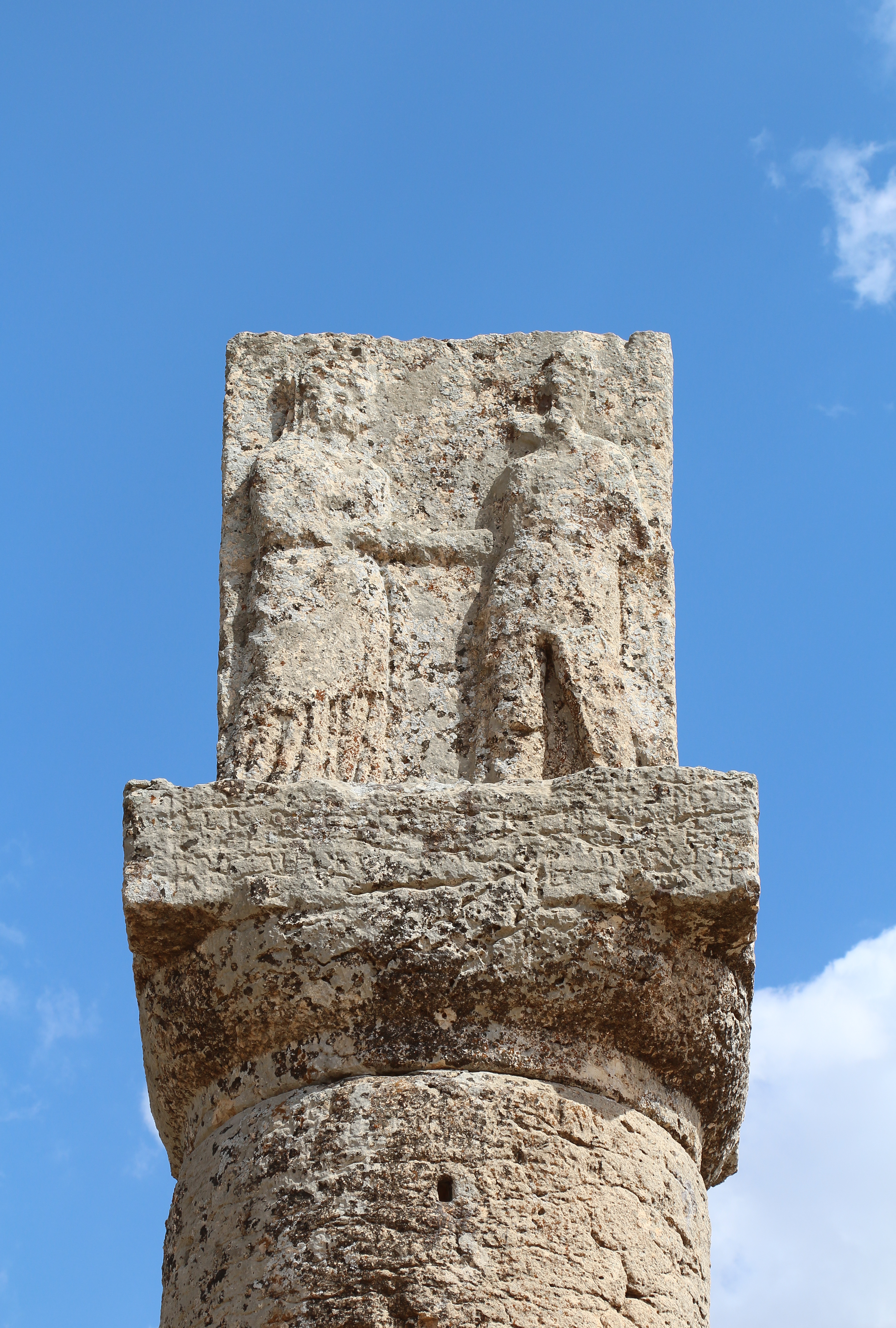
Relief of Mithridates II and his sister Laodice

The Karakuş Tumulus (also Karakush) is a funerary monument—a hierothesion—for Queen Isias and Princesses Antiochis and Aka I of Commagene, built by Mithridates II of Commagene in 30–20 BCE, near the modern village of Çukurtaş in Kâhta District, Adıyaman Province, Turkey.

Karakuş means "black bird". The monument received this name because there is a column topped by an eagle.

It is located 12 kilometres (7.5 mi) from Kâhta, Turkey. The tumulus is surrounded by groups of three Doric columns, each about 9 metres (30 ft) high. The columns are topped with steles, reliefs and statues of a bull, lion and eagle. An inscription indicates the presence of a royal tomb that housed three women.

The monument has Greek honorific inscriptions on the external faces of the two drums of the central column of the northeast. Skipping a couple of phrases where restoration has been doubtful, the inscription reads:

This is the hierothesion [sacred site or foundation] of Isias, whom the great King Mithridates (she being his own mother) … deemed worthy of this final hour. And … Antiochis lies herein, the king’s sister by the same mother, the most beautiful of women, whose life was short but her honours long-enduring. Both of these, as you see, preside here, and with them a daughter’s daughter, the daughter of Antiochis, Aka. A memorial of life with each other and of the king’s honour.

Sometime after the Kingdom of Commagene was annexed in 72 CE by the Roman emperor Vespasian, the vault of the tomb was looted.

The main excavations on the site were carried out by Friedrich Karl Dörner of the University of Münster. The column collapsed in the 2023 Turkey–Syria earthquake.

== Bibliography ==
- T.A. Sinclair, Eastern Turkey: An Architectural & Archaeological Survey 4:59
- Blömer, Michael; Winter, Engelbert (2011). Commagene: The Land of the Gods between the Taurus and the Euphrates. Homer Kitabevi. ISBN 978-9944-483-35-3.
