= Belenli, Kahta =

Village in Adıyaman Province, Turkey

Belenli
- Village
- Location within Turkey
- Coordinates: 37.673°N 38.714°E
- Country: Turkey
- Province: Adıyaman
- District: Kâhta
- Population (2021): 351
- Time zone: UTC+3 (TRT)

Belenli (Kurdish: Pirot) is a village in the Kâhta District, Adıyaman Province, Turkey. The village is populated by Kurds of the Kawan tribe and had a population of 351 in 2021.

The three hamlets of Güçlü, Oğlak and Yüksekyayla are attached to Belenli.
