= Çardak, Kahta =

Village in Adıyaman Province, Turkey

Çardak
- Village
- Location within Turkey
- Coordinates: 37.823°N 38.683°E
- Country: Turkey
- Province: Adıyaman
- District: Kâhta
- Population (2021): 165
- Time zone: UTC+3 (TRT)

Çardak (Kurdish: Birîman) is a village in the Kâhta District, Adıyaman Province, Turkey. The village is populated by Kurds of the Birîman tribe and had a population of 165 in 2021.
