= Taşlıçay, Kahta =

Village in Adıyaman Province, Turkey

Taşlıçay
- Village
- Location within Turkey
- Coordinates: 37.744°N 38.784°E
- Country: Turkey
- Province: Adıyaman
- District: Kâhta
- Population (2021): 94
- Time zone: UTC+3 (TRT)

Taşlıçay (Kurdish: Hayik) is a village in the Kâhta District, Adıyaman Province, Turkey. The village is populated by Kurds of the Gewozî and Kawan tribes and had a population of 94 in 2021.
