= Büyükbejyan, Kahta =

Village in Adıyaman Province, Turkey

Büyükbejyan
- Village
- Location within Turkey
- Coordinates: 37.683°N 38.688°E
- Country: Turkey
- Province: Adıyaman
- District: Kâhta
- Population (2021): 166
- Time zone: UTC+3 (TRT)

Büyükbejyan is a village in the Kâhta District of Adıyaman Province in Turkey. The village is populated by Kurds of the Bezikan tribe and had a population of 166 in 2021.
