= Yolaltı, Kahta =

Village in Adıyaman Province, Turkey

Yolaltı
- Village
- Location within Turkey
- Coordinates: 37.897°N 38.632°E
- Country: Turkey
- Province: Adıyaman
- District: Kâhta
- Population (2021): 564
- Time zone: UTC+3 (TRT)

Yolaltı (Kurdish: Postîn) is a village in the Kâhta District, Adıyaman Province, Turkey. The village is populated by Kurds of the Reşwan tribe and had a population of 564 in 2021.

The hamlet of Erler is attached to the village.
