= Hamzalar, Kahta =

Village in Adıyaman Province, Turkey

Hamzalar
- Village
- Location within Turkey
- Coordinates: 37.672°N 38.774°E
- Country: Turkey
- Province: Adıyaman
- District: Kâhta
- Population (2021): 222
- Time zone: UTC+3 (TRT)

Hamzalar is a village in the Kâhta District of Adıyaman Province in Turkey. The village is populated by Kurds of the Kawan tribe and had a population of 222 in 2021.

The hamlet of Ödemiş is attached to the village.
