= Eski Kâhta =

Village in Adıyaman Province, Turkey

- Village
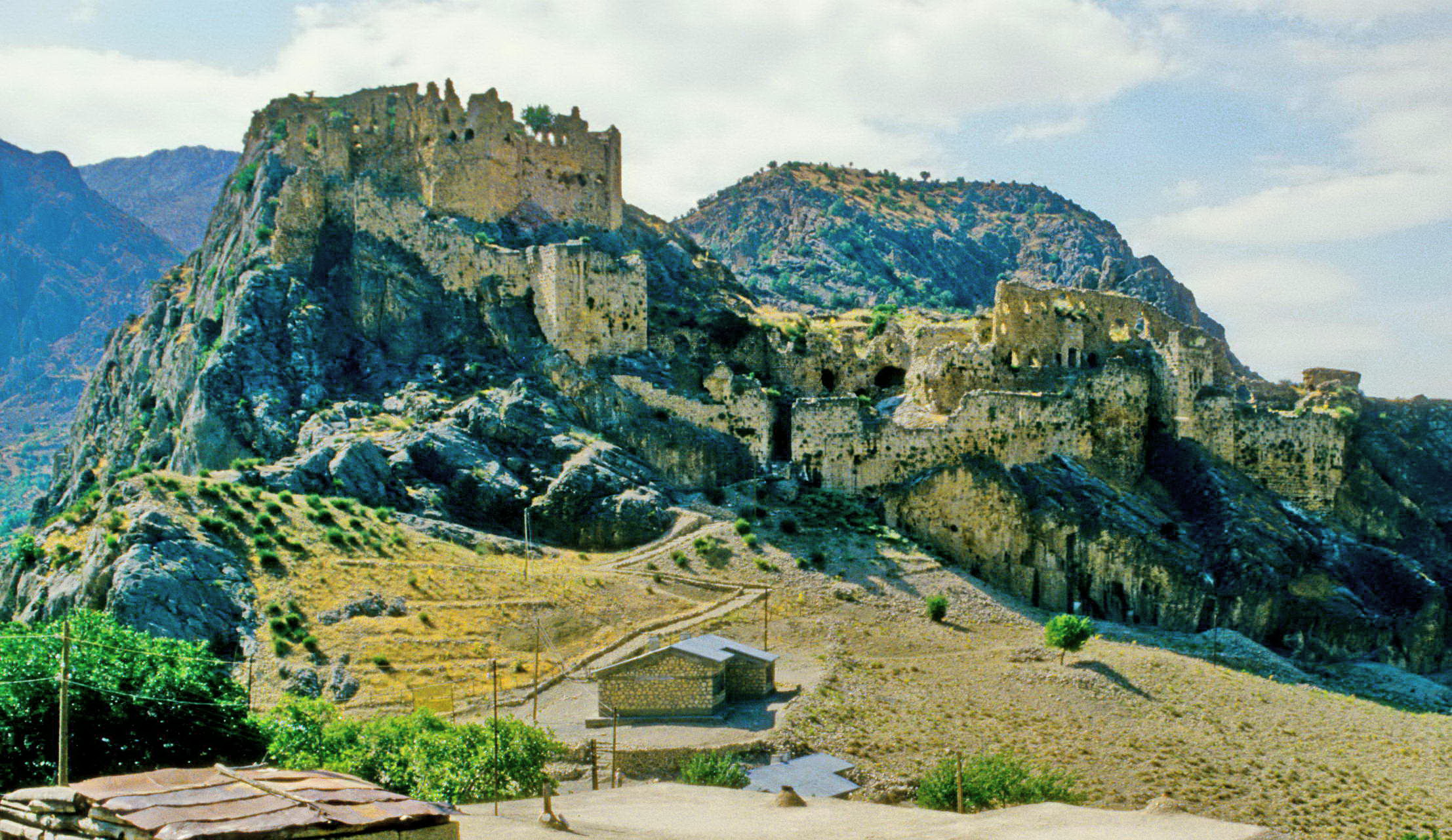
- Eski Kahta castle

- Location within Turkey
- Coordinates: 37°57′N 38°39′E
- Country: Turkey
- Province: Adıyaman
- District: Kâhta
- Population (2021): 327
- Time zone: UTC+3 (TRT)

Eski Kâhta, formerly Kocahisar, is a village in the Kâhta District, Adıyaman Province, Turkey. The village is populated by Kurds of the Reşwan tribe and had a population of 327 in 2021.

The hamlets of Boğaz, Emekli and Konuklar are attached to Eski Kâhta.
