= Çakıreşme, Kahta =

Village in Adıyaman Province, Turkey

Çakıreşme
- Village
- Location within Turkey
- Coordinates: 37.641°N 38.687°E
- Country: Turkey
- Province: Adıyaman
- District: Kâhta
- Population (2021): 71
- Time zone: UTC+3 (TRT)

Çakıreşme (Kurdish: Kosan) is a village in the Kâhta District, Adıyaman Province, Turkey. The village is populated by Kurds of the Bêzikan tribe and had a population of 167 in 2021.

The hamlets of Alaköprü, Göçen, Karaca and Kumluca are attached to the village.
