= Büyükbağ, Kahta =

Village in Adıyaman Province, Turkey

Büyükbağ
- Village
- Location within Turkey
- Coordinates: 37.819°N 38.710°E
- Country: Turkey
- Province: Adıyaman
- District: Kâhta
- Population (2021): 363
- Time zone: UTC+3 (TRT)

Büyükbağ (Kurdish: Bûtbax) is a village in the Kâhta District, Adıyaman Province, Turkey. The village is populated by Kurds of the Kawan tribe and had a population of 363 in 2021.

The hamlet of Şahnekent is attached to the village.
