= Susuz, Kahta =

Village in Adıyaman Province, Turkey

Susuz
- Village
- Location within Turkey
- Coordinates: 37.641°N 38.736°E
- Country: Turkey
- Province: Adıyaman
- District: Kâhta
- Population (2021): 60
- Time zone: UTC+3 (TRT)

Susuz (Kurdish: Bejan) is a village in the Kâhta District, Adıyaman Province, Turkey. The village is populated by Kurds of the Kawan tribe and had a population of 60 in 2021.
