= Belören, Kahta =

Village in Adıyaman Province, Turkey

Belören
- Village
- Location within Turkey
- Coordinates: 37.6354°N 38.5905°E
- Country: Turkey
- Province: Adıyaman
- District: Kâhta
- Population (2021): 450
- Time zone: UTC+3 (TRT)

Belören (Kurdish: Bêlwêran) is a village in the Kâhta District, Adıyaman Province, Turkey. The village is populated by Kurds of the Bêzikan tribe and had a population of 450 in 2021.

The hamlet of Bahçe is attached to Belören.
