= İslamköy, Kahta =

Village in Adıyaman Province, Turkey

İslamköy
- Village
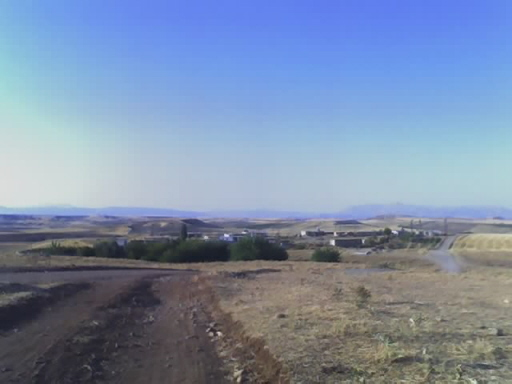

- Location within Turkey
- Coordinates: 37.699°N 38.550°E
- Country: Turkey
- Province: Adıyaman
- District: Kâhta
- Population (2021): 13
- Time zone: UTC+3 (TRT)

İslamköy (Kurdish: Şêxmîrik) is a village in the Kâhta District, Adıyaman Province, Turkey. The village is populated by Kurds of the Bêzikan tribe and had a population of 13 in 2021.
