= Burmapınar, Kahta =

Village in Adıyaman Province, Turkey

Burmapınar
- Village
- Location within Turkey
- Coordinates: 37.937°N 38.613°E
- Country: Turkey
- Province: Adıyaman
- District: Kâhta
- Population (2021): 493
- Time zone: UTC+3 (TRT)

Burmapınar (Kurdish: Darberî) is a village in the Kâhta District, Adıyaman Province, Turkey. The village is populated by Kurds of the Reşwan tribe and had a population of 493 in 2021.

The hamlets of Dikmen and Hisar are attached to the village.
