= Yapraklı, Kahta =

Village in Adıyaman Province, Turkey

Yapraklı
- Village
- Location within Turkey
- Coordinates: 37.8332°N 38.8254°E
- Country: Turkey
- Province: Adıyaman
- District: Kâhta
- Population (2021): 875
- Time zone: UTC+3 (TRT)

Yapraklı (Kurdish: Koruskil) is a village in the Kâhta District, Adıyaman Province, Turkey. The village is populated by Kurds of the Canbeg and Mirdêsan tribe and had a population of 875 in 2021.
