= Boztarla, Kahta =

Village in Adıyaman Province, Turkey

Boztarla
- Village
- Location within Turkey
- Coordinates: 37.671°N 38.653°E
- Country: Turkey
- Province: Adıyaman
- District: Kâhta
- Population (2021): 38
- Time zone: UTC+3 (TRT)

Boztarla (Kurdish: Mamecan) is a village in the Kâhta District of Adıyaman Province, Turkey. The village is inhabited by Kurds of the Kawan tribe and had a population of 38 in 2021.
