= Bölükyayla, Kahta =

Village in Adıyaman Province, Turkey

Bölükyayla
- Municipality
- Location in Turkey
- Coordinates: 37.879°N 38.479°E
- Country: Turkey
- Province: Adıyaman
- District: Kâhta
- Population (2021): 2,141
- Time zone: UTC+3 (TRT)

Bölükyayla (Kurdish: Mazêl) is a town (belde) and municipality in the Kâhta District, Adıyaman Province, Turkey. The town is populated by Kurds of the Îzol tribe and had a population of 2,141 in 2021.
