= Çatıksu, Aydıntepe =

Çatıksu
- Village
- Location within Turkey
- Coordinates: 40°24′N 40°04′E
- Country: Turkey
- Province: Bayburt
- District: Aydıntepe
- Population (2021): 316
- Time zone: UTC+3 (TRT)

Çatıksu is a village in the Aydıntepe District, Bayburt Province, Turkey. Its population is 316 (2021).

== History ==
The former name of the village was Vahşen.
