= Sarısu, Kahta =

Village in Adıyaman Province, Turkey

Sarısu
- Village
- Location within Turkey
- Coordinates: 37.708°N 38.501°E
- Country: Turkey
- Province: Adıyaman
- District: Kâhta
- Population (2021): 113
- Time zone: UTC+3 (TRT)

Sarısu is a village in the Kâhta District, Adıyaman Province, Turkey. The village is populated by Kurds of the Bezikan tribe and had a population of 113 in 2021.
