= Narlıdere, Kahta =

Village in Adıyaman Province, Turkey

Narlıdere
- Village
- Location within Turkey
- Coordinates: 37.857°N 38.737°E
- Country: Turkey
- Province: Adıyaman
- District: Kâhta
- Population (2021): 195
- Time zone: UTC+3 (TRT)

Narlıdere (Kurdish: Bidos) is a village in the Kâhta District, Adıyaman Province, Turkey. The village is populated by Kurds of the Mirdêsan tribe and had a population of 195 in 2021.
