= Elbeyi, Kâhta =

Village in Adıyaman Province, Turkey

Elbeyi
- Village
- Location within Turkey
- Coordinates: 37.754°N 38.771°E
- Country: Turkey
- Province: Adıyaman
- District: Kâhta
- Population (2021): 319
- Time zone: UTC+3 (TRT)

Elbeyi (formerly Fındıklıçalı, Kurdish: Êlbeg) is a village in the Kâhta District, Adıyaman Province, Turkey. The village is populated by Kurds of the Kawan tribe and had a population of 319 in 2021.
