= Salkımbağı, Kahta =

Village in Adıyaman Province, Turkey

Salkımbağı
- Village
- Location within Turkey
- Coordinates: 37.830°N 38.576°E
- Country: Turkey
- Province: Adıyaman
- District: Kâhta
- Population (2021): 1,478
- Time zone: UTC+3 (TRT)

Salkımbağı (Kurdish: Elût) is a village in the Kâhta District, Adıyaman Province, Turkey. The village is populated by Kurds of the Reşwan tribe and had a population of 1,478 in 2021.
