= Teknecik, Kâhta =

Village in Adıyaman Province, Turkey

Teknecik
- Village
- Location within Turkey
- Coordinates: 37.853°N 38.898°E
- Country: Turkey
- Province: Adıyaman
- District: Kâhta
- Population (2021): 88
- Time zone: UTC+3 (TRT)

Teknecik (Kurdish: Kûdan) is a village in the Kâhta District of Adıyaman Province in Turkey. The village is populated by Kurds of the Canbegan tribe and had a population of 88 in 2021.
