= Esendere, Kâhta =

Esendere
- Village
- Location within Turkey
- Coordinates: 37.8728°N 38.6454°E
- Country: Turkey
- Province: Adıyaman
- District: Kâhta
- Population (2021): 445
- Time zone: UTC+3 (TRT)

Esendere (formerly Akpınar, Kurdish: Kîlisik) is a village in the Kâhta District, Adıyaman Province, Turkey. The village is populated by Kurds of the Reşwan tribe and had a population of 445 in 2021.
