= Hacıyusuf, Kahta =

Village in Adıyaman Province, Turkey

Hacıyusuf
- Village
- Location within Turkey
- Coordinates: 37.667°N 38.571°E
- Country: Turkey
- Province: Adıyaman
- District: Kâhta
- Population (2021): 150
- Time zone: UTC+3 (TRT)

Hacıyusuf, formerly Sarıdana, (Kurdish: Bozmîş) is a village in the Kâhta District, Adıyaman Province, Turkey. The village is populated by Kurds of the Bêzikan tribe and had a population of 150 in 2021.

The hamlet of Kınık is attached to Hacıyusuf.
