= Koçtepe, Kahta =

Village in Adıyaman Province, Turkey

Koçtepe
- Village
- Location within Turkey
- Coordinates: 37.889°N 38.661°E
- Country: Turkey
- Province: Adıyaman
- District: Kâhta
- Population (2021): 484
- Time zone: UTC+3 (TRT)

Koçtepe (Kurdish: Hopak) is a village in the Kâhta District, Adıyaman Province, Turkey. The village is populated by Kurds of the Reşwan tribe and had a population of 484 in 2021.

The hamlets of Yamaçlı, Yaylacık and Yenice are attached to the village.
