= Akdoğan, Kahta =

Akdoğan
- Village
- Location within Turkey
- Coordinates: 37.8840°N 38.7053°E
- Country: Turkey
- Province: Adıyaman
- District: Kâhta
- Population (2021): 371
- Time zone: UTC+3 (TRT)

Akdoğan (Kurdish: Xiştûr) is a village in the Kâhta District, Adıyaman Province, Turkey. The village is populated by Kurds of the Mirdêsan tribe and had a population of 371 in 2021.

The hamlet of Çukur is attached to the village.
