= Akalın, Kahta =

Village in Adıyaman Province, Turkey

Akalın
- Village
- Location within Turkey
- Coordinates: 37.781°N 38.887°E
- Country: Turkey
- Province: Adıyaman
- District: Kâhta
- Population (2021): 100
- Time zone: UTC+3 (TRT)

Akalın (Kurdish: Karseleh) is a village in the Kâhta District, Adıyaman Province, Turkey. The village is populated by Kurds of the Gewozî tribe and had a population of 100 in 2021.
