= Günbuldu, Aydıntepe =

Günbuldu
- Village
- Location within Turkey
- Country: Turkey
- Province: Bayburt
- District: Aydıntepe
- Population (2021): 40
- Time zone: UTC+3 (TRT)

Günbuldu is a village in the Aydıntepe District, Bayburt Province, Turkey. Its population is 40 (2021).

== History ==
The former name of the village was Files.
