= Alaca, Aydıntepe =

Alaca
- Village
- Location within Turkey
- Coordinates: 40.4432°N 40.0015°E
- Country: Turkey
- Province: Bayburt
- District: Aydıntepe
- Population (2021): 35
- Time zone: UTC+3 (TRT)

Alaca is a village in the Aydıntepe District, Bayburt Province, Turkey. Its population is 35 (2021).
