= Bağbaşı, Kahta =

Village in Adıyaman Province, Turkey

Bağbaşı
- Village
- Location within Turkey
- Coordinates: 37.8994°N 38.7351°E
- Country: Turkey
- Province: Adıyaman
- District: Kâhta
- Population (2021): 1,191
- Time zone: UTC+3 (TRT)

Bağbaşı (Kurdish: Pilêş) is a village in the Kâhta District, Adıyaman Province, Turkey. The village is populated by Kurds of the Mirdêsan tribe and had a population of 1,191 in 2021.

The hamlet of İkizler is attached to Bağbaşı.
