= Gökçe, Kahta =

Village in Adıyaman Province, Turkey

Gökçe
- Village
- Location within Turkey
- Coordinates: 37.8347°N 38.7695°E
- Country: Turkey
- Province: Adıyaman
- District: Kâhta
- Population (2021): 212
- Time zone: UTC+3 (TRT)

Gökçe (Kurdish: Birçan) is a village in the Kâhta District, Adıyaman Province, Turkey. The village is populated by Kurds of the Mirdêsan tribe and had a population of 212 in 2021.

The hamlet of Avnik is attached to the village.
