= Bostanlı, Kahta =

Village in Adıyaman Province, Turkey

Bostanlı
- Village
- Location within Turkey
- Coordinates: 37.8150°N 38.8937°E
- Country: Turkey
- Province: Adıyaman
- District: Kâhta
- Population (2021): 637
- Time zone: UTC+3 (TRT)

Bostanlı (Kurdish: Kêtiş) is a village in the Kâhta District, Adıyaman Province, Turkey. The village is populated by Kurds of the Canbeg tribe and had a population of 637 in 2021.

The hamlets of Altınbaş and Yazıcı are attached to the village.
