= Dikenli, Kahta =

Village in Adıyaman Province, Turkey

Dikenli
- Village
- Location within Turkey
- Coordinates: 37.655°N 38.837°E
- Country: Turkey
- Province: Adıyaman
- District: Kâhta
- Population (2021): 122
- Time zone: UTC+3 (TRT)

Dikenli (Kurdish: Gurnî) is a village in the Kâhta District, Adıyaman Province, Turkey. The village is populated by Kurds of the Kawan tribe and had a population of 122 in 2021.
