= Ziyaret, Kahta =

Village in Adıyaman Province, Turkey

Ziyaret
- Village
- Location within Turkey
- Coordinates: 37.742°N 38.593°E
- Country: Turkey
- Province: Adıyaman
- District: Kâhta
- Population (2021): 146
- Time zone: UTC+3 (TRT)

Ziyaret (Kurdish: Pûşî) is a village in the Kâhta District, Adıyaman Province, Turkey. The village is populated by Kurds of the Bêzikan tribe and had a population of 146 in 2021.
