= Cumhuriyet, Kahta =

Village in Adıyaman Province, Turkey

Cumhuriyet
- Village
- Location within Turkey
- Coordinates: 37.803°N 38.740°E
- Country: Turkey
- Province: Adıyaman
- District: Kâhta
- Population (2021): 865
- Time zone: UTC+3 (TRT)

Cumhuriyet (Kurdish: Lilan) is a village in the Kâhta District, Adıyaman Province, Turkey. The village is populated by Kurds of the Mirdêsî tribe and had a population of 865 in 2021.
