= Sırakaya, Kahta =

Village in Adıyaman Province, Turkey

Sırakaya
- Village
- Location within Turkey
- Coordinates: 37.922°N 38.688°E
- Country: Turkey
- Province: Adıyaman
- District: Kâhta
- Population (2021): 129
- Time zone: UTC+3 (TRT)

Sırakaya (Kurdish: Kakşêr) is a village in the Kâhta District, Adıyaman Province, Turkey. The village is populated by Kurds of the Kawan tribe and had a population of 129 in 2021.
