= Kozağaç, Kahta =

Kozağaç
- Village
- Location within Turkey
- Coordinates: 37.908°N 38.550°E
- Country: Turkey
- Province: Adıyaman
- District: Kâhta
- Population (2021): 280
- Time zone: UTC+3 (TRT)

Kozağaç (Kurdish: Bîwa) is a village in the Kâhta District, Adıyaman Province, Turkey. The village is populated by Kurds of the Îzol tribe and had a population of 280 in 2021.

The hamlet of Çetinkaya is attached to the village.
