= Ortanca, Kahta =

Village in Adıyaman Province, Turkey

Ortanca
- Village
- Location within Turkey
- Coordinates: 37.770°N 38.581°E
- Country: Turkey
- Province: Adıyaman
- District: Kâhta
- Population (2021): 362
- Time zone: UTC+3 (TRT)

Ortanca (Kurdish: Sûsan) is a village in the Kâhta District, Adıyaman Province, Turkey. The village is populated by Kurds of the Reşwan tribe and had a population of 362 in 2021.

The hamlets of Dalpınar and Kubilay are attached to the village.
