= Aydıntepe =

- Municipality
- Location in Turkey
- Coordinates: 40°23′27″N 40°09′02″E
- Country: Turkey
- Province: Bayburt
- District: Aydıntepe

Government
  - Mayor: Haşim Şentürk (MHP)
- Elevation: 1,650 m (5,410 ft)
- Population (2021): 3,239
- Time zone: UTC+3 (TRT)
- Postal code: 69500
- Website: www.aydintepe.bel.tr

Aydıntepe is a small town in Bayburt Province in the Black Sea region of Turkey. It is the seat of Aydıntepe District. Its population is 3,239 (2021). The mayor is Haşim Şentürk (MHP).

The ancient Aydıntepe underground city, situated beneath the town, and stretching over 1 km (0.62 mi), is a visitor attraction.
