= Kılıçkaya, Aydıntepe =

Kılıçkaya
- Village
- Location within Turkey
- Coordinates: 40.4884°N 40.2559°E
- Country: Turkey
- Province: Bayburt
- District: Aydıntepe
- Population (2021): 55
- Time zone: UTC+3 (TRT)

Kılıçkaya is a village in the Aydıntepe District, Bayburt Province, Turkey. Its population is 55 (2021).

== History ==
The former name of the village was Yukarı Çençül.
