= Kavlatan, Aydıntepe =

Kavlatan
- Village
- Location within Turkey
- Coordinates: 40°33′N 40°11′E
- Country: Turkey
- Province: Bayburt
- District: Aydıntepe
- Population (2021): 105
- Time zone: UTC+3 (TRT)

Kavlatan is a village in the Aydıntepe District, Bayburt Province, Turkey. Its population is 105 (2021).
