= Göçeri, Kahta =

Village in Adıyaman Province, Turkey

Göçeri
- Village
- Location within Turkey
- Coordinates: 37.783°N 38.747°E
- Country: Turkey
- Province: Adıyaman
- District: Kâhta
- Population (2021): 494
- Time zone: UTC+3 (TRT)

Göçeri (Kurdish: Goçerî) is a village in the Kâhta District, Adıyaman Province, Turkey. The village is populated by Kurds of the Gewozî tribe and had a population of 487 in 2021.

The hamlet of Buhara is attached to Göçeri.
