= Çayırköprü, Aydıntepe =

Çayırköprü
- Village
- Location within Turkey
- Coordinates: 40°21′N 40°13′E
- Country: Turkey
- Province: Bayburt
- District: Aydıntepe
- Population (2021): 96
- Time zone: UTC+3 (TRT)

Çayırköprü is a village in the Aydıntepe District, Bayburt Province, Turkey. Its population is 96 (2021).

== History ==
The former name of the village was Vağında.
