= Çaybaşı, Kahta =

Village in Adıyaman Province, Turkey

Çaybaşı
- Village
- Location within Turkey
- Coordinates: 37.677°N 38.525°E
- Country: Turkey
- Province: Adıyaman
- District: Kâhta
- Population (2021): 388
- Time zone: UTC+3 (TRT)

Çaybaşı (Kurdish: Bazuk) is a village in the Kâhta District, Adıyaman Province, Turkey. The village is populated by Kurds of the Bezikan tribe and had a population of 388 in 2021.

The hamlets of Akbal, Bulutlu, Duman and Kamışlı are attached to the village.
