= Yanoba, Aydıntepe =

Yanoba
- Village
- Location within Turkey
- Coordinates: 40.4183°N 40.1874°E
- Country: Turkey
- Province: Bayburt
- District: Aydıntepe
- Population (2021): 43
- Time zone: UTC+3 (TRT)

Yanoba is a village in the Aydıntepe District, Bayburt Province, Turkey. Its population is 43 (2021).

== History ==
The former name of the village was Aşuri.
