= Adalı, Kahta =

Village in Adıyaman Province, Turkey

Adalı
- Village
- Location within Turkey
- Coordinates: 37.7874°N 38.9264°E
- Country: Turkey
- Province: Adıyaman
- District: Kâhta
- Population (2021): 221
- Time zone: UTC+3 (TRT)

Adalı (Kurdish: Garmîrik) is a village in the Kâhta District, Adıyaman Province, Turkey. The village is populated by Kurds of the Gewozî tribe and had a population of 221 in 2021.
