= Ekinci, Kahta =

Village in Adıyaman Province, Turkey

Ekinci
- Village
- Location within Turkey
- Coordinates: 37.8467°N 38.8156°E
- Country: Turkey
- Province: Adıyaman
- District: Kâhta
- Population (2021): 158
- Time zone: UTC+3 (TRT)

Ekinci (Kurdish: Tiznût) is a village in the Kâhta District, Adıyaman Province, Turkey. The village is populated by Kurds of the Mirdêsan tribe and had a population of 158 in 2021.

The hamlet of Üçkardeş is attached to Ekinci.
