= Tuğlu, Kahta =

Village in Adıyaman Province, Turkey

Tuğlu
- Village
- Location within Turkey
- Coordinates: 37.774°N 38.790°E
- Country: Turkey
- Province: Adıyaman
- District: Kâhta
- Population (2021): 487
- Time zone: UTC+3 (TRT)

Tuğlu (Kurdish: Sêvik) is a village in the Kâhta District, Adıyaman Province, Turkey. The village is populated by Kurds of the Gewozî tribe and had a population of 487 in 2021.

The hamlets of Elmalı, Karmitli, Yenikoy, Yeşildirek and Yonca are attached to Tuğlu.
