= Oluklu, Kahta =

Village in Adıyaman Province, Turkey

Oluklu
- Village
- Location within Turkey
- Coordinates: 37.747°N 38.704°E
- Country: Turkey
- Province: Adıyaman
- District: Kâhta
- Population (2021): 754
- Time zone: UTC+3 (TRT)

Oluklu (Kurdish: Qercor) is a village in the Kâhta District, Adıyaman Province, Turkey. The village is populated by Kurds of the Kawan tribe and had a population of 754 in 2021.

The hamlets of Akçakent, Çakırlı, Doğantepe, Gözelek, Köprü, Köseler and Yeşilyurt are attached to Oluklu.
