= Teğmenli, Kahta =

Village in Adıyaman Province, Turkey

Teğmenli
- Village
- Location within Turkey
- Coordinates: 37.897°N 38.610°E
- Country: Turkey
- Province: Adıyaman
- District: Kâhta
- Population (2021): 497
- Time zone: UTC+3 (TRT)

Teğmenli (Kurdish: Kergurak) is a village in the Kâhta District, Adıyaman Province, Turkey. The village is populated by Kurds of the Reşwan tribe and had a population of 497 in 2021.

The hamlet of Keklik is attached to the village.
