= Aydınpınar, Kahta =

Aydınpınar
- Village
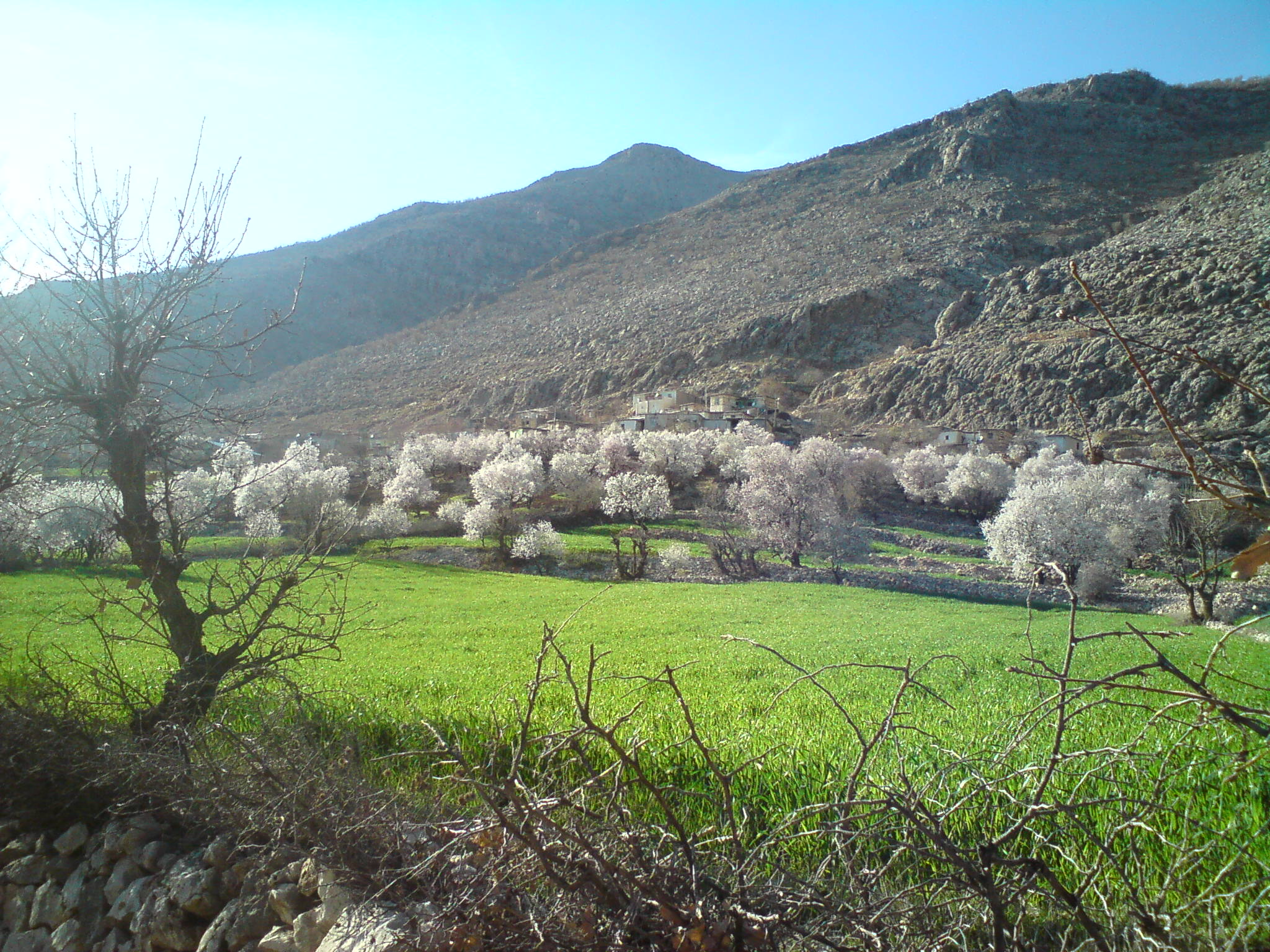

- Location within Turkey
- Coordinates: 37.904°N 38.768°E
- Country: Turkey
- Province: Adıyaman
- District: Kâhta
- Population (2021): 287
- Time zone: UTC+3 (TRT)

Aydınpınar (Kurdish: Şûm) is a village in the Kâhta District, Adıyaman Province, Turkey. The village is populated by Kurds of the Mirdêsan tribe and had a population of 287 in 2021.
