= Köseler, Kahta =

Village in Adıyaman Province, Turkey

Köseler
- Village
- Location within Turkey
- Coordinates: 37.699°N 38.623°E
- Country: Turkey
- Province: Adıyaman
- District: Kâhta
- Population (2021): 736
- Time zone: UTC+3 (TRT)

Köseler (Kurdish: Kosler) is a village in the Kâhta District, Adıyaman Province, Turkey. The village is populated by Kurds of the Bêzikan tribe and had a population of 736 in 2021.

The hamlets of Sultanmağara and Yeşiltepe are attached to the village.
