= Hasköy, Kahta =

Village in Adıyaman Province, Turkey

Hasköy
- Village
- Location within Turkey
- Coordinates: 37.668°N 38.790°E
- Country: Turkey
- Province: Adıyaman
- District: Kâhta
- Population (2021): 90
- Time zone: UTC+3 (TRT)

Hasköy (formerly Yığınak, Kurdish: Xurês) is a village in the Kâhta District, Adıyaman Province, Turkey. The village is populated by Kurds of the Gewozî and Reşwan tribes and had a population of 90 in 2021.
