= Akbulut, Aydıntepe =

Akbulut
- Village
- Location within Turkey
- Coordinates: 40.4039°N 40.2427°E
- Country: Turkey
- Province: Bayburt
- District: Aydıntepe
- Population (2021): 160
- Time zone: UTC+3 (TRT)

Akbulut is a village in the Aydıntepe District, Bayburt Province, Turkey. Its population is 160 (2021).

== History ==
The former name of the village was Abrans.
