= Çamlıca, Kahta =

Village in Adıyaman Province, Turkey

Çamlıca
- Village
- Location within Turkey
- Coordinates: 37.717°N 38.745°E
- Country: Turkey
- Province: Adıyaman
- District: Kâhta
- Population (2021): 113
- Time zone: UTC+3 (TRT)

Çamlıca (Kurdish: Çamçîn) is a village in the Kâhta District of Adıyaman Province in Turkey. The village is populated by Kurds of the Kawan tribe and had a population of 113 in 2021.
