= Yenice, Kahta =

Village in Adıyaman Province, Turkey

Yenice
- Village
- Location within Turkey
- Coordinates: 37.796°N 38.814°E
- Country: Turkey
- Province: Adıyaman
- District: Kâhta
- Population (2021): 62
- Time zone: UTC+3 (TRT)

Yenice (Kurdish: Înciklîyê) is a village in the Kâhta District, Adıyaman Province, Turkey. The village is populated by Kurds of the Gewozî tribe and had a population of 62 in 2021.
