= Kayadibi, Kahta =

Village in Adıyaman Province, Turkey

Kayadibi
- Village
- Location within Turkey
- Coordinates: 37.943°N 38.701°E
- Country: Turkey
- Province: Adıyaman
- District: Kâhta
- Population (2021): 160
- Time zone: UTC+3 (TRT)

Kayadibi (Kurdish: Horik) is a village in the Kâhta District, Adıyaman Province, Turkey. The village is populated by Kurds of the Îzol tribe and had a population of 160 in 2021.

The hamlet of Beşocak is attached to the village.
