= Aşağıkırzı, Aydıntepe =

Aşağıkırzı
- Village
- Location within Turkey
- Coordinates: 40°21′N 40°10′E
- Country: Turkey
- Province: Bayburt
- District: Aydıntepe
- Population (2021): 354
- Time zone: UTC+3 (TRT)

Aşağıkırzı is a village in the Aydıntepe District, Bayburt Province, Turkey. Its population is 354 (2021).
