= Karataş, Kahta =

Village in Adıyaman Province, Turkey

Karataş
- Village
- Location within Turkey
- Coordinates: 37.656°N 38.820°E
- Country: Turkey
- Province: Adıyaman
- District: Kâhta
- Population (2021): 68
- Time zone: UTC+3 (TRT)

Karataş is a village in the Kâhta District, Adıyaman Province, Turkey. The village is populated by Kurds of the Kawan tribe and had a population of 68 in 2021.
