= Ballı, Kahta =

Village in Adıyaman Province, Turkey

Ballı
- Village
- Location within Turkey
- Coordinates: 37.8779°N 38.8917°E
- Country: Turkey
- Province: Adıyaman
- District: Kâhta
- Population (2021): 259
- Time zone: UTC+3 (TRT)

Ballı (Kurdish: Hût) is a village in the Kâhta District, Adıyaman Province, Turkey. The village is populated by Kurds of the Canbeg tribe and had a population of 259 in 2021.
