= Aydıntepe District =

District of Bayburt Province, Turkey

- District
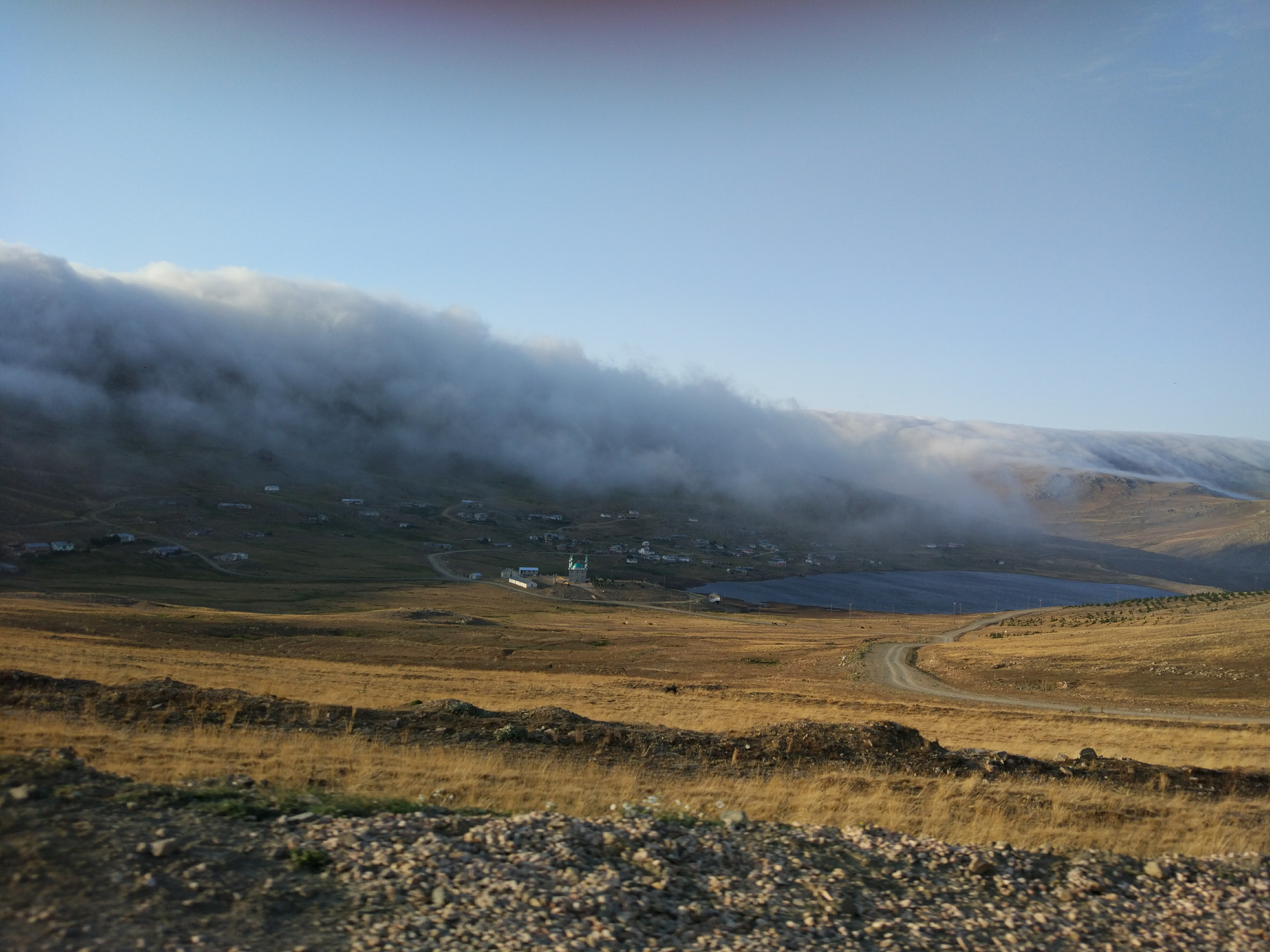
- yayla of Aydıntepe, Bayburt

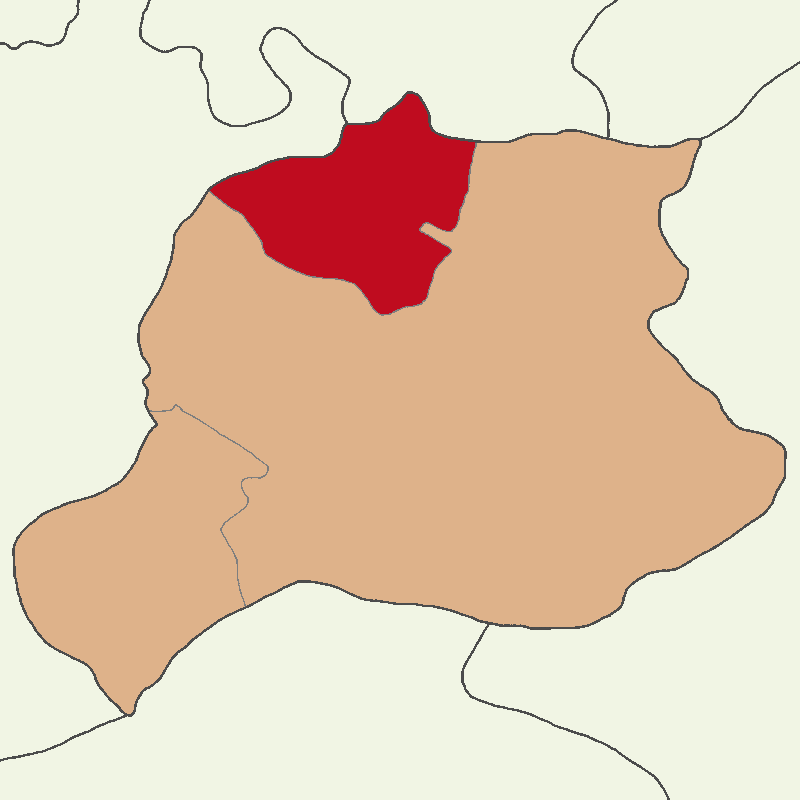
- Map showing Aydıntepe District in Bayburt Province

- Location within Turkey
- Coordinates: 40°23′N 40°09′E
- Country: Turkey
- Province: Bayburt
- Seat: Aydıntepe

Government
  - Kaymakam: Kerem Yenigün
- Area: 446 km^{2} (172 sq mi)
- Population (2021): 6,234
  - Density: 14.0/km^{2} (36.2/sq mi)
- Time zone: UTC+3 (TRT)
- Website: www.aydintepe.gov.tr

Aydıntepe District is a district of Bayburt Province of Turkey. Its seat is the town Aydıntepe. Its area is 446 km^{2}, and its population is 6,234 (2021).

== Composition ==
There is one municipality in Aydıntepe District:

- Aydıntepe

There are 23 villages in Aydıntepe District:

- Akbulut
- Alaca
- Aşağıkırzı
- Başpınar
- Çatıksu
- Çayırköprü
- Çiğdemlik
- Dumlu
- Erikdibi
- Gümüşdamla
- Günbuldu
- İncili
- Kavlatan
- Kılıçkaya
- Pınargözü
- Şalcılar
- Sırataşlar
- Sorkunlu
- Suludere
- Yanoba
- Yapracık
- Yazlık
- Yukarıkırzı
