= Sıraca, Kahta =

Village in Adıyaman Province, Turkey

Sıraca
- Village
- Location in Turkey
- Coordinates: 37.840°N 38.757°E
- Country: Turkey
- Province: Adıyaman
- District: Kâhta
- Population (2021): 434
- Time zone: UTC+3 (TRT)

Sıraca is a village in the Kâhta District, Adıyaman Province, Turkey. The village is populated by Kurds of the Mirdêsî and had a population of 434 in 2021.

The hamlet of Baltalı is attached to Sıraca.
