= Erikli, Kahta =

Erikli
- Village
- Location within Turkey
- Coordinates: 37.867°N 38.804°E
- Country: Turkey
- Province: Adıyaman
- District: Kâhta
- Population (2021): 1,688
- Time zone: UTC+3 (TRT)

Erikli (Kurdish: Berbût) is a village in the Kâhta District, Adıyaman Province, Turkey. The village is populated by Kurds of the Mirdêsan tribe and had a population of 1,688 in 2021.

The hamlets of Divan, İnceyol, Kapılı and Yenişehir are attached to the village.
