= Çıralık, Kahta =

Village in Adıyaman Province, Turkey

Çıralık
- Village
- Location within Turkey
- Coordinates: 37.804°N 38.541°E
- Country: Turkey
- Province: Adıyaman
- District: Kâhta
- Population (2021): 591
- Time zone: UTC+3 (TRT)

Çıralık (Kurdish: Çiralix) is a village in the Kâhta District, Adıyaman Province, Turkey. The village is populated by Kurds of the Reşwan tribe and had a population of 591 in 2021.

The hamlets of Bulgurlu, Çelebi and Gözceli are attached to Çıralık.
