= Tütenocak, Kahta =

Village in Adıyaman Province, Turkey

Tütenocak
- Village
- Location within Turkey
- Coordinates: 37.883°N 38.687°E
- Country: Turkey
- Province: Adıyaman
- District: Kâhta
- Population (2021): 340
- Time zone: UTC+3 (TRT)

Tütenocak (Kurdish: Bersomik) is a village in the Kâhta District, Adıyaman Province, Turkey. The village is populated by Kurds of the Reşwan tribe and had a population of 340 in 2021.

The hamlets of Dikmetaş and Tosun are attached to the village.
