= Yazlık, Aydıntepe =

Yazlık
- Village
- Location within Turkey
- Coordinates: 40.4365°N 40.0719°E
- Country: Turkey
- Province: Bayburt
- District: Aydıntepe
- Population (2021): 25
- Time zone: UTC+3 (TRT)

Yazlık is a village in the Aydıntepe District, Bayburt Province, Turkey. Its population is 25 (2021).

== History ==
The former name of the village was Diğerdanzut.
