= Yapracık, Aydıntepe =

Yapracık
- Village
- Location within Turkey
- Coordinates: 40.4177°N 40.2099°E
- Country: Turkey
- Province: Bayburt
- District: Aydıntepe
- Population (2021): 16
- Time zone: UTC+3 (TRT)

Yapracık is a village in the Aydıntepe District, Bayburt Province, Turkey. Its population is 16 (2021).

== History ==
The former name of the village was Sindeli.
