= Boğazkaya, Kahta =

Boğazkaya
- Village
- Location within Turkey
- Coordinates: 37.893°N 38.509°E
- Country: Turkey
- Province: Adıyaman
- District: Kâhta
- Population (2021): 417
- Time zone: UTC+3 (TRT)

Boğazkaya (Kurdish: Xemşik) is a village in the Kâhta District, Adıyaman Province, Turkey. The village is populated by Kurds of the Îzol tribe and had a population of 417 in 2021.
