= Akkuş, Kahta =

Village in Adıyaman Province, Turkey

Akkuş
- Village
- Location within Turkey
- Coordinates: 37.870°N 38.710°E
- Country: Turkey
- Province: Adıyaman
- District: Kâhta
- Population (2021): 230
- Time zone: UTC+3 (TRT)

Akkuş (Kurdish: Harebe) is a village in the Kâhta District of Adıyaman Province in Turkey. The village is populated by Kurds of the Reşwan tribe and had a population of 230 in 2021.
