= Bozpınar, Kahta =

Village in Adıyaman Province, Turkey

Bozpınar
- Village
- Location within Turkey
- Coordinates: 37.8628°N 38.8453°E
- Country: Turkey
- Province: Adıyaman
- District: Kâhta
- Population (2021): 418
- Time zone: UTC+3 (TRT)

Bozpınar (Kurdish: Arge) is a village in the Kâhta District, Adıyaman Province, Turkey. The village is populated by Kurds of the Mirdêsan tribe and had a population of 418 in 2021.

The hamlet of Yolboyu is attached to the village.
