= Yelkovan, Kahta =

Village in Adıyaman Province, Turkey

Yelkovan
- Village
- Location within Turkey
- Coordinates: 37.835°N 38.543°E
- Country: Turkey
- Province: Adıyaman
- District: Kâhta
- Population (2021): 646
- Time zone: UTC+3 (TRT)

Yelkovan (Kurdish: Hemzeyn) is a village in the Kâhta District, Adıyaman Province, Turkey. The village is populated by Kurds of the Reşwan tribe and had a population of 646 in 2021.
