= Gölgeli, Kahta =

Village in Adıyaman Province, Turkey

Gölgeli
- Village
- Location within Turkey
- Coordinates: 37.863°N 38.660°E
- Country: Turkey
- Province: Adıyaman
- District: Kâhta
- Population (2021): 393
- Time zone: UTC+3 (TRT)

Gölgeli (Kurdish: Bervedol) is a village in the Kâhta District, Adıyaman Province, Turkey. The village is populated by Kurds of the Reşwan tribe and had a population of 393 in 2021.

The hamlets of Atlı, Bulut and Sırakaya are attached to the village.
