= Yeşilkaya, Kahta =

Village in Adıyaman Province, Turkey

Yeşilkaya
- Village
- Location within Turkey
- Coordinates: 37.712°N 38.722°E
- Country: Turkey
- Province: Adıyaman
- District: Kâhta
- Population (2021): 43
- Time zone: UTC+3 (TRT)

Yeşilkaya (Kurdish: Behîk) is a village in the Kâhta District of Adıyaman Province, Turkey. The village is populated by Kurds of the Kawan tribe and had a population of 43 in 2021.
