= İncili, Aydıntepe =

İncili
- Village
- Location within Turkey
- Coordinates: 40.3916°N 40.2025°E
- Country: Turkey
- Province: Bayburt
- District: Aydıntepe
- Population (2021): 168
- Time zone: UTC+3 (TRT)

İncili is a village in the Aydıntepe District, Bayburt Province, Turkey. Its population is 168 (2021).

== History ==
The former name of the village was Ardusta.
