= Güzelçay, Kahta =

Village in Adıyaman Province, Turkey

Güzelçay
- Village
- Location within Turkey
- Coordinates: 37.6974°N 38.6755°E
- Country: Turkey
- Province: Adıyaman
- District: Kâhta
- Population (2021): 157
- Time zone: UTC+3 (TRT)

Güzelçay (Kurdish: Qilawûn) is a village in the Kâhta District, Adıyaman Province, Turkey. The village is populated by Kurds of the Kawan tribe and had a population of 157 in 2021.

The hamlets of Boztarla and Güvercinler are attached to the village.
