= Bağözü, Kahta =

Village in Adıyaman Province, Turkey

Bağözü
- Village
- Location within Turkey
- Coordinates: 37.852°N 38.592°E
- Country: Turkey
- Province: Adıyaman
- District: Kâhta
- Population (2021): 98
- Time zone: UTC+3 (TRT)

Bağözü (Kurdish: Berazî) is a village in the Kâhta District of Adıyaman Province in Turkey. The village is populated by Kurds of the Reşwan tribe and had a population of 98 in 2021.
