= Sırataşlar, Aydıntepe =

Sırataşlar
- Village
- Location within Turkey
- Coordinates: 40.4710°N 40.2650°E
- Country: Turkey
- Province: Bayburt
- District: Aydıntepe
- Population (2021): 76
- Time zone: UTC+3 (TRT)

Sırataşlar is a village in the Aydıntepe District, Bayburt Province, Turkey. Its population is 76 (2021).

== History ==
The former name of the village was Aşağı Çençül.
