= Ulupınar, Kahta =

Village in Adıyaman Province, Turkey

Ulupınar
- Village
- Location within Turkey
- Coordinates: 37.722°N 38.783°E
- Country: Turkey
- Province: Adıyaman
- District: Kâhta
- Population (2021): 345
- Time zone: UTC+3 (TRT)

Ulupınar (Kurdish: Bîwa) is a village in the Kâhta District, Adıyaman Province, Turkey. The village is populated by Kurds of the Gewozî and Kawan tribes and had a population of 345 in 2021.

The hamlets of Ataköy, Bakacak, Kılavuz and Mustafaçayır are attached to the village.
