= Alidam, Kâhta =

Village in Adıyaman Province, Turkey

Alidam
- Village
- Location within Turkey
- Coordinates: 37°55′N 38°54′E
- Country: Turkey
- Province: Adıyaman
- District: Kâhta
- Population (2021): 847
- Time zone: UTC+3 (TRT)

Alidam (Kurdish: Ultam) is a village in the Kâhta District, Adıyaman Province, Turkey. The village is populated by Kurds of the Mirdêsan tribe and had a population of 847 in 2021.

The hamlet of Gedik is attached to the village.
