= Karaman, Kahta =

Village in Adıyaman Province, Turkey

Karaman
- Village
- Location within Turkey
- Coordinates: 37.828°N 38.895°E
- Country: Turkey
- Province: Adıyaman
- District: Kâhta
- Population (2021): 176
- Time zone: UTC+3 (TRT)

Karaman is a village in the Kâhta District, Adıyaman Province, Turkey. The village is populated by Kurds of the Canbegan tribe and had a population of 176 in 2021.
