= Karacaören, Kahta =

Village in Adıyaman Province, Turkey

Karacaören
- Village
- Location within Turkey
- Coordinates: 37.703°N 38.646°E
- Country: Turkey
- Province: Adıyaman
- District: Kâhta
- Population (2021): 279
- Time zone: UTC+3 (TRT)

Karacaören (Kurdish: Qircewêran) is a village in the Kâhta District, Adıyaman Province, Turkey. The village is populated by Kurds of the Kawan tribe and had a population of 279 in 2021.
