= İkizce, Kahta =

Village in Adıyaman Province, Turkey

İkizce
- Village
- Location within Turkey
- Coordinates: 37.794°N 38.840°E
- Country: Turkey
- Province: Adıyaman
- District: Kâhta
- Population (2021): 620
- Time zone: UTC+3 (TRT)

İkizce (Kurdish: Tûmik) is a village in the Kâhta District, Adıyaman Province, Turkey. The village is populated by Kurds of the Gewozî tribe and had a population of 620 in 2021.

The hamlets of Akçaören (Akçaveran), Bağiçi, Pınaryolu and Yazlık are attached to the village.
