= Gümüşdamla, Aydıntepe =

Gümüşdamla
- Village
- Location within Turkey
- Coordinates: 40.4199°N 40.1747°E
- Country: Turkey
- Province: Bayburt
- District: Aydıntepe
- Population (2021): 179
- Time zone: UTC+3 (TRT)

Gümüşdamla is a village in the Aydıntepe District, Bayburt Province, Turkey. Its population is 179 (2021).

== History ==
The former name of the village was Zargidi.
