= Narsırtı, Kahta =

Village in Adıyaman Province, Turkey

Narsırtı
- Village
- Location within Turkey
- Coordinates: 37.709°N 38.591°E
- Country: Turkey
- Province: Adıyaman
- District: Kâhta
- Population (2021): 102
- Time zone: UTC+3 (TRT)

Narsırtı (Kurdish: Karkûn) is a village in the Kâhta District, Adıyaman Province, Turkey. The village is populated by Kurds of the Bêzikan tribe and had a population of 102 in 2021.

The hamlet of Toprak is attached to Narsırtı.
