= Taşlıca, Kahta =

Village in Adıyaman Province, Turkey

Taşlıca
- Village
- Location within Turkey
- Coordinates: 37.883°N 38.576°E
- Country: Turkey
- Province: Adıyaman
- District: Kâhta
- Population (2021): 313
- Time zone: UTC+3 (TRT)

Taşlıca (Kurdish: Şamik) is a village in the Kâhta District, Adıyaman Province, Turkey. The village is populated by Kurds of the Îzol tribe and had a population of 313 in 2021.

The hamlet of Karabağ is attached to Taşlıca.
