= Fıstıklı, Kahta =

Village in Adıyaman Province, Turkey

Fıstıklı
- Village
- Location within Turkey
- Coordinates: 37.666°N 38.697°E
- Country: Turkey
- Province: Adıyaman
- District: Kâhta
- Population (2021): 138
- Time zone: UTC+3 (TRT)

Fıstıklı (Kurdish: Utan) is a village in the Kâhta District, Adıyaman Province, Turkey. The village is populated by Kurds of the Kawan tribe and had a population of 138 in 2021.
