= Çataltepe, Kahta =

Village in Adıyaman Province, Turkey

Çataltepe
- Village
- Location within Turkey
- Coordinates: 37.729°N 38.593°E
- Country: Turkey
- Province: Adıyaman
- District: Kâhta
- Population (2021): 295
- Time zone: UTC+3 (TRT)

Çataltepe (Kurdish: Daregir) is a village in the Kâhta District, Adıyaman Province, Turkey. The village is populated by Kurds of the Bêzikan and Reşwan tribes and had a population of 295 in 2021.

The hamlet of Bardaçık is attached to Çataltepe.
