= Şenköy, Kahta =

Village in Adıyaman Province, Turkey

Şenköy
- Village
- Location within Turkey
- Coordinates: 37.671°N 38.636°E
- Country: Turkey
- Province: Adıyaman
- District: Kâhta
- Population (2021): 59
- Time zone: UTC+3 (TRT)

Şenköy (Kurdish: Koşin) is a village in the Kâhta District, Adıyaman Province, Turkey. The village is populated by Kurds of the Bezikan tribe and had a population of 59 in 2021.
