= Karadut, Kahta =

Karadut
- Village
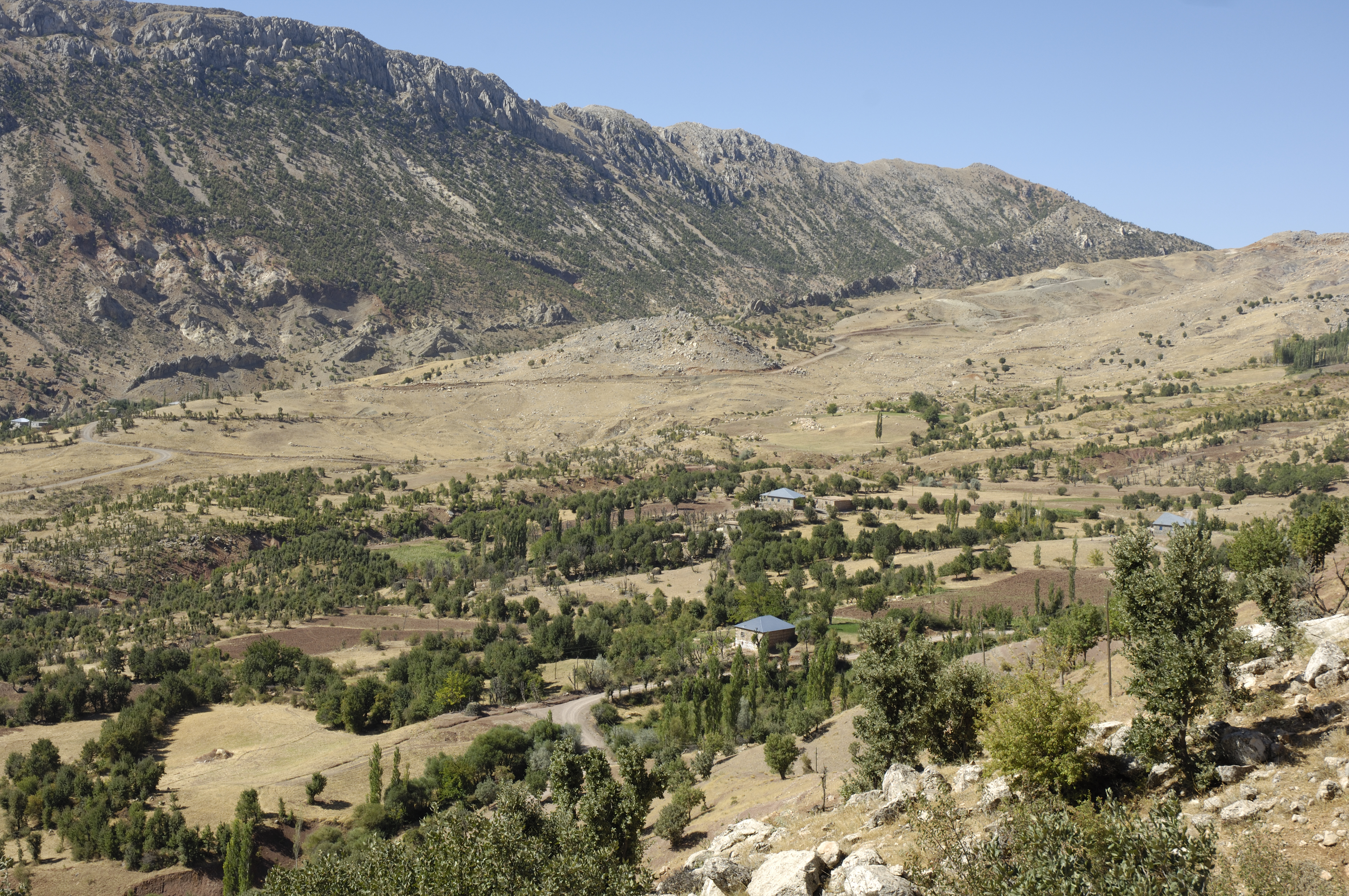

- Location within Turkey
- Coordinates: 37.928°N 38.789°E
- Country: Turkey
- Province: Adıyaman
- District: Kâhta
- Population (2021): 781
- Time zone: UTC+3 (TRT)

Karadut (Kurdish: Qertût) is a village in the Kâhta District, Adıyaman Province, Turkey. The village is populated by Kurds of the Mirdêsan tribe and had a population of 781 in 2021.

The hamlets of Derince, Onevler, Sarısu, Şahintepe and Şirinevler are attached to the village.
