= Başpınar, Aydıntepe =

Başpınar
- Village
- Location within Turkey
- Coordinates: 40.4417°N 40.0444°E
- Country: Turkey
- Province: Bayburt
- District: Aydıntepe
- Population (2021): 50
- Time zone: UTC+3 (TRT)

Başpınar is a village in the Aydıntepe District, Bayburt Province, Turkey. Its population is 50 (2021).

== History ==
The former name of the village was Diğerarmutlu.
