= Kavaklı, Kahta =

Village in Adıyaman Province, Turkey

Kavaklı
- Village
- Location within Turkey
- Coordinates: 37.8925°N 38.8353°E
- Country: Turkey
- Province: Adıyaman
- District: Kâhta
- Population (2021): 329
- Time zone: UTC+3 (TRT)

Kavaklı (Kurdish: Pîraq) is a village in the Kâhta District, Adıyaman Province, Turkey. The village is populated by Kurds of the Mirdêsan tribe and had a population of 329 in 2021.

The hamlets of Akpınar and Yolkesen are attached to the village.
