= Damlacık, Kahta =

Village in Adıyaman Province, Turkey

Damlacık
- Village
- Location within Turkey
- Coordinates: 37.9142°N 38.6539°E
- Country: Turkey
- Province: Adıyaman
- District: Kâhta
- Population (2021): 500
- Time zone: UTC+3 (TRT)

Damlacık (Kurdish: Tawsîyê) is a village in the Kâhta District, Adıyaman Province, Turkey. The village is populated by Kurds of the Reşwan tribe and had a population of 500 in 2021.

The hamlets of Işıktepe (Aşağı Çingil) and Karanfil are attached to Damlacık.
