= Zeytin, Kâhta =

Village in Adıyaman Province, Turkey

Zeytin
- Village
- Location within Turkey
- Coordinates: 37.771°N 38.540°E
- Country: Turkey
- Province: Adıyaman
- District: Kâhta
- Population (2021): 130
- Time zone: UTC+3 (TRT)

Zeytin (Kurdish: Zeydan) is a village in the Kâhta District, Adıyaman Province, Turkey. The village is populated by Kurds of the Reşwan tribe and had a population of 130 in 2021.

The hamlets of Ata and Kaya are attached to the village.
