= Sorkunlu, Aydıntepe =

Sorkunlu
- Village
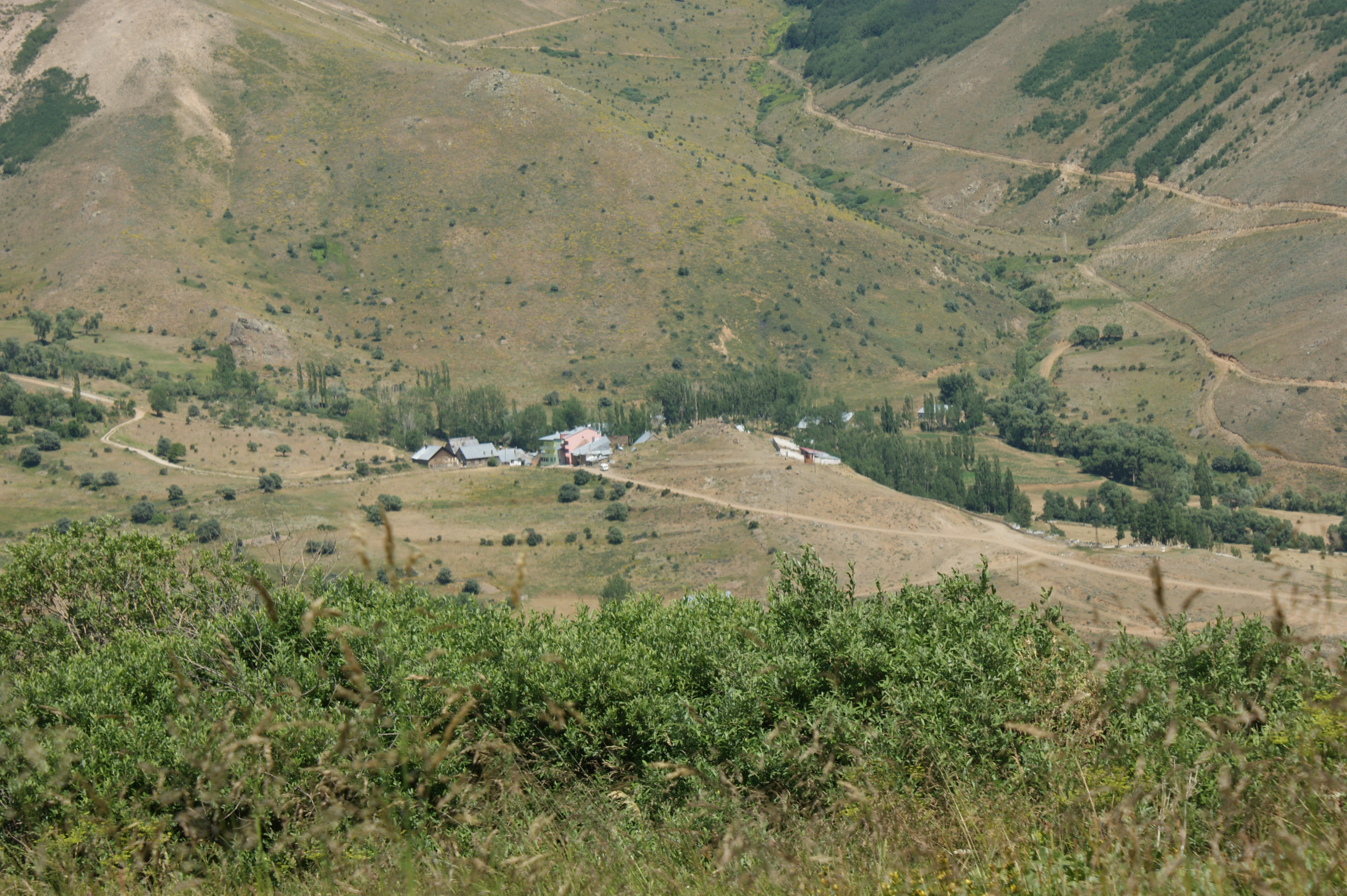

- Location within Turkey
- Country: Turkey
- Province: Bayburt
- District: Aydıntepe
- Population (2021): 36
- Time zone: UTC+3 (TRT)

Sorkunlu is a village in the Aydıntepe District, Bayburt Province, Turkey. Its population is 36 (2021).

== History ==
The former name of the village was Toransos.
