= Dumlu, Aydıntepe =

Dumlu
- Village
- Location within Turkey
- Country: Turkey
- Province: Bayburt
- District: Aydıntepe
- Population (2021): 81
- Time zone: UTC+3 (TRT)

Dumlu is a village in the Aydıntepe District, Bayburt Province, Turkey. Its population is 81 (2021).

Dumlu is a small mountain village located. Postal Code is 69500.

Coordinates: approximately 40°32′34.55″ N, 40°12′40.03″ E.

== History ==
The former name of the village was Hanege.
