= Dut, Kâhta =

Village in Adıyaman Province, Turkey

Dut
- Village
- Location within Turkey
- Coordinates: 37.727°N 38.537°E
- Country: Turkey
- Province: Adıyaman
- District: Kâhta
- Population (2021): 228
- Time zone: UTC+3 (TRT)

Dut (Kurdish: Tot) is a village in the Kâhta District, Adıyaman Province, Turkey. The village is populated by Kurds of the Kawan tribe and had a population of 228 in 2021.

The hamlets of Beşaltı and Menderes are attached to Dut.
