= Arılı, Kahta =

Village in Adıyaman Province, Turkey

Arılı
- Village
- Location within Turkey
- Coordinates: 37.745°N 38.512°E
- Country: Turkey
- Province: Adıyaman
- District: Kâhta
- Population (2021): 224
- Time zone: UTC+3 (TRT)

Arılı (Kurdish: Bircik) is a village in the Kâhta District, Adıyaman Province, Turkey. The village is populated by Kurds of the Reşwan tribe and had a population of 224 in 2021.
