= Çiğdemlik, Aydıntepe =

Çiğdemlik
- Village
- Location within Turkey
- Coordinates: 40.4465°N 40.2645°E
- Country: Turkey
- Province: Bayburt
- District: Aydıntepe
- Population (2021): 176
- Time zone: UTC+3 (TRT)

Çiğdemlik is a village in the Aydıntepe District, Bayburt Province, Turkey. Its population is 176 (2021).

== History ==
The former name of the village was Gütgüne.
