= Şahintepe, Kahta =

Village in Adıyaman Province, Turkey

Şahintepe
- Village
- Location within Turkey
- Coordinates: 37.722°N 38.616°E
- Country: Turkey
- Province: Adıyaman
- District: Kâhta
- Population (2021): 212
- Time zone: UTC+3 (TRT)

Şahintepe (Kurdish: Bildiyan) is a village in the Kâhta District, Adıyaman Province, Turkey. The village is populated by Kurds of the Bezikan tribe and had a population of 212 in 2021.
