= Mülk, Kahta =

Village in Adıyaman Province, Turkey

Mülkköy
- Village
- Location within Turkey
- Coordinates: 37.737°N 38.620°E
- Country: Turkey
- Province: Adıyaman
- District: Kâhta
- Population (2021): 455
- Time zone: UTC+3 (TRT)

Mülk (Kurdish: Milk) is a village in the Kâhta District, Adıyaman Province, Turkey. The village is populated by Kurds of the Bêzikan tribe and had a population of 455 in 2021.
