= Çaltılı, Kahta =

Village in Adıyaman Province, Turkey

Çaltılı
- Village
- Location within Turkey
- Coordinates: 37.8667°N 38.5167°E
- Country: Turkey
- Province: Adıyaman
- District: Kâhta
- Population (2021): 429
- Time zone: UTC+3 (TRT)

Çaltılı (Kurdish: Sela) is a village in the Kâhta District, Adıyaman Province, Turkey. The village is populated by Kurds of the Îzol tribe and had a population of 429 in 2021.
