= Çukurtaş, Kahta =

Village in Adıyaman Province, Turkey

Çukurtaş
- Village
- Location within Turkey
- Coordinates: 37.863°N 38.567°E
- Country: Turkey
- Province: Adıyaman
- District: Kâhta
- Population (2021): 305
- Time zone: UTC+3 (TRT)

Çukurtaş (Kurdish: Markîk) is a village in the Kâhta District, Adıyaman Province, Turkey. The village is populated by Kurds of the Îzol tribe and had a population of 305 in 2021.

The hamlets of Kazanlı and Kovalı are attached to the village.
