= Akkavak, Kahta =

Village in Adıyaman Province, Turkey

Akkavak
- Village
- Location within Turkey
- Coordinates: 37.840°N 38.703°E
- Country: Turkey
- Province: Adıyaman
- District: Kâhta
- Population (2021): 158
- Time zone: UTC+3 (TRT)

Akkavak (Kurdish: Aşûrge) is a village in the Kâhta District, Adıyaman Province, Turkey. The village is populated by Kurds of the Reşwan tribe and had a population of 158 in 2021.
