= Güçlü (disambiguation) =

Güçlü is a Turkish surname.

Güçlü may also refer to the following settlements in Turkey:

- Güçlü, Cizre, a village in Şırnak Province
- Güçlü, Demirözü, a village in Bayburt Province
- Güçlü, Kızıltepe, a village in Mardin Province
- Güçlü, Lice, a neighbourhood in Diyarbakır Province
- Güçlü, Silvan, a neighbourhood in Diyarbakır Province
- Güçlü, Yüksekova, a village in Hakkâri Province

Güçlü refers to an element in Turkish makam theory.
