= Malik Ismail II =

Assyrian Malik of the Tyari tribe

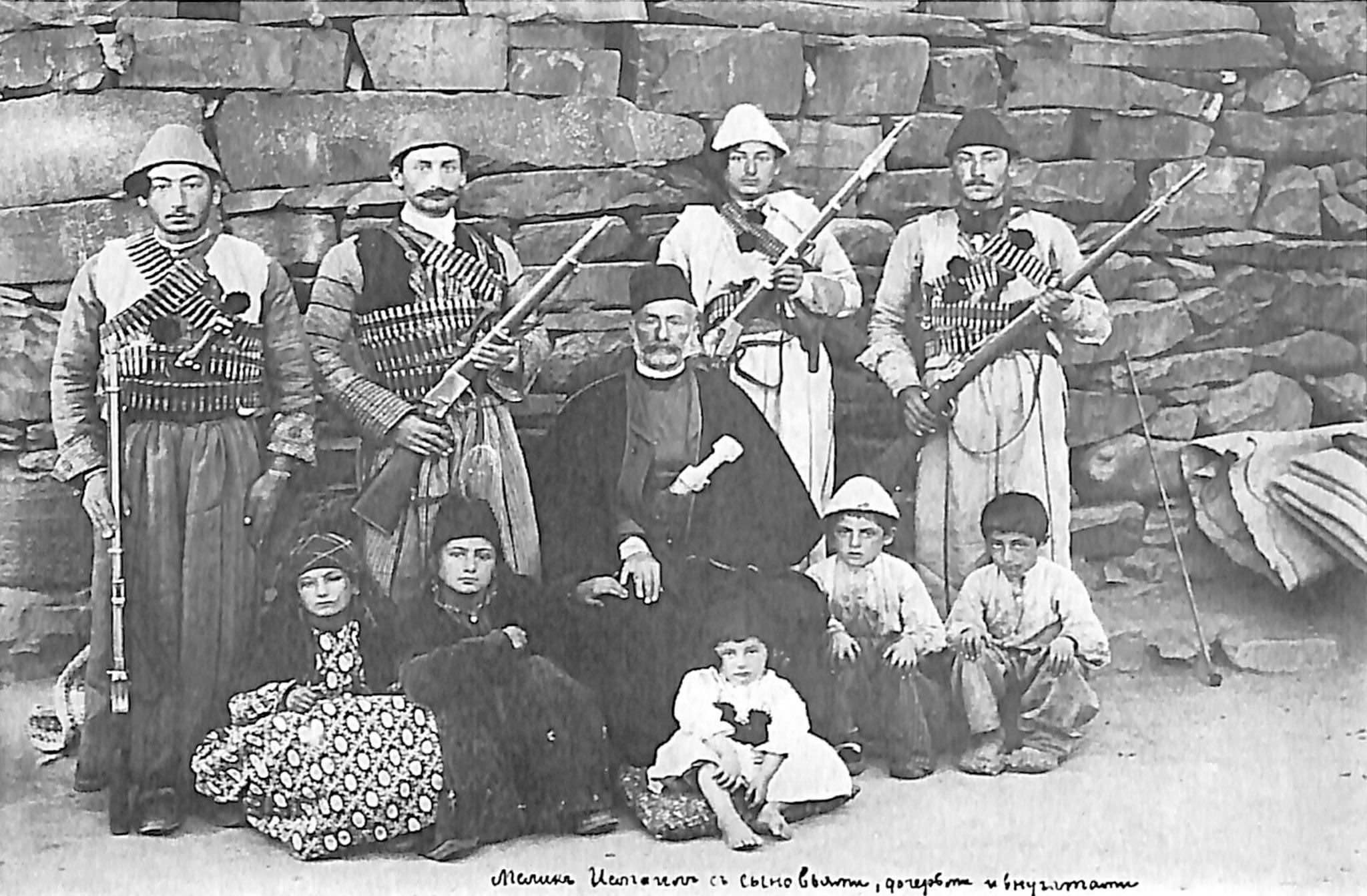
- Malik Ismail II of Upper Tyari (middle), surrounded by his children and grandchildren. Standing (left to right) are his sons Daniel, Shlimon, Yaqu (later Malik Yaqo) and Dinkha
- Born: 1854; Chamba, Ottoman Empire
- Died: 4 June, 1936; Hinaidi, Iraq
- Burial place: Hinaidi (later moved to St Mary al-Tahira Church in 1970)
- Children: Malik Yaqo, Dinkha, Daniel, Shlemon.
- Military career
- Allegiance: Upper Tyari Tribe; Assyrian volunteers, Assyrian Levies
- Service years: 1885-1936
- Nickname: Ismail Beg
- Conflicts: Battle of Chamba; Hakkari Expedition 1916; Assyrian rebellion Assyrian–Kurdish clashes (1895–1900)

Malik Ismail II of Upper Tyareh (Syriac: ܡܲܠܝܼܟ ܐܝܼܣܡܲܥܝܼܠ ܒܝܼܬ, lit. 'Malik Ismail 2') (1854–1936) was a prominent Assyrian malik (chief) of the Tyari tribe (Bit Tyareh), who was born in Chamba, which was the capital of upper Tyari. His father was Shlimon who was one of the two surviving sons of Malik Ismail I. The Ottoman Turks later referred to him as "Ismail Beg".

== Early life ==
Malik Ismail was born in Chamba, capital of Upper Tyareh, in the year 1854. His father was Shlimon, who was one of the surviving sons of Malik Ismail I. Ismail was the father of Malik Yaqo, who played a significant role in Assyrian history of the 20th century. Malik Ismail’s grandfather Malik Ismail I had fought bravely against Bedir Khan Beg’s forces in 1843, defending Upper Tyari’s autonomy and status until his last breath.

== Reign of Tyari and Hakkari ==
Malik Ismail II, reigning from 1885-1936, was the most powerful Assyrian chieftain who ever lived in Hakkari and furthermore, it can be argued that by 1905, he was the most powerful leader in all of Hakkari which caused the Ottoman authorities to treat him with all the respect and honor like a prince of Hakkari.

Malik Ismail II was known for being merciful, even towards enemies. During one incident, a group of Kurdish men who had ambushed and killed four Tyari men sought refuge in his home, fearing retaliation. After confessing their crime, they begged for his protection, which he granted. When Tyari tribesmen advanced toward Chamba seeking revenge, Malik Ismail attempted to discourage them. Despite his efforts, they insisted, saying: "It is no good, Malik, you have done your best, but we must have our revenge, and that is our last word. Stand out the way."

In response, Malik Ismail stood on a bridge and declared: "If that is your last word, now hear mine. These men are my guests now, and have eaten my bread and are in my house. What they did before is nothing to me, and if it were my own brother they had killed I would guard them now, and if you dare to attack, I and mine will defend them, and you will have to kill your own chief before you lay a hand on any one of his guests."

The Tyari tribe could raise an armed force which made up of 5,000 to 6,000 soldiers in 1895, under the reign of Malik Ismail II. The tribe would go on to defeat 3 regular Ottoman battalions that were sent to subdue them for having attacked Muslim villages in 1890.

In late December 1899, Malik Ismail II led a force of 600 Tyari Assyrians under his command in a series of raids and the plundering of several Muslim Kurdish villages in the Levin Valley, carried out as an act of vengeance.

In 1907, With Malik Ismail II as Chieftain, the Ottomans sent troops to Hakkari to stop the fighting between the Assyrians of Tyari and Kurds. The Ottoman troops were successful in subduing the Kurds. The Assyrians of Tyari, however, defeated them and the Ottomans were routed and had their weapons seized.

== World War I ==
Malik Ismail II was one of the many Malik’s who served as a commander of the Assyrian volunteers throughout the course of World War I, he participated in several military engagements that defeated the Ottoman Turks and Kurds on multiple occasions.

=== Battle of Chamba (12–15 June 1915) ===
The Battle of Chamba was fought between the Assyrian defenders led by Malik Ismail II, and Artushi Kurdish forces under a certain Ismail Agha of Julamerk from 12-15 June 1915, which resulted in an Assyrian victory and a Kurdish retreat.

=== Battle of Chal (May 1916) ===
A Battle in the Kurdish mountains took place in May 1916, in the village of Chal. The Assyrian force had at the time split into 2 separate groups, one under Malik Ismail II and the other one under Dawid Mar Shimun. On 27 May, the Assyrian forces met up in the village of Chal launched the attack. After a fierce engagement with the Kurdish enemy, six of the best and most inaccessible castles of Chal were destroyed by the Assyrians, along with a couple of houses.

== Death ==
Malik Ismail II died at Hinaidi, Iraq in 1936, after previously being sick in Baghdad. His remains were later moved to St. Mary's Assyrian Church in Baghdad in the 1970s. Malik Yaqo, one of his sons, became his successor as the next Malik of Upper Tyareh.

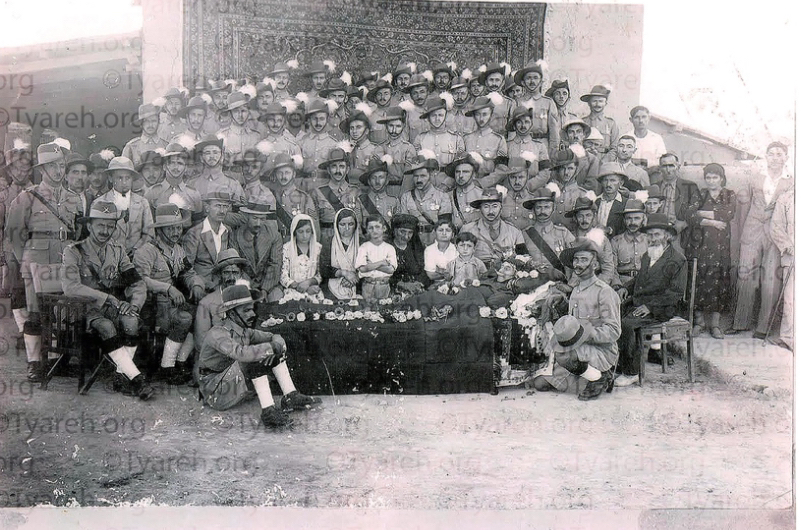
Malik Ismail II’s funeral in 1936

== See also ==
- Malik Yaqo
- Battle of Chamba
- Tyari
- Assyrian Levies
