= Çavuşköy =

Çavuşköy can refer to the following places in Turkey:

- Çavuşköy, Amasya, a village in Amasya District, Amasya Province
- Çavuşköy, Araç, a village in Araç District, Kastamonu Province
- Çavuşköy, Arguvan, a neighbourhood in Arguvan, Malatya Province
- Çavuşköy, Babaeski, a village in Babaeski District, Kırklareli Province
- Çavuşköy, Bayramiç, a village in Bayramiç District, Çanakkale Province
- Çavuşköy, Bilecik, a village in Bilecik Province
- Çavuşköy, Cizre, a village in Şırnak Province
- Çavuşköy, Enez, a village in Edirne Province
- Çavuşköy, Gümüşhacıköy, a village in Gümüşhacıköy District, Amasya Province
- Çavuşköy, İnegöl, a neighbourhood in İnegöl, Bursa Province
- Çavuşköy, Karacabey, a neighbourhood in Karacabey, Bursa Province
- Çavuşköy, Karayazı, a neighbourhood in Erzurum Province
- Çavuşköy, Lapseki, a village in Lapseki District, Çanakkale Province
- Çavuşköy, Malkara, a neighbourhood in Malkara, Tekirdağ Province
- Çavuşköy, Manavgat, a neighbourhood in Antalya Province
- Çavuşköy, Manyas, a neighbourhood in Balıkesir Province
- Çavuşköy, Mustafakemalpaşa, a neighbourhood in Mustafakemalpaşa, Bursa Province
- Çavuşköy, Patnos, a village in Patnos District, Ağrı Province
- Çavuşköy, Pınarbaşı, a village in Pınarbaşı District, Kastamonu Province
- Çavuşköy, Refahiye, a village in Erzincan Province
- Çavuşköy, Şereflikoçhisar, a neighbourhood in Ankara Province
- Çavuşköy, Sungurlu, a village in Çorum Province
- Çavuşköy, Ulus, a village in Bartın Province
- Çavuşköy, Vize, a village in Vize District, Kırklareli Province

== See also ==
- Adrasan, Kumluca, also known as Çavuşköy
