= Havuzlu =

Havuzlu may refer to the following settlements in Turkey:

- Havuzlu, Bor, a village in Niğde Province
- Havuzlu, Cizre, a village in Şırnak Province
- Havuzlu, Ovacık, a village in Tunceli Province
- Havuzlu, Yusufeli, a village in Artvin Province
