= Battle of Chamba =

1915 assault on Chamba

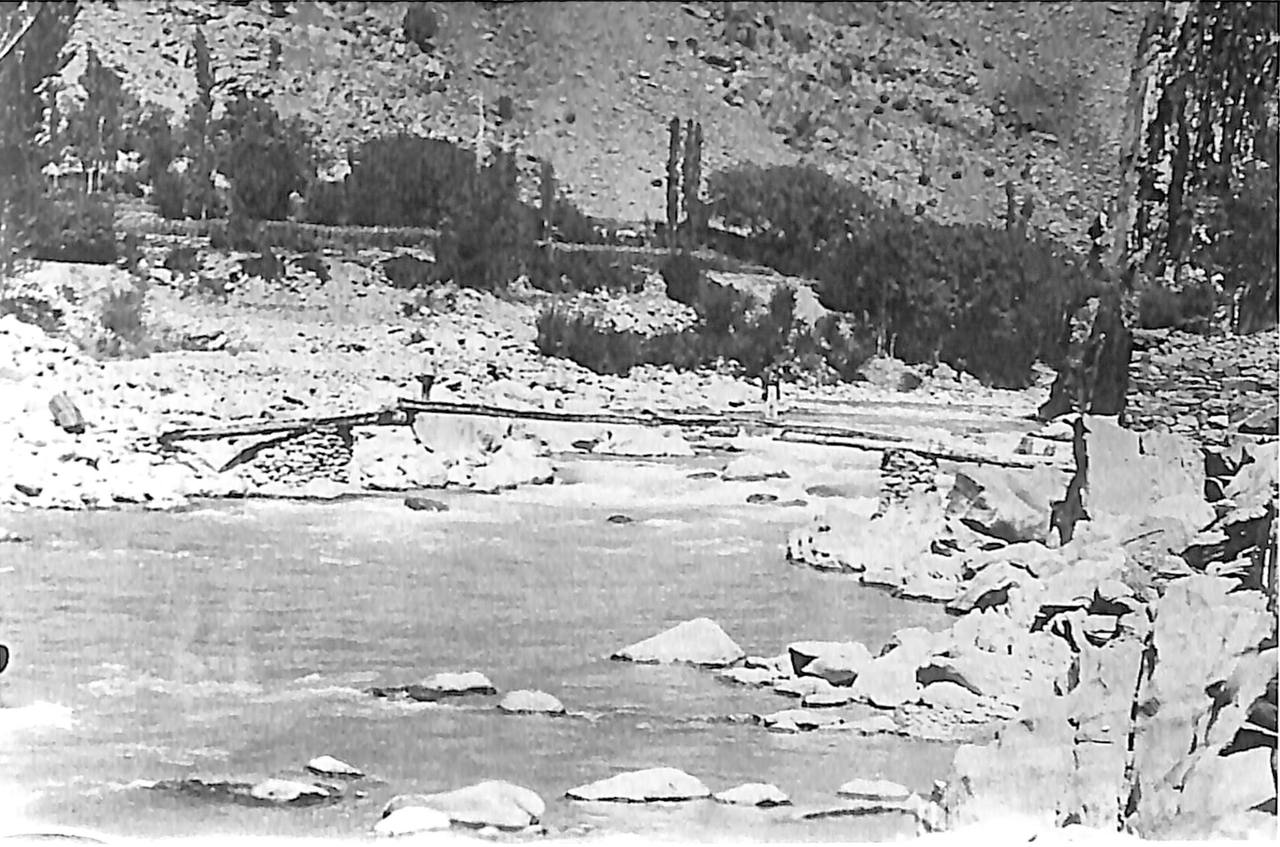
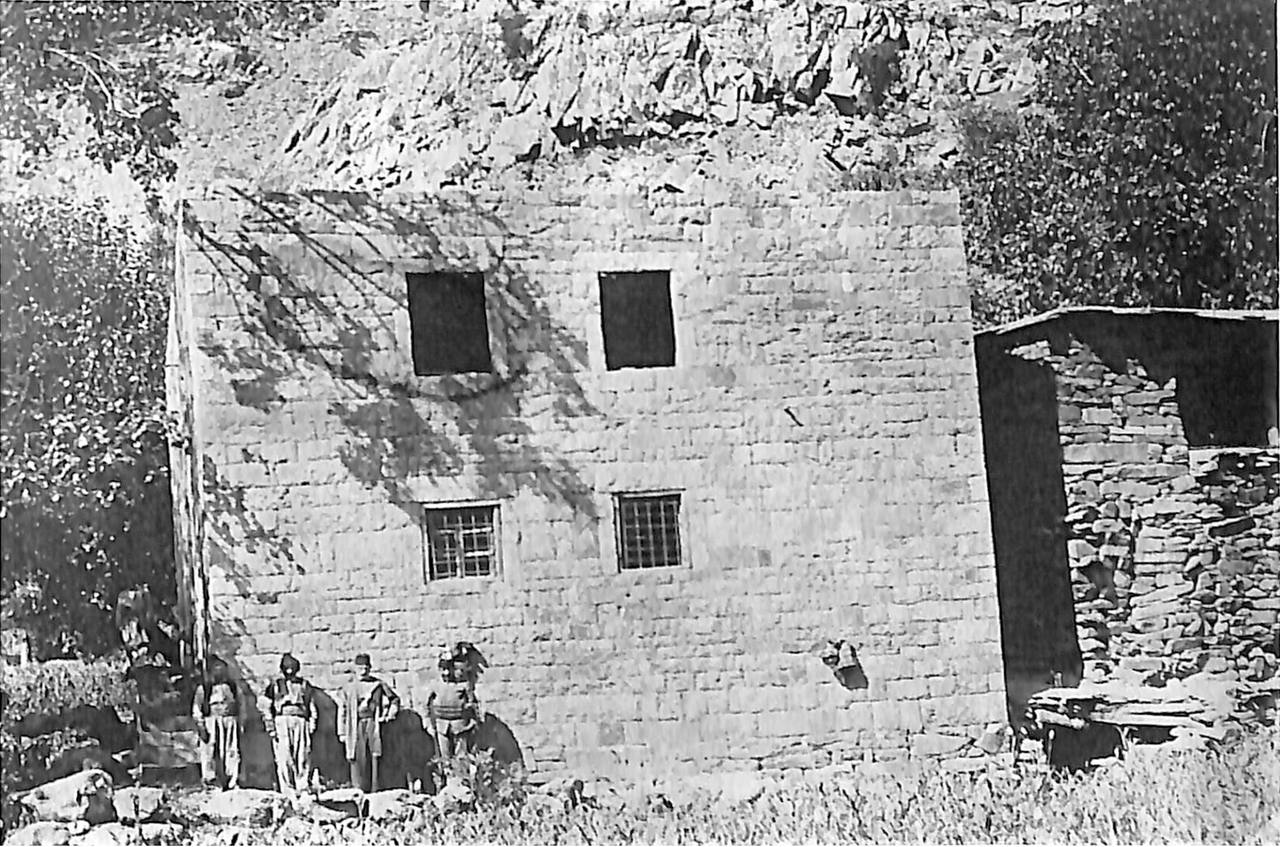
- From left to right A bridge in Chamba, Hakkari, in 1912. House of Malik Ismail II guarded by Assyrian fighters.
| Date | 12–15 June, 1915 |
| Location | Chamba, Hakkâri, Ottoman Empire |
| Result | Assyrian victory |

Belligerents
| Tyari Assyrians | Artushi Kurds |

Commanders and leaders
| Malik Ismail II; Deacon Dinkha | Ismail Agha; Rashid Beg; Haider Beg; Soto Agha |

Strength
| 100 (reinforcement) | Unknown |

Casualties and losses
| 7 killed 16 wounded | 15 killed 40 Rifles abandoned |

The Battle of Chamba (12-15 June 1915) was a military engagement during World War I between Assyrian defenders led by Malik Ismail II, an Assyrian tribal leader, and Artushi Kurdish forces under Ismail Agha of Julamerk in the village of Chamba, Hakkari. This confrontation took place in an attempt to exterminate the Assyrian Christians of the Ottoman Empire during the Sayfo.

== Background ==
The Assyrian patriarch Mar Benyamin Shimun declared war on the Ottomans after they executed his brother, which they did this as a warning in demand that the Assyrians should stay neutral during the war. As a result, the Assyrians took the opportunity to ally with the Russians after they promised an independent Assyrian Christian state.

This declaration of war would shortly lead to the Kurdish chieftains of Hakkari to form a coalition against the Assyrians during the Sayfo of 1915, in order to expel or get rid of the Assyrians of Hakkari by any means. The coalition contained of multiple Kurdish tribal chiefs such as the Emir of Upper Berwar, Reshid Bey, Ismail Agha of Julamerk, Said Agha, and Suto Agha.

== Battle ==
The conflict in Chamba began when Assyrian scouts, led by Deacon Dinkha, the son of Malik Ismail II, had noticed the movements of the Artushi Kurdish army of Ismail Agha, which had previously resided between Yellow Water and Kani Khale. On 13 June, a confrontation broke out when Dinkha’s 22 men engaged the Kurds near Suwareh camp but were forced to retreat after a two-hour battle.

The Assyrians regrouped at stronger defensive positions near Kamaka Beybuneh and Sheeva d’Gelleh, fighting off any further attacks and inflicting high casualties. That evening, a Kurdish soldier set fire to a house in order to create confusion, allowing the Kurds to enter the village, which led to Dinkha reporting the developments directly to Malik Ismail II.

In response to this, Malik Ismail mobilized his forces and sent out spies and messages to other Assyrian villages. On 14 June, fighting escalated across the region. Anticipating encirclement by the forces of Rashid Beg and Haidar Beg, Malik then ordered a retreat across the river to Beh Delyata. That night, Assyrian reinforcements had arrived, and about 100 fighters took up positions at the "Rock of Crucifixion."

On 15 June, the Kurdish forces advanced, believing the Assyrian positions to be abandoned. When they entered the village of Chamba and began looting, the Assyrians ambushed them from hidden positions, leading to an engagement. Surrounded and disoriented, the defeated Kurdish fighters fled toward Kalitan, suffering fifteen dead and abandoning 40 rifles. The Assyrians lost seven men and had sixteen wounded, emerging victorious at the end.

== Aftermath ==
Despite the victories, many Assyrians fell victims to the ongoing genocide. Mar Benyamin Shimun however, led some surviving 50,000 Assyrians out of the mountains and into Russian controlled Qajar Iran. The Assyrians of Malik Ismail II would later depart from Urmia in 1916 and embark on an expedition in Hakkari to fight off these Ottoman and Kurdish forces that previously subjugated them the year prior.

== See also ==
- Malik Ismail II
- Julamerk
- Hakkari expedition of 1916
- Hakkari

== Sources ==
- Werda, Joel E. (1924). The Flickering Light of Asia or The Assyrian Nation and Church (PDF).
