= Battle of Dayrabun =

Armed conflict between two groups

Date	4–5 August 1933
Location	Dayrabun
Result	Assyrian victory

Belligerents
(Assyrian homeland) Assyrians	Iraq: Allied Kurdish tribes; Allied Arab tribes; Supported by: (United Kingdom) Britain

Commanders and leaders
Malik Yaqo; Malik Loko	Bakr Sidqi

Units involved
Tyari; Tkhuma	Iraqi Armed Forces; Iraqi Air Force

Strength
Less than 800	More than 5,000

Casualties and losses
13 killed, 11 wounded	At least 150 killed

The Battle of Dayabun or Faishkhabour was fought between Assyrians and the Iraqi army on August 4-5 in 1933.

== Background ==
A group of Assyrians being led by Malik Yaqo and Malik Loko left Iraq and went to Syria. However, the Assyrians were told to return to Iraq and that they would be allowed to return in peace.

== Battle ==
A small group of Assyrians began to cross the Faysh Khabur river. However, an Iraqi plane gave a signal to the Iraqi forces that were entrenched, and they began firing at the Assyrians. The Assyrians withheld fire as their families were still in Iraq. The cries of the wounded Assyrians convinced them that unless they retaliated, their entire group would be massacred. Assyrians then attacked under no cover and the Iraqis ran to their camp to fortify themselves.

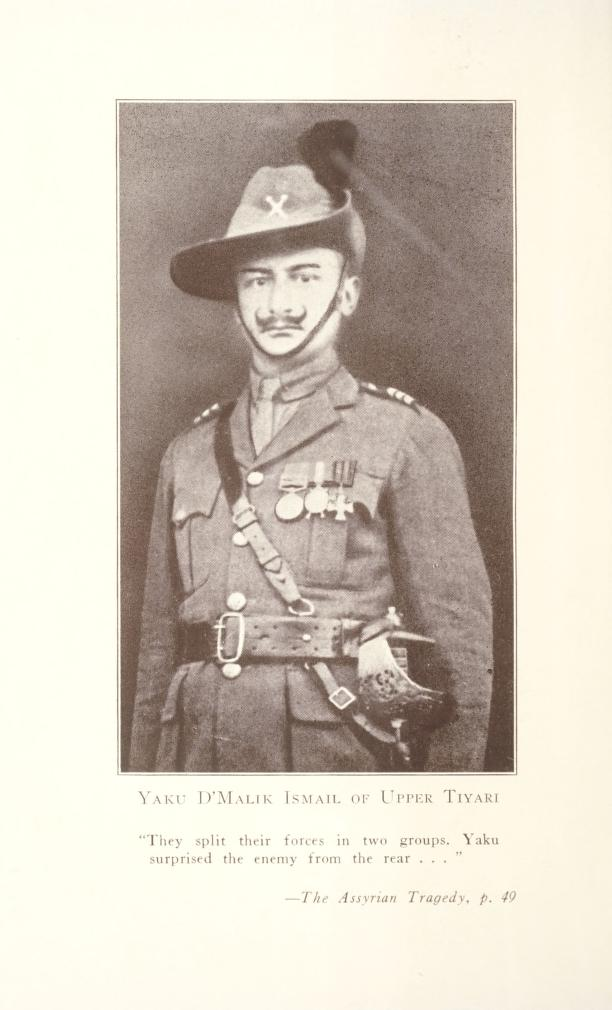
Malik Yaqo

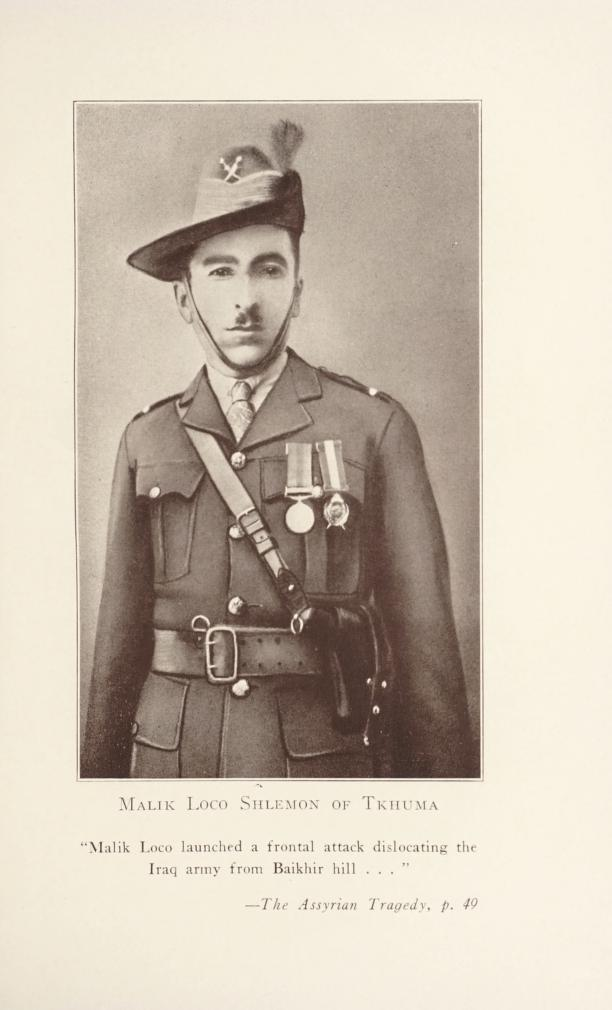
Malik Loko

On the evening of August 4, the Iraqi army went on the offensive. The Iraqis attempted to encircle the Assyrians from the north side but were forced to retreat after they were met with rifle fire from an Assyrian platoon under the command of Rayis Warda of Halmon. The Assyrians armed only with rifles counterattacked and inflicted very heavy casualties on the Iraqis. The Iraqi army was broken and retreated where they faced difficulty going through a field full of thorns. When the Iraqis made it to their headquarters, they were attacked by their fellow Iraqi soldiers because they thought they were Assyrians mounting an attack. Many Iraqis were slaughtered in this attack. A group of young Assyrians under the command of Rayis Hormizd of Mazraya encircled Iraqi trucks that were bringing weapons for their soldiers in the battle. Assyrians took the men bringing the supplies as prisoners and cut off the route preventing supplies from reaching the Iraqi army .

On August 5, Assyrians captured the mount of Chai Bekhair in a decisive attack by Malik Loko where the Iraqi army was strongly entrenched. After the two Iraqi trenches fell, 45 of their corpses were discovered by Assyrians. Iraqi airplanes attacked throughout this battle in order to blow up ammunition that was captured by Assyrians and killed 3 of their own officers that were detained by Assyrians in a tent. The Assyrians that were stuck on the river and shore were rescued.

After the Iraqi army was broken, Assyrians gathered to organize themselves for battle as they did not prepare themselves for the previous skirmishes. During the day, Assyrians were unable to mount an attack as the field was open and they would be subject to Iraqi bombardment from their air force. Iraqi planes arrived from Mosul and dropped bombs on the area and injured Malik Loko. Some Assyrians then decided to go to the village of Derekeh where the wounded Malik Loko was being treated, which disappointed Malik Yaqo as he was planning to attack the broken Iraqi army. Malik Yaqo and his men were stopped by the French government and were brought to a city close to Hasakah. The Iraqi army was equipped with every piece of modern equipment as well as motor transport during this battle.

== Aftermath ==
Most of the Assyrian fighters returned to Syria. Some Assyrians went back to their villages to protect their families. Some of those who returned to their villages surrendered their weapons as Iraqi airplanes dropped leaflets stating those who surrendered would be pardoned and would in no way be injured. Those who surrendered their weapons were shot dead without trial. Malik Yaqo stated after the battle that the Iraqi army proved themselves to be exceptional cowards during the battle of Faishkhabour.
