= Malik Yaqo =

Assyrian tribal leader (1894-1974)

Malik Yaqo d'Malik Ismail ܡܠܟ ܝܥܩܘܒ ܐܝܫܡܥܝܠ
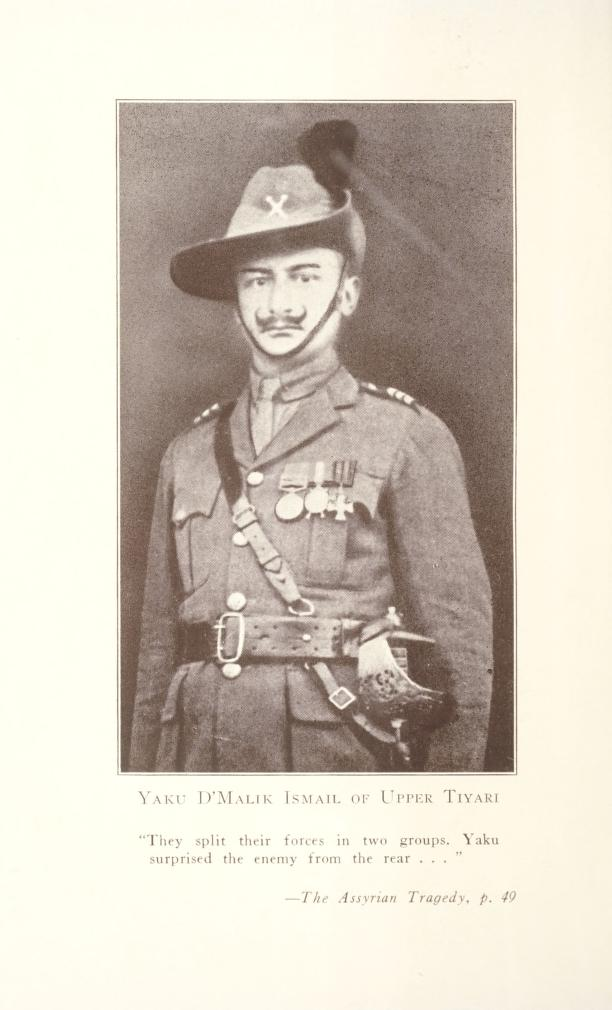
- Malik Yaqo in his Levy uniform
- Born: February 12, 1894; Tyari, Hakkari, Ottoman Empire
- Died: January 25, 1974 (age 79); Baghdad, Ba'athist Iraq
- Spouse: Maryam Youkhana
- Relatives: Hurmiz Malik Chikko (Nephew); Malik Ismail II (Father); Daniel Malik Ismail (Brother)
- Military career
- Allegiance: Upper Tyari tribe Assyrian volunteers Assyrian Levies
- Service years: 1914–1941
- Known for: Resistance during the Assyrian Genocide, Commanding Assyrian volunteers, Assyrian Levies
- Conflicts: World War I; Persian campaign; Battle of Charah; Simko Shikak revolt (1926); Kirkuk Massacre of 1924; Mahmud Barzanji revolts; Battle of Dayrabun; World War II

Malik Yaqo Ismail (Syriac: ܡܠܟ ܝܥܩܘܒ ܐܝܫܡܥܝܠ; February 12, 1894 – January 25, 1974) was an Assyrian tribal leader who served as the Malik (chief) of the Upper Tyari tribe, succeeding his father Malik Ismail II. After World War I, he became an officer in the newly organized Assyrian Levies.

== Early life ==
Malik Yaqo Ismail was born on February 12, 1894, in the village of Chamba'd Malik, Tyari, Hakkari. He married on December 26, 1914, Maryam Youkhana, they eventually had three children, respectively: Uya, born in Iraq in 1929, Zia, born in Iraq in 1932, and Daoud, born in Syria in 1935.

== Military career ==
During the First World War He participated in many battles as a fighter, and the first battle he fought as the leader of a group of 50 fighters was against Simko Shikak, the leader of a Kurdish tribe After the martyrdom of Patriarch Mar Benyamin Shimun. He participated in numerous battles during the First World War under the command of his father Malik Ismail II with the Assyrian Volunteers, he had first hand experience from the battles in Hakkari and the exodus to Russian controlled Persia.

He resigned from the Assyrian Levies with the rank of major (ܪܒ ܬܪܝ ܡܐܐ), and after his resignation, he tried to join the newly formed Iraqi army, but that did not happen.

== Simele Massacre ==
Yaqo was accompanied by 200 armed men, which was seen as an act of defiance by the Iraqi authorities. His activities caused distress among the Kurds and the Iraqi government started sending troops to the Nohadra region in order to intimidate Yaqo and dissuade Assyrians from joining his cause.

According to a letter from the Administrative Inspector of Mosul to the Ministry of Interior, on 19 June 1933, Khoshaba, accompanied with Malik Khiyo of Ashitha and Malik Zaia Shams-al-Din of Lower Tyari left from Nohadra to Amadiya against the wishes of the Qaimmaqam who warned Khoshaba that Malik Yaqo was awaiting him on the road with at least 80 armed men. This resulted in the Mustarrif sending Iraqi police to ensure Khoshaba and his companions were not harmed and further drove the split between the factions.

=== Battle of Dirabun ===
On 21 July 1933, more than 600 Assyrians, led by Malik Yaqo, crossed the border into Syria in hope of receiving asylum from the French Mandate of Syria. They were, however, disarmed and refused asylum, and were subsequently given light arms and sent back to Iraq on 4 August. They then decided to surrender themselves to the Iraqi Army. While crossing the Tigris in the Assyrian village of Dirabun, a clash erupted between the Assyrians and an Iraqi Army brigade. Despite the advantage of heavy artillery, the Iraqis were driven back to their military base in Dirabun. The Assyrians, convinced that the army had targeted them deliberately, attacked an army barracks with little success. They were driven back to Syria upon the arrival of Iraqi aeroplanes. The Iraqi Army lost 33 soldiers during the fighting while the Assyrian irregulars took fewer casualties. Historians do not agree on who started the clashes at the border. The British Administrative Inspector for Mosul, Lieutenant Colonel R. R. Stafford, wrote that the Assyrians had no intention of clashing with the Iraqis, while the Iraqi historian Khaldun Husry (son of the prominent Arab nationalist Sati' al-Husri) claims that it was Yaqu's men who provoked the army at Dirabun.

these clashes would subsequently be a precursor to the Simele Massacre.

== Political life ==
In November 1969, he came to northern Iraq, accompanied by a delegation from the Assyrian societies in the United States of America, to meet the late leader of the Kurdish revolution (Mullah Mustafa Barzani), where Malik Yaqo asked him about the ultimate goal of the Kurdish revolution, and Mullah Barzani replied that the Kurds seek to establish a federal Iraq Then Malik Yako asked him: What about the Assyrians, many of whom are fighting on your side? Barzani admitted this by mentioning Malik Yaqo's nephew Hurmiz Malik Chikko, the Reverend Paul Bidari (a member of the Central Committee of the Kurdistan Democratic Party), the martyr hero Margaret George and others. Mullah Barzani gave him an honorable promise that the Assyrians would surely obtain autonomy if the Kurdish revolution succeeded. Mullah Mustafa was very tactful in agreeing to many of Malik Yaqo's proposals.

He returned to Iraq on February 26, 1973, at the invitation of the Minister of Interior Saadoun Ghaidan. But the proposals and projects presented to him were more misleading than trying to improve the conditions of the Assyrians in Iraq. As it became clear to him that the Iraqi government's offer to arm the Assyrian villages and towns adjacent to the Kurdish region is in order to serve the regime and its goals. It did not focus at all on the interests of the Assyrian people. He died on Friday January 25, 1974.

He would be the final Malik (Chief) of Upper Tyari tribe.

== Books ==
- Assyrians and The Two World Wars ASIN B08ND956WB

== See also ==
- Malik Ismail II
- Battle of Dayrabun
- 1924 Kirkuk massacre
- Battle of Charah
- Assyrian Levies
