= Kocapınar =

Kocapınar (literally "big spring" in Turkish) may refer to the following places in Turkey:

- Kocapınar, Burdur
- Kocapınar, Cizre
- Kocapınar, Elmalı, a village in Elmalı district of Antalya Province
- Kocapınar, Gönen, a village
- Kocapınar, Silifke, a village in Silifke district of Mersin Province
