= Hurmiz Malik Chikko =

Assyrian activist and armed-resistance leader

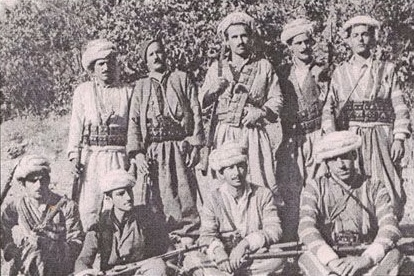
- Chikko (second from the left in the back row) with his men
- Born: 1934; Diana, Kingdom of Iraq
- Died: December 2, 1963 (aged 28–29); Aloka, Iraq
- Relatives: Malik Chikko (father); Malik Yaqo (uncle); Gewargis Malik Chikko (brother)
- Military career
- Service years: 1958–1963
- Conflicts: First Iraqi-Kurdish War

Hurmiz Malik Chikko (Note: His name is also rendered Hormiz Malek Chikko) (Syriac: ܗܘܪܡܘܙ ܡܵܠܸܟ ܟ̰ܝܟܘ; 1934 - December 2, 1963) was an Iraqi Assyrian rebel leader and insurgent. He led the Assyrian armed struggle against successive Iraqi governments from the late 1950s–primarily during the First Iraqi–Kurdish War–until his death in 1963. He also promoted Assyrian autonomy in the Nineveh Plains.

== Early life and family ==
Chikko was born in 1934 in the village of Diana, Northern Iraq. He was the son of Malik Chikko of the clan of Dadosh, Upper Tyari, and the nephew of Malik Yaqo, leader (malik) of the Upper Tyari tribe. His older brother was Gewargis Malik Chikko, another Assyrian advocate who was the head of the High Committee of Christian affairs in Iraq and a founding member of the Chicago-branch of the Assyrian Universal Alliance.

== Assyrian activism ==
Chikko commanded the Assyrian front against successive Iraqi governments in the late 1950s and early 1960s. His goals were to gain autonomy for Assyrians in Iraq, protect Assyrian and Yazidi lands in the northern Iraq from Arabization and Kurdification policies, and to protect the local Assyrian and Yazidi communities from the crossfire of the conflict between the Iraqi Central Government and Kurdish leadership.

== Death ==
Chikko was killed in the Battle of Aloka on December 2, 1963, at the age of 29, along with six other Assyrian fighters. His death was thought by many to be a turning point that would allow for even more persecution of Assyrians in Kore Gavana, the Assyrian village that he lived in for most of his life. Kore Gavana, along with many other Assyrian-majority villages in Iraq's Dohuk Governorate, were eventually annexed by the Kurdistan Regional Government.

== Legacy ==
Chikko is viewed by many Assyrians and Yazidis today as a martyr for their protection during a time of instability, as well as a martyr for the Assyrian nationalist cause. He and his family are mentioned in the Assyrian songs Chikko by Sargon Gabriel and Korehgawana by Juliana Jendo.

There was controversy among the international Assyrian community during the 2017 Kurdistan Region independence referendum, when an image of Chikko's statue in the village of Kore Gavana covered with Kurdish flags was surfaced. This was seen by many Assyrians as an attempt by the Kurdistan Regional Government to Kurdify Chikko's Assyrian nationalist legacy.
