= Bespin (disambiguation) =

Bespin is a cloud city planet in the Star Wars universe.

Bespin may also refer to:

- Mozilla Skywriter (formerly Mozilla Bespin), a code editor developed by Mozilla Labs

== See also ==
- Beşpınar (disambiguation)
