= Işıkova, Demirözü =

Işıkova
- Village
- Location in Turkey
- Coordinates: 40°06′N 39°54′E
- Country: Turkey
- Province: Bayburt
- District: Demirözü
- Population (2021): 28
- Time zone: UTC+3 (TRT)

Işıkova is a village in the Demirözü District, Bayburt Province, Turkey. Its population is 28 (2021).

== History ==
The former name of the village was Cenci.
