= Petekli, Demirözü =

Petekli
- Village
- Location within Turkey
- Country: Turkey
- Province: Bayburt
- District: Demirözü
- Population (2021): 98
- Time zone: UTC+3 (TRT)

Petekli is a village in the Demirözü District, Bayburt Province, Turkey. Its population is 98 (2021).

== History ==
The former name of the village was Çorezma.
