= Taşhöyük, Cizre =

Village in Şırnak Province, Turkey

Taşhöyük
- Village
- Location within Turkey
- Coordinates: 37.209°N 42.056°E
- Country: Turkey
- Province: Şırnak
- District: Cizre
- Population (2021): 385
- Time zone: UTC+3 (TRT)

Taşhöyük (Kurdish: Girgevir) is a village in the Cizre District of Şırnak Province in Turkey. The village is populated by Kurds of the Amara, Meman and Omerkan tribes and had a population of 385 in 2021.
