= Yakacık, Cizre =

Village in Şırnak Province, Turkey

Yakacık
- Village
- Location within Turkey
- Coordinates: 37.292°N 42.234°E
- Country: Turkey
- Province: Şırnak
- District: Cizre
- Population (2021): 632
- Time zone: UTC+3 (TRT)

Yakacık (Kurdish: Fêrîsî) is a village in the Cizre District of Şırnak Province in Turkey. The village is populated by Kurds of the Tayan tribe and had a population of 632 in 2021.
