= Yakupabdal, Demirözü =

Yakupabdal
- Village
- Location within Turkey
- Country: Turkey
- Province: Bayburt
- District: Demirözü
- Population (2021): 171
- Time zone: UTC+3 (TRT)

Yakupabdal is a village in the Demirözü District, Bayburt Province, Turkey. Its population is 171 (2021).
