= Demirözü =

- Municipality
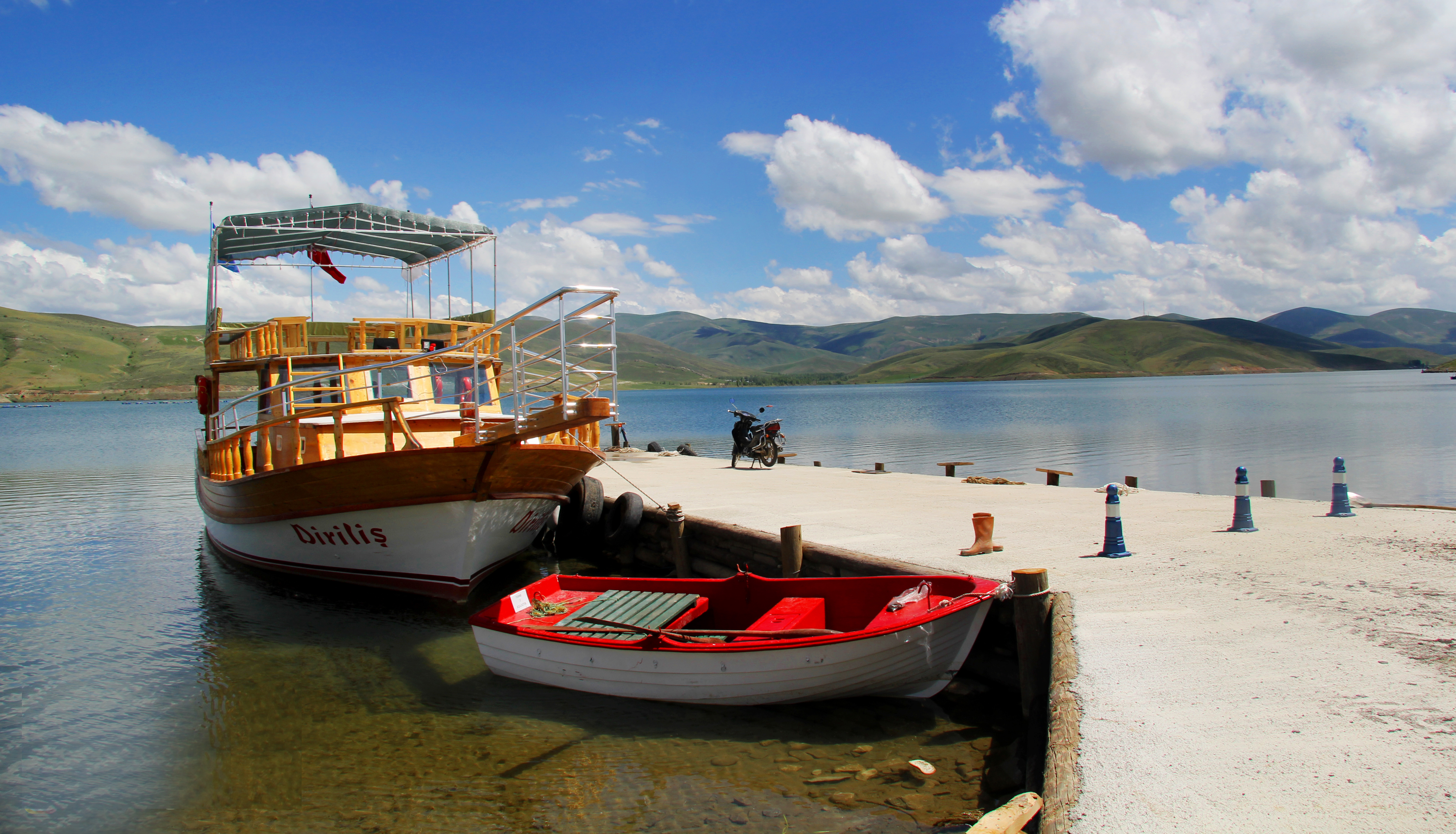
- Demirözü Reservoir

- Location within Turkey
- Coordinates: 40°09′50″N 39°53′33″E
- Country: Turkey
- Province: Bayburt
- District: Demirözü

Government
  - Mayor: Arslan Gürer (AKP)
- Population (2021): 3,771
- Time zone: UTC+3 (TRT)
- Postal code: 69400
- Website: www.demirozu.bel.tr

Demirözü is a town in Bayburt Province in the Black Sea region of Turkey. It is the seat of Demirözü District. Its population is 3,771 (2021). The mayor is Arslan Gürer (AKP).
