= Aşağıkonak, Cizre =

Village in Şırnak Province, Turkey

Aşağıkonak
- Village
- Location within Turkey
- Coordinates: 37.289°N 42.318°E
- Country: Turkey
- Province: Şırnak
- District: Cizre
- Population (2021): 544
- Time zone: UTC+3 (TRT)

Aşağıkonak (Kurdish: Xolana Jêr) is a village in the Cizre District of Şırnak Province in Turkey. It is populated by Kurds of the Tayan tribe, and had a population of 544 in 2021.
