= Elmalı, Demirözü =

Elmalı
- Village
- Location within Turkey
- Coordinates: 39.9984°N 39.7027°E
- Country: Turkey
- Province: Bayburt
- District: Demirözü
- Population (2021): 143
- Time zone: UTC+3 (TRT)

Elmalı is a village in the Demirözü District, Bayburt Province, Turkey. Its population is 143 (2021).
