= Bozalan, Cizre =

Village in Şırnak Province, Turkey

Bozalan
- Village
- Location within Turkey
- Coordinates: 37.331°N 42.235°E
- Country: Turkey
- Province: Şırnak
- District: Cizre
- Population (2021): 1,158
- Time zone: UTC+3 (TRT)

Bozalan (Kurdish: Behmor) is a village in the Cizre District of Şırnak Province in Turkey. The village is populated by Kurds of the Tayan tribe and had a population of 1,158 in 2021.

The six hamlets of Akarsu, Çağlayan, Hisar, İnci, Soğukpınar and Yukarıkonak are attached to Bozalan.
