= Seyrantepe, Cizre =

Village in Şırnak Province, Turkey

Seyrantepe
- Village
- Location within Turkey
- Coordinates: 37.328°N 42.263°E
- Country: Turkey
- Province: Şırnak
- District: Cizre
- Population (2023): 192
- Time zone: UTC+3 (TRT)

Seyrantepe (Kurdish: Bilinda Darê) is a village in the Cizre District of Şırnak Province in Turkey. The village is populated by Kurds of the Tayan tribe and had a population of 192 in 2023.
