= Dirsekli, Cizre =

Village in Şırnak Province, Turkey

Dirsekli
- Village
- Location within Turkey
- Coordinates: 37.355°N 42.180°E
- Country: Turkey
- Province: Şırnak
- District: Cizre
- Population (2021): 6,090
- Time zone: UTC+3 (TRT)

Dirsekli (Kurdish: Baska) is a village in the Cizre District of Şırnak Province in Turkey. The village is populated by Kurds of the Botikan tribe and had a population of 6,090 in 2021.

The hamlets of Dallı, Güzeller and Yamaç are attached to Dirsekli.

Dirsekli was the most populous village in Turkey in 2021.
