= Devetaşı, Demirözü =

Devetaşı
- Village
- Location within Turkey
- Coordinates: 40°05′N 39°51′E
- Country: Turkey
- Province: Bayburt
- District: Demirözü
- Population (2021): 81
- Time zone: UTC+3 (TRT)

Devetaşı is a village in the Demirözü District, Bayburt Province, Turkey. Its population is 81 (2021).

== History ==
The former name of the village was İşhınsor.
