= Pınarcık, Demirözü =

Pınarcık
- Village
- Location within Turkey
- Coordinates: 40.0828°N 39.9372°E
- Country: Turkey
- Province: Bayburt
- District: Demirözü
- Population (2021): 49
- Time zone: UTC+3 (TRT)

Pınarcık is a village in the Demirözü District, Bayburt Province, Turkey. Its population is 49 (2021).

== History ==
The former name of the village was Öksürüç.
