= Çağıllı, Demirözü =

Çağıllı
- Village
- Location within Turkey
- Coordinates: 40.0625°N 39.9317°E
- Country: Turkey
- Province: Bayburt
- District: Demirözü
- Population (2021): 23
- Time zone: UTC+3 (TRT)

Çağıllı is a village in the Demirözü District, Bayburt Province, Turkey. Its population is 23 (2021).

== History ==
The former name of the village was Hanzar.
