= Akyaka, Demirözü =

Akyaka
- Village
- Location within Turkey
- Coordinates: 40.0360°N 39.8861°E
- Country: Turkey
- Province: Bayburt
- District: Demirözü
- Population (2022): 50
- Time zone: UTC+3 (TRT)

Akyaka is a village in the Demirözü District, Bayburt Province, Turkey. Its population was 50 in 2022.

== History ==
The former name of the village was Püşke.
