= Düzova, Cizre =

Village in Şırnak Province, Turkey

Düzova
- Village
- Location within Turkey
- Coordinates: 37.354°N 42.058°E
- Country: Turkey
- Province: Şırnak
- District: Cizre
- Population (2021): 1,256
- Time zone: UTC+3 (TRT)

Düzova (Kurdish: Hoser; Syriac: Awṣar) (Note: Alternatively transliterated as Ausar, Awṣār, Ḥawṣar, Hawṣāra, Hawṣara, Hawsara, or Osār.) is a village in the Cizre District of Şırnak Province in Turkey. The village is populated by Kurds of the Meman tribe and had a population of 1,256 in 2021. It is located in the historic region of Beth Zabday.

== History ==
Awṣar (today called Düzova) is attested in the Legend of Mar Pinḥas, a disciple of Mar Awgin, as the place of his martyrdom in the 4th or 5th century AD. In the Life of John of Nḥel, a man from Awṣar was healed of his sciatica by the saint. The Convent of Mar Pinḥas at Awṣar is mentioned in 1607 and 1610.

== Bibliography ==
- Baz, Ibrahim (2016). Şırnak aşiretleri ve kültürü (in Turkish). ISBN 9786058849631.
- Brock, Sebastian P. (1978). "John of Nḥel: An Episode in Early Seventh-Century Monastic History". Orientalia Lovaniensia Periodica. IX: 95–119.
- Fiey, Jean Maurice (1975). Assyrie Chrétienne (in French). Vol. 2. Imprimerie Catholique de Beyrouth.
- Fiey, Jean Maurice (2004). Lawrence Conrad (ed.). Saints Syriaques (in French). The Darwin Press.
- McCollum, Adam Carter (2013). The Story of Mar Pinḥas. Gorgias Press.
- Palmer, Andrew (1990). Monk and Mason on the Tigris Frontier: The Early History of Tur Abdin. Cambridge University Press.
- Socin, Albert (1881). "Zur Geographie des Ṭur 'Abdīn". Zeitschrift der Deutschen Morgenländischen Gesellschaft. 35: 237–269.
