= Bayrampaşa, Demirözü =

Bayrampaşa
- Village
- Location within Turkey
- Coordinates: 40.1736°N 39.8221°E
- Country: Turkey
- Province: Bayburt
- District: Demirözü
- Population (2021): 64
- Time zone: UTC+3 (TRT)

Bayrampaşa is a village in the Demirözü District, Bayburt Province, Turkey. Its population is 64 (2021).

== History ==
The former name of the village was Hıgnı.
