= Yalıntepe, Cizre =

Village in Şırnak Province, Turkey

Yalıntepe
- Village
- Location within Turkey
- Coordinates: 37.291°N 42.057°E
- Country: Turkey
- Province: Şırnak
- District: Cizre
- Population (2021): 130
- Time zone: UTC+3 (TRT)

Yalıntepe (Kurdish: Bêdar) is a village in the Cizre District of Şırnak Province in Turkey. The village is populated by Kurds of the Amara and Meman tribes and had a population of 130 in 2021.

The hamlet of Kümetaş is attached to Yalıntepe.
