= Keruh, Cizre =

Village in Şırnak Province, Turkey

Keruh
- Village
- Location within Turkey
- Coordinates: 37.287°N 42.281°E
- Country: Turkey
- Province: Şırnak
- District: Cizre
- Population (2021): 263
- Time zone: UTC+3 (TRT)

Keruh (Kurdish: Karox) is a village in the Cizre District of Şırnak Province in Turkey. The village is populated by Kurds of the Zewkan tribe and had a population of 263 in 2021.
