= Eymür, Demirözü =

Eymür
- Village
- Location within Turkey
- Coordinates: 40.1378°N 39.8154°E
- Country: Turkey
- Province: Bayburt
- District: Demirözü
- Population (2021): 83
- Time zone: UTC+3 (TRT)

Eymür is a village in the Demirözü District, Bayburt Province, Turkey. Its population is 83 (2021).
