= Kayaköy, Cizre =

Village in Şırnak Province, Turkey

Kayaköy
- Village
- Location within Turkey
- Coordinates: 37.269°N 42.005°E
- Country: Turkey
- Province: Şırnak
- District: Cizre
- Population (2021): 418
- Time zone: UTC+3 (TRT)

Kayaköy (Kurdish: Pêlisî) is a village in the Cizre District of Şırnak Province in Turkey. The village is populated by Kurds of the Elîkan tribe and had a population of 418 in 2021.
