= Yeşilyurt, Cizre =

Village in Şırnak Province, Turkey

Yeşilyurt
- Village
- Location within Turkey
- Coordinates: 37.309°N 42.138°E
- Country: Turkey
- Province: Şırnak
- District: Cizre
- Population (2021): 478
- Time zone: UTC+3 (TRT)

Yeşilyurt (Kurdish: Cinibir) is a village in the Cizre District of Şırnak Province in Turkey. The village is populated by Kurds of the Meman tribe and had a population of 478 in 2021.

The hamlets of Fıstıklı, Kömürcü, Üzümlü and Yukarıçeşme are attached to Yeşilyurt.
