= Katran, Cizre =

Village in Şırnak Province, Turkey

Katran
- Village
- Location within Turkey
- Coordinates: 37.254°N 42.106°E
- Country: Turkey
- Province: Şırnak
- District: Cizre
- Population (2021): 1,876
- Time zone: UTC+3 (TRT)

Katran (Kurdish: Bazift) is a village in the Cizre District of Şırnak Province in Turkey. The village is populated by Kurds of the Kiçan, Meman and Xêrikan tribes and had a population of 1,876 in 2021.

The hamlet of Yetkin is attached to Katran.
