= Bağlarbaşı, Cizre =

Village in Şırnak Province, Turkey

Bağlarbaşı
- Village
- Location within Turkey
- Coordinates: 37.345°N 42.107°E
- Country: Turkey
- Province: Şırnak
- District: Cizre
- Population (2021): 308
- Time zone: UTC+3 (TRT)

Bağlarbaşı (Kurdish: Serdehil) is a village in the Cizre District of Şırnak Province in Turkey. The village is populated by Kurds of the Meman tribe and had a population of 308 in 2021.

The hamlet of Tepe is attached to the village.
