= Korucu, Cizre =

Village in Şırnak Province, Turkey

Korucu
- Village
- Location within Turkey
- Coordinates: 37.237°N 42.068°E
- Country: Turkey
- Province: Şırnak
- District: Cizre
- Population (2021): 1,243
- Time zone: UTC+3 (TRT)

Korucu (Kurdish: Derbacîya) is a village in the Cizre District of Şırnak Province in Turkey. The village is populated by Kurds of the Elîkan and Meman tribes and had a population of 1,243 in 2021.

The hamlet of Karatepe is attached to Korucu.
