= Gürsü, Cizre =

Village in Şırnak Province, Turkey

Gürsü
- Village
- Location within Turkey
- Coordinates: 37.273°N 42.134°E
- Country: Turkey
- Province: Şırnak
- District: Cizre
- Population (2021): 684
- Time zone: UTC+3 (TRT)

Gürsü (Kurdish: Gozik) is a village in the Cizre District of Şırnak Province in Turkey. The village is populated by Kurds of the Amara and Meman tribes and had a population of 684 in 2021.
