= Varlık, Cizre =

Village in Şırnak Province, Turkey

Erdem
- Village
- Location within Turkey
- Coordinates: 37.224°N 42.040°E
- Country: Turkey
- Province: Şırnak
- District: Cizre
- Population (2021): 547
- Time zone: UTC+3 (TRT)

Varlık (Kurdish: Gijal) is a village in the Cizre District of Şırnak Province in Turkey. The village is populated by Kurds of the Elîkan tribe and had a population of 547 in 2021.
