= Koçtepe, Cizre =

Village in Şırnak Province, Turkey

Koçtepe
- Village
- Location within Turkey
- Coordinates: 37.170°N 41.966°E
- Country: Turkey
- Province: Şırnak
- District: Cizre
- Population (2021): 573
- Time zone: UTC+3 (TRT)

Koçtepe (Kurdish: Tirehfêrik) is a village in the Cizre District of Şırnak Province in Turkey. The village is populated by Kurds of the Omerkan tribe and had a population of 573 in 2021.

== History ==
While the village was previously attached to the Nusaybin District in Mardin Province, it became attached to the Cizre District of the same province on 23 October 1929. In 1990, it was attached to the Cizre District of the newly established Şırnak Province.
