= Çatalçeşme, Demirözü =

Çatalçeşme
- Village
- Location within Turkey
- Coordinates: 40.2100°N 39.8862°E
- Country: Turkey
- Province: Bayburt
- District: Demirözü
- Population (2021): 97
- Time zone: UTC+3 (TRT)

Çatalçeşme is a village in the Demirözü District, Bayburt Province, Turkey. Its population is 97 (2021).

== History ==
The former name of the village was Yukarı Hınzaverek.
