= Çimentepe, Demirözü =

Çimentepe
- Village
- Location within Turkey
- Coordinates: 40°06′N 39°42′E
- Country: Turkey
- Province: Bayburt
- District: Demirözü
- Population (2021): 29
- Time zone: UTC+3 (TRT)

Çimentepe is a village in the Demirözü District, Bayburt Province, Turkey. Its population is 29 (2021).

== History ==
The former name of the village was Kütüdü.
