= Demirözü District =

District of Bayburt Province, Turkey

- District
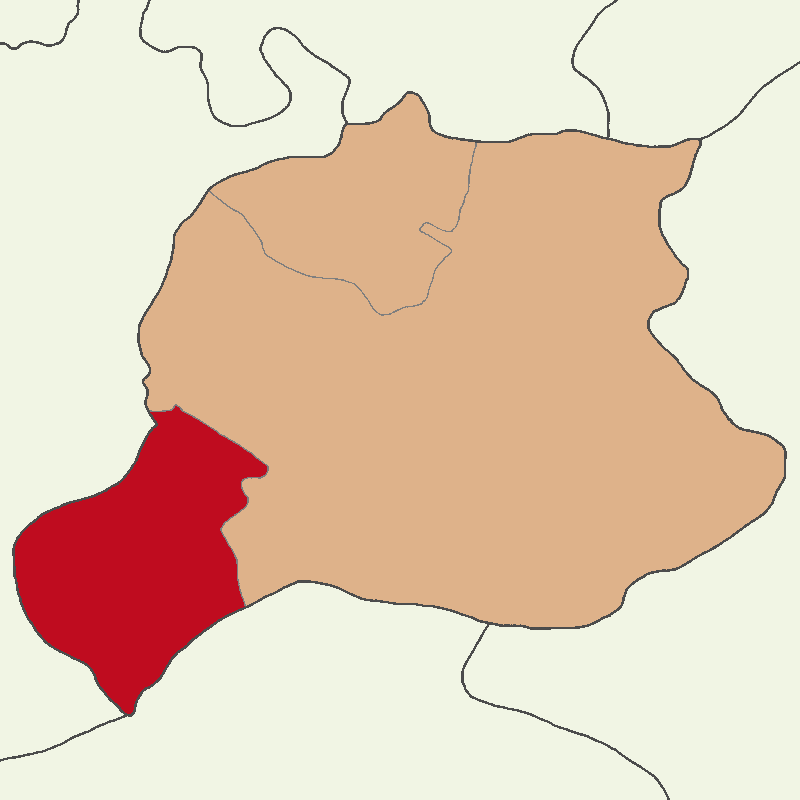
- Map showing Demirözü District in Bayburt Province

- Location in Turkey
- Coordinates: 40°05′N 39°49′E
- Country: Turkey
- Province: Bayburt
- Seat: Demirözü

Government
  - Kaymakam: Ali Ekber Ateş
- Area: 594 km^{2} (229 sq mi)
- Population (2021): 8,531
  - Density: 14.4/km^{2} (37.2/sq mi)
- Time zone: UTC+3 (TRT)
- Website: www.demirozu.gov.tr

Demirözü District is a district of Bayburt Province of Turkey. Its seat is the town Demirözü. Its area is 594 km^{2}, and its population is 8,531 (2021).

== Composition ==
There are two municipalities in Demirözü District:

- Demirözü
- Gökçedere

There are 26 villages in Demirözü District:

- Akyaka
- Bayrampaşa
- Beşpınar
- Çağıllı
- Çakırözü
- Çatalçeşme
- Çimentepe
- Damlıca
- Devetaşı
- Dikmetaş
- Elmalı
- Eymür
- Güçlü
- Güvercindere
- Işıkova
- Kalecik
- Karayaşmak
- Kavaklı
- Otlukbeli
- Petekli
- Pınarcık
- Serenli
- Yakupabdal
- Yazıbaşı
- Yelpınar
- Yukarıpınarlı
