= Otlukbeli, Demirözü =

Otlukbeli
- Village
- Location within Turkey
- Country: Turkey
- Province: Bayburt
- District: Demirözü
- Population (2021): 22
- Time zone: UTC+3 (TRT)

Otlukbeli is a village in the Demirözü District, Bayburt Province, Turkey. Its population is 22 (2021).
