= Erdem, Cizre =

Village in Şırnak Province, Turkey

Erdem
- Village
- Location within Turkey
- Coordinates: 37.213°N 42.081°E
- Country: Turkey
- Province: Şırnak
- District: Cizre
- Population (2021): 162
- Time zone: UTC+3 (TRT)

Erdem (Kurdish: Dimbilîya) is a village in the Cizre District of Şırnak Province in Turkey. The village is populated by Kurds of the Meman tribe and had a population of 162 in 2021.
