= Çatalköy, Cizre =

Village in Şırnak Province, Turkey

Çatalköy
- Village
- Location within Turkey
- Coordinates: 37.347°N 42.170°E
- Country: Turkey
- Province: Şırnak
- District: Cizre
- Population (2021): 204
- Time zone: UTC+3 (TRT)

Çatalköy (Kurdish: Sitevrik) is a village in the Cizre District of Şırnak Province in Turkey. The village is populated by Kurds of the Kiçan and Meman tribes and had a population of 204 in 2021.
