= Beşpınar =

Beşpınar (literally "five springs" in Turkish) may refer to the following places in Turkey:

- Beşpınar, Beşiri, a village in the district of Beşiri, Batman Province
- Beşpınar, Çınar
- Beşpınar, Demirözü, a small town in the district of Demirözü, Bayburt Province
- Beşpınar, Kovancılar
- Beşpınar, Vezirköprü, a village in the district of Vezirköprü, Samsun Province
