= Yazıbaşı, Demirözü =

Yazıbaşı
- Village
- Location within Turkey
- Coordinates: 40.0637°N 39.8774°E
- Country: Turkey
- Province: Bayburt
- District: Demirözü
- Population (2021): 127
- Time zone: UTC+3 (TRT)

Yazıbaşı is a village in the Demirözü District, Bayburt Province, Turkey. Its population is 127 (2021).

== History ==
The former name of the village was Aşağı Lori.
