= Çakırözü, Demirözü =

Çakırözü
- Village
- Location within Turkey
- Coordinates: 40.1997°N 39.8736°E
- Country: Turkey
- Province: Bayburt
- District: Demirözü
- Population (2021): 95
- Time zone: UTC+3 (TRT)

Çakırözü is a village in the Demirözü District, Bayburt Province, Turkey. Its population is 95 (2021).

== History ==
The old name of the village is Cebre. In the Ottoman census of 1530, the settlement appears as a village under the name Cebre of Bayburd district. In the census of 1591, 18 people, all of whom were Muslims, lived in the village. There was an active mill in the village at that time. In the avarız register of 1642, there were 4 households in the village consisting solely of Muslims, 1 soldier and 1 religious official, subject to avarız tax. In the Ottoman records of 1835, only the male population is included, and 45 men lived in 14 households consisting solely of Muslims. There was also a mill in the settlement. In 1845, the number of households in the village was 19.

== Geography ==
The village is 33 km away from Bayburt city center and 5 km away from Demirözü town center.
