= Serenli, Demirözü =

Serenli
- Village
- Location within Turkey
- Coordinates: 40.0257°N 39.7633°E
- Country: Turkey
- Province: Bayburt
- District: Demirözü
- Population (2021): 107
- Time zone: UTC+3 (TRT)

Serenli is a village in the Demirözü District, Bayburt Province, Turkey. Its population is 107 (2021).

== History ==
The former name of the village was Pekesi.
