= Uğur, Cizre =

Village in Şırnak Province, Turkey

Uğur
- Village
- Location within Turkey
- Coordinates: 37.183°N 41.949°E
- Country: Turkey
- Province: Şırnak
- District: Cizre
- Population (2021): 207
- Time zone: UTC+3 (TRT)

Uğur (Kurdish: Tilebêr; Syriac: Tlībel) (Note: Alternatively transliterated as Telibel, Telle-Bal, Tellibel, Tilbel, Tilibel, or Tel-Bal.) is a village in the Cizre District of Şırnak Province in Turkey. The village is populated by Kurds of the Aluwa tribe and had a population of 207 in 2021.

== History ==
Tlībel (today called Uğur) was historically inhabited by Syriac Orthodox Christians. In the Syriac Orthodox patriarchal register of dues of 1870, it was recorded that the village had 20 households, who did not pay any dues, and it did not have a church or a priest. It was located in the Cizre kaza in the Mardin sanjak in the Diyarbekir vilayet in c. 1900. In 1914, the village was populated by 300 Syriacs, according to the list presented to the Paris Peace Conference by the Assyro-Chaldean delegation. There were 50 Syriac Orthodox families who belonged to the diocese of Jezire. Amidst the Sayfo, only two people survived the onslaught as they had been hidden by their Kurdish servants. The village was subsequently seized by Kurds.

== Bibliography ==
- Baz, Ibrahim (2016). Şırnak aşiretleri ve kültürü (in Turkish). ISBN 9786058849631.
- Bcheiry, Iskandar (2009). The Syriac Orthodox Patriarchal Register of Dues of 1870: An Unpublished Historical Document from the Late Ottoman Period. Gorgias Press.
- Gaunt, David (2006). Massacres, Resistance, Protectors: Muslim-Christian Relations in Eastern Anatolia during World War I. Gorgias Press.
- Jongerden, Joost; Verheij, Jelle, eds. (2012). Social Relations in Ottoman Diyarbekir, 1870-1915. Brill.
