= Ulaş, Cizre =

Village in Şırnak Province, Turkey

Ulaş
- Village
- Location within Turkey
- Coordinates: 37.360°N 42.119°E
- Country: Turkey
- Province: Şırnak
- District: Cizre
- Population (2021): 542
- Time zone: UTC+3 (TRT)

Ulaş (Kurdish: Zêvîk) is a village in the Cizre District of Şırnak Province in Turkey. The village is populated by Kurds of the Kiçan and Meman tribes and had a population of 542 in 2021.
