= Tepeönü, Cizre =

Village in Şırnak Province, Turkey

Tepeönü
- Village
- Location within Turkey
- Coordinates: 37.315°N 42.086°E
- Country: Turkey
- Province: Şırnak
- District: Cizre
- Population (2021): 471
- Time zone: UTC+3 (TRT)

Tepeönü (Kurdish: Batil) is a village in the Cizre District of Şırnak Province in Turkey. The village is populated by Kurds of the Meman tribe and had a population of 471 in 2021.
