= Damlıca, Demirözü =

Damlıca
- Village
- Location within Turkey
- Coordinates: 39.9785°N 39.7816°E
- Country: Turkey
- Province: Bayburt
- District: Demirözü
- Population (2021): 119
- Time zone: UTC+3 (TRT)

Damlıca is a village in the Demirözü District, Bayburt Province, Turkey. Its population is 119 (2021).

== History ==
The former name of the village was Gülelihayık.
