= Assyrian–Kurdish clashes (1895–1900) =

1895–1900 clashes

Assyrian–Kurdish Clashes (1895–1900)
- Part of Assyrian–Kurdish conflict
Date	1895–1900
Location	Hakkari region, Ottoman Empire (notably Çölemerik, Dize, Peyanis and Livin)

Belligerents
Assyrian Tribes (sometimes called nestorians)	(Kurdistan Region) Kurdish Tribes; Ottoman Empire

Commanders and leaders
Malik Yosip; Malik Ismail II; Malik Khoshaba (joined in 1900)	(Kurdistan Region) Rashid Beg (Kurdistan Region) Local Kurdish Tribal Leaders

Strength
5,000+ (In 1896)	Unknown

The Assyrian-Kurdish Clashes (1895-1900) were clashes between the Assyrians and Kurds, during the Hamidian massacres (until 1897, when the massacres were stopped) and became more serious after the Kurds took 400 sheep from the Assyrians and killed two shepherds in 1896.

== Background ==
In the late 19th century, the Ottoman Empire witnessed a rise in sectarian and ethnic tensions, especially in the eastern regions with a majority of Kurds and Christians. These tensions reached their peak during the Hamidian Massacres between 1894 and 1896, which primarily targeted Armenians but also affected Assyrians, Chaldeans, and Syriacs, particularly in the Diyarbakir province. In October and November 1895, the Diyarbakir massacres took place, where thousands of Christians were killed, and many villages and churches were destroyed and looted. These massacres left a deep impact on the Christian communities, which began to see themselves as threatened with extinction. Amidst this chaos, armed Kurdish tribes with direct or indirect support from the Ottoman authorities began to attack Assyrian village properties and steal their livestock, leading to violent reactions from some Assyrian groups, particularly the Tyari in the Çölemerik region, who engaged in armed conflicts between 1895 and 1897.

== 1895–1897 events ==
In 1895, Assyrian Drove Away Ottoman Tax Collectors From Their Region, And in 1897, The Assyrians Confronted An Ottoman Battalion attempting to Enter the Region, Causing the Battalion To Withdraw.

== 1896 clashes ==
In 1896, members of the Kurdish Artuşi Tribe, located in a plateau near the Çölemerik area, seized 400 sheep belonging to the Tyari Nestorians (Assyrians were Wrongfully called Nestorians) and assaulted two shepherds. In response, the Nestorians mobilized and attacked the Kurdish area known as Livin, engaging in looting and pllaging. Authorities tried to restore order without causing further incidents by deploying soldiers to the region. In the same year, five thousand armed Tyari Nestorians in Çölemerik raided and looted the village of Dize, located six hours away from Çölemerik, and later attacked Peyanis village, killing many residents and besieging the local military unit, which called for reinforcements.

== 1899 Clashes ==
In late December 1899, Malik Ismail II led a force of 600 Tyari Assyrians under his command in a series of raids and the plundering of several Muslim Kurdish villages in the Levin Valley, carried out as an act of vengeance.
