= Kalecik, Demirözü =

Kalecik
- Village
- Location within Turkey
- Coordinates: 39.9845°N 39.8149°E
- Country: Turkey
- Province: Bayburt
- District: Demirözü
- Population (2021): 341
- Time zone: UTC+3 (TRT)

Kalecik is a village in the Demirözü District, Bayburt Province, Turkey. Its population is 341 (2021).

== History ==
The former name of the village was Yukarı Hayik.
