= Cizre District =

District in Şırnak Province, Turkey

- District
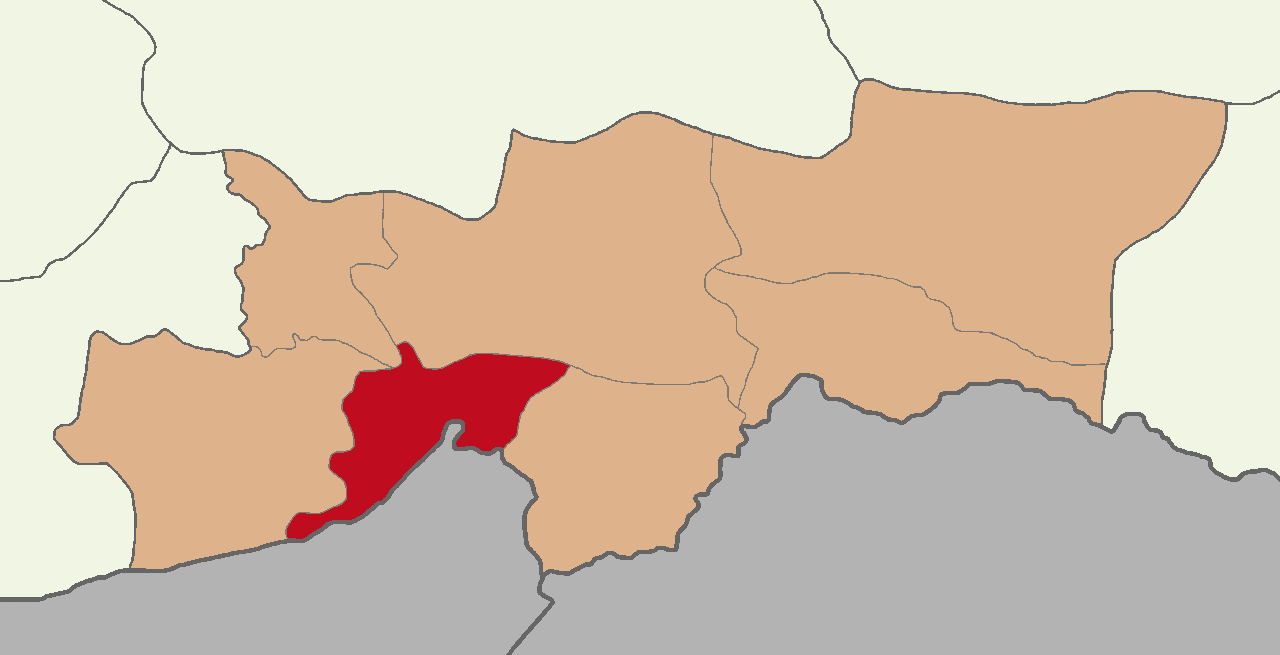
- Map showing Cizre District in Şırnak Province

- Location in Turkey
- Coordinates: 37°18′N 42°07′E
- Country: Turkey
- Province: Şırnak
- Seat: Cizre
- Area: 444 km^{2} (171 sq mi)
- Population (2022): 159,754
  - Density: 360/km^{2} (930/sq mi)
- Time zone: UTC+3 (TRT)

Cizre District is a district of the Şırnak Province of Turkey. Its population was 159,754 in 2022. Its area is 444 km^{2}. The seat of the district is the town of Cizre.

== Settlements ==
Cizre District contains no beldes, thirty-two villages, of which one is unpopulated, and nineteen hamlets.

=== Cities ===
1. Cizre

=== Villages ===
1. Aşağıçeşme (Bîr Yakup)
2. Aşağıdere (Dêra jêr)
3. Aşağıkonak (Eywan)
4. Bağlarbaşı (Serdehil)
5. Bozalan (Behmor)
6. Çağıl (Sirsirk)
7. Çatalköy (Sitevrik)
8. Çavuşköy (Ernebat)
9. Dirsekli (Baska)
10. Düzova (Hoser)
11. Erdem (Dimbilîya)
12. Grikova
13. Güçlü (Cibrî)
14. Gürsü (Gozik)
15. Havuzlu (Birkê)
16. Katran (Bazift)
17. Kayaköy (Pêlisî)
18. Kebeli (Babil)
19. Keruh (Karox)
20. Kocapınar (Emerin)
21. Koçtepe (Tirehfêrik)
22. Korucu (Derbacîya)
23. Kurtuluş (Basisk)
24. Kuştepe (Mûsîrê)
25. Seyrantepe (Bilinda Darê)
26. Sulak (Nêrhib)
27. Taşhöyük (Girgevir)
28. Tepeönü (Batil)
29. Uğur (Tilêber)
30. Ulaş (Zêvîl)
31. Varlık (Gijal)
32. Yakacık (Fêrîsî)
33. Yalıntepe (Bêdar)
34. Yeşilyurt (Cinibrî)

== Population ==
Historical population
Year	Pop.	±% p.a.
1985	44,732	—
1990	63,626	+7.30%
1997	74,852	+2.35%
2007	105,651	+3.51%
2012	124,804	+3.39%
2017	140,372	+2.38%
2022	159,754	+2.62%
Source: Population censuses (1985-1997) and TÜIK (2007-2022)
