= Güvercindere, Demirözü =

Güvercindere
- Village
- Location within Turkey
- Coordinates: 40°07′N 39°53′E
- Country: Turkey
- Province: Bayburt
- District: Demirözü
- Population (2021): 11
- Time zone: UTC+3 (TRT)

Güvercindere is a village in the Demirözü District, Bayburt Province, Turkey. Its population is 11 (2021).

== History ==
The former name of the village was Aşutka.
