= Yelpınar, Demirözü =

Yelpınar
- Village
- Location within Turkey
- Coordinates: 40°11′N 40°00′E
- Country: Turkey
- Province: Bayburt
- District: Demirözü
- Population (2021): 58
- Time zone: UTC+3 (TRT)

Yelpınar is a village in the Demirözü District, Bayburt Province, Turkey. Its population is 58 (2021).

== History ==
The former name of the village was Püllürek.
