= Kebeli, Cizre =

Village in Şırnak Province, Turkey

Kebeli
- Village
- Location within Turkey
- Coordinates: 37.187°N 42.027°E
- Country: Turkey
- Province: Şırnak
- District: Cizre
- Population (2021): 328
- Time zone: UTC+3 (TRT)

Kebeli (Kurdish: Babil) is a village in the Cizre District of Şırnak Province in Turkey. The village is populated by Kurds of the Omerkan tribe and had a population of 328 in 2021.

== History ==
=== The "Babylonian" myth ===
According to Turkish sources, local oral tradition and folklore the village is allegedly the very first capital of the first Babylonian state. A proof of many historians that pushed forward this theory was the stele found in the area, as well as the ancient ruins beneath the village.

However, this theory can be disproven by factual evidence, such as the stele not being Babylonian at all, but Neo-Assyrian, most likely being erected during the very first western campaigns of Assurnasirpal II. The first capital of Babylon civilization was Babylon.

The name "Babil" is likely a folk toponym, preserved locally into Ottoman and early Turkish times.
