= Yukarıpınarlı, Demirözü =

Yukarıpınarlı
- Village
- Location within Turkey
- Coordinates: 40°09′N 39°58′E
- Country: Turkey
- Province: Bayburt
- District: Demirözü
- Population (2021): 31
- Time zone: UTC+3 (TRT)

Yukarıpınarlı is a village in the Demirözü District, Bayburt Province, Turkey. Its population is 31 (2021).
