= Sulak, Cizre =

Village in Şırnak Province, Turkey

Sulak
- Village
- Location within Turkey
- Coordinates: 37.295°N 42.134°E
- Country: Turkey
- Province: Şırnak
- District: Cizre
- Population (2021): 734
- Time zone: UTC+3 (TRT)

Sulak (Kurdish: Nêrhib) is a village in the Cizre District of Şırnak Province in Turkey. The village is populated by Kurds of the Amara tribe and had a population of 734 in 2021.
