= Beşpınar, Demirözü =

Beşpınar
- Village
- Location within Turkey
- Coordinates: 40.0385°N 39.8539°E
- Country: Turkey
- Province: Bayburt
- District: Demirözü
- Population (2021): 308
- Time zone: UTC+3 (TRT)

Beşpınar is a village in the Demirözü District, Bayburt Province, Turkey. Its population is 308 (2021). Before the 2013 reorganisation, it was a town (belde).

== History ==
The former name of the village was Yukarı Lori.
