= Havuzlu, Cizre =

Village in Şırnak Province, Turkey

Havuzlu
- Village
- Location within Turkey
- Coordinates: 37.336°N 42.279°E
- Country: Turkey
- Province: Şırnak
- District: Cizre
- Population (2021): 665
- Time zone: UTC+3 (TRT)

Havuzlu (Kurdish: Birkê) is a village in the Cizre District of Şırnak Province in Turkey. The village is populated by Kurds of the Tayan tribe and had a population of 665 in 2021.
