= Güçlü, Cizre =

Village in Şırnak Province, Turkey

Güçlü
- Village
- Location within Turkey
- Coordinates: 37.276°N 42.100°E
- Country: Turkey
- Province: Şırnak
- District: Cizre
- Population (2021): 1,093
- Time zone: UTC+3 (TRT)

Güçlü (Kurdish: Cibrî) is a village in the Cizre District of Şırnak Province in Turkey. The village is populated by Kurds of the Amara and Meman tribes and had a population of 1,093 in 2021.

The two hamlets of Kolgezer and Sarıtarla are attached to Güçlü.
