= Kurtuluş, Cizre =

Village in Şırnak Province, Turkey

Kurtuluş
- Village
- Location within Turkey
- Coordinates: 37.359°N 42.161°E
- Country: Turkey
- Province: Şırnak
- District: Cizre
- Population (2021): 1,019
- Time zone: UTC+3 (TRT)

Kurtuluş (Kurdish: Mûsîrê) is a village in the Cizre District of Şırnak Province in Turkey. The village is populated by Kurds of the Botikan tribe and had a population of 1,019 in 2021.
