= Sargon Gabriel discography =

Discography of Assyrian musician Sargon Gabriel

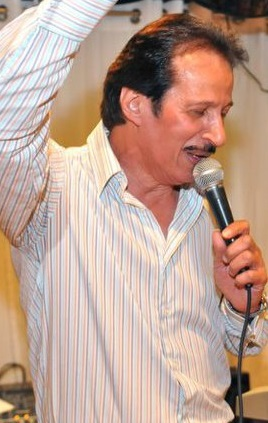
- Studio albums: 22
- Extended plays: 1
- Live albums: 2
- Compilation albums: 1
- Singles: 2

Sargon Gabriel (Syriac: ܣܪܓܘܢ ܓܒܪܐܝܠ) is an Assyrian musician born in Habbaniyah, Iraq, whose music style usually involves traditional Assyrian folk music with the instruments, zurna and dawoola. Since the start of his career in the 1970s, Gabriel has released more than 20 albums, as well as collaborated on others. His latest album is from 2012, titled Shoryen Zmara, some of his notable writers of his songs include Adwar Mousa.

== Albums ==
=== Studio albums ===
Atouraya (1976)

- Producer: Sargon Gabriel
- Backing Band: East Bird
- Musicians:
  - Tony Abraham: Drums and Bass Guitar
  - Freddie De Eiel: Guitars
  - Eddie Talya: Organ, Piano

No.	Title	Length
1.	"Atouraya"	3:50
2.	"Seida d-Ghazala [Version 1]"	4:05
3.	"Ya Teira"	6:38
4.	"Shmeemon Ya Jwanqeh"	4:38
5.	"Shuprakh Najib"	4:38
6.	"Mooroonla Raqda"	4:59
7.	"Souria"	3:17
8.	"Sharin Bizmara"	6:24

Nineveh (1978)
No.	Title	Length
1.	"Nineveh [Version 1]"	4:23
2.	"Zmoorri b-aw Qala Khilya"	4:20
3.	"Khoubba Meira [Talakh Kleeti Version 1]"	5:06
4.	"Prishla Khleeti Minni"	5:00
5.	"Oymo Zardeh"	6:24
6.	"Takhmoonewin"	4:26
7.	"Benissaneh"	4:44
8.	"Gameechi La Tri Gamiyyokh"	4:18

Shlama Athuraya (1980)

- Producer: Sargon N. Yonan
- Music Arranged and Played by: Heart Beat Band
- Musicians:
  - Joseph Yackob: Drums and Bangos
  - Ashoor Baba: Lead, Rhythm Guitar and Bazouki
  - Shlimon Khamo: Bass Guitar
  - Andy Taroyan: Keyboard

No.	Title	Writer(s)	Music	Length
1.	"Shlama Athuraya"	David Ismial	Sargon Gabriel	2:51
2.	"Tura d Nareh"	Assyrian Folk	Assyrian Folk	4:08
3.	"Kishmishi"	Ramzi Balou	Assyrian Folk	3:13
4.	"Shapira"	Assyrian Folk	Assyrian Folk	3:39
5.	"Le Manshinnakh"	Fabroniya Al-Dahawe	Sargon Gabriel	7:08
6.	"Shamiran"	Youshia Gewargis	Sargon Gabriel	3:25
7.	"Shaikhani"	Assyrian Folk	Assyrian Folk	5:32
8.	"Yousipco"	Assyrian Folk	Assyrian Folk	3:24

Dalaleh (1981)
No.	Title	Writer(s)	Music	Length
1.	"Khanna Khanna"	Assyrian Folk	Assyrian Folk	3:00
2.	"Khubba Marira" (featuring Linda George)	Ramzi Balou	Sargon Gabriel	4:43
3.	"Sayda d Ghazala"	George Shanko	George Shanko	4:24
4.	"Zari Zari"	Odette George	Assyrian Folk	4:20
5.	"Dalale" (featuring Linda George)	Assyrian Folk	Linda George	6:40
6.	"Perdesa"	Shimon Barkho	Sargon Gabriel	5:22
7.	"Zabnana d Saleh"	Assyrian Folk	Assyrian Folk	3:56

Ganta D'Perdeisa (1982)

- Music Arranged and Played by: Duklit Band
- Musicians:
  - William Nissan: Lead Guitar
  - Allen George: Bass Guitar
  - Joseph : Keyboards
  - Edward Sliwo: Drums
  - Johnson Babella: Saxophone
  - Freddy DeEil: Lead Guitar

No.	Title	Writer(s)	Music	Length
1.	"Ganta D'Perdeisa"	Barchan Khouri	Sargon Gabriel	8:54
2.	"Brata d'Mam Oshana"	Hikmet Hermiz Shabo	Hikmet Hermiz Shabo	4:21
3.	"Khooba D'Soroota"	Anwar Hawel	Yousif	3:56
4.	"Brata Ninwata"	Sargon Gabriel	Sargon Gabriel	4:56
5.	"Reesh d'Khigga"	Ramzi Balou	Sargon Gabriel	4:26
6.	"La Bay'yinnakh"	Sargon Gabriel	Sargon Gabriel	6:02
7.	"Zabnana d Saleh"	Zorna Dawoola	Bat Band	3:44

Khooyada D'Omta (1983)

- Music Arranged by: Tiglat Issabey
- Produced by: Sargon Yonan
- Engineered by: Fred Britberd
- Assisted by: Robert Noghli and Paul
- Musicians:
  - Tiglat Issabey: Piano
  - William Nissan: Guitar
  - Allan George: Bass
  - Edward Sliwo: Drums
  - Alaiho: Percussion
  - Lloyd King: Flute
  - Wayne Wisniewski: Trumpet
  - John Demos: French Horn
  - Sargon Yonan: Oud, Synthesizer, Qanoon
  - Erni & Assembly: Strings

No.	Title	Writer(s)	Music	Length
1.	"Khooyada D'Omta"	Nashat Yonan		3:18
2.	"Shara"	George Shanko		3:45
3.	"Kha Sama Min Khobakh"	Nashat Yonan		7:12
4.	"Yala Yala Brata"	Ramzi Balou		3:46
5.	"Bayina Bayina"	Emmanuel Solomon	Sargon Yonan	4:43
6.	"Hawa d'Tooraneh"	George Shanko	George Shanko	4:34
7.	"Go Aynathakh Tasheelee"	Emmanuel Solomon	Emmanuel Solomon	4:43
8.	"Janwinna"	Shamon Barkho	Sargon Gabriel	4:05

Parzona (1984)

- Arranged by: Robert Noghli & Ashoor Baba
- Engineered by: Glen Odagawa
- Mixed by: Glen Odagawa and Robert Noghli
- Musicians:
  - Robert Noghli : Drums, Percussions, Simmons Drums
  - Ashoor Baba : Guitars, Orchestron and Synthesizer
  - Tony Brown and Brian Surina : Bass
  - Chris Cameron : Memory Moog and Yamaha DX7
  - Kraig McCreary : Acoustic and Electric Guitars
  - Jim Stynoff : Clarinet
  - Steve Eisen : Flute and Soprano Sax

No.	Title	Writer(s)	Music	Length
1.	"Parzona"	Assyrian Folk	Assyrian Folk	4:11
2.	"Katwana d'Shereh"	Nashat Yonan	Sargon Gabriel	4:51
3.	"Kheeza d'Yama"	Emmanuel Solomon	Emmanuel Solomon	4:33
4.	"Moorri"	Nashat Yonan	Sargon Gabriel	3:02
5.	"Libby W Libbo"	Nashat Yonan	Sargon Gabriel	3:54
6.	"Tolama"	Nashat Yonan	Sargon Gabriel	3:31
7.	"Prashtakh"	Esho Lazar	George Hana	5:42
8.	"Platta Al Margeh"	Akhteyar Benamen	Sargon Gabriel	2:59

Sara (1985)

No.	Title	Writer(s)	Music	Length
1.	"Sara" (featuring Julie Yousif)	Yatron Darmo	Sargon Gabriel	4:52
2.	"Luiza Khanim"	Ziya Khanim	Sargon Gabriel	6:01
3.	"Ayno Kumeh"	Youshia Gewargis	Sargon Gabriel	5:30
4.	"La Jarbat Brata"	Kimbal Bakoo	Sargon Gabriel	4:01
5.	"Bispara"	Anwar Hawel	Sargon Gabriel	4:49
6.	"Karta"	Shimon Barkho	Shimon Barkho	4:02
7.	"Nsuli Ilana"	Nashat Yonan	Sargon Gabriel	6:16
8.	"Yimma"	Shimon Barkho	Sargon Gabriel	8:28

Way Way Minnakh (1987)

No.	Title	Writer(s)	Music	Length
1.	"Wy Wy Minnakh"	Edwar Mousa	Edwar Mousa	4:56
2.	"Solteh"	Nashat Yonan	Assyrian Folk	4:19
3.	"Asmar Asmar" (cover song)	Albert Ruel Tamras	Assyrian Folk	5:06
4.	"Nazeh"	Sargon Gabriel	Ibrahim Tatlises	4:30
5.	"Sli Alli Mitra"	Sargon Gabriel	Sargon Gabriel	4:17
6.	"Yala Yala Brata"	Nashat Yonan	Sargon Gabriel	5:11
7.	"Le Manshinnakh"	Hermiz Hassamo	Sargon Gabriel	4:44
8.	"Resha d'Sheta"	Esho Warda	Sargon Gabriel	3:59

Dalleh (1989)

No.	Title	Writer(s)	Music	Length
1.	"Dalleh"	Shimon Barkho	Shimon Barkho	4:29
2.	"Ghazali"	Shimon Barkho	Assyrian Folk	3:27
3.	"La Qre Qati"	Ramzi Balou	Sargon Gabriel	6:03
4.	"Shera"	George Zomaya	Sargon Gabriel	4:45
5.	"Bigrasela"	Ewan Gewargis	W. Shlimon	5:26
6.	"Nareh"	Assyrian Folk	Sargon Gabriel	5:00
7.	"Neqda"	Shmouel	Assyrian Folk	3:55
8.	"Kalo O'Khitna"	Sargon Gabriel	Sargon Gabriel	3:42

Lishana d'Yimma (1991)

No.	Title	Writer(s)	Music	Length
1.	"Lishana d'Yimma"	Atalla Gewargis	Yousif Esho	4:08
2.	"Mkomane L Amediya"	Daddeh Esho	Daddeh Esho	4:00
3.	"Arpa Khetwateh"	Oshana Mirza	Oshana Mirza	5:31
4.	"Talakh Khliti"	Sargon Levi	Farid Al-Atrash	5:09
5.	"Susa d Nura"	Atalla Gewargis	Yousif Esho	4:33
6.	"Nahrain"	Atalla Gewargis	Yousif Esho	4:47
7.	"Layla"	Rekhana Abrahim	Sargon Gabriel	3:19
8.	"Talakh Khliti" (instrumental)		Farid Al-Atrash	5:09

Kertey (1992)

- Music arranged by: Eshaya Nano
- Album cover by: Edward Gabriel
- Recorded & produced by:Eshaya Nano in Sydney, Australia
- Musicians:
  - Romeo Nano: Piano
  - Moneer Benjamin: Bass Guitar
  - Danny Nano: Drums & Percussion
  - Johnny Brikho: Solo Synthesizer
  - Eshaya Nano: Keyboards & Guitar

No.	Title	Writer(s)	Music	Length
1.	"Siqly Al Resha d'Toora"	Edwar Musa	Edwar Musa	4:40
2.	"Maney E Dzemra"	Edwar Musa	Shabeh Lawendo	3:37
3.	"Brata d'Ashour"	John Homeh	John Homeh	5:27
4.	"Bessa Sapar"	Edwar Musa	Edwar Musa	5:57
5.	"Kertey"	Peter Sana	Peter Sana	5:03
6.	"Nareeneh"	Edwar Musa	Edwar Musa	5:01
7.	"Rikidla Mya Meeney"	Edwar Musa	Edwar Musa	3:21
8.	"Dakhy Massin Mensheyinnakh"	Youkhanna Hnaroo	Youkhanna Hnaroo	6:11

Nineveh V2 (1994)

- Recorded & produced by:Eshaya Nano in Sydney, Australia
- Musicians:
  - Eshaya Nano: Keyboards & Guitar
  - Ben Al Bazi (Fudi): Solo Keyboards
  - Danny Nano: Drums & Percussion
  - Linkin Gewargis: Bass
  - Romeo Nano: Piano

No.	Title	Writer(s)	Music	Length
1.	"Nineveh (Version 2)"	Akhtier	Akhtier	5:54
2.	"Matenee"	Edwar Mousa	Assyrian Folk	4:36
3.	"Khoshabi"	Wilson Daoud	Assyrian Folk	5:20
4.	"Nasheh D'Matwate"	Rekhana	Rekhana	5:27
5.	"Yasmin"	Edwar Mousa	Edwar Mousa	4:15
6.	"Khleete"	Petar Sana	Petar Sana	4:25
7.	"Brata d'Omty"	A. & George Homeh	A. & George Homeh	4:35
8.	"Khoobakh Sabrana"	Sargon Levi	Fareed Al-Atrash	5:57

Shooshla (1996)

- Music arranged by: Noel Mando (except "Rawaya" and "Erzala")
- Music played and programmed by: William Nissan
- Music tracked and mixed by: Eshaya Nano at Studio 46 in Sydney, Australia
- Musicians:
  - William Nisan: Rhythm section and backgrounds
  - Phillip Khammou:Lead Synthesizer
  - Rasson Bet Younan: Piano

No.	Title	Writer(s)	Music	Length
1.	"Shooshla"	Warda Khamis	John Dashto	4:17
2.	"Brata d'Mami"	Youseph Daniel	Youseph Daniel	4:20
3.	"Lawin Beydaya"	Nashat Younan	John Dashto	4:57
4.	"Kalow"	Goriel Shimoon	Sargon Gabriel	3:50
5.	"Kinara"	Nabel Mamoo	Nabel Mamoo	4:13
6.	"Rawaya"	Gabriel Gewargis	Sargon Gabriel	4:12
7.	"Orkha d'Etkhayae"	Bismark Shlemon	Bismark Shlemon	4:51
8.	"Erzala"	Wilson Esho	Sargon Gabriel	2:57

Darwid (1997)

- Music arranged & programmed by: William Nissan
- Music mixed by: William Nissan and Melis Eshay
- Leads Synth by: Odi Khoury
- Percussion by: Amer H.
- Background Vocals: Ramsen Sheeno
- "Darwid" arranged and played by: Gilbert Hanna & Phillip Khamo

No.	Title	Writer(s)	Music	Length
1.	"Khela d'Khoubba"	Aprim Yousifi	Sargon Gabriel	6:02
2.	"Darwid"	S.H. Barkou	S.H. Barkou	4:55
3.	"Yonee"	Rekhana Abraham	Sargon Gabriel	3:55
4.	"Wardee"	A. Shamdanani	A. Shamdanani	2:48
5.	"Bayat Shoqatli"	Macksud Eshaia	Macksud Eshaia	4:19
6.	"Shoushanneh"	Rekhana Abraham	Rekhana Abraham	4:42
7.	"Ya Libbee"	A. Shamdanani	A. Shamdanani	6:05
8.	"Shouprakh"	S.H. Barkou	S.H. Barkou	3:20

The Legend Continues (2002)

- Music arranged & programmed by: Samir Daniel
- Recorded and mixed at PLD Studio
- Cover design by: Freddy Gabriel
- Musicians:
  - Samir Daniel: Guitar, Keyboard, Percussion
  - Ashur Silwo: Drums
  - James Mirza: Drums
  - Moneer Benjamen: Bass
  - Nabeel Khamo: Piano & Additional Keyboards
  - Joseph Youkhana: Additional Keyboards

No.	Title	Writer(s)	Music	Length
1.	"Khuyada Aturaya"	Dawid Bet Malikh	Sargon Gabriel	5:50
2.	"Zaia"	Dawid Barkho	Dawid Barkho	4:27
3.	"Taklit Yata"	Aprim Bet Yousip	John Dastho	4:06
4.	"Shoq Koleh Shamee"	Yousip Menashi	Yousip Menashi	4:52
5.	"Prashta d'Orkhateh"	Macksud Eshaia	Nashwan	3:48
6.	"Shooshla Yalikhtakh"	Afram Zendo	Sargon Gabriel	4:31
7.	"Prashtakh Mennee"	Aprem Bet Yousip	Shemon Menashi	4:33
8.	"Jooleh d'Khoomaleh"	Zia Sada	Nawfal	3:34

Perdaisa (2004)

- Music on Tracks 1, 4, 5, 6, 7 arranged by: William Nissan (USA)
- Music on Tracks 2 & 3 arranged by: Samir Daniel (Australia)
- Tracks 1,4,5,6 recorded by Bassim Zahdan at BZ Studios
- Track 7 recorded by: Melis Eshaya at MS Studios
- Tracks 2,3 recorded by: Samir Daniel
- Musicians:
  - Murad Taiym: Keyboards
  - Douglas Issac: Bass Guitar
  - Rami & Liz: Violins

No.	Title	Writer(s)	Music	Length
1.	"Perdaisa"	Shimon Barkho	Sargon Gabriel	5:32
2.	"Ayella D'Biyali"	Dawid Barkho	Dawid Barkho	3:10
3.	"Marali"	Dawid Barkho	Dawid Barkho	4:30
4.	"Tashish"	Dawid Barkho	Dawid Barkho	4:35
5.	"Bulbulli"	Zaia Shlimon	Sargon Gabriel	4:14
6.	"Hakkari"	Melis Eshaya	Assyrian Folk	5:54
7.	"Sargon"	Melis Eshaya	Assyrian Folk	3:34

Al Balee (2006)

- Arranged by: Ramiel Band
- Produced by: Francis Bijou
- Recorded and Mixed at Ashur Esho Recording Studio in Chicago, IL
- Musicians:
  - Joseph Youkhanna: Guitars
  - Francis Bijou: Bass
  - George Awraha: Keyboards
  - Robert Youmaran: Drums & Percussion
- Guest Musicians:
  - Laith Yousif: Oud
  - Rami Yosif: Violin & Viola
  - Kostas Sotiroupolos: Bouzouki
  - Firas Hermis: Latin Perc
  - Robert Artinian: Clarinet
  - Edward Hanna: Tabla
  - Sebo: Ethnic Drums
  - Ashiq: Zurna
  - Naiyif: Nay
  - Kinan: Cello
- Background Vocals
  - Joan Dawoud
  - Ramsin Sheeno
  - Joseph Youkhanna
  - John Mirza
  - Francis Bijou

No.	Title	Writer(s)	Music	Length
1.	"Bout Khatirrit Ainakh"	Shimon Barkho	Assyrian Folk	7:39
2.	"Chikko"	Dawod Barkho	Dawod Barkho	5:23
3.	"Dereh O Komaneh"	Melis Eshaya	Melis Eshaya	4:27
4.	"Al Balee"	George Dinkha	Joseph Youkhanna	5:41
5.	"Hakkari"	Melis Eshaya	Francis Bijou	6:22
6.	"Barkho"	Dawod Barkho	Dawod Barkho	4:10
7.	"Chirtehla"	Oc Joe	Dawod Barkho	3:20
8.	"Gashaqta L'Shouprakh"	Nashat Yonan	John Dashto	7:02
9.	"Dakhi Prikhloukh"	Zaia Shlimon	Sargon Gabriel	5:45
10.	"Goushiqly"	Youkhanna Hanaro	Joseph Youkhanna	5:02
11.	"Shapirta Yoni" (sung by Freddy Gabriel)	Youkhanna Hanaro	John Dashto	3:56

Bassy Bassy (2010)

- Music arranged by: Ramiel Band
- Tracks 6 & 8 arranged by: Wael Keyboard
- Recorded & Mixed by: Ashur Isho
- Tracks 1,2,5,6,8,9 recorded by: Rennie Daniel, Australia
- Musicians:
  - Ramsin Youkhana: Keyboards
  - Ashur Isho: Acoustic Guitar
  - Rami Yousif: Violin
  - Francis Bijou: Bass
  - Edmon Louis: Percussion

No.	Title	Writer(s)	Music	Length
1.	"Bassy Bassy"	Youkhanna Hanaro	John Dashto	3:54
2.	"Youliah"	George Dinkha	John Dashto	4:19
3.	"Basah Sapar"	Edwar Mousa	Edwar Mousa	4:54
4.	"Dalaleh"	Sargon Rasho	Sargon Rasho	4:18
5.	"Habbaniya"	Esho Adam	Francis Bijou	3:50
6.	"Zmorun Zmorun"	Samir Younan	Amir Younan	4:23
7.	"Malookh Mineh"	William	William	4:23
8.	"Sarsink"	Dawoud Barkho	Dawoud Barkho	4:02
9.	"Ryashin"	Yousip	Assyrian Folk	3:47

Shoryen Zmara (2012)

- All music played and arranged by: Nono Barkho
- Mixing and mastering by: Dani Shomoon at Dan Studios in Toronto, Canada

No.	Title	Writer(s)	Music	Length
1.	"Shoryen Zmara"	Dawod Barkho	Dawod Barkho	4:02
2.	"Marmena"	Dawod Barkho	Dawod Barkho	4:34
3.	"Mdo Youma"	Dawod Barkho	Dawod Barkho	5:38
4.	"Youma Goura"	Dawod Barkho	Dawod Barkho	4:26
5.	"Bayeneh Zimra"	Dawod Barkho	Dawod Barkho	4:17
6.	"Leepen Minakh"	Dawod Barkho	Dawod Barkho	5:18
7.	"Khamtela"	Dawod Barkho	Dawod Barkho	4:16
8.	"Ta Manshenakh"	Dawod Barkho	Dawod Barkho	4:12

=== Live albums ===
Live In Sydney (2004)

Disc 1:

No.	Title	Length
1.	"Zaia"
2.	"Dora"
3.	"Yala Yala Brata"
4.	"Louzia Khanim"
5.	"Mateni"
6.	"Karta"
7.	"Dalleh"
8.	"Brata d'Mami"
9.	"Nasheh d'Matwateh"
10.	"Siqli Al Resha d'Toora"
11.	"Toora d'Nareeh"
12.	"Jooleh d'Khoomala"
13.	"Minnakh b'Torin l'Perdeisa"

Disc 2:

No.	Title	Length
1.	"Brata d'Mami"
2.	"Nasheh d'Matwateh"
3.	"Siqli Al Resha d'Toora"
4.	"Toora d'Nareeh"
5.	"Jooleh d'Khoomala"
6.	"Lewin Bedaya"
7.	"Khela d'Khouba"
8.	"Qoorbakh Bayin"
9.	"Prashtakh"
10.	"Prastha d'Urkhateh"
11.	"Toora d'Hakkari"
12.	"Mooroonla Raqda"
13.	"Bagiyyeh"

=== Compilation albums ===
The Best of Sargon Gabriel (1998)

No.	Title	Length
1.	"Bayina Bayina"	4:43
2.	"Shara"	3:45
3.	"Parzona"	4:15
4.	"Kartah"	4:06
5.	"Ayno Koumeh"	5:24
6.	"Naree"	5:03
7.	"Brata d'Mami"	4:30
8.	"Brata d'Mam Oshana"	4:33
9.	"Yala Yala Brata"	3:46
10.	"Khela d'Khouba"	6:08
11.	"Lewin Bedaya"	5:09
12.	"Go Ayenatakh"	4:43
13.	"Nsouli Ilanah"	3:42
14.	"Prashtakh"	5:50
15.	"La Qrae Qati"	3:57
16.	"Ganta d'Perdaisa"	2:59

== EPs ==
Yimma Yimma (1973)
No.	Title	Music	Length
1.	"Ktawakh Kharaya"	Esho Younadom	3:14
2.	"Yimma Yimma"	Barsham Khoury	2:39
3.	"Atoureta Min Dimey"	The Eastbirds	2:04
4.	"Nishra d'Atour"	Shlimon; The Eastbirds	3:10

== Singles ==
Title	Release	Album
"Prashta d'Khoba" "Dokha"	1998	Tune of Great Singers
"Min Nineveh Hal Khabur"	2015	

== Other appearances ==
=== Guest appearances ===
Year	Album	Artist
1986	Taliboota (Melodies from North of My Country)	Linda George
1996	Shenie Wara	Lazar Malko
2001	Qa Mani Bayat (Away)	Walter Aziz
2009	Sayyadeh	Albert Mansour
2009	Pletly D Khazenakh	Suaad Elias
