= Çavuşköy, Cizre =

Village in Şırnak Province, Turkey

Çavuşköy
- Village
- Location within Turkey
- Coordinates: 37.284°N 42.152°E
- Country: Turkey
- Province: Şırnak
- District: Cizre
- Population (2021): 1,178
- Time zone: UTC+3 (TRT)

Çavuşköy (Kurdish: Ernebat) (Note: Also known as Arnabad, Ernabat, or Fraabat.) is a village in the Cizre District of Şırnak Province in Turkey. The village is populated by Kurds of the Amara and Meman tribes and had a population of 1,178 in 2021.

== History ==
Arnabad (today called Çavuşköy) was historically inhabited by Armenians and Syriac Orthodox Christians. It was located in the Cizre kaza in the Mardin sanjak in the Diyarbekir vilayet in c. 1900. It is tentatively identified with the village of Der Babat, which was populated by 350 Syriacs in 1914, according to the list presented to the Paris Peace Conference by the Assyro-Chaldean delegation.

== Bibliography ==
- Baz, Ibrahim (2016). Şırnak aşiretleri ve kültürü (in Turkish). ISBN 9786058849631.
- Gaunt, David (2006). Massacres, Resistance, Protectors: Muslim-Christian Relations in Eastern Anatolia during World War I. Gorgias Press.
- Jongerden, Joost; Verheij, Jelle, eds. (2012). Social Relations in Ottoman Diyarbekir, 1870-1915. Brill.
