= Güçlü, Demirözü =

Güçlü
- Village
- Location within Turkey
- Coordinates: 40.1015°N 39.9145°E
- Country: Turkey
- Province: Bayburt
- District: Demirözü
- Population (2021): 38
- Time zone: UTC+3 (TRT)

Güçlü is a village in the Demirözü District, Bayburt Province, Turkey. Its population is 38 (2021).
