= Kocapınar, Cizre =

Village in Şırnak Province, Turkey

Kocapınar
- Village
- Location within Turkey
- Coordinates: 37.294°N 42.065°E
- Country: Turkey
- Province: Şırnak
- District: Cizre
- Population (2021): 806
- Time zone: UTC+3 (TRT)

Kocapınar (Kurdish: Emerîn; Syriac: ʿAmīrīn) (Note: Alternatively transliterated as ʿAmrīn, Amrine, ‘Emerin, or Ömerin.) is a village in the Cizre District of Şırnak Province in Turkey. The village is populated by Kurds of the Amara and Meman tribes and had a population of 806 in 2021.

== History ==
‘Amīrīn (today called Kocapınar) was historically inhabited by adherents of the Church of the East. The priest and monk Gīwārgīs of ‘Amīrīn is attested at the Monastery of Mār Aḥḥā the Egyptian in 1540. In the Syriac Orthodox patriarchal register of dues of 1870, it was recorded that the village had 17 households, who paid 30 dues, and it did not have a church or a priest. Malkū, son of Shamʿūn, was ordained as diyāqūs (servant of the church) for the Church of Saint Shmūnī at ‘Amīrīn in January 1914 by Metropolitan Yuliyus Bihnām of Jazireh. In 1914, it was inhabited by 300 Syriacs, according to the list presented to the Paris Peace Conference by the Assyro-Chaldean delegation. There were 250 Syriac Orthodox Christians and some Chaldean Catholic families. Amidst the Sayfo, on 1 June 1915, most of the Syriacs were taken and killed by the Kurds of the Esene, Mammi, and ‘Alikan tribes. Fifteen families were able to escape under the protection of the Kurdish sheikh ‘Abde from Batelle, who escorted them to Azekh. The village was subsequently seized by Kurds.

== Bibliography ==
- Baz, Ibrahim (2016). Şırnak aşiretleri ve kültürü (in Turkish). ISBN 9786058849631.
- Bcheiry, Iskandar (2009). The Syriac Orthodox Patriarchal Register of Dues of 1870: An Unpublished Historical Document from the Late Ottoman Period. Gorgias Press.
- Bcheiry, Iskandar (2019). "Digitizing and Schematizing the Archival Material from the Late Ottoman Period Found in the Monastery of al-Zaʿfarān in Southeast Turkey" (PDF). Atla Summary of Proceedings. 72 (January): 50–61. doi:10.31046/proceedings.2018.113.
- Bcheiry, Iskandar (2023). "A Syriac Orthodox List of Diyāqūs (Servants of the Church) from the Late Ottoman Period" (PDF). The International Journal of Levant Studies. 5: 25–74.
- Courtois, Sébastien de (2004). The Forgotten Genocide: Eastern Christians, The Last Arameans. Translated by Vincent Aurora. Gorgias Press.
- Gaunt, David (2006). Massacres, Resistance, Protectors: Muslim-Christian Relations in Eastern Anatolia during World War I. Gorgias Press.
- Jongerden, Joost; Verheij, Jelle, eds. (2012). Social Relations in Ottoman Diyarbekir, 1870-1915. Brill.
- Wilmshurst, David (2000). The Ecclesiastical Organisation of the Church of the East, 1318–1913 (PDF). Peeters Publishers.
