= Dayrabun =

- Village
- Location in Iraq Dayrabun (Iraqi Kurdistan)
- Coordinates: 37°5′3″N 42°25′42″E
- Country: Iraq
- Region: Kurdistan Region
- Governorate: Dohuk Governorate
- District: Zakho District
- Sub-district: Rizgari

Population (2010)
  - Total: 4,241

Dayrabun (Note: Alternatively transliterated as Derabin, Derabon, Derabun, Deirabūn, or Deir Abuna.) (Arabic: ديربون, Kurdish: دێره‌بوون, romanized: Dêrebûn) is a village in Dohuk Governorate in Kurdistan Region, Iraq. It is located near the confluence of the Iraq-Syria-Turkey border in the Zakho District. It is inhabited by Yazidis.

In the village, there is a Chaldean Catholic church of the Sacred Heart of Jesus, which was constructed in 1934–1937, and renovated in 2005–2007.

== Etymology ==
The name of the village is derived from "dayra" ("monastery" in Syriac) and "abuna" ("father" in Syriac), and thus Dayrabun translates to "monastery of the father".

== History ==
A monastery, from which the village takes its name, was likely constructed in the 11th or 12th century, and persisted into the 13th and 14th centuries, but is no longer extant. According to local tradition, the monastery was dedicated to Noah. Dayrabun and its church are attested in a manuscript commissioned in 1671. The village's population were adherents of the Church of the East until converted to Chaldean Catholicism in the 19th century, likely simultaneously with the conversion of the neighbouring town of Faysh Khabur. After the Assyrian genocide in the First World War, Assyrians from the villages of Mansoriyya, Umra, and Barahanji in the vicinity of Cizre in Turkey found refuge and settled at Dayrabun.

In late July 1933, a number of armed Assyrians crossed over the river Tigris into Syria near the village, and two battalions of Iraqi infantry, two squadrons of cavalry, and one section of artillery were stationed at Dayrabun to intercept them on their return to Iraq. On 4 August, the Assyrians re-entered Iraq and the ensuing skirmish resulted in a disputed number of casualties and became the catalyst of the Simele massacre, whereby roughly 40 Assyrian villages were destroyed or looted by the Iraqi army. The Iraqi army aimed to destroy Dayrabun, but was spared after the intervention of the Chaldean Catholic Patriarch Yousef VI Emmanuel II Thomas.

The village was largely destroyed by fire in 1936, and was rebuilt in its current location in the early 1940s, at which time Assyrian refugees from Russia settled at Dayrabun. The population grew from 536 in the 1947 census, to 657 in the census of 1957. The village was mostly inhabited by Assyrians until their forced expulsion by the Iraqi government and replacement by Arabs and Yazidis in 1976 as part of its policy of Arabisation. The Arabs fled amidst the 1991 uprisings in Iraq, and Kurds settled in the village in their place. Sectarian attacks on Assyrians in Baghdad, Mosul, and the Nineveh Plains in the 2000s spurred their return to Dayrabun, which was rebuilt in 2005 to accommodate the returnees. In 2006, the Kurdistan Regional Government (KRG) encouraged Kurdish families to leave Dayrabun with the incentive of financial compensation, according to then KRG Minister of Human Rights Mohammed Ihsan. In early 2009, 466 displaced Assyrians, with 133 families, resided in Dayrabun. By 2011, the Hezel Foundation had constructed 150 houses and a hall, renovated the church, and developed the village's infrastructure. In 2012, Dayrabun was inhabited by 635 Chaldean Catholics, and by February 2018, 80 Chaldean Catholic families were recorded there.

== See also ==
- Assyrians in Iraq
- Yazidis in Iraq

== Bibliography ==
- Awde, Nicholas; Lamassu, Nineb; Al-Jeloo, Nicholas (2007). Aramaic (Assyrian/Syriac) Dictionary & Phrasebook. Hippocrene Books.
- Donabed, Sargon George (2015). Reforging a Forgotten History: Iraq and the Assyrians in the Twentieth Century. Edinburgh University Press.
- Eshoo, Majed (2004). The Fate Of Assyrian Villages Annexed To Today's Dohuk Governorate In Iraq And The Conditions In These Villages Following The Establishment Of The Iraqi State In 1921 (PDF). Translated by Mary Challita.
- Oehring, Otmar (2017). Christians and Yazidis in Iraq: Current Situation and Prospects. Konrad Adenauer Foundation.
- Salt, Jeremy (2008). The Unmaking of the Middle East: A History of Western Disorder in Arab Lands. University of California Press.
- Wilmshurst, David (2000). The Ecclesiastical Organisation of the Church of the East, 1318–1913. Peeters Publishers.
