= Güçlü =

Güçlü is a Turkish surname. Notable people with the surname include:

- Ayhan Güçlü (born 1990), Turkish football forward
- Dilaver Güçlü (born 1986), Turkish football midfielder
- Mehmet Güçlü (born 1952), Turkish wrestler
- Roza Güclü Hedin (born 1982), Swedish politician
- Sami Güçlü (born 1950), Turkish politician
