= Al-Tahira Syriac Catholic Church =

Catholic church in Qaraqosh, Iraq

- Church of the Immaculate Conception
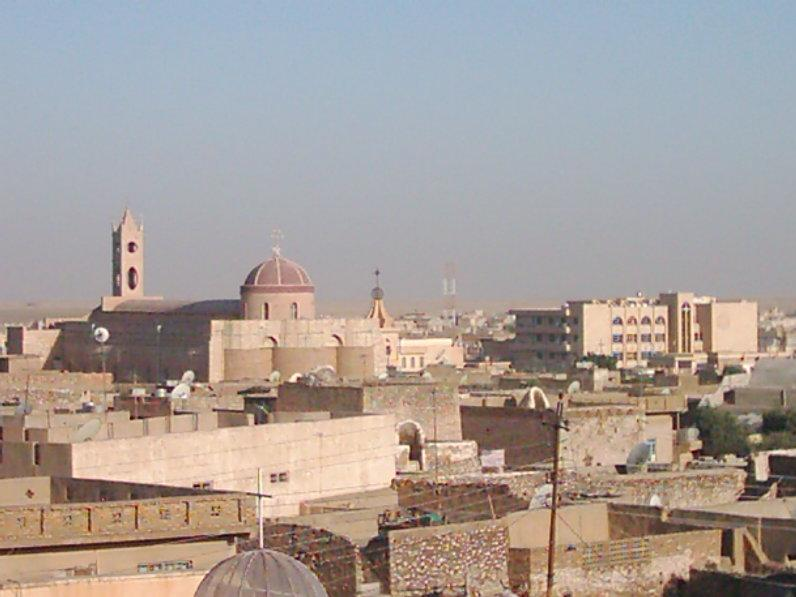
- The church pictured in 2009
- Al-Tahira Syriac Catholic Church
- 36°16′13.74″N 43°22′37.62″E
- Location: Qaraqosh, Nineveh Governorate
- Country: Iraq
- Denomination: Roman Catholic

History
- Status: Active
- Founded: 1862
- Dedication: Our Lady of the Immaculate Conception

Architecture
- Architectural type: Church
- Years built: 1859–1862; 1932–1948; 2020–2025
- Completed: 1 September 2025; 10 months ago

The Al-Tahira Syriac Catholic Church, also known as the Church of the Immaculate Conception, is a Syriac Catholic church located in the city of Qaraqosh, Iraq, 32 km (20 mi) southeast of Mosul. Originally opened in 1948, the church was largely destroyed by the Islamic State during their invasion of the city in 2014, with what remained being turned into a makeshift shooting range. After the city's liberation in 2016, reconstruction efforts began on the church. Pope Francis notably visited church during its reconstruction on his visit to Iraq in 2021. The church officially reopened on 1 September 2025 in a ceremony attended by the Iraqi Prime Minister Mohammed Shia' al-Sudani.

== Overview ==
The church is most often referred to dually as both the Al-Tahira Syriac Catholic Church and the Church of the Immaculate Conception, but due to differences in translation to English, has also been referred by varying media as the Al-Tahera Church, St Mary al-Tahira church, the Church of Our Lady of the Immaculate Conception, and the Immaculate Conception Church.

The church is located in the predominantly Christian city of Qaraqosh, known as Bakhdida in Aramaic, and is located 32 km (20 mi) southeast of Mosul. Due to the much larger size of Mosul, the church has occasionally been misreported to be in this city.

== History ==
The church was originally constructed in 1859 and opened in 1862, but was significantly added to between 1932 and 1948, opening sometime in the latter as the largest church in the city.

When the city of Qaraqosh was invaded in 2014 by the Islamic State, much of the Christian population of the city was killed or fled. Likewise, in August 2014, the church was largely destroyed and burned, with the remains of the church being turned into a makeshift shooting range. After the city's liberation between 2016–17 as part of the larger Battle of Mosul, early reconstruction efforts began for both rebuilding the church and returning the native Christian population to the city. Reconstruction officially began on 13 February 2020, with the effort led by an Italian-supervised team of UNESCO workers funded by the United Arab Emirates and European Union, in cooperation with the Nineveh Antiquities and Heritage Inspectorate. On 7 March 2021, Pope Francis visited the church during its reconstruction while on his visit to Iraq, meeting fellow Christians inside and commenting on the resilience of a statue of Mary, mother of Jesus, which had survived the church's previous destruction. On 2 May 2024, Archbishop of the Syriac Catholic Archeparchy of Mosul, Emmanuel Kalo, announced the church had reached its final stages of reconstruction and was about 90% complete. On 1 September 2025, the reconstruction of the church was completed and was reopened to the public in a ceremony attended by several government officials including the Iraqi Prime Minister Mohammed Shia' al-Sudani. After speeches by the Prime Minister and the Syriac Catholic Patriarch of Mosul, Younan Hano, the Prime Minister further planted olive trees in the church's courtyard as a symbol of peace.

== See also ==
- Roman Catholicism in Iraq
