= Çimenli, Hakkâri =

Village in Hakkari Province, Turkey

Çimenli
- Village
- Location within Turkey
- Coordinates: 37.486°N 43.627°E
- Country: Turkey
- Province: Hakkâri
- District: Hakkâri
- Population (2023): 334
- Time zone: UTC+3 (TRT)

Çimenli (Kurdish: Çemîbedel, Syriac: Chamba d'Bet Elīyā, Chambā d-Beth Elīyā) is a village in the central district of Hakkâri Province in Turkey. The village is populated by Kurds of the Pinyanişî tribe and had a population of 334 in 2023.

== History ==
The village was populated by 6 Assyrian families in 1850, while no families were recorded in 1877.

== Population ==
Population history from 1997 to 2023:

Population
Year	Pop.	±%
1997	276	—
2007	337	+22.1%
2012	356	+5.6%
2017	322	−9.6%
2022	322	+0.0%
2023	334	+3.7%
