= Albayrak =

Albayrak is a Turkish surname. Notable people with the surname include:

- Berat Albayrak, Turkish businessman
- Emir Batur Albayrak (born 2007), Turkish Olympian swimmer
- Erhan Albayrak, Turkish footballer
- Eren Albayrak, Turkish footballer
- Hakan Albayrak, Turkish journalis
- Naz Albayrak (born 2007), Turkish female tennis player
- Nebahat Albayrak, Turkish-Dutch politician
- Sinan Albayrak, Turkish actor
- Tayfun Rıdvan Albayrak, Turkish footballer
- Tuğçe Albayrak (1991–2014), German-Turkish victim of violence, see Death of Tuğçe Albayrak
- Uğur Albayrak, Turkish footballer

== See also ==
- Albayrak, Çüngüş
