= List of massacres during the Greco-Turkish War (1919–1922) =

List of massacres of the Greco-Turkish War that lasted from 1919 to 1922

The Greco-Turkish War (1919–1922) was a series of military conflicts between the Greeks and the Turks which occurred after World War I when the Greeks attempted to expand their territory into eastern Thrace and the district of Smyrna. These territories were given to Greeks as part of the Treaty of Sèvres with the dissolution of the Ottoman Empire, but was rejected by nationalist Turks leading to the war and a series of bloody massacres committed by both sides.

| Name | Date | Location | Deaths | Responsible Party | Victims | Notes |
|---|---|---|---|---|---|---|
| Greek landing at Smyrna | 15–16 May 1919 | Smyrna | 400–500 killed | Greeks, Turks | Turks, Greeks | The orderly landing of the Greek army soon turned into a riot against the local Turkish population by local Greeks and Greek soldiers. Stores and houses were looted, many cases of beatings, rape, killing. Estimates for killed and wounded Greeks are 100, for Turks between 300 and 400. Further 4000 Turks were killed during Greek occupation in Smyrna, excluding these events and Menemen Massacre. McCarthy claims that 640,000 Turks were killed by Greeks in occupation areas between Greek landing at Smyrna and Turkish capture of Smyrna however his work has faced harsh criticism by many scholars who have characterized McCarthy's views as biased towards Turkey and defending Turkish atrocities against Armenians as well as genocide denial. |
| Menemen massacre | 16–17 June 1919 | Menemen | 100–200 | Greeks | Turks | 200 killed, 200 injured |
| Massacre at Erbeyli | 22 June 1919 | Erbeyli and the surrounding area | 72 | Greeks | Turks | Greek soldiers abducted and executed 72 Turkish civilians from Erbeyli, Germencik and İncirliova as a reprisal to the previous raid by Turkish irregulars (Kuva-yi Milliye) on Greek soldiers. |
| Battle of Aydın | 27 June–4 July 1919 | Aydın | 2,700–3,500 | Turks and Greeks | Turks and Greeks | The Greek army occupied the city which was later taken by Turkish irregulars and then again by the Greeks. These developments resulted in the destruction of most of the city and massacres from both sides. Killed Greeks were estimated as 1,500–2,000, Turks as 1,200–1,500. |
| İzmit massacres | March 1920 –June 1921 | Ortaköy, Geyve, Akhisar, İznik, İzmit district | 12,000 | Turkish irregulars and Turkish nationalist army | Greeks | An Allied report (in June 1921) stated that 12,000 Greeks were massacred and 30 villages destroyed. |
| Yalova Peninsula massacres | 1920–1921 | Gemlik/Yalova Peninsula | estimates vary: 5,500–9,100 | Greeks troops, local Greeks, Armenians and Circassians | Turks | The perpetrators were Greek troops and local Greek and Armenian gangs, who burned down Orhangazi, Yenişehir, Armutlu. In total 27 villages were razed and their population fled. In Armutlu women were methodically raped. Circassians participated also in the events. According to statements gathered by Ottoman officials from the Muslim refugees at the Davut Paşa camp, in total, 35 were reported to have been killed, wounded, beaten, or missing, per the questionnaire submitted by a group of 177 refugees reporting on their family members. |
| Bilecik massacre | March–April 1921 | Bilecik, Sögüt, Bozüyük | 208 | Greeks troops, local Greeks | Turks | The town of Bilecik and crops were burned down by the retreating Greek army, local people were massacred. Bilecik, Sögüt, Bozüyük and dozens of neighboring villages were burned or plundered by the hastily retreating Greek army, their haste limited the destruction. |
| Samsun deportations | May–November 1921 | Samsun | 21,000 deported, c. 10,000 dead. | Turkish irregulars and Turkish nationalist army | Greeks | Central Army under Nureddin Pasha and irregulars under Topal Osman forced the Greeks of Samsun to Death Marches. |
| Çamköy massacre | 15 May 1921 | Çamköy, Germencik | 120 | Greek Army | Turks | Burned alive in a mosque. |
| Gördes and Akça massacre | 21 May 1921 | Gördes, Manisa | 33 | Greek Army | Turks | The city was the first one to be burned by the Greek army, 33 people were killed, 113 were injured and 42 women and girls were raped. During the fire, 1,500 houses and 10 mosques were destroyed. |
| İzmit massacre | 24 June 1921 | İzmit | 300 | Greek Army | Turks | Up to 300 people, mostly men, were executed by Greek troops. Their bodies were buried in a mass grave outside the town. Arnold J. Toynbee was a reporter who described these events in the Manchester Guardian. |
| Karatepe village massacre | 14 February 1922 | Karatepe | 385 | Greek Army | Turks | In one of the examples of the Greek atrocities during the retreat, on 14 February 1922, in the Turkish village of Karatepe in Aydin Vilayeti, after being surrounded by the Greeks, all the inhabitants were put into the mosque, then the mosque was burned. The few who escaped fire were shot. |
| Germencik massacre | 4-5 September 1922 | Germencik | 94 | Greek Army | Turks | Also known as Kanlıbahçe [literally 'Bloody Garden'] massacre. Three children survived the massacre. |
| Salihli massacre | 5 September 1922 | Salihli | at least 76 | Greek forces | Turks | The city was burned by the retreating Greek army, 65% of the buildings were destroyed. |
| Turgutlu massacre | 4–6 September 1922 | Turgutlu (former Kasaba) | at least 1,000; somewhere between 1,000 and 31,000 | Greek forces | Turks | The city was burned by the retreating Greek army, 90% of the buildings were destroyed. Approximately 1,000 died. Park:"Cassaba (present day Turgutlu) was a town of 40,000 souls, 3,000 of whom were non-Muslims. Of these 37,000 Turks only 6,000 could be accounted for among the living, while 1,000 Turks were known to have been shot or burned to death. Of the 2,000 buildings that constituted the city, only 200 remained standing." |
| Turgutlu massacre | September 1922 | Turgutlu (former Kasaba) | 4,000 | Turks | Greeks | From 8,000 Greek civilians gathered in the town, half of them remained after the evacuation of the Greek Army. They were killed by the advancing Turkish soldiers. As a part of Greek genocide. |
| Uşak massacre | 1 September 1922 | Uşak | 200 | Greeks | Turks | The city was burned by the retreating Greek army, 33% of the buildings were destroyed. |
| Manisa massacre | 6–7 September 1922 | Manisa | 4,355 | Greek troops | Turks | The city was burned by the retreating Greek army. 855 people shootted down by Greek Army and 3,500 people died in flames. Turkish sources are guessing that 300 women were kidnapped to rape. James Loder Park, the U.S. Vice-Consul in Constantinople at the time, who toured much of the devastated area immediately after the Greek evacuation, described the situation, as follows: "Manisa... almost completely wiped out by fire... 10,300 houses, 15 mosques, 2 baths, 2,278 shops, 19 hotels, 26 villas... [destroyed]." |
| Alaşehir massacre | 3–4 September 1922 | Alaşehir | 3,000 | Greeks | Turks | The city was burned by the retreating Greek army. |
| Akhisar massacre | September 1922 | Akhisar | 7,000 | Turkish forces | Greeks | As a result of the capture of the city by the Turkish nationalist army, 7,000 out of the 10,000 strong Greek community of the city was massacred in a nearby gorge. Since then there is no Christian community in the city. |
| Ayvalık massacre | After September 19, 1922 | Ayvalık | 2,977 | Turkish forces | Greeks | Most of the male Greek population, some 3,000, who remained in the town were deported to the interior of Anatolia, of those only 23 survived. The rest of the population was deported to Greece. As a part of Greek genocide. |
| Cunda Island massacre | After September 19, 1922 | Cunda Island | Hundreds | Turkish forces | Greeks | Several hundreds of Greek civilians were killed on the islet of Cunda Island, only some children were spared. As a part of Greek genocide. |
| Massacres before and during the Turkish capture of Smyrna | 8–22 September 1922 | İzmir | "Every morning scores of newly dead bodies appeared" | Turkish gangs and soldiers | Greeks | Further 10,000 to 125,000 Greeks and Armenians died as a result of the Great Fire of Smyrna |

== See also ==
- Outline and timeline of the Greek genocide
- Constantinople pogroms
- Cyprus conflict
- List of massacres in Turkey
- Burning of Smyrna
- List of massacres in Cyprus
