= Geçitköy =

Geçitköy may refer to:

- Geçitköy, Çüngüş
- Geçitköy, Elmalı
- Geçitköy Dam
