= Bayrampaşa S.K. =

Bayrampaşa
- Full name: Bayrampaşa Spor Kulübü
- Nickname: Pasha
- Founded: 1959
- Ground: Çetin Emeç Stadium, Bayrampaşa
- Capacity: 2,300
- Chairman: Erkan Özkaya
- Manager: Tayfun Rıdvan Albayrak
- League: TFF 3. Lig
- 2021–22: TFF 3. Lig, Group 2, 9th
- Website: http://www.bayrampasaspor.com.tr/
Home colours	Away colours	Third colours

Bayrampaşa SK, formerly Bayrampaşaspor, is a Turkish professional football club located in the Bayrampaşa district of Istanbul. They currently play in the TFF Third League, the fourth tier of Turkish football.

== History ==
In 1942 the club was founded as Sağmalcılar Youth Sports Club, in 1959 the name was changed to Bayrampaşa Youth Sports Club. The club has spent the majority of its history in the third division, between 1984 and 1994, before being relegated to the amateur divisions. In 2009, after 16 years, they returned to the fourth tier of Turkish football. Soon after, in May 2012 they beat Hacettepe S.K. by a score of 2–1, thereby being promoted back into the TFF Second League (after being out for 53 years). In the 2012–2013 season, right after promotion, they reached the play-offs, but were eventually knocked out.

== Supporters ==
The fans are referred to as the “Bayrampaşalılar.” The fan movement started in the late 1980s and has been active ever since. As of 2014, the Association of Bayrampaşa Fans participates in charitable activities, such as helping organizations and visiting schools. The fans share a rivalry with Gaziosmanpaşaspor and Eyüpspor.

== Squad ==
Note: Flags indicate national team as defined under FIFA eligibility rules; some limited exceptions apply. Players may hold more than one non-FIFA nationality.

No.	Pos.	Nation	Player
1	GK	TUR	Mesut Balkan
4	DF	AZE	Ege Atlam (captain)
5	MF	TUR	Alicivan Düzova (vice-captain)
6	FW	TUR	Recep Berk Elitez
8	DF	TUR	Cenk Kaplan
9	MF	TUR	Taner Yıldız
12	DF	TUR	Barış Çetin
19	MF	TUR	Oğuzhan Coşkunsever
23	GK	TUR	Ömür Hacısalihoğlu

No.	Pos.	Nation	Player
29	DF	TUR	Ünal Danışıkkaya
32	FW	TUR	Gökhan Kılınç
44	DF	TUR	Oğuzhan Barkın
56	DF	TUR	Mehmet Sait Ulucan
61	DF	TUR	Hüseyin Akmaz
67	MF	AZE	Tuğrul Erat
82	FW	TUR	Can Akgün
—	GK	TUR	Cengizhan Şarli
—	MF	GER	Berkan Afşarlı

== See also ==
- Turkish football league system, overview of football in Turkey
- TFF Second League § Red Group, 2012–2014+
- TFF Third League, 1984–1994 and also 2009–2012
- Amatör Futbol Ligleri, 1994–2009
