= Arpadere =

Arpadere may refer to:

- Arpadere, Çüngüş
- Arpadere, Hamamözü
- Arpadere, Hınıs
- Arpadere, İncirliova
- Arpadere, Pazaryeri
