= Güneydere =

Güneydere can refer to:

- Güneydere, Bayburt
- Güneydere, Çüngüş
