= Eskihisar =

Eskihisar (literally "old fortress" in Turkish) may refer to the following places in Turkey :

- Bolu, capital of the northern province of Bolu, Ancient Claudiopolis (in Honoriade)
- Eskihisar, Denizli, a village in the central (Denizli) district of Denizli Province
- Eskihisar, Elmalı, a village in the district of Elmalı, Antalya Province
- Eskihisar, Nusaybin, a village in the district of Nusaybin, Mardin Province
- Eskihisar, Sultanhisar, a village in the district of Sultanhisar, Aydın Province
- Yeni Eskihisar, a stratigraphic formation in Yatağan, Muğla Province
