= Raid on Erbeyli =

Coordinates: 37°51′N 27°41′E

- Part of the Greco-Turkish War (1919–1922) and Greek genocide
Date	20–21 June 1919
Location	Erbeyli in Aydın Province
Result	Greek victory

Belligerents
(Kingdom of Greece) Greece	Kuva-yi Milliye

Commanders and leaders
Unknown	Lieutenant Kadri Bey

Strength
20 Evzones at the station Reinforcements: 1 Evzones company (200+ soldiers)	70 militias with 1 machine gun

Casualties and losses
30–80 killed and 40 wounded	7 killed and 12 wounded
- 72 civilians massacred by Hellenic Army

The Raid on Erbeyli was a raid conducted by the Kuva-yi Milliye. After invading Aydın and Nazilli, the Greek army was concerned about resistance movements raising in the area. The raid against the Malgaç bridge a few days ago was a good example for their feeling of unease.

== Prelude ==
Turkish Lieutenant Kadri Bey of the Muğla volunteer platoon had been observing Greek troops in the area for several days. He determined their movements, barracks and guard replacement times. After precise surveillance, he concluded that the best target for a raid was the Erbeyli train station. The Erbeyli train station was located 1-2 kilometers away from the Erbeyli village. Therefore, the villagers were far away from gunfires. The train station was guarded by 20 Greek soldiers equipped with machine guns situated in a small hangar next to the station.

== Raid ==
One Evzone company was sent to the Erbeyli village one night before the attack. The Turkish forces, unaware about this circumstance, attacked the train station in the night of 20–21 June 1919. At the beginning, the attacked looked like a success but with the Greek reinforcements arriving from the Erbeyli village the situation got worse. The Greek guards of the station fired with their machine guns from the top floor of the hangar. The clash lasted about three hours. Caught in the fire from two sides and having lost their machine gunner, Kadri Bey decided to retreat under the veil of darkness before the sun would rise. He divided the remaining men into two groups. The first group retreated to the mountainous area in the north, crossing the Büyük Menderes River with the small ship named Osmanbükü and finally arriving in the village of Çakmar. The second group retreated to the plain in the south.

== Result ==
The attack had cost the Turks 7 killed and 12 wounded. The Greeks had suffered 30-80 killed and 40 wounded. The Greek troops angered about the attack and their casualties, brought their casualties to Aydın and showed them to the local Turkish population. Later they abducted 72 Turkish civilians from Erbeyli, Germencik and İncirliova and executed them by shooting as a warning for future raids.

== Sources ==
- History of Erbeyli, Erbeyli village official website (in Turkish)
- BATI ANADOLU’DA KUVAYI MİLLİYENİN OLUŞUMU (1919–1920), Oğuz Gülcan, Ankara Üniversitesi Türk İnkılap Tarihi Enstitüsü, 2007, page 253-254 (Ankara University Open Archive System). (in Turkish)
