= Atalar =

Atalar may refer to:

- Atalar, Çüngüş
- Atalar, Şavşat, village in Artvin Province, Turkey
- Atalar, Tarsus, town in Mersin Province, Turkey
- Atalar, Iran, village in Golestan Province, Iran
- Abdullah Atalar, Turkish scientist and academic
