= Koçören =

Koçören can refer to:

- Koçören, Çüngüş
- Koçören, Defne
