= Hacıyusuflar =

Hacıyusuflar can refer to:

- Hacıyusuflar, Elmalı
- Hacıyusuflar, Yenice
