= Oyuklu =

Oyuklu can refer to:

- Oyuklu, Çüngüş
- Oyuklu, Midyat
