= Yapraklı (disambiguation) =

Yapraklı can refer to:

- Yapraklı
- Yapraklı Dam
- Yapraklı, Elmalı
- Yapraklı, Ergani
- Yapraklı, Fatsa
- Yapraklı, Kahta
