= Deveboynu =

Deveboynu may refer to the following places in Turkey:

- Deveboynu, Beşiri
- Deveboynu, Çüngüş
- Cape Deveboynu, Datça
