= İkizdere (disambiguation) =

İkizdere is a town in Rize Province in the Black Sea region of Turkey.

İkizdere may also refer to the following settlements in Turkey:

- İkizdere District, a district of Rize Province
- İkizdere, Damal, a village in Ardahan Province
- İkizdere, Midyat, a neighbourhood in Mardin Province
- İkizdere, İncirliova, a neighbourhood in Aydın Province
- İkizdere Dam, a dam in Aydın Province
