= Aydınlı =

Aydınlı is a Turkish place name that may refer to the following places in Turkey:

- Aydınlı, Çüngüş
- Aydınlı, Gercüş, a village in the district of Gercüş, Batman Province
- Aydınlı, Vezirköprü, a village in the district of Vezirköprü, Samsun Province
