= Göltarla =

Göltarla may refer to:

- Göltarla, Elmalı, village in the District of Elmalı, Antalya Province, Turkey
- Göltarla, Samsat, village in the District of Samsat, Adıyaman Province, Turkey
