= Akçeşme =

Akçeşme can refer to:

- Akçeşme, Çanakkale
- Akçeşme, İncirliova
- Akçeşme, Keşan
