= Hacımusalar =

Hacımusalar can refer to:

- Hacımusalar, Elmalı
- Hacımusalar, Mudurnu
