= Düdenköy =

Düdenköy can refer to:

- Düdenköy, Elmalı
- Düdenköy, Yeşilova
