= Kaynakköy =

Kaynakköy can refer to:

- Kaynakköy, Çüngüş
- the Turkish name for Sychari
