= Salur, Elmalı =

Salur
- Neighbourhood
- Location in Turkey
- Coordinates: 36.7676°N 29.7942°E
- Country: Turkey
- Province: Antalya
- District: Elmalı
- Population (2022): 729
- Time zone: UTC+3 (TRT)

Salur is a neighbourhood in the municipality and district of Elmalı, Antalya Province, Turkey. Its population is 729 (2022).
