= Elmalı =

- District and municipality
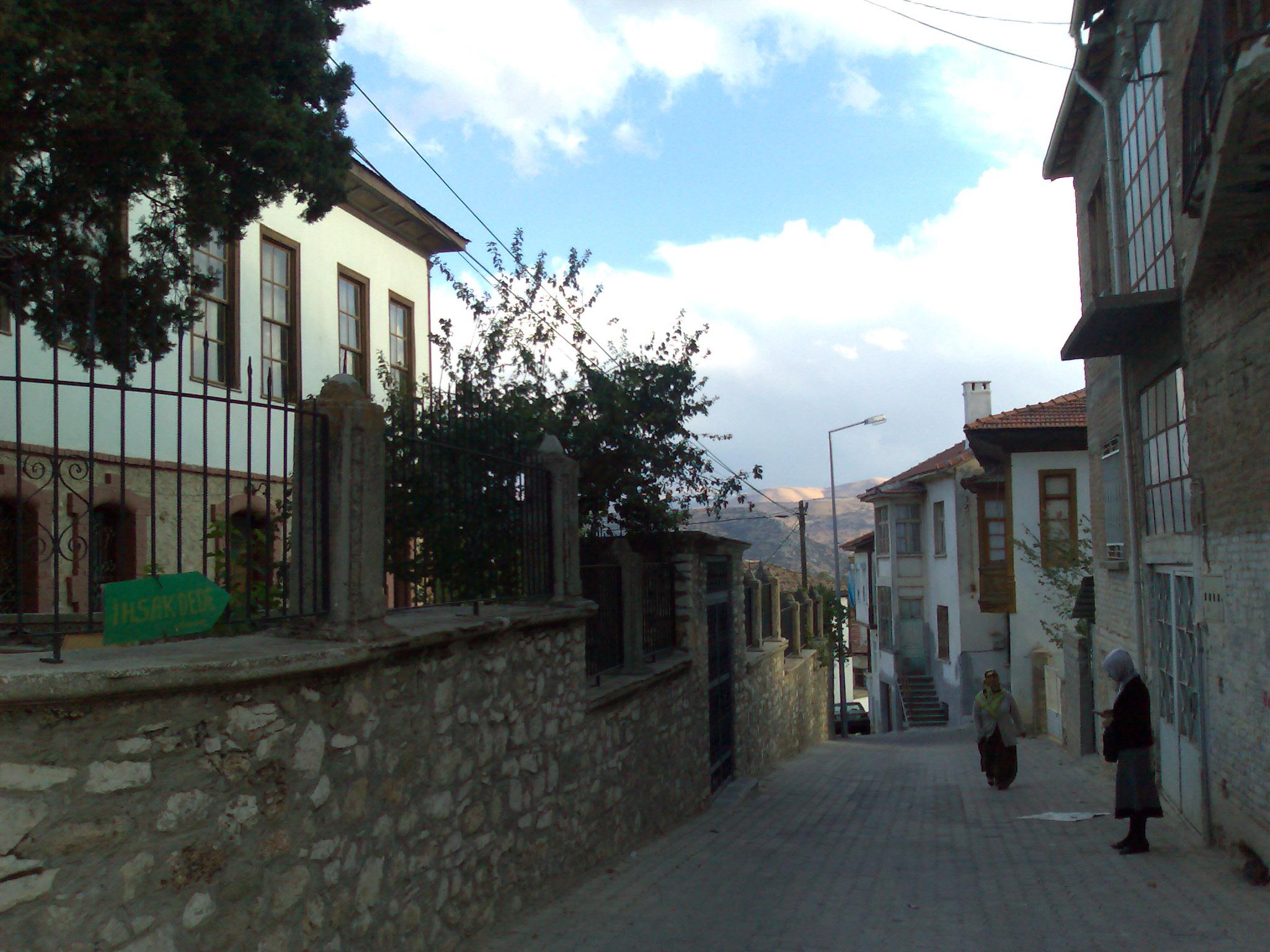
- Historic streets of Elmalı

- Map showing Elmalı District in Antalya Province

- Location within Turkey
- Coordinates: 36°44′N 29°54′E
- Country: Turkey
- Province: Antalya

Government
  - Mayor: Halil Öztürk (CHP)
- Area: 1,433 km^{2} (553 sq mi)
- Elevation: 1,100 m (3,600 ft)
- Population (2022): 40,774
  - Density: 28.45/km^{2} (73.69/sq mi)
- Time zone: UTC+3 (TRT)
- Postal code: 07700
- Area code: 0242
- Website: www.elmali.bel.tr

Elmalı is a municipality and district of Antalya Province, Turkey. It covers an area of 1,433 km^{2}, and as of 2022, its population was 40,774. It lies about 35 km (22 mi) inland, near the town of Korkuteli and 110 km (68 mi) west of the city of Antalya.

Formerly known as Kabalı and Emelas.

== Geography ==
Elmalı is a small plateau at the head of a long upland valley in the Beydağları range of the western Taurus Mountains, surrounded by high peaks including the 2500m Elmalı Mountain. Aside from the town of Elmalı, the district includes two other small towns (Akçay and Yuva) as well as villages. The area is watered by streams running off the mountains. Although close to the Mediterranean, Elmalı is high in the mountains and has an inland climate of cold winters and hot summers, (although still much cooler than the coast). Near Lake Avlan, there is an area of cedar forest, rare in Turkey.

=== Climate ===
Elmalı has a hot-summer Mediterranean climate (Köppen: Csa), with hot, dry summers, and chilly, moderately wet, somewhat snowy winters.

Climate data for Elmalı (1991–2020)
Month	Jan	Feb	Mar	Apr	May	Jun	Jul	Aug	Sep	Oct	Nov	Dec	Year
Mean daily maximum °C (°F)	8.1 (46.6)	10.0 (50.0)	14.1 (57.4)	18.4 (65.1)	23.6 (74.5)	28.7 (83.7)	32.6 (90.7)	32.7 (90.9)	28.7 (83.7)	22.8 (73.0)	15.8 (60.4)	9.9 (49.8)	20.5 (68.9)
Daily mean °C (°F)	2.4 (36.3)	3.8 (38.8)	7.2 (45.0)	11.4 (52.5)	16.2 (61.2)	20.9 (69.6)	24.4 (75.9)	24.3 (75.7)	20.2 (68.4)	14.7 (58.5)	8.6 (47.5)	4.1 (39.4)	13.2 (55.8)
Mean daily minimum °C (°F)	−1.8 (28.8)	−1.0 (30.2)	1.6 (34.9)	5.3 (41.5)	9.5 (49.1)	13.5 (56.3)	16.6 (61.9)	16.7 (62.1)	12.7 (54.9)	8.1 (46.6)	3.1 (37.6)	−0.2 (31.6)	7.0 (44.6)
Average precipitation mm (inches)	79.96 (3.15)	58.6 (2.31)	52.68 (2.07)	35.87 (1.41)	30.33 (1.19)	23.41 (0.92)	10.85 (0.43)	10.78 (0.42)	10.47 (0.41)	34.54 (1.36)	53.86 (2.12)	85.4 (3.36)	486.75 (19.16)
Average precipitation days (≥ 1.0 mm)	7.2	6.6	5.4	5.1	5.4	3.3	2.4	2.6	2.4	3.8	4.8	7.3	56.3
Average relative humidity (%)	72.4	67.1	59.4	55.8	53.2	45.5	38.6	40.8	44.8	55.6	64.3	73.1	55.8
Source: NOAA

== Composition ==
There are 60 neighbourhoods in Elmalı District:

- Afşar
- Ahatlı
- Akçaeniş
- Akçay
- Armutlu
- Bayındır
- Bayralar
- Beyler
- Bozhüyük
- Büyüksöğle
- Camiatik
- Camicedit
- Çaybaşı
- Çobanisa
- Çukurelma
- Dereköy
- Düdenköy
- Eskihisar
- Eymir
- Geçitköy
- Geçmen
- Gökpınar
- Gölova
- Göltarla
- Gümüşyaka
- Gündoğan
- Hacımusalar
- Hacıyusuflar
- İlyağı
- İmircik
- İplikpazarı
- İslamlar
- Kapmescit
- Karaköy
- Karamık
- Karyağdı
- Kışlaköy
- Kızılca
- Kocapınar
- Küçüksöğle
- Kuzköy
- Macun
- Mursal
- Ovacık
- Özdemir
- Pirhasanlar
- Salur
- Sarılar
- Tahtamescit
- Tavullar
- Tekkeköy
- Toklular
- Yakaçiftlikköyü
- Yalnızdam
- Yapraklı
- Yeni
- Yılmazlı
- Yörenler
- Yuva
- Zümrütova

== History ==
Excavations, by Machteld Mellink from Bryn Mawr College, of the burial mounds of Semahöyük and Müren have shown signs of copper production dating back to 2500 BC. The area was later a key town in the north of the antique province of Lycia, and the Lycian Way trade route came through here. It was a small town of Asia Minor in the vilayet of Konia in the Ottoman era, then the administrative centre of the ancient Lycia, but not itself corresponding to any known ancient city. The plain was subsequently controlled by the Ancient Romans, Byzantines, and the Seljuk Turks. The town was the headquarters of Beylik of Teke clan of Anatolian beyliks when it was brought into the Ottoman Empire at the time of Sultan Bayezid I. It remained a key mountain stronghold in the Ottoman period and through the early years of the Turkish republic, but has declined as recent generations have left the dry mountainside for jobs on the coast or in Turkey's major cities.

== Demographics ==
The district has a population of 40,774 (2022). The town itself has 17,591 inhabitants.

== Elections ==
=== 2007 General Elections (Parties with more than %5) ===
Party	Number of Votes	Percentage(%)
AKP	7.880	31,90
CHP	7.686	31,81
MHP	4.576	18,52
DP	3.157	12,78
Turnover	%89,90	

== Elmalı today ==
The district's economy is largely agricultural; 37% of the land is planted. In keeping with its name, (literally apple-town) Elmalı produces 12% of Turkey's apples. Other fruit and vegetables are grown here too, the local leblebi (dried chick peas) is delicious.

Few tourists come to Elmalı although the town is beginning to attract visitors thanks to its rich traditional architecture and beautiful mountain surroundings; these people are either day-trippers or passing through en route to the Mediterranean coast, but do bring important income to the area. Also some residents of the coastal towns such as Finike, Fethiye or Kaş have holiday homes in Elmalı, a retreat from the summer heat on the coast. There is little industry or manufacturing in the district, only a brickworks, flour and feed mills, and a fruit juice plant.

Most people live in cottages and wooden houses, but there are some apartment buildings in Elmalı itself, a small town of 14,500 people with banks and other essential services. The infrastructure in the villages is basically little more than telephones, and elementary schools. Each village used to have a traditional guest house (köy evi) but many are in disrepair today.

The cuisine is typical of Anatolia, where ladies grilling the flat bread gözleme by the roadside, but Elmalı is known for its various ways of using sesame, including baked beans served with a lemon and sesame relish (Antalya usulu piyaz). Another local speciality is goat milk ice-cream.

== Places of interest ==
- There are a number of mosques, prayer schools and other buildings from the Beylik of Teke and the Ottoman periods. Of particular interest are the library containing a collection of Ottoman writings and the mosque and medrese (prayer school) of Ömer Paşa, (1602), student of the great Ottoman architect, Mimar Sinan. There is an earlier, Seljuk period minaret opposite the mosque. Other Ottoman buildings include the tombs of Abdül Vehhat and Abdal Musa; the mosque of Sinan-i Ümmi; the Bey Hamamı (bathhouse); the fountain of Çatalçeşme, (in the centre, behind the broken minaret).
- Recent excavation has revealed a great number of tombs and relics from antique Lycia, and even earlier.
- The Lycian castle of Gilevgi, between the villages of Gilevgi and Çobanisa.

There are of course many places for picnics in the forest, and there is an oil wrestling tournament in the first week of September.

== Elmalı Treasures ==
(Elmalı Hazinesi) is the name commonly given in Turkey to an important find of antique treasure; 1,900 silver coins (including 1,100 from Lycia and 14 extremely rare decadrachms) from the Delian League. They were discovered during an illegal excavation in 1984 in Bayındır village, Elmalı and smuggled to the U.S. and European countries. The hoard was reassembled by William Koch with the advice of the numismatists Jeffry Spier and Jonathan Kagan, and a symposium was held to publish and exploit the information gained. The efforts of the journalist Özgen Acar and the Turkish government made the headlines in late 1990s and led to the return of the reassembled hoard. Today, the coins are on exhibit in Elmalı Museum.

== Well-known residents ==
- Elmalılı Hamdi Yazır (1877–1942) Muslim cleric whose Turkish language Koran is accepted as a standard translation. He was born in Elmalı (although his family descended from Yazır Turkmens of Burdur). He represented Antalya in the parliament of the Second Constitutional Era (Ottoman Empire) in 1906 and later wrote on religious matters for the government of the Turkish Republic, on behalf of Atatürk himself.
- Abdal Musa, a well-known sufi preacher, a relative of Hacı Bektash Veli. There is a festival to commemorate him held every June in the village of Tekke, where he is buried.
