= Akbaşak, Çüngüş =

Village in Turkey

Akbaşak
- Neighbourhood
- Location in Turkey
- Coordinates: 38.2706°N 39.3158°E
- Country: Turkey
- Province: Diyarbakır
- District: Çüngüş
- Population (2022): 341
- Time zone: UTC+3 (TRT)

Akbaşak is a neighbourhood in the municipality and district of Çüngüş, Diyarbakır Province in Turkey. Its population is 341 (2022).
