= Yılmazlı, Elmalı =

Yılmazlı
- Neighbourhood
- Location in Turkey
- Coordinates: 36°48′N 29°48′E
- Country: Turkey
- Province: Antalya
- District: Elmalı
- Population (2022): 338
- Time zone: UTC+3 (TRT)

Yılmazlı is a neighbourhood in the municipality and district of Elmalı, Antalya Province, Turkey. Its population is 338 (2022).
