= Omer Pasha Mosque =

Mosque in Antalya, Turkey

Coordinates: 36.74292°N 29.91417°E

Omer Pasha Mosque was built by Ketendji Omer Pasha in 1602. It is located in Elmalı, Antalya Province, Turkey. The mosque, built entirely of cut stone, has a single dome. It reflects the classical Ottoman architecture. The mosque was built on a sloping area with a square plan. The mosque is the biggest Ottoman mosque in the Antalya area.
