= Polatuşağı, Çüngüş =

Village in Turkey

Polatuşağı
- Neighbourhood
- Location in Turkey
- Coordinates: 38°16′N 39°26′E
- Country: Turkey
- Province: Diyarbakır
- District: Çüngüş
- Population (2022): 106
- Time zone: UTC+3 (TRT)

Polatuşağı is a neighbourhood in the municipality and district of Çüngüş, Diyarbakır Province in Turkey. Its population is 106 (2022).
