= Sandıklı, İncirliova =

Sandıklı
- Neighbourhood
- Location in Turkey Sandıklı (Turkey Aegean)
- Coordinates: 37°50′49″N 27°44′02″E
- Country: Turkey
- Province: Aydın
- District: İncirliova
- Population (2022): 3,798
- Time zone: UTC+3 (TRT)

Sandıklı is a neighbourhood in the municipality and district of İncirliova, Aydın Province, Turkey. Its population is 3,798 (2022).
