= Beyköy, İncirliova =

Beyköy
- Neighbourhood
- Location in Turkey Beyköy (Turkey Aegean)
- Coordinates: 37.9638°N 27.7824°E
- Country: Turkey
- Province: Aydın
- District: İncirliova
- Population (2022): 411
- Time zone: UTC+3 (TRT)

Beyköy is a neighbourhood in the municipality and district of İncirliova, Aydın Province, Turkey. Its population is 411 (2022).
