= Bozhüyük, Elmalı =

Bozhüyük
- Neighbourhood
- Location in Turkey
- Coordinates: 36.7573°N 30.0080°E
- Country: Turkey
- Province: Antalya
- District: Elmalı
- Population (2022): 2,654
- Time zone: UTC+3 (TRT)

Bozhüyük is a neighbourhood in the municipality and district of Elmalı, Antalya Province, Turkey. Its population is 2,654 (2022).
