= Kocapınar, Elmalı =

Kocapınar
- Neighbourhood
- Location in Turkey
- Coordinates: 36.7176°N 29.9612°E
- Country: Turkey
- Province: Antalya
- District: Elmalı
- Population (2022): 345
- Time zone: UTC+3 (TRT)

Kocapınar is a neighbourhood in the municipality and district of Elmalı, Antalya Province, Turkey. Its population is 345 (2022).
