= Osmanbükü, İncirliova =

Neighbourhood in Turkey

Osmanbükü
- Neighbourhood
- Location in Turkey Osmanbükü (Turkey Aegean)
- Coordinates: 37°48′N 27°46′E
- Country: Turkey
- Province: Aydın
- District: İncirliova
- Population (2022): 996
- Time zone: UTC+3 (TRT)

Osmanbükü is a neighbourhood in the municipality and district of İncirliova, Aydın Province, Turkey. Its population is 996 (2022).
