= Karagözler, İncirliova =

Karagözler
- Neighbourhood
- Location in Turkey Karagözler (Turkey Aegean)
- Coordinates: 37°56′N 27°48′E
- Country: Turkey
- Province: Aydın
- District: İncirliova
- Population (2022): 295
- Time zone: UTC+3 (TRT)

Karagözler is a neighbourhood in the municipality and district of İncirliova, Aydın Province, Turkey. Its population is 295 (2022).
