= Keleşevleri, Çüngüş =

Village in Turkey

Keleşevleri
- Neighbourhood
- Location in Turkey
- Coordinates: 38°12′N 39°20′E
- Country: Turkey
- Province: Diyarbakır
- District: Çüngüş
- Population (2022): 235
- Time zone: UTC+3 (TRT)

Keleşevleri is a neighbourhood in the municipality and district of Çüngüş, Diyarbakır Province in Turkey. Its population is 235 (2022).
