= Şirindere, İncirliova =

Şirindere
- Neighbourhood
- Country: Turkey
- Province: Aydın
- District: İncirliova
- Population (2022): 223
- Time zone: UTC+3 (TRT)

Şirindere is a neighbourhood in the municipality and district of İncirliova, Aydın Province, Turkey. Its population is 223 (2022).
