= Büyüksöğle, Elmalı =

Büyüksöğle
- Neighbourhood
- Location in Turkey
- Coordinates: 36°42′N 30°02′E
- Country: Turkey
- Province: Antalya
- District: Elmalı
- Population (2022): 411
- Time zone: UTC+3 (TRT)

Büyüksöğle is a neighbourhood in the municipality and district of Elmalı, Antalya Province, Turkey. Its population is 411 (2022).
