= Kızılca, Elmalı =

Kızılca
- Neighbourhood
- Location in Turkey
- Coordinates: 36.6607°N 29.8107°E
- Country: Turkey
- Province: Antalya
- District: Elmalı
- Population (2022): 174
- Time zone: UTC+3 (TRT)

Kızılca is a neighbourhood in the municipality and district of Elmalı, Antalya Province, Turkey. Its population is 174 (2022).
