= Çukurelma, Elmalı =

Çukurelma
- Neighbourhood
- Location in Turkey
- Coordinates: 36.8277°N 30.0082°E
- Country: Turkey
- Province: Antalya
- District: Elmalı
- Population (2022): 359
- Time zone: UTC+3 (TRT)

Çukurelma is a neighbourhood in the municipality and district of Elmalı, Antalya Province, Turkey. Its population is 359 (2022).
