= Yeniköy, Çüngüş =

Village in Turkey

Yeniköy
- Neighbourhood
- Location in Turkey
- Coordinates: 38°11′28″N 39°24′29″E
- Country: Turkey
- Province: Diyarbakır
- District: Çüngüş
- Population (2022): 1,014
- Time zone: UTC+3 (TRT)

Yeniköy is a neighbourhood in the municipality and district of Çüngüş, Diyarbakır Province in Turkey. Its population is 1,014 (2022).
