= Pirhasanlar, Elmalı =

Pirhasanlar
- Neighbourhood
- Location in Turkey
- Coordinates: 36°41′N 29°52′E
- Country: Turkey
- Province: Antalya
- District: Elmalı
- Population (2022): 328
- Time zone: UTC+3 (TRT)

Pirhasanlar is a neighbourhood in the municipality and district of Elmalı, Antalya Province, Turkey. Its population is 328 (2022).
