= Sarılar, Elmalı =

Sarılar
- Neighbourhood
- Location in Turkey
- Coordinates: 36.6387°N 29.7989°E
- Country: Turkey
- Province: Antalya
- District: Elmalı
- Population (2022): 215
- Time zone: UTC+3 (TRT)

Sarılar is a neighbourhood in the municipality and district of Elmalı, Antalya Province, Turkey. Its population is 215 (2022).
