= Çaybaşı, Elmalı =

Çaybaşı
- Neighbourhood
- Location in Turkey
- Coordinates: 36.6136°N 29.7923°E
- Country: Turkey
- Province: Antalya
- District: Elmalı
- Population (2022): 408
- Time zone: UTC+3 (TRT)

Çaybaşı is a neighbourhood in the municipality and district of Elmalı, Antalya Province, Turkey. Its population is 408 (2022).
