= Yaygınkonak, Çüngüş =

Village in Turkey

Yaygınkonak
- Neighbourhood
- Location in Turkey
- Coordinates: 38°19′N 39°21′E
- Country: Turkey
- Province: Diyarbakır
- District: Çüngüş
- Population (2022): 156
- Time zone: UTC+3 (TRT)

Yaygınkonak is a neighbourhood in the municipality and district of Çüngüş, Diyarbakır Province in Turkey. Its population is 156 (2022).
