= Dereköy, Elmalı =

Dereköy
- Neighbourhood
- Location in Turkey
- Coordinates: 36.8283°N 29.8539°E
- Country: Turkey
- Province: Antalya
- District: Elmalı
- Population (2022): 68
- Time zone: UTC+3 (TRT)

Dereköy is a neighbourhood in the municipality and district of Elmalı, Antalya Province, Turkey. Its population is 68 (2022).
