= Hindibaba, Çüngüş =

Village in Turkey

Hindibaba
- Neighbourhood
- Location in Turkey
- Coordinates: 38°13′N 39°13′E
- Country: Turkey
- Province: Diyarbakır
- District: Çüngüş
- Population (2022): 566
- Time zone: UTC+3 (TRT)

Hindibaba is a neighbourhood in the municipality and district of Çüngüş, Diyarbakır Province in Turkey. Its population is 566 (2022).
