= Acarlar, İncirliova =

Acarlar
- Neighbourhood
- Location in Turkey Acarlar (Turkey Aegean)
- Coordinates: 37°49′28″N 27°44′48″E
- Country: Turkey
- Province: Aydın
- District: İncirliova
- Elevation: 30 m (98 ft)
- Population (2022): 12,297
- Time zone: UTC+3 (TRT)
- Postal code: 09610
- Area code: 0256

Acarlar is a neighbourhood of the municipality and district of İncirliova, Aydın Province, Turkey. Its population is 12,297 (2022). Before the 2013 reorganisation, it was a town (belde). It is situated to the south of İncirliova and Turkish state highway D.550. The distance to İncirliova is 4 kilometres (2.5 mi) to Aydın is 12 kilometres (7.5 mi).

According to the mayor's page, the settlement was founded by a group of people who named themselves as "Abdals" from Adana (although an alternative theory claims that these people were refugees from Russia after a Russo-Turkish War). In 1930s, the settlement was named by the governor of the province. In 1972, it was declared a seat of township.
