= Tavullar, Elmalı =

Tavullar
- Neighbourhood
- Location in Turkey
- Coordinates: 36°40′N 29°50′E
- Country: Turkey
- Province: Antalya
- District: Elmalı
- Population (2022): 292
- Time zone: UTC+3 (TRT)

Tavullar is a neighbourhood in the municipality and district of Elmalı, Antalya Province, Turkey. Its population is 292 (2022).
