= Gökpınar, Elmalı =

Gökpınar
- Neighbourhood
- Location in Turkey
- Coordinates: 36.7500°N 29.9548°E
- Country: Turkey
- Province: Antalya
- District: Elmalı
- Population (2022): 1,177
- Time zone: UTC+3 (TRT)

Gökpınar is a neighbourhood in the municipality and district of Elmalı, Antalya Province, Turkey. Its population is 1,177 (2022).
