= Üçpınar, Çüngüş =

Village in Turkey

Üçpınar
- Neighbourhood
- Location in Turkey
- Coordinates: 38°15′36″N 39°10′19″E
- Country: Turkey
- Province: Diyarbakır
- District: Çüngüş
- Population (2022): 79
- Time zone: UTC+3 (TRT)

Üçpınar is a neighbourhood in the municipality and district of Çüngüş, Diyarbakır Province in Turkey. Its population is 79 (2022).
