= Bayralar, Elmalı =

Bayralar
- Neighbourhood
- Location in Turkey
- Coordinates: 36°39′N 29°53′E
- Country: Turkey
- Province: Antalya
- District: Elmalı
- Population (2022): 917
- Time zone: UTC+3 (TRT)

Bayralar is a neighbourhood in the municipality and district of Elmalı, Antalya Province, Turkey. Its population is 917 (2022).
