= Yazıdere, İncirliova =

Yazıdere
- Neighbourhood
- Country: Turkey
- Province: Aydın
- District: İncirliova
- Population (2022): 458
- Time zone: UTC+3 (TRT)

Yazıdere is a neighbourhood in the municipality and district of İncirliova, Aydın Province, Turkey. Its population is 458 (2022).
