= Armutlu, Elmalı =

Armutlu
- Neighbourhood
- Location in Turkey
- Coordinates: 36.5836°N 29.7762°E
- Country: Turkey
- Province: Antalya
- District: Elmalı
- Population (2022): 274
- Time zone: UTC+3 (TRT)

Armutlu is a neighbourhood in the municipality and district of Elmalı, Antalya Province, Turkey. Its population is 274 (2022).
