= Karaköy, Elmalı =

Karaköy
- Neighbourhood
- Location in Turkey
- Coordinates: 36.8406°N 30.0719°E
- Country: Turkey
- Province: Antalya
- District: Elmalı
- Population (2022): 71
- Time zone: UTC+3 (TRT)

Karaköy is a neighbourhood in the municipality and district of Elmalı, Antalya Province, Turkey. Its population is 71 (2022).
