= Çataldut, Çüngüş =

Village in Turkey

Çataldut
- Neighbourhood
- Location in Turkey
- Coordinates: 38.3211°N 39.2732°E
- Country: Turkey
- Province: Diyarbakır
- District: Çüngüş
- Population (2022): 87
- Time zone: UTC+3 (TRT)

Çataldut is a neighbourhood in the municipality and district of Çüngüş, Diyarbakır Province in Turkey. Its population is 87 (2022).
