= İsafakılar, İncirliova =

İsafakılar
- Neighbourhood
- Location in Turkey İsafakılar (Turkey Aegean)
- Coordinates: 37°58′12″N 27°42′43″E
- Country: Turkey
- Province: Aydın
- District: İncirliova
- Population (2022): 304
- Time zone: UTC+3 (TRT)

İsafakılar is a neighbourhood in the municipality and district of İncirliova, Aydın Province, Turkey. Its population is 304 (2022).
