= Eğrek, İncirliova =

Eğrek
- Neighbourhood
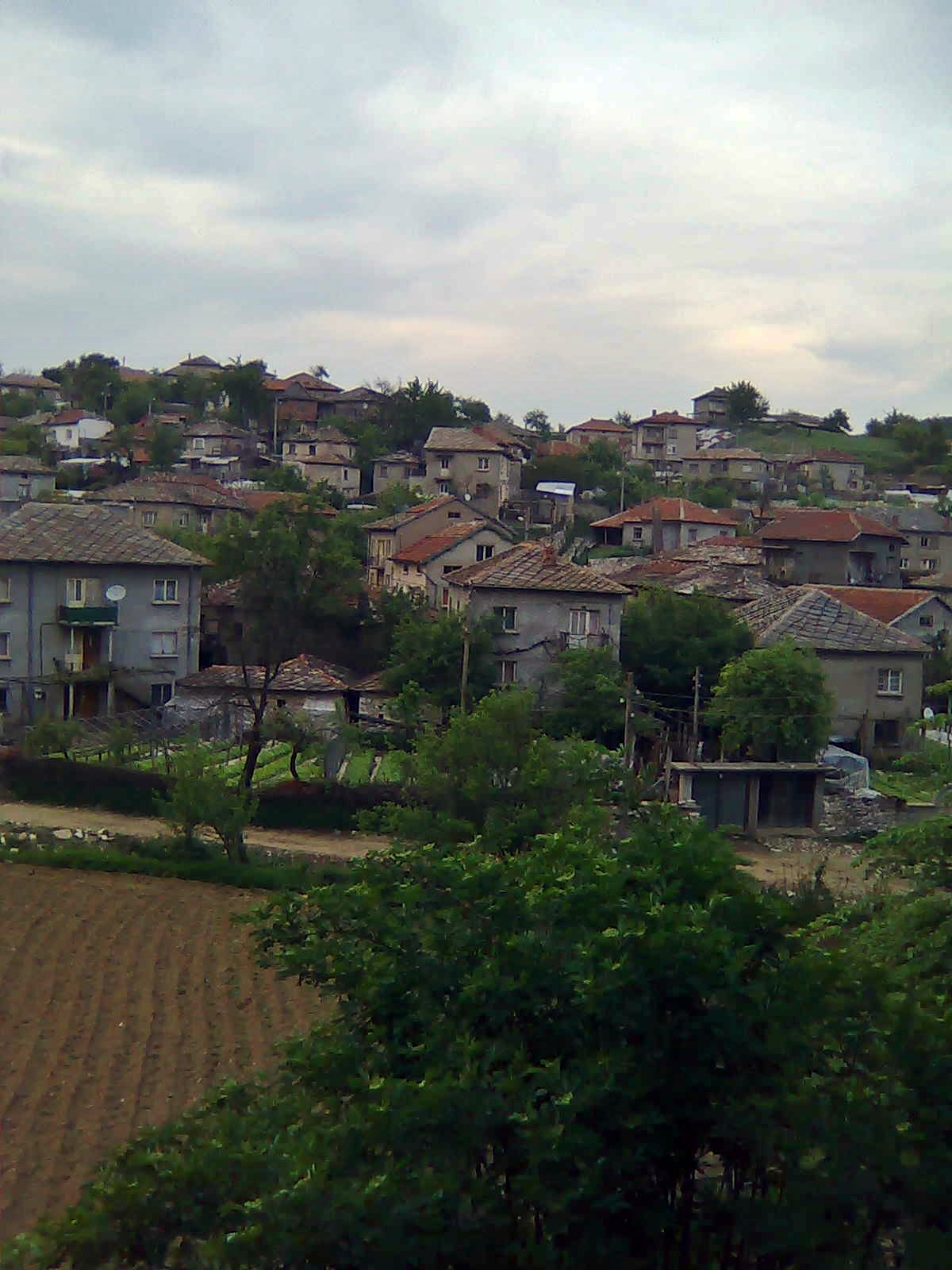

- Location within Turkey Location within Turkey Aegean
- Coordinates: 37°55′59″N 27°42′25″E
- Country: Turkey
- Province: Aydın
- District: İncirliova
- Population (2022): 381
- Time zone: UTC+3 (TRT)

Eğrek is a neighbourhood in the municipality and district of İncirliova, Aydın Province, Turkey. Its population is 381 (2022).
