= Çobanisa, Elmalı =

Çobanisa
- Neighbourhood
- Location in Turkey
- Coordinates: 36.8598°N 30.0256°E
- Country: Turkey
- Province: Antalya
- District: Elmalı
- Population (2022): 164
- Time zone: UTC+3 (TRT)

Çobanisa is a neighbourhood in the municipality and district of Elmalı, Antalya Province, Turkey. Its population is 164 (2022).
