= Dereağzı, İncirliova =

Dereağzı
- Neighbourhood
- Location in Turkey Dereağzı (Turkey Aegean)
- Coordinates: 37.8731°N 27.7381°E
- Country: Turkey
- Province: Aydın
- District: İncirliova
- Population (2022): 625
- Time zone: UTC+3 (TRT)

Dereağzı is a neighbourhood in the municipality and district of İncirliova, Aydın Province, Turkey. Its population is 625 (2022).
