= Arzular, İncirliova =

Arzular
- Neighbourhood
- Location in Turkey Arzular (Turkey Aegean)
- Coordinates: 37°53′56″N 27°42′0″E
- Country: Turkey
- Province: Aydın
- District: İncirliova
- Population (2022): 258
- Time zone: UTC+3 (TRT)

Arzular is a neighbourhood in the municipality and district of İncirliova, Aydın Province, Turkey. Its population is 258 (2022).
