= Yukarışeyhler, Çüngüş =

Village in Turkey

Coordinates: 38°15′9″N 39°30′11″E

Yukarışeyhler
- Neighbourhood
- Location in Turkey
- Coordinates
- Country: Turkey
- Province: Diyarbakır
- District: Çüngüş
- Population (2022): 809
- Time zone: UTC+3 (TRT)

Yukarışeyhler is a neighbourhood of the municipality and district of Çüngüş, Diyarbakır Province, Turkey. Its population is 809 (2022). Before the 2013 reorganisation, it was a town (belde). In 2010 it passed from the Çermik District to the Çüngüş District.
