= Afşar, Elmalı =

Afşar
- Neighbourhood
- Location in Turkey
- Coordinates: 36.5674°N 29.7502°E
- Country: Turkey
- Province: Antalya
- District: Elmalı
- Population (2022): 267
- Time zone: UTC+3 (TRT)

Afşar is a neighbourhood in the municipality and district of Elmalı, Antalya Province, Turkey. Its population is 267 (2022).
