= Zümrütova, Elmalı =

Zümrütova
- Neighbourhood
- Location in Turkey
- Coordinates: 36.6027°N 29.8079°E
- Country: Turkey
- Province: Antalya
- District: Elmalı
- Population (2022): 776
- Time zone: UTC+3 (TRT)

Zümrütova is a neighbourhood in the municipality and district of Elmalı, Antalya Province, Turkey. Its population is 776 (2022).
