= Yazyağmuru, Çüngüş =

Village in Turkey

Yazyağmuru
- Neighbourhood
- Location in Turkey
- Coordinates: 38°19′40″N 39°16′26″E
- Country: Turkey
- Province: Diyarbakır
- District: Çüngüş
- Population (2022): 32
- Time zone: UTC+3 (TRT)

Yazyağmuru is a neighbourhood in the municipality and district of Çüngüş, Diyarbakır Province in Turkey. Its population is 32 (2022).
