= Köprüova, İncirliova =

Köprüova
- Neighbourhood
- Location in Turkey Köprüova (Turkey Aegean)
- Coordinates: 37°57′N 27°46′E
- Country: Turkey
- Province: Aydın
- District: İncirliova
- Population (2022): 139
- Time zone: UTC+3 (TRT)

Köprüova is a neighbourhood in the municipality and district of İncirliova, Aydın Province, Turkey. Its population is 139 (2022).
