= Ovacık, Elmalı =

Ovacık
- Neighbourhood
- Location in Turkey
- Coordinates: 36.7911°N 30.1833°E
- Country: Turkey
- Province: Antalya
- District: Elmalı
- Population (2022): 95
- Time zone: UTC+3 (TRT)

Ovacık is a neighbourhood in the municipality and district of Elmalı, Antalya Province, Turkey. Its population is 95 (2022).
