= Ahatlı, Elmalı =

Ahatlı
- Neighbourhood
- Location in Turkey
- Coordinates: 36.6164°N 29.7364°E
- Country: Turkey
- Province: Antalya
- District: Elmalı
- Population (2022): 451
- Time zone: UTC+3 (TRT)

Ahatlı is a neighbourhood in the municipality and district of Elmalı, Antalya Province, Turkey. Its population is 451 (2022).
