= Gümüşyaka, Elmalı =

Gümüşyaka
- Neighbourhood
- Location in Turkey
- Coordinates: 36.8555°N 29.9771°E
- Country: Turkey
- Province: Antalya
- District: Elmalı
- Population (2022): 107
- Time zone: UTC+3 (TRT)

Gümüşyaka is a neighbourhood in the municipality and district of Elmalı, Antalya Province, Turkey. Its population is 107 (2022).
