= Elyos, Çüngüş =

Village in Turkey

Elyos
- Neighbourhood
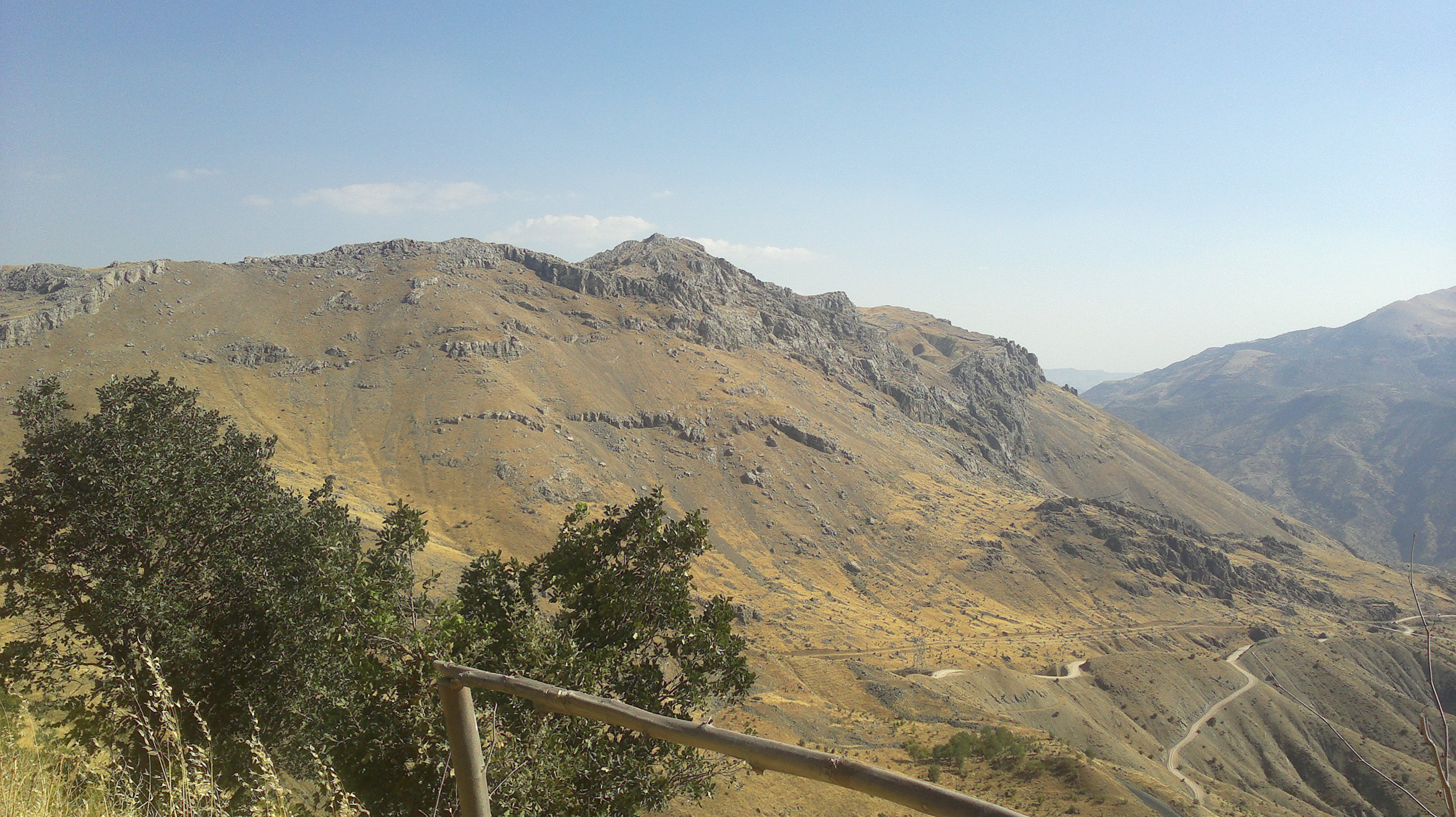

- Location within Turkey
- Country: Turkey
- Province: Diyarbakır
- District: Çüngüş
- Population (2022): 151
- Time zone: UTC+3 (TRT)

Elyos (formerly: Malkaya) is a neighbourhood in the municipality and district of Çüngüş, Diyarbakır Province in Turkey. Its population is 151 (2022).
