= Sağtepe, Çüngüş =

Village in Turkey

Sağtepe
- Neighbourhood
- Location in Turkey
- Coordinates: 38°14′N 39°22′E
- Country: Turkey
- Province: Diyarbakır
- District: Çüngüş
- Population (2022): 380
- Time zone: UTC+3 (TRT)

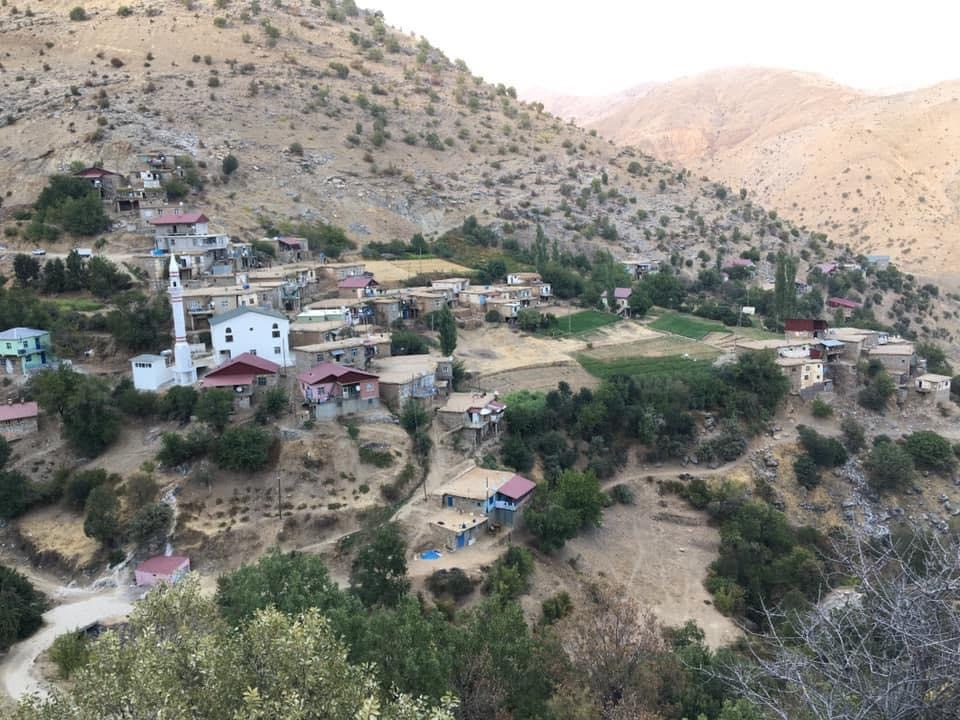

Sağtepe is a neighbourhood in the municipality and district of Çüngüş, Diyarbakır Province in Turkey. Its population is 380 (2022).
