= Gökçepelit, Çüngüş =

Village in Turkey

Gökçepelit
- Neighbourhood
- Location in Turkey
- Coordinates: 38°17′N 39°17′E
- Country: Turkey
- Province: Diyarbakır
- District: Çüngüş
- Population (2022): 63
- Time zone: UTC+3 (TRT)

Gökçepelit is a neighbourhood in the municipality and district of Çüngüş, Diyarbakır Province in Turkey. Its population is 63 (2022).
