= Kışlaköy, Elmalı =

Kışlaköy
- Neighbourhood
- Location in Turkey
- Coordinates: 36.7478°N 29.8614°E
- Country: Turkey
- Province: Antalya
- District: Elmalı
- Population (2022): 354
- Time zone: UTC+3 (TRT)

Kışlaköy is a neighbourhood in the municipality and district of Elmalı, Antalya Province, Turkey. Its population is 354 (2022).
