= Yörenler, Elmalı =

Yörenler
- Neighbourhood
- Location in Turkey
- Coordinates: 36°49′N 29°49′E
- Country: Turkey
- Province: Antalya
- District: Elmalı
- Population (2022): 72
- Time zone: UTC+3 (TRT)

Yörenler is a neighbourhood in the municipality and district of Elmalı, Antalya Province, Turkey. Its population is 72 (2022).
