= İslamlar, Elmalı =

İslamlar
- Neighbourhood
- Location in Turkey
- Coordinates: 36.6329°N 29.7663°E
- Country: Turkey
- Province: Antalya
- District: Elmalı
- Population (2022): 541
- Time zone: UTC+3 (TRT)

İslamlar is a neighbourhood in the municipality and district of Elmalı, Antalya Province, Turkey. Its population is 541 (2022).
