= Avut, Çüngüş =

Village in Turkey

Avut
- Neighbourhood
- Location in Turkey
- Coordinates: 38.2982°N 39.2201°E
- Country: Turkey
- Province: Diyarbakır
- District: Çüngüş
- Population (2022): 80
- Time zone: UTC+3 (TRT)

Avut is a neighbourhood in the municipality and district of Çüngüş, Diyarbakır Province in Turkey. Its population was 80 in 2022.
