= Tekkeköy, Elmalı =

Tekkeköy
- Neighbourhood
- Location in Turkey
- Coordinates: 36.6172°N 29.8700°E
- Country: Turkey
- Province: Antalya
- District: Elmalı
- Population (2022): 1,041
- Time zone: UTC+3 (TRT)

Tekkeköy (also: Tekke) is a neighbourhood in the municipality and district of Elmalı, Antalya Province, Turkey. Its population is 1,041 (2022).
