= Karabağ, İncirliova =

Karabağ
- Neighbourhood
- Location in Turkey Karabağ (Turkey Aegean)
- Coordinates: 37°53′03″N 27°42′33″E
- Country: Turkey
- Province: Aydın
- District: İncirliova
- Population (2022): 399
- Time zone: UTC+3 (TRT)

Karabağ is a neighbourhood in the municipality and district of İncirliova, Aydın Province, Turkey. Its population is 399 (2022).
