= Hacıaliobası, İncirliova =

Hacıaliobası
- Neighbourhood
- Location in Turkey Hacıaliobası (Turkey Aegean)
- Coordinates: 37°49′59″N 27°42′29″E
- Country: Turkey
- Province: Aydın
- District: İncirliova
- Population (2022): 969
- Time zone: UTC+3 (TRT)

Hacıaliobası is a neighbourhood in the municipality and district of İncirliova, Aydın Province, Turkey. Its population is 969 (2022).
