= Beyler, Elmalı =

Beyler
- Neighbourhood
- Location in Turkey
- Coordinates: 36.6560°N 29.8619°E
- Country: Turkey
- Province: Antalya
- District: Elmalı
- Population (2022): 241
- Time zone: UTC+3 (TRT)

Beyler is a neighbourhood in the municipality and district of Elmalı, Antalya Province, Turkey. Its population is 241 (2022).
