= İbikkaya, Çüngüş =

Village in Turkey

İbikkaya
- Neighbourhood
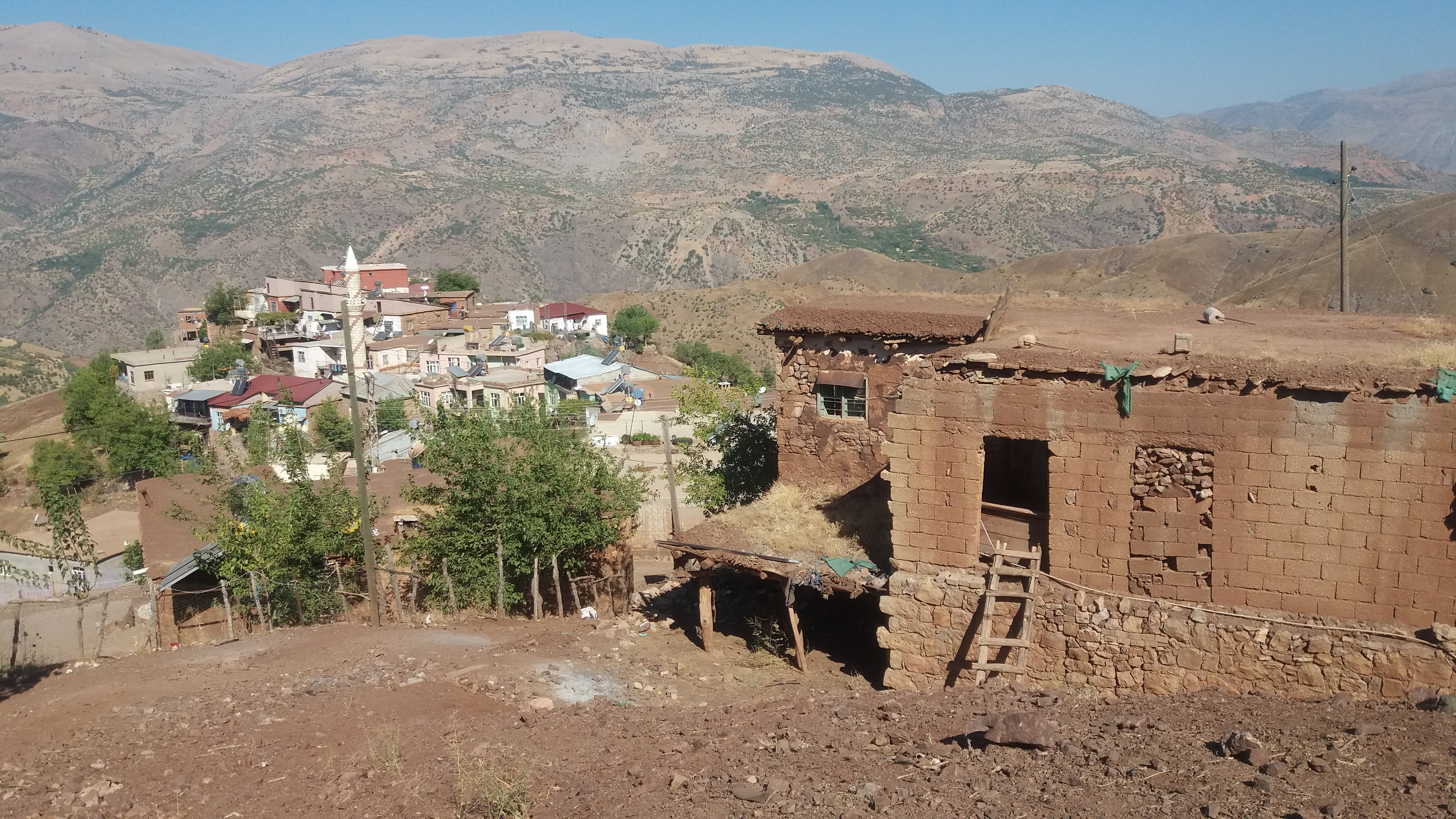

- Location within Turkey
- Coordinates: 38°07′N 39°17′E
- Country: Turkey
- Province: Diyarbakır
- District: Çüngüş
- Population (2022): 251
- Time zone: UTC+3 (TRT)

İbikkaya is a neighbourhood in the municipality and district of Çüngüş, Diyarbakır Province in Turkey. Its population is 251 (2022).
