= Karamık, Elmalı =

Karamık
- Neighbourhood
- Location in Turkey
- Coordinates: 36.6073°N 29.9000°E
- Country: Turkey
- Province: Antalya
- District: Elmalı
- Population (2022): 324
- Time zone: UTC+3 (TRT)

Karamık is a neighbourhood in the municipality and district of Elmalı, Antalya Province, Turkey. Its population is 324 (2022).
