= Akçay, Elmalı =

Akçay
- Neighbourhood
- Location in Turkey
- Coordinates: 36.6022°N 29.7463°E
- Country: Turkey
- Province: Antalya
- District: Elmalı
- Population (2022): 1,309
- Time zone: UTC+3 (TRT)

Akçay is a neighbourhood in the municipality and district of Elmalı, Antalya Province, Turkey. Its population is 1,309 (2022). Before the 2013 reorganisation, it was a town (belde).
