= Çüngüş =

- District and municipality
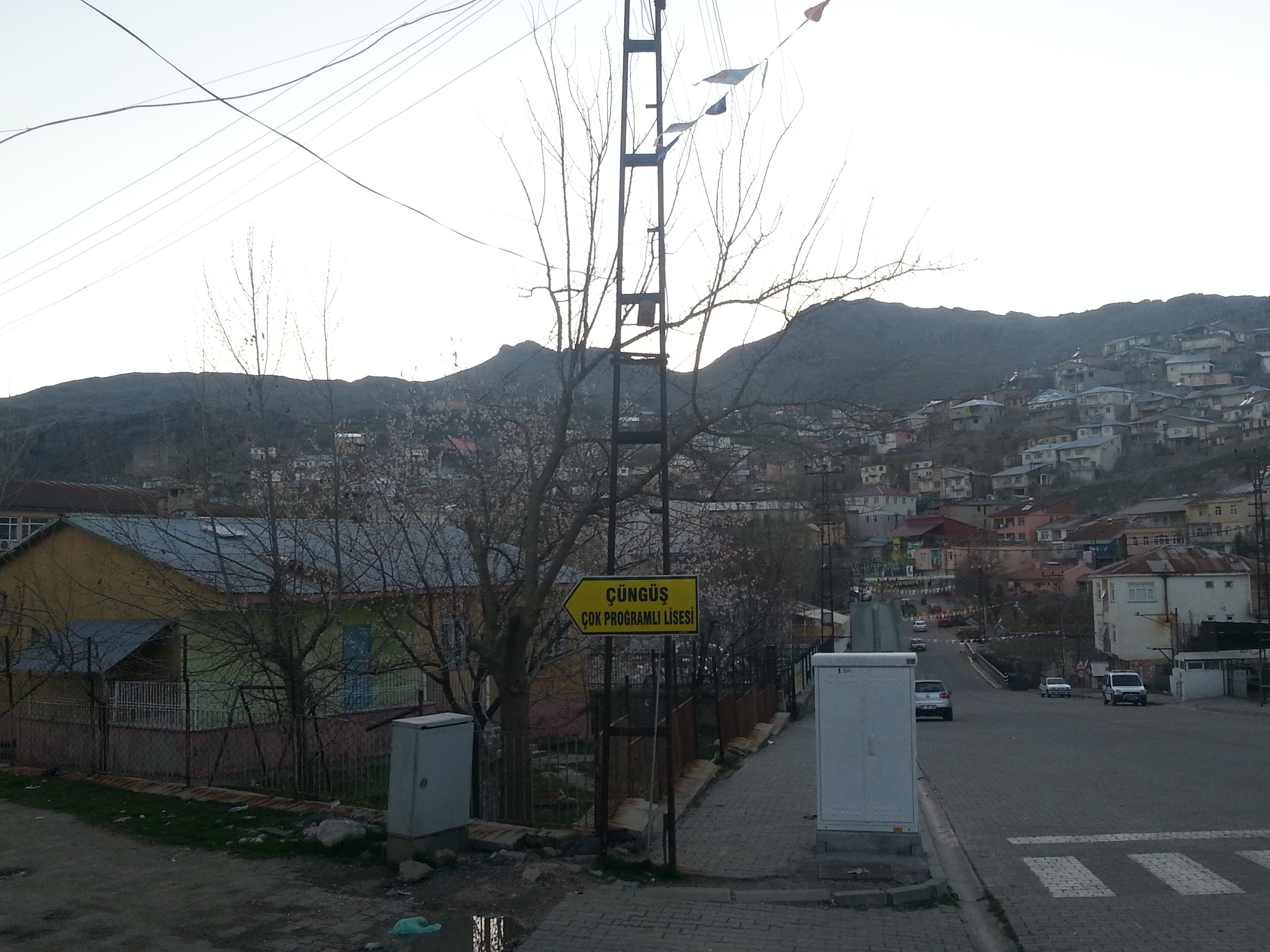

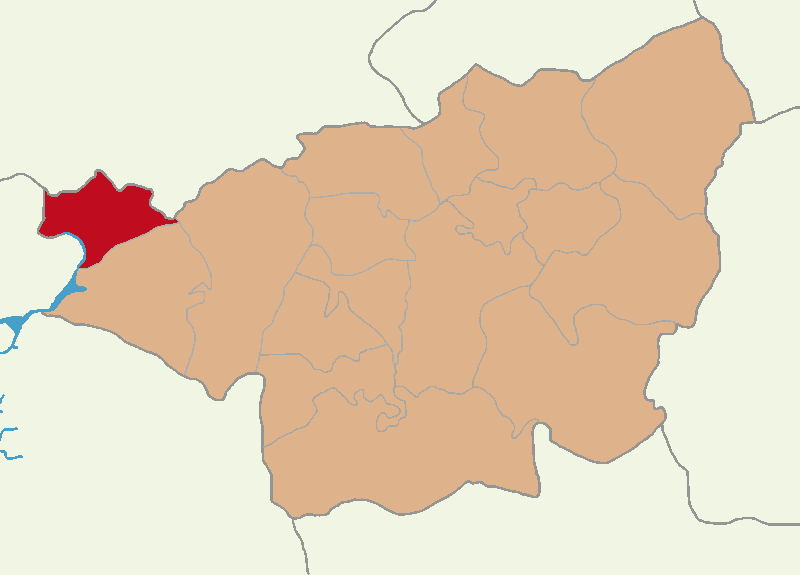
- Map showing Çüngüş District in Diyarbakır Province

- Location within Turkey
- Coordinates: 38°12′46″N 39°17′13″E
- Country: Turkey
- Province: Diyarbakır

Government
  - Mayor: Ali Suat Akmeşe (AKP)
- Area: 512 km^{2} (198 sq mi)
- Elevation: 1,049 m (3,442 ft)
- Population (2022): 10,720
  - Density: 20.9/km^{2} (54.2/sq mi)
- Time zone: UTC+3 (TRT)
- Postal code: 21870
- Area code: 0412
- Website: www.cungus.bel.tr

Çüngüş (Ottoman Turkish: چونکوش, Kurdish: Çêngûş, Armenian: Չնքուշ, romanized: Chnkush, Chunkoush) is a municipality and district of Diyarbakır Province, Turkey. Its area is 512 km^{2}, and its population is 10,720 (2022).

Çüngüş was an Armenian bishopric an Armenian Church was constructed in 1841. It was a large and flourishing Armenian town. Besides the church a monastery was located. In 1915, Çüngüş was the site of a massacre during the Armenian genocide in which around 10,000 Armenians living in the area were taken to the Dudan crevasse and murdered by being thrown into the chasm. The massacre was remembered and recorded by the local Kurdish population, and a memorial to victims of the killings was recorded in the film 100 Years Later (2016).

== Composition ==
There are 40 neighbourhoods in Çüngüş District:

- Akbaşak
- Aktaş
- Albayrak
- Arpadere
- Atalar
- Avut
- Aydınlı
- Balcılar
- Camiikebir
- Camiisuk
- Çataldut
- Çaybaşı
- Değirmensuyu
- Deveboynu
- Elmadere
- Elyos
- Gökçepelit
- Güneydere
- Handere
- Hindibaba
- Hoya
- İbikkaya
- Karakaya
- Karşıyaka
- Kaynakköy
- Keleşevleri
- Koçören
- Norşin
- Ormançayı
- Oyuklu
- Polatuşağı
- Sağtepe
- Seferuşağı
- Türkmen
- Üçpınar
- Yaygınkonak
- Yazyağmuru
- Yenice
- Yeniköy
- Yukarışeyhler
