= Sınırteke, İncirliova =

Sınırteke
- Neighbourhood
- Location in Turkey Sınırteke (Turkey Aegean)
- Coordinates: 37°51′N 27°40′E
- Country: Turkey
- Province: Aydın
- District: İncirliova
- Population (2022): 977
- Time zone: UTC+3 (TRT)

Sınırteke is a neighbourhood in the municipality and district of İncirliova, Aydın Province, Turkey. Its population is 977 (2022).
