= Yalnızdam, Elmalı =

Yalnızdam
- Neighbourhood
- Country: Turkey
- Province: Antalya
- District: Elmalı
- Population (2022): 304
- Time zone: UTC+3 (TRT)

Yalnızdam is a neighbourhood in the municipality and district of Elmalı, Antalya Province, Turkey. Its population is 304 (2022).
