= Balcılar, Çüngüş =

Village in Turkey

Balcılar
- Neighbourhood
- Location in Turkey
- Coordinates: 38.2431°N 39.4436°E
- Country: Turkey
- Province: Diyarbakır
- District: Çüngüş
- Population (2022): 315
- Time zone: UTC+3 (TRT)

Balcılar is a neighbourhood in the municipality and district of Çüngüş, Diyarbakır Province in Turkey. Its population is 315 (2022).
