= Aktaş, Çüngüş =

Village in Turkey

Aktaş
- Neighbourhood
- Location in Turkey
- Coordinates: 38.2414°N 39.3261°E
- Country: Turkey
- Province: Diyarbakır
- District: Çüngüş
- Population (2022): 135
- Time zone: UTC+3 (TRT)

Aktaş is a neighbourhood in the municipality and district of Çüngüş, Diyarbakır Province in Turkey. (Its population was 135 in 2022).
