= Çaybaşı, Çüngüş =

Village in Turkey

Çaybaşı
- Neighbourhood
- Country: Turkey
- Province: Diyarbakır
- District: Çüngüş
- Population (2022): 60
- Time zone: UTC+3 (TRT)

Çaybaşı is a neighbourhood in the municipality and district of Çüngüş, Diyarbakır Province in Turkey. Its population is 60 (2022).
