= Yakaçiftlikköyü, Elmalı =

Yakaçiftlikköyü
- Neighbourhood
- Country: Turkey
- Province: Antalya
- District: Elmalı
- Population (2022): 439
- Time zone: UTC+3 (TRT)

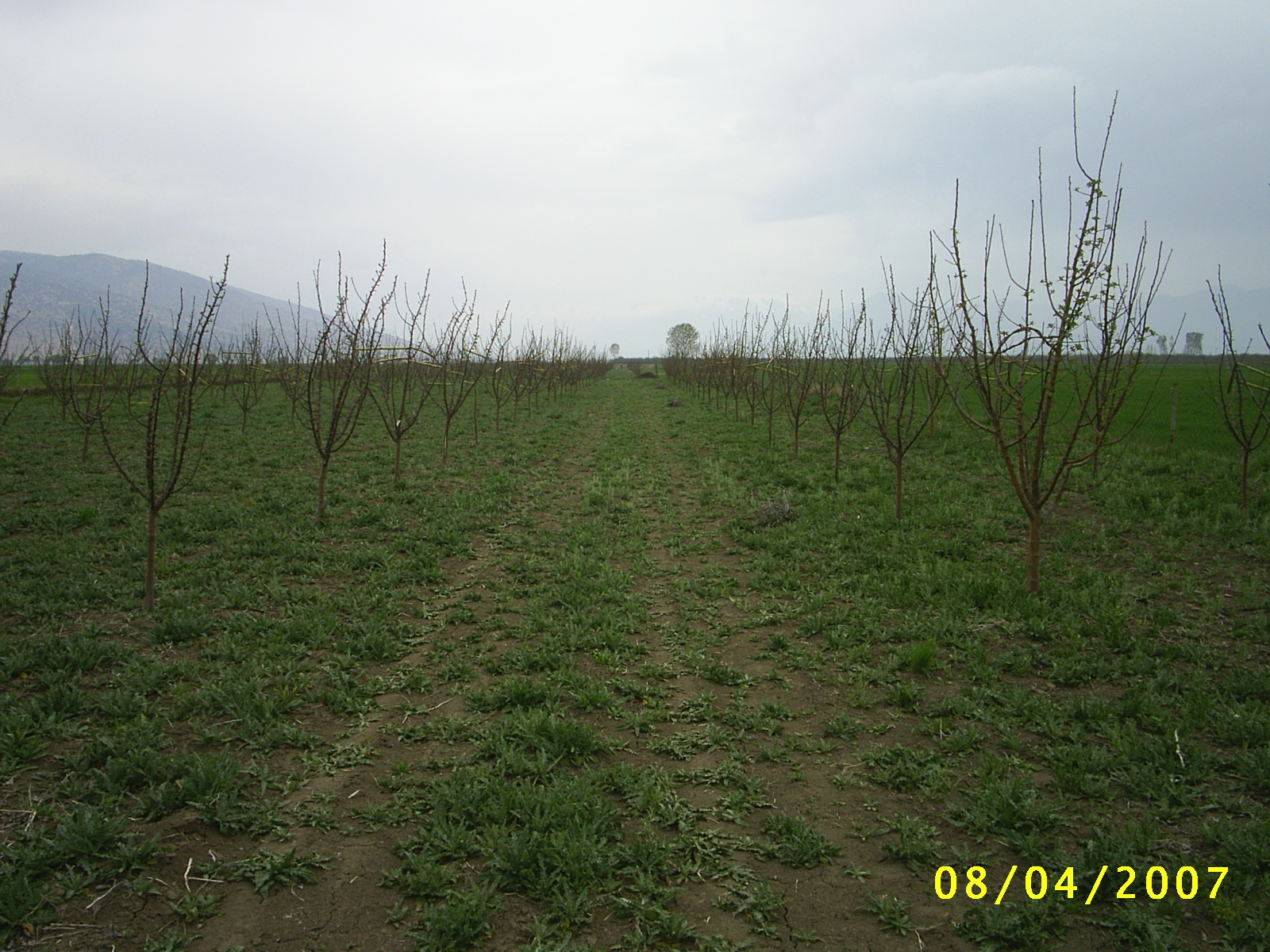
Field in Yakaçiftlikköyü

Yakaçiftlikköyü is a neighbourhood in the municipality and district of Elmalı, Antalya Province, Turkey. Its population is 439 (2022).
