= Mursal, Elmalı =

Mursal
- Neighbourhood
- Location in Turkey
- Coordinates: 36.6839°N 29.8150°E
- Country: Turkey
- Province: Antalya
- District: Elmalı
- Population (2022): 346
- Time zone: UTC+3 (TRT)

Mursal is a neighbourhood in the municipality and district of Elmalı, Antalya Province, Turkey. Its population is 346 (2022).
