= Özdemir, Elmalı =

Özdemir
- Neighbourhood
- Location in Turkey
- Coordinates: 36.8751°N 30.0581°E
- Country: Turkey
- Province: Antalya
- District: Elmalı
- Population (2022): 441
- Time zone: UTC+3 (TRT)

Özdemir is a neighbourhood in the municipality and district of Elmalı, Antalya Province, Turkey. Its population is 441 (2022).
