= Seferuşağı, Çüngüş =

Village in Turkey

Seferuşağı
- Neighbourhood
- Location in Turkey
- Coordinates: 38°14′N 39°28′E
- Country: Turkey
- Province: Diyarbakır
- District: Çüngüş
- Population (2022): 116
- Time zone: UTC+3 (TRT)

Seferuşağı is a neighbourhood in the municipality and district of Çüngüş, Diyarbakır Province in Turkey. Its population is 116 (2022).
