= Geçmen, Elmalı =

Geçmen
- Neighbourhood
- Location in Turkey
- Coordinates: 36°41′N 29°59′E
- Country: Turkey
- Province: Antalya
- District: Elmalı
- Population (2022): 296
- Time zone: UTC+3 (TRT)

Geçmen is a neighbourhood in the municipality and district of Elmalı, Antalya Province, Turkey. Its population is 296 (2022).
