= Akçaeniş, Elmalı =

Akçaeniş
- Neighbourhood
- Location in Turkey
- Coordinates: 36°37′N 29°50′E
- Country: Turkey
- Province: Antalya
- District: Elmalı
- Population (2022): 710
- Time zone: UTC+3 (TRT)

Akçaeniş is a neighbourhood in the municipality and district of Elmalı, Antalya Province, Turkey. Its population is 710 (2022). The village is inhabited by Tahtacı.
