= Macun, Elmalı =

Macun
- Neighbourhood
- Location in Turkey
- Coordinates: 36.8400°N 29.8683°E
- Country: Turkey
- Province: Antalya
- District: Elmalı
- Population (2022): 244
- Time zone: UTC+3 (TRT)

Macun is a neighbourhood in the municipality and district of Elmalı, Antalya Province, Turkey. Its population is 244 (2022).
