= Gerenkova, İncirliova =

Gerenkova
- Neighbourhood
- Location in Turkey Gerenkova (Turkey Aegean)
- Coordinates: 37°51′N 27°45′E
- Country: Turkey
- Province: Aydın
- District: İncirliova
- Population (2022): 1,980
- Time zone: UTC+3 (TRT)

Gerenkova is a neighbourhood in the municipality and district of İncirliova, Aydın Province, Turkey. Its population is 1,980 (2022).
