= Bayındır, Elmalı =

Bayındır
- Neighbourhood
- Location in Turkey
- Coordinates: 36.7835°N 29.9558°E
- Country: Turkey
- Province: Antalya
- District: Elmalı
- Population (2022): 343
- Time zone: UTC+3 (TRT)

Bayındır is a neighbourhood in the municipality and district of Elmalı, Antalya Province, Turkey. Its population is 343 (2022).
