= Atalar, Çüngüş =

Village in Turkey

Atalar
- Neighbourhood
- Location in Turkey
- Coordinates: 38.2594°N 39.3714°E
- Country: Turkey
- Province: Diyarbakır
- District: Çüngüş
- Population (2022): 870
- Time zone: UTC+3 (TRT)

Atalar is a neighbourhood in the municipality and district of Çüngüş, Diyarbakır Province in Turkey. Its population is 870 (2022).
