= Naz Albayrak =

Turkish deaf tennis player (born 2007)

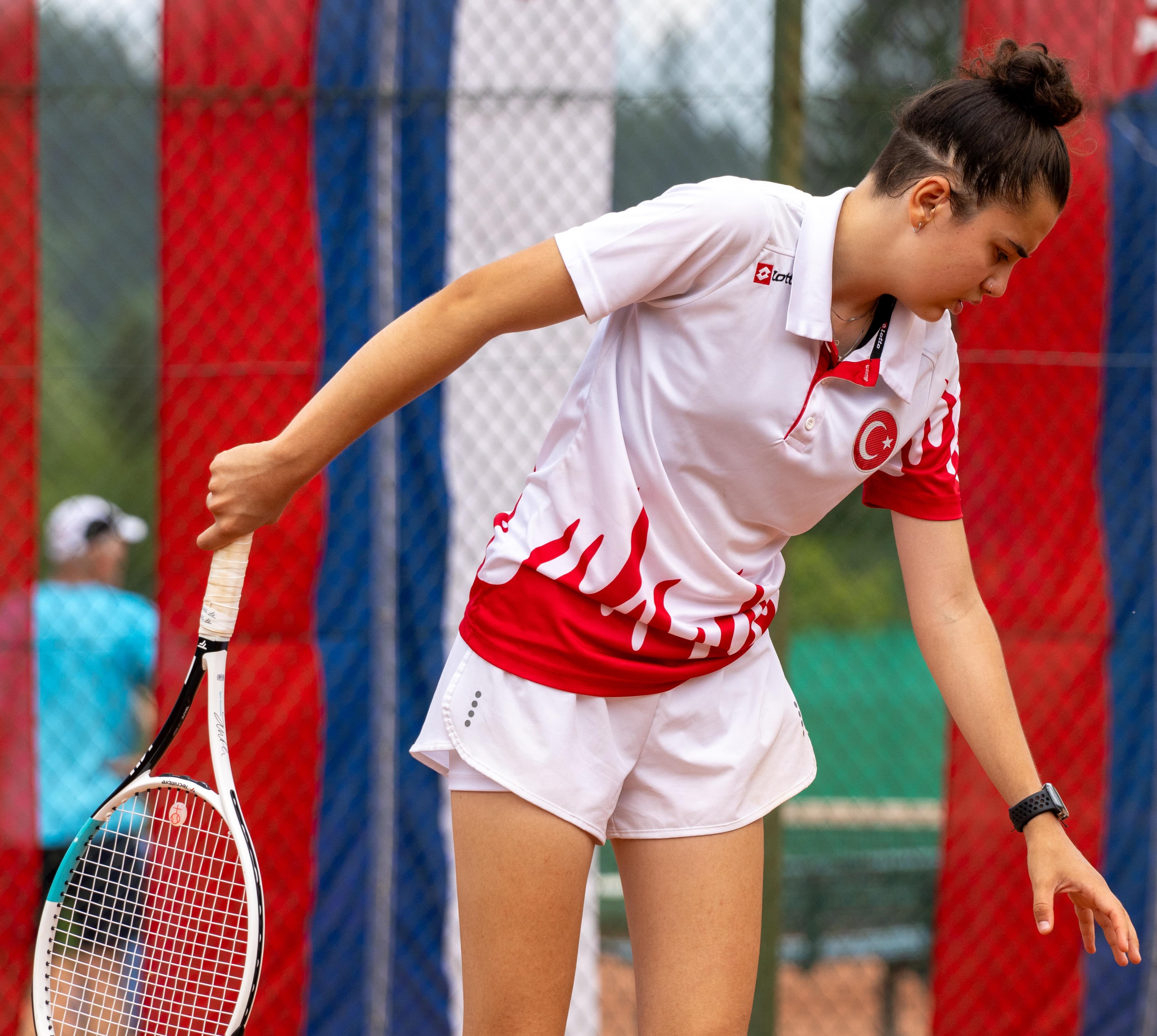
- Naz Albayrak (2024)
- Country (sports): Turkey
- Born: 2 April 2007 (age 19) Çanakkale, Turkey
Medal record
Women's tennis
Representing Turkey
European Deaf Tennis Championship
Silver medal – second place	2024 Villach	J Singles
Silver medal – second place	2024 Villach	J Doubles
Gold medal – first place	2024 Villach	J Mixed Doubles

Naz Albayrak (born 2 April 2007) is a Turkish Deaf tennis player who competes also in doubles and mixed team events.

== Sport career ==
Albayrak is a member of the Galatasaray Taç Spor Tennis Club.

Already at the age of 12, she became champion in the girls' singles and runners-up in the girls' doubles, and took the third place in the senior women's singles at the Turkish Deaf Tennis Championship in Mersin. Two years later, she became runners-up in Ankara.

At the 2024 European Deaf Tennis Championships in Villach, Austria, she won the silver medal in the girls' singles, another silver medal in the girls' doubles and the gold medal in the junior mixed doubles and she became the European Champion.

In 2025, at the Turkish Deaf Tennis Championships in Ankara, Albayrak won gold medals in all categories: singles, doubles, and mixed doubles, thus becoming the Turkish champion in all categories.

She participated in the 2025 Summer Deaflympics in Tokyo, Japan and she received the title of Olympic athlete.

== Personal life ==
Naz Albayrak was born in Çanakkale, Turkey on 2 April 2007.
