= Güneydere, Çüngüş =

Village in Turkey

Güneydere
- Neighbourhood
- Country: Turkey
- Province: Diyarbakır
- District: Çüngüş
- Population (2022): 94
- Time zone: UTC+3 (TRT)

Güneydere is a neighbourhood in the municipality and district of Çüngüş, Diyarbakır Province in Turkey. Its population is 94 (2022).
