= Taner Yıldız (footballer) =

Turkish footballer

Personal information
- Date of birth: 23 December 1992 (age 33)
- Place of birth: Ilıca, Turkey
- Height: 1.76 m (5 ft 9 in)
- Position: Midfielder

Team information
- Current team: Ağrı 1970 SK
- Number: 25

Youth career
- Kasımpaşa

Senior career*
| Years | Team | Apps | (Gls) |
| 2011–2013 | Kasımpaşa | 3 | (0) |
| 2012 | → İstanbulspor (loan) | 10 | (0) |
| 2013–2014 | Bayrampaşaspor | 31 | (1) |
| 2014–2016 | Pazarspor | 58 | (1) |
| 2016 | HEASK | 16 | (2) |
| 2017 | Fatih Karagümrük | 29 | (2) |
| 2018 | Diyarbakırspor | 18 | (0) |
| 2018–2019 | Tuzlaspor | 22 | (0) |
| 2019 | Bayrampaşaspor | 11 | (0) |
| 2020 | Somaspor | 9 | (0) |
| 2020–2021 | Sultanbeyli Belediyespor | 30 | (0) |
| 2021–2022 | Şile Yıldızspor | 33 | (0) |
| 2022– | Ağrı 1970 SK | 11 | (0) |
- * Club domestic league appearances and goals as of 22:47, 13 November 2022

Taner Yıldız (born 23 December 1992) is a Turkish footballer who plays as a midfielder for Ağrı 1970 SK. He made his Süper Lig debut against Galatasaray on 9 May 2011.
