= Eskihisar, Elmalı =

Eskihisar
- Neighbourhood
- Location in Turkey
- Coordinates: 36.7900°N 29.8080°E
- Country: Turkey
- Province: Antalya
- District: Elmalı
- Population (2022): 875
- Time zone: UTC+3 (TRT)

Eskihisar is a neighbourhood in the municipality and district of Elmalı, Antalya Province, Turkey. Its population is 875 (2022).
