= Geçitköy, Elmalı =

Geçitköy
- Neighbourhood
- Location in Turkey
- Coordinates: 36.7327°N 29.8010°E
- Country: Turkey
- Province: Antalya
- District: Elmalı
- Population (2022): 190
- Time zone: UTC+3 (TRT)

Geçitköy (also: Geçit) is a neighbourhood in the municipality and district of Elmalı, Antalya Province, Turkey. Its population is 190 (2022).
