= Death of Tuğçe Albayrak =

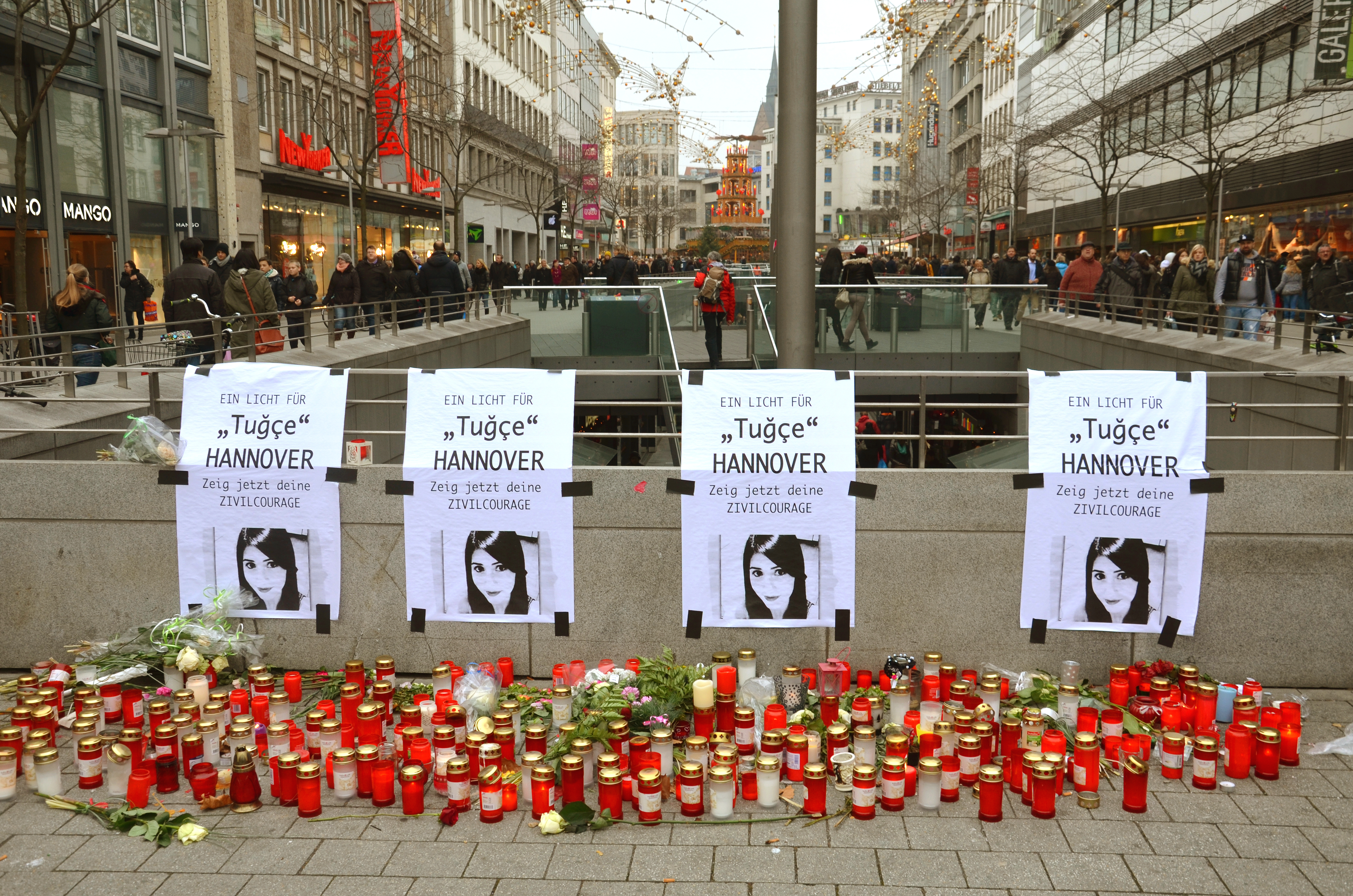
Posters, candles and flowers in memory of Tuğçe Albayrak on December 6, 2014, Hanover

In the early hours of 15 November 2014, a German student by the name of Tuğçe Albayrak (born November 28, 1991) was struck and fatally injured outside a McDonald's restaurant in Offenbach am Main after intervening on behalf of two young women who were being harassed by a man. They reportedly got into a verbal fight and she is said to have insulted him before the fatal blow got thrown, which a witness later testified in court. The video footage lacks sound so the details could never get solved. Albayrak was born to Turkish-German parents; she lived in Gelnhausen and was studying to become a German and ethics teacher at the University of Giessen.

The incident was widely reported in German and Turkish media and engendered a national debate in Germany about youth crime and civil courage.

== Incident ==
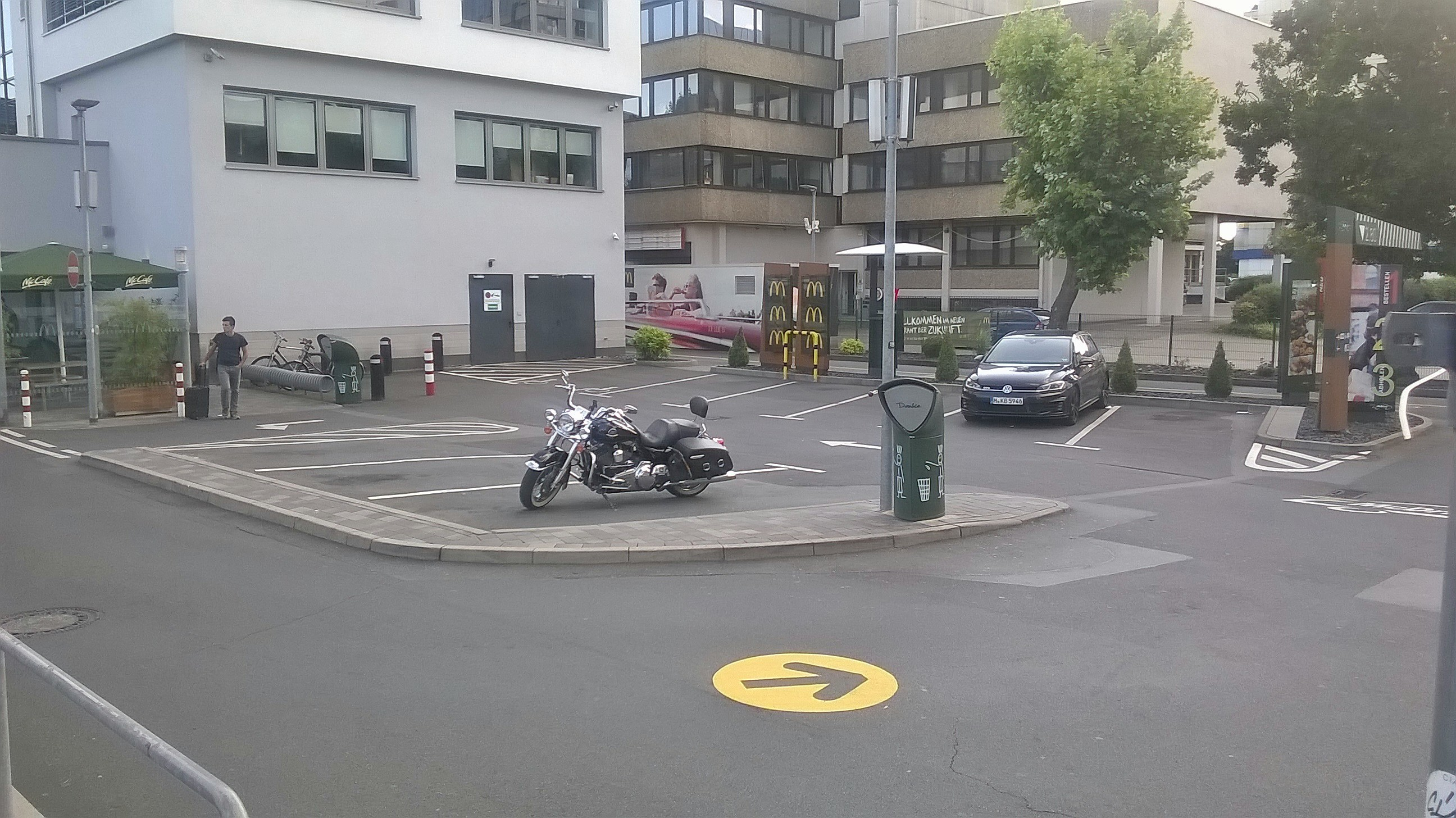
Place of incident

According to witnesses, the attack took place after Albayrak had attempted to intervene in a situation between three men who were harassing two teenage girls in the toilets of the McDonald's restaurant. One of the men later attacked her outside, in the restaurant's parking lot.

A surveillance video showing the attack was published online by the Bild newspaper on 1 December. Police say the video had not been cleared for publication and they are investigating how it came to be released. The video shows Albayrak standing among a group of people in the parking lot. After a few minutes, the attacker enters the image. He is visibly agitated, gesticulating towards the group while being held back on one arm by a friend. The attacker leaves the field of view, and re-appears shortly, now about 20–m from the group. Albayrak is seen leaving the group to confront the attacker. The attacker's friend is now standing immediately between attacker and victim. The attacker suddenly strikes past his friend, hitting the victim, who falls to the ground immediately.

Albayrak sustained severe brain damage and fell into a coma. Doctors pronounced her brain dead on 26 November. Her parents decided to remove her life support on 28 November, her 23rd birthday.

The attacker was identified as Sanel Mašović, a citizen of Serbia, whose place of birth was variously reported as the Sandžak region of southwestern Serbia and Offenbach, Germany. Mašović was reported as having a previous record of violence in Germany, including a conviction for battery, besides counts of burglary and theft. He was taken into custody and was said to have admitted to attacking Albayrak. In June 2015, he was sentenced to three years imprisonment for manslaughter. In April 2017 he was deported to Serbia and barred from Germany for eight years.

== Reactions ==
The attack and its aftermath were intensely covered by both Turkish and German newspapers. The Turkish-language German paper Sabah Avrupa in its 16 November edition cited one of the victim's friends, who described the incidents in terms of "the Serbs waited for us and insulted us again. But we defended ourselves, and one of them slapped me, then he ran over to Tuğçe and punched her". Other Turkish newspapers picked up on the attackers being a "Serb" and several newspapers published a photograph showing the attacker grinning. Takvim labelled the photograph "the Serbian butcher". Frankfurter Rundschau criticized the ethnic connotation in Turkish media, pointing out that the attacker is a native of Sandžak, a region predominantly inhabited by Bosniaks, and Offenbach police issued a statement saying they have no indication that the attack had any "ethnic background".

On 27 November, hundreds of people held a vigil outside the restaurant, followed by a number of vigils across Germany on 29 November, with a total number of attendees in the thousands. Bosniak-Swiss footballer Haris Seferovic offered a tribute to the victim by means of a message on his T-shirt following his goal in Eintracht Frankfurt's 2–0 Bundesliga win over Borussia Dortmund on 30 November. After her death, more than 200,000 people signed an online petition calling for the German president to posthumously award her the Federal Order of Merit. German President Joachim Gauck wrote to Albayrak's family to give his condolences, calling her a role model—"where other people looked the other way, Tuğçe showed exemplary courage and moral fortitude."
