= İkizdere, İncirliova =

İkizdere
- Neighbourhood
- Location in Turkey İkizdere (Turkey Aegean)
- Coordinates: 37°52′34″N 27°42′36″E
- Country: Turkey
- Province: Aydın
- District: İncirliova
- Population (2022): 315
- Time zone: UTC+3 (TRT)

İkizdere is a neighbourhood in the municipality and district of İncirliova, Aydın Province, Turkey. Its population is 315 (2022).
