= Hacımusalar, Elmalı =

Hacımusalar
- Neighbourhood
- Location in Turkey
- Coordinates: 36.6458°N 29.8270°E
- Country: Turkey
- Province: Antalya
- District: Elmalı
- Population (2022): 163
- Time zone: UTC+3 (TRT)

Hacımusalar is a neighbourhood in the municipality and district of Elmalı, Antalya Province, Turkey. Its population is 163 (2022).
