= Göltarla, Elmalı =

Göltarla
- Neighbourhood
- Location in Turkey
- Coordinates: 36.5627°N 29.9571°E
- Country: Turkey
- Province: Antalya
- District: Elmalı
- Population (2022): 153
- Time zone: UTC+3 (TRT)

Göltarla is a neighbourhood in the municipality and district of Elmalı, Antalya Province, Turkey. Its population is 153 (2022).
