= Hoya, Çüngüş =

Village in Turkey

Hoya
- Neighbourhood
- Location in Turkey
- Coordinates: 38°11′17″N 39°15′54″E
- Country: Turkey
- Province: Diyarbakır
- District: Çüngüş
- Population (2022): 360
- Time zone: UTC+3 (TRT)

Hoya (formerly Geçitköy) is a neighbourhood in the municipality and district of Çüngüş, Diyarbakır Province in Turkey. Its population is 360 (2022).
