= Koçören, Çüngüş =

Village in Turkey

Koçören
- Neighbourhood
- Country: Turkey
- Province: Diyarbakır
- District: Çüngüş
- Population (2022): 155
- Time zone: UTC+3 (TRT)

Koçören is a neighbourhood in the municipality and district of Çüngüş, Diyarbakır Province in Turkey. Its population is 155 (2022).
