= Arpadere, İncirliova =

Arpadere
- Neighbourhood
- Location in Turkey Arpadere (Turkey Aegean)
- Coordinates: 37.9688°N 27.7293°E
- Country: Turkey
- Province: Aydın
- District: İncirliova
- Population (2022): 340
- Time zone: UTC+3 (TRT)

Arpadere is a neighbourhood in the municipality and district of İncirliova, Aydın Province, Turkey. Its population is 340 (2022).
