= Yapraklı, Elmalı =

Yapraklı
- Neighbourhood
- Location in Turkey
- Coordinates: 36.8292°N 29.7956°E
- Country: Turkey
- Province: Antalya
- District: Elmalı
- Population (2022): 225
- Time zone: UTC+3 (TRT)

Yapraklı is a neighbourhood in the municipality and district of Elmalı, Antalya Province, Turkey. Its population is 225 (2022).

== History ==
The village was originally named after an Armenian priest named 'Gügü', who once lived there. The name of the neighborhood was later changed to "Yapraklı"

== Geography ==
The city centre of Antalya is 132 km away, and the town centre of Elmalı is 22 km away.
