= Albayrak, Çüngüş =

Village in Turkey

Albayrak
- Neighbourhood
- Location in Turkey
- Coordinates: 38.3381°N 39.3185°E
- Country: Turkey
- Province: Diyarbakır
- District: Çüngüş
- Population (2022): 64
- Time zone: UTC+3 (TRT)

Albayrak is a neighbourhood in the municipality and district of Çüngüş, Diyarbakır Province in Turkey. Its population is 64 (2022).
