= Düdenköy, Elmalı =

Düdenköy
- Neighbourhood
- Location in Turkey
- Coordinates: 36.6777°N 29.9119°E
- Country: Turkey
- Province: Antalya
- District: Elmalı
- Population (2022): 553
- Time zone: UTC+3 (TRT)

Düdenköy (also: Düden) is a neighbourhood in the municipality and district of Elmalı, Antalya Province, Turkey. Its population is 553 (2022).
