= Arpadere, Çüngüş =

Village in Turkey

Arpadere
- Neighbourhood
- Location in Turkey
- Coordinates: 38.2157°N 39.4009°E
- Country: Turkey
- Province: Diyarbakır
- District: Çüngüş
- Population (2022): 86
- Time zone: UTC+3 (TRT)

Arpadere is a neighbourhood in the municipality and district of Çüngüş, Diyarbakır Province in Turkey. Its population is 86 (2022).
