= Akçeşme, İncirliova =

Akçeşme
- Neighbourhood
- Location in Turkey Akçeşme (Turkey Aegean)
- Coordinates: 37°52′52″N 27°40′41″E
- Country: Turkey
- Province: Aydın
- District: İncirliova
- Population (2022): 290
- Time zone: UTC+3 (TRT)

Akçeşme is a neighbourhood in the municipality and district of İncirliova, Aydın Province, Turkey. Its population is 290 (2022). The village is inhabited by Tahtacı.
