= Tayfun Rıdvan Albayrak =

Turkish footballer and manager

Personal information
- Date of birth: 4 July 1980 (age 46)
- Place of birth: Borçka, Turkey
- Position: Midfielder

Senior career*
Years	Team	Apps	(Gls)
1998	Kepezspor		
1998–2000	Ç. Dardanelspor		
1998–1999	→ Simav Eynalspor (loan)		
1999–2000	→ İzmitspor (loan)		
2000–2002	İzmitspor		
2002–2003	Eskişehirspor		
2003–2004	İstanbul B.B.		
2004–2005	Kasımpaşa		
2005	Eskişehirspor		
2005–2006	Kasımpaşa		
2006–2007	Kartalspor		
2007	Y. Yozgatspor		
2007–2008	Giresunspor		
2008	Bucaspor		
2008–2009	Konya Şekerspor		
2009–2010	Göztepe		
2010	Sarıyer		
2011–2012	İstanbulspor		

Managerial career
- 2016–2017: İstanbulspor
- 2019–2020: Şile Yıldızspor
- 2025–2026: Ümraniyespor
- * Club domestic league appearances and goals

Tayfun Rıdvan Albayrak (born 4 July 1980) is a Turkish professional football coach and a former player who played as a midfielder.

He formerly played for Kepezspor, Simav Eynalspor, İzmitspor, Eskişehirspor, İstanbul B.B., Kasımpaşa, Kartalspor, Yimpaş Yozgatspor, Giresunspor, Bucaspor and Konya Şekerspor. He appeared in 29 TFF First League matches for İstanbul B.B. and Giresunspor.
