= Erbeyli, İncirliova =

Erbeyli
- Neighbourhood
- Location in Turkey Erbeyli (Turkey Aegean)
- Coordinates: 37°52′1″N 27°40′48″E
- Country: Turkey
- Province: Aydın
- District: İncirliova
- Population (2022): 1,088
- Time zone: UTC+3 (TRT)

Erbeyli is a neighbourhood in the municipality and district of İncirliova, Aydın Province, Turkey. Its population is 1,088 (2022).
