= İncirliova =

- District and municipality
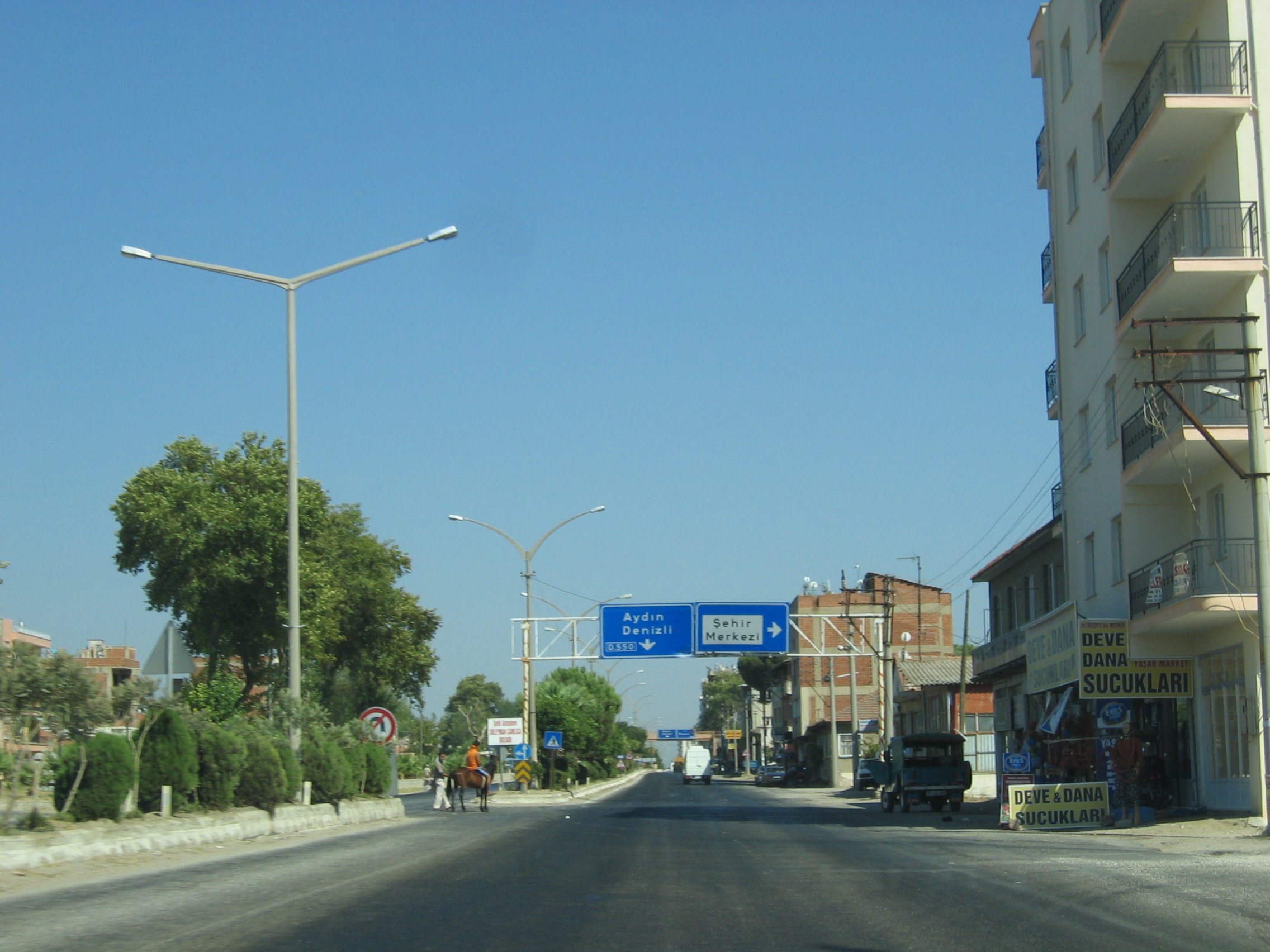

- Map showing İncirliova District in Aydın Province

- Location within Turkey Location within Turkey Aegean
- Coordinates: 37°51′17″N 27°43′25″E
- Country: Turkey
- Province: Aydın

Government
  - Mayor: Aytekin Kaya (AKP)
- Area: 188 km^{2} (73 sq mi)
- Elevation: 60 m (200 ft)
- Population (2022): 55,848
  - Density: 297/km^{2} (769/sq mi)
- Time zone: UTC+3 (TRT)
- Postal code: 09600
- Area code: 0256
- Website: www.incirliova.bel.tr

İncirliova is a municipality and district of Aydın Province, Turkey. Its area is 188 km^{2}, and its population is 55,848 (2022). It is 10 km (6 mi) west of the city of Aydın.

== Etymology ==
Formerly known as "Karapınar" the name was changed in 1937 to İncirliova meaning, literally, "the valley of figs", in reference to the fruit (ficus carica, formerly called Smyrna figs) in whose production the province of Aydın excels.

== History ==
See Aydın for the rich history of this area, which has so much remaining from antiquity that it feels like an open museum.

The area has changed hands many times throughout history, from the Hittites in the 13th century BC through the Phrygians, Lydians, Ionians, Persians, Alexander the Great, Ancient Rome and Byzantium. The Turkish settlement here was founded in the 15th century by the Madanoğlu family and as it was well watered was called "Karapınar" (dark spring).

The Karapınar area really developed with the building of the İzmir-Aydın railway, founded by a British company to ensure a new source of cotton during the world shortage caused by the American Civil War. Following the railway came other industries including the spinning of cotton and the extraction of olive oil and the surrounding wetlands were drained to create more land for planting. At the same time water was channeled to bathhouses and mills in the ever-growing town.

Following the Treaty of Sèvres, after the defeat of the Ottoman Empire in the First World War Karapınar was occupied by Greek forces from May 26, 1919. The Turkish resistance began at nearby Erbeyli in June 1919 and continued in the area throughout the Turkish War of Independence, while the Turkish people of the town retreated into the surrounding hills for safety to gather forces for further resistance. Following the defeat of the Greek army at İnönü and their retreat to the Aegean coast, Karapınar was liberated on September 7, 1922.

During the 1920s Karapınar was rebuilt with the founding of sports clubs, a fig-growers union, and a fruit market. The town's first bank, İtibar Bankası was founded in 1927 and electricity came to Karapınar in 1930. The town was renamed İncirliova in the 1930s following an observation by Atatürk of how many fig trees there were in the area.

== Geography ==
İncirliova itself is today a small town of 18,000 people, on the İzmir–Aydın highway and a station on the İzmir-Aydın railway. This area of the Büyük Menderes valley is very fertile and İncirliova is an agricultural district.

== Composition ==
There are 28 neighbourhoods in İncirliova District:

- Acarlar
- Akçeşme
- Arpadere
- Arzular
- Atatürk
- Beyköy
- Cumhuriyet
- Dereağzı
- Eğrek
- Erbeyli
- Gerenkova
- Hacıaliobası
- Hamitler
- Hürriyet
- İkizdere
- İsafakılar
- İstiklal
- Karabağ
- Karagözler
- Köprüova
- Kurtuluş
- Osmanbükü
- Palamut
- Sandıklı
- Sınırteke
- Şirindere
- Yazıdere
- Zafer

== Places of interest ==
- The Atatürk memorial to the memory of the Turkish War of Independence in the town was built in 1985 by Professor Tankut Öktem of Marmara University, it was the first sizeable monument to be designed solely by a Turkish architect.
